= Tuteamutu =

Tuteamutu was a Māori rangatira (chief) of the Tūhourangi iwi (tribe) in the Te Arawa confederation.

== Life ==
Tuteamutu was the son of Taketakehikuroa and grandson of Tūhourangi, ancestor of the Tūhourangi iwi, through whom he was descended from Tama-te-kapua, the captain of the Arawa by multiple lines. He had one full brother, Te Wiwiniorongo.

=== Attack of Kuramaiterangi ===
Tuteamutu settled at Pakotore on the Kaituna River, southwest of modern Paengaroa, with his son Kaorewhare. Kuramaiterangi of Ngāi Te Rangi came to Pakotore with a war party, blowing a trumpet and demanding that Tuteamutu and his people hand over food to him. The people of Pakotore were eating aruhe (bracken fernroot) outside the settlement when he arrived and one of them, an old woman, called on the people to resist Kuramaiterangi, but they were afraid and withdrew into the fortress. Kuramaiterangi cursed the people of Pakotore, so the old lady told him off, and he cursed the people again in response. She sang a karakia, which caused him to fall down as he went to attack her. Then she smashed in his head using a fernroot pounder.

Fearing requital, Tuteamutu moved inland to Pukemotiti and Tauparahokio. Meanwhile, Ngāi Te Rangi sacked Pakotore and killed two Tūhourangi leaders, Puraho and Te Mahanga. After the war party departed, Kaorewhare resettled Pakotore.

== Family ==
Tuteamutu married his cousin Te Aorauru, daughter of Uenukukōpako

- Umukaria, who married Hinemoru, with whom he had children three children, and Hinerake, with whom he had one:

- Hinemoa, who married Tutanekai
- Te Koropunia
- Wāhiao:

- Anumātao:

- Ngāpuia, wife of Pūkaki.

- Parapara:

- Parewainga

- Wharerauhe

- Te Tuki

- Umupapa

- Miriama

- Peata Matariki who married Mokopapaki

- Kaorewhare:

- Ruamaiwaho

- Tahamahake

- Taniwha

- Utaora

- Te Mata

- Te Kawe who married Rarunga

- Topea

- Piripi

- Ngaruri

- Te Amo

- Keepa

- Te Koata

- Iripa

- Te Aruhe, who married Kerei

- Wihapi

- Moho

- Patana

- Hinera

- Ruamarama

- Te Wawana

- Hikawerewere

- Whariua

- Mutu

- Te Kauiti who married Hapoko

- Kerei, who married the aforementioned distant cousin Te Aruhe

- Te Aongahoro, who married her cousin Tawakeheimoa
- Paraoa:

- Rora

- Hineteaorangi

- Ngakorehu

- Ngauinga who married Te Wehi

- Pepeketuri:

- Rahui

- Taketakekoro

- Te Arimawhai

- Ngawhenga, who married Rerewa of Apumoana and had one child:

- Ngawhakawairangi, who married Ruruhia and had one child:

- Hinehaka, who married Whatarangi and had one child:

- Hinemarama,

- Te Pora, who married Putoko

== Bibliography ==
- Stafford, D.M. (1967). Te Arawa: A History of the Arawa People. Rotorua, New Zealand: A.H. & A.W. Reed.
- Steedman, J.A.W. (1984). Ngā Ohaaki o ngā Whānau o Tauranga Moana: Māori History and Genealogy of the Bay of Plenty.
