= Mita Taupopoki =

Tūhourangi and Ngāti Wāhiao Māori leader

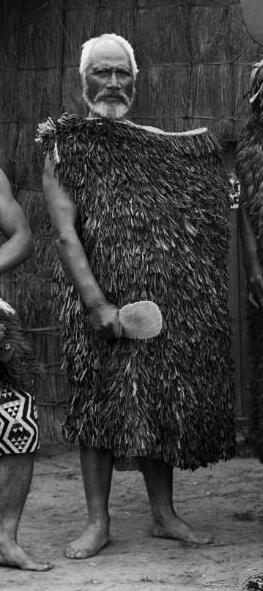
Mita Taupopoki at the model pā at the 1906 International Exhibition

Mita Taupopoki (c. 1845 – 14 January 1935) was a notable Māori tribal leader of New Zealand. He identified with Ngāti Wāhiao, a hapū (subtribe) of the Tūhourangi iwi of Te Arawa.

He was born near Lake Rotorua, New Zealand, probably in 1845 or 1846. His father, Hēmana Te Whareiro of Ngāti Wāhiao, lived mostly at Whakarewarewa. His mother, Kanea II, was of Tūhourangi, and the Ngāti Tūnohopū hapū of Ngāti Whakaue. In 1864 Mita joined other Te Arawa who fought for the government in the wars of the 1860s. He returned to Whakarewarewa in 1874. In 1883 he represented several hapū of Ngāti Wāhiao in the Native Land Court in a case relating to land claimed by Ngāti Whakaue, including Whakarewarewa, and succeeded in claims to the land on the east side of the Puarenga Stream at Whakarewarewa, although other land was won by Ngāti Whakaue. His success in the land court contributed to a recognition of his leadership among the wider Tūhourangi, in addition to within Ngāti Wāhiao. The 1886 eruption of Mount Tarawera killed many Tūhourangi, and survivors took refuge with Mita and his people at Whakarewarewa and Ōhinemutu. Mita continued to act in the Native Land Court, representing Tūhourangi, and in 1887 won recognition of their claims of the 211,000-acre Rotomahana–Parekārangi block. In 1910 he toured Australia, England and the United States with Maggie Papakura's cultural group. He died in hospital in Rotorua on 14 January 1935.
