= Te Aotepairu =

Places in the life of Te Aotepairu.
1 Pukurahi pā, Lake Rotoiti
2 Whangaruru
3 Maketū

Te Aotepairu was a woman of the Te Arawa tribal confederation in the Bay of Plenty region of New Zealand. She was initially married to Te Wiwinorongo at Lake Rotoiti, but after he publicly humiliated her, she fled to Whangaruru in Northland on the back of a taniwha and remarried to Te Aruhetara. Later, Te Rongorere, her son from her first marriage, came north and took her back to the Bay of Plenty, where she settled at Maketū.

== Life ==
Te Aotepairu was the daughter of Haururu, through whom she was a descendant of Waitaha and his father Hei, who came to New Zealand on the Arawa. Her mother was Mairekaitoke, a descendant of Toi. She was an urukehu, which is to say that she had unusually light, reddish hair.

=== Quarrel with Te Aorauru ===
Te Aotepairu married Te Wiwinorongo, a son of Taketakehikuroa of Tūhourangi. Initially, they settled at Pakotore, along with Wiwiniorongo's brother Tuteamutu, but Te Aotepairu quarrelled with her sister-in-law Te Aorauru. Taketakehikuroa had established an eel trap on the Kaituna River, just after the Hururu stream flows into it, which was called Te Moanaporohe-a-Taketakehikuroa or Te Rotoporohe-a-Taketakehikuroa ("Taketakehikuroa's sea or lake of spawn"). After one trip to this eel trap, Te Aorauru accused Te Aotepairu of shirking the work. She and Te Wiwiniorongo were so offended that they left Pakotore and went to Taketakehikuroa at Ohoukaka. He decided to split his lands between the two sons to avoid further conflict, giving Paengaroa to Tuteamutu and Ohoukaka to Te Wiwiniorongo. After this, Te Aotepairu and Te Wiwinorongo resettled at Pukurahi pā on Te Weta Bay at Lake Rotoiti.

=== Journey to Whangaruru ===
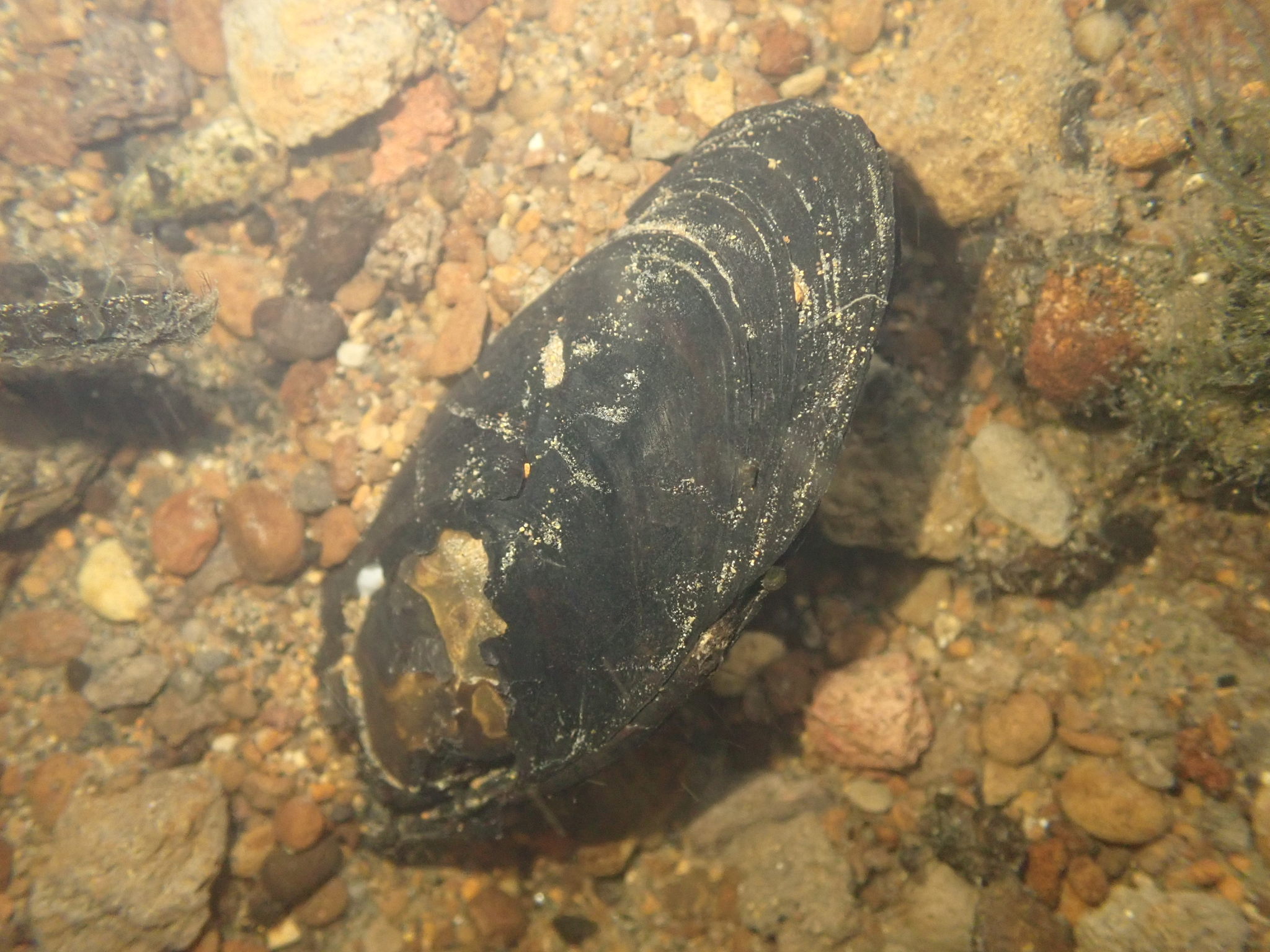
kākahi (freshwater mussel).

A chief came from Taupō to Pukurahi and Te Aotepairu was sent out diving for kākahi (freshwater mussels) to feed the guests. Meanwhile, Te Wiwinorongo sent a servant to collect kumara from their storage place, Parangiakaikore cave, but the cave turned out to be empty, which was deeply embarrassing. Te Wiwinorongo blamed his wife for the faux pas, dubbing her Nihowera ("unthrifty") and he cut holes in her mat, so that when she returned from collecting the kākahi and wrapped it around herself to dry off, her private parts were exposed to the guests. She fled Pukurahi in embarrassment.

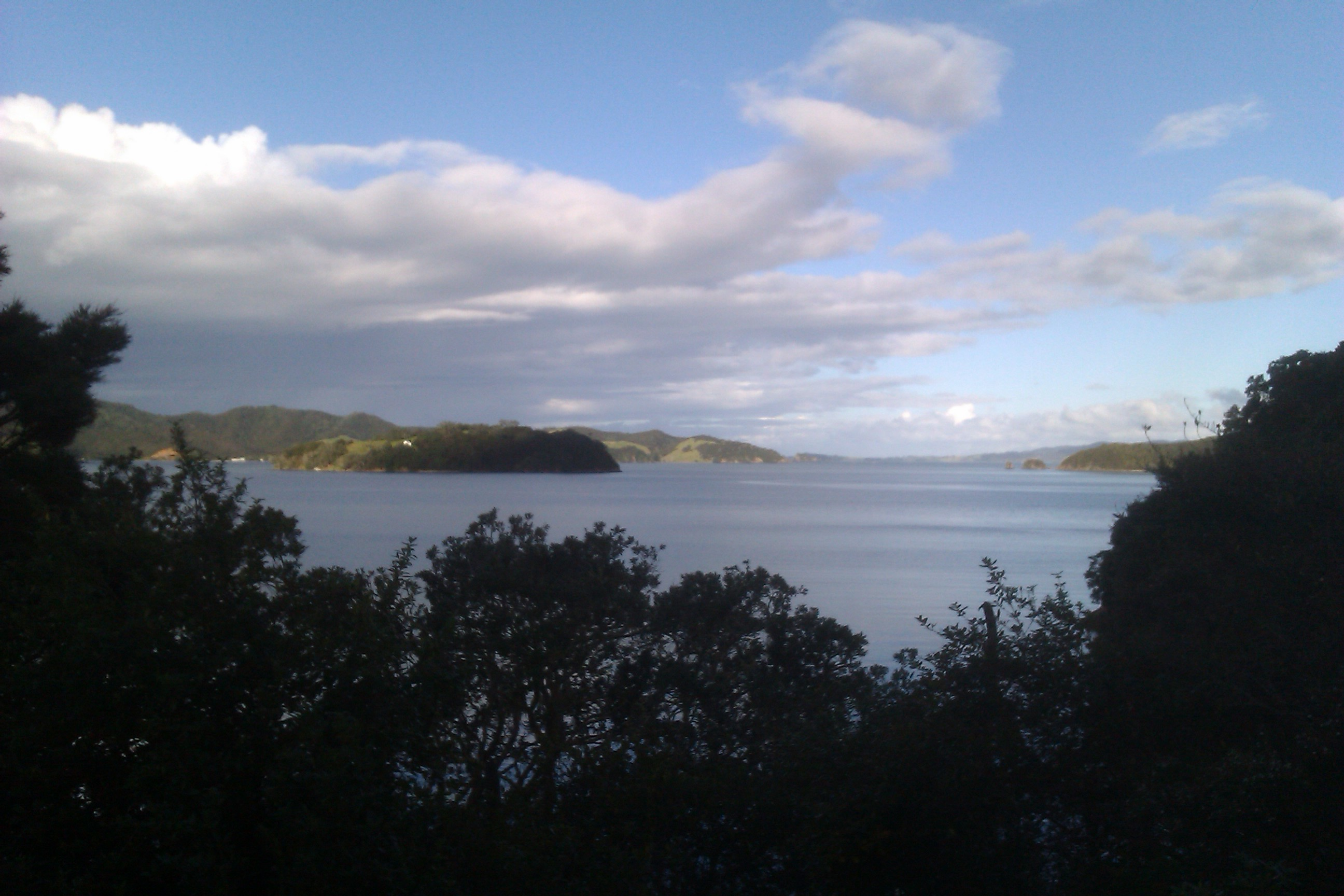
Whangaruru Harbour, looking south.

As she fled north, Te Aotepairu came to the Parawhenuamea Stream and the spring Te Ahikoauau, where she met a giant taniwha, which talked to her sympathetically and then let her climb on its back. The taniwha took ger down the stream to the Kaituna River, thence to Maketū and the Pacific Ocean. After four days of travel, the taniwha delivered her to Whangaruru in Northland, where she settled down and married Te Aruhetara.

=== Return to the Bay of Plenty ===
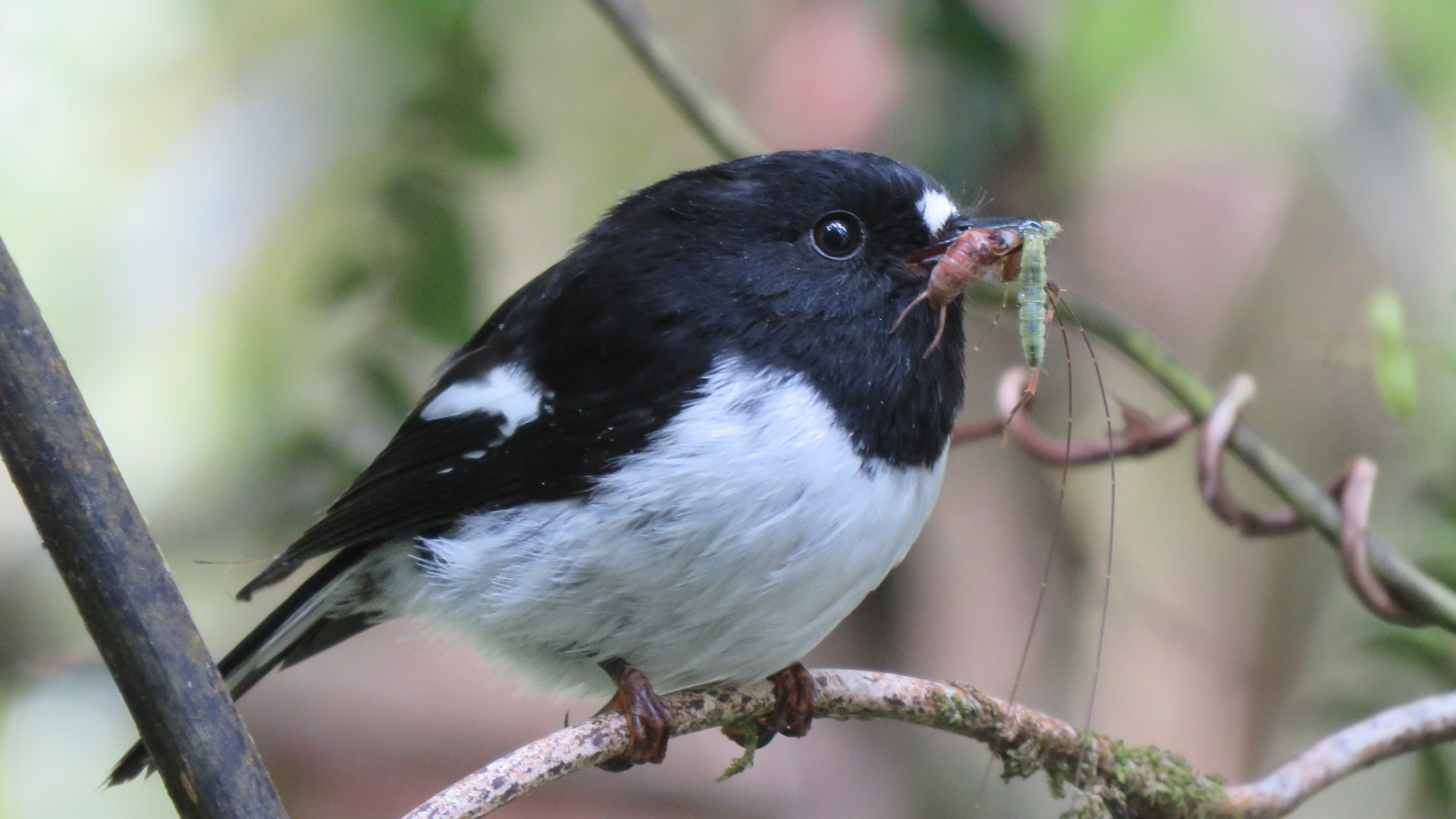
A male miromiro on a branch.

When Te Wiwinorongo's children grew up, they decided to search for their mother and set out under the leadership of Te Rongorere. He took a pet miromiro with him, which he used as a scout. As they took their canoe north along the coast, he would put it on his hand, whisper to it, and then throw it into the air, sending it out in search of Te Aotepairu. He did this in Hauraki Gulf, at Waitemata Harbour, Whangarei Heads, and at Mount Manaia, without success. Finally, they came to Whangaruru and Te Rongorere once more sent the miromiro out scouting. The bird found Te Aotepairu, landed on her head and plucked out a lock of her hair, which it carried back to Te Rongorere.

Te Rongorere came ashore in the night and snuck into the village, where he met Te Aotepairu and convinced her to return home with him. Taking her youngest child, Matairangi, she snuck out of the village and boarded the canoe. In the morning, Te Aruhetara discovered what had happened and ran down to the shore to give chase, but Te Rongorere had cut all of the ropes that secured the tops of his canoes, meaning that he could not take them to sea.

Te Aotepairu accompanied Te Rongorere as far as Maketū, where she settled and married Whitingamoko, who was descended from Pikiahu (Te Aotepairu's grandfather).

== Family ==
Te Aotepairu first married Te Wiwinorongo, with whom she had children:

- Te Rongorere

- Paekitawhiti, who married Tūwharetoa i te Aupōuri, as his senior wife.

- Hineteao

Te Aotepairu second married Te Aruhetara, with whom she had three children.

- Two older children, who remained at Whangaruru.
- Matairangi, who was taken back to the Bay of Plenty and settled at Paengaroa by the Kaikokopu Stream.

== Bibliography ==
- Grace, John Te Herekiekie (1959). Tuwharetoa: The history of the Maori people of the Taupo District. Auckland: A.H. & A.W. Reed.
- Stafford, D.M. (1967). Te Arawa: A History of the Arawa People. Rotorua, New Zealand: A.H. & A.W. Reed.
- Steedman, John Aramete Wairehu (1977). Ngā Tūpuna o Rāhera Te Kahu Hiapo: The Ancestors of Rāhera Te Kahu Hiapo. Tauranga: Bay print.
