= Mākereti Papakura =

New Zealand guide, entertainer and ethnographer

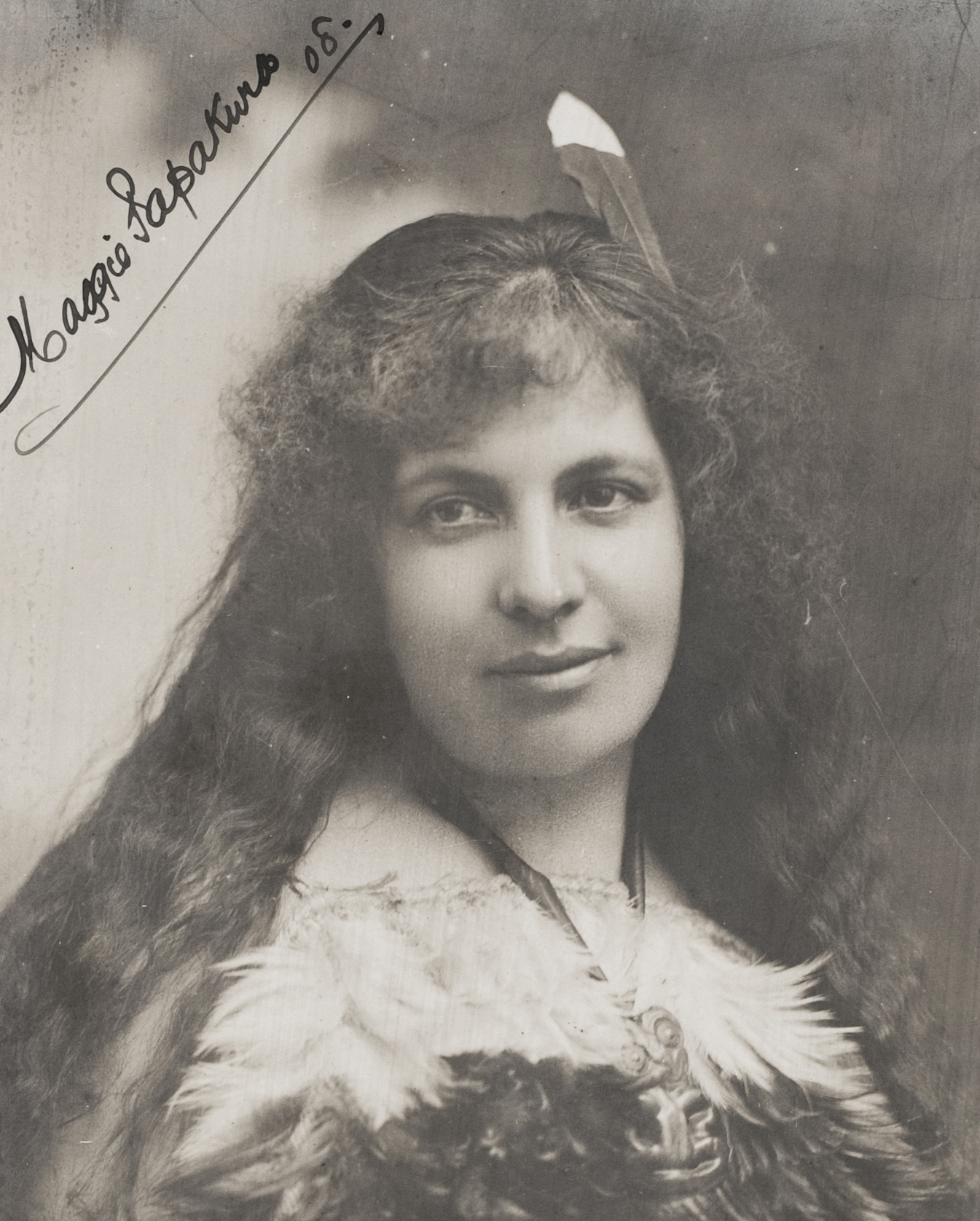
- Papakura in 1908
- Born: Margaret Pattison Thom; 20 October 1873; Matatā, New Zealand
- Died: 16 April 1930 (aged 56); Oddington, Oxfordshire, England
- Other name: Maggie Papakura
- Known for: Tourism, anthropology, Māori culture
- Spouse: Richard Staples-Browne

Margaret Pattison Staples-Browne (née Thom, 20 October 1873 – 16 April 1930), more commonly known as Mākereti or Maggie Papakura, was a New Zealand guide, entertainer and ethnographer. Of Pākehā and Māori descent, she was of Te Arawa and Tūhourangi iwi.

== Early life ==
Papakura was born in Matatā, Bay of Plenty, New Zealand, in 1873. Her parents were Englishman William Arthur Thom, a storekeeper, and Pia Ngarotū Te Rihi, a high-born Te Arawa woman of Ngāti Wāhiao hapu of Tūhourangi, descended from Te Arawa chiefs Tama-te-kapua, Ngātoroirangi, Hei and Ika.

Papakura was raised until the age of 10 by her mother's aunt and uncle, Mārara Marotaua and Maihi Te Kakau Parāoa, at the small rural village of Parekārangi, where she spoke Māori and learnt her maternal family's history, culture and traditions. When she was 10, her father took over her education and she attended schools in Rotorua and Tauranga, then Hukarere Native School for Girls in Napier.

In 1891, aged 18, she married Francis (Frank) Dennan, a surveyor, and had a son, William Francis (Te Aonui) Dennan, later that year. The family lived briefly in the Wairarapa, but Dennan left to work in Taupō and Papakura returned to Whakarewarewa. They divorced in 1900.

== Adult life ==
After secondary school, Papakura moved to live in the thermal springs area of Whakarewarewa in Rotorua and began to learn to be a guide under Guide Sophia Hinerangi. With her wages she was able to support her infant son, William. She was once asked by an overseas visitor if she had a Māori surname, and, glancing around for inspiration, she saw the geyser Papakura nearby and told the visitor her name was Maggie Papakura. From then on, she worked under the name and members of her family also adopted the new surname.

In 1901, Papakura was the guide for the Duke and Duchess of Cornwall and York (later King George V and Queen Mary) on their visit to Whakarewarewa. She was noticed by the press, and as a result was featured in magazines, calendars, brochures, books, postcards and newspaper society columns. Two years later she published her own guide book, Maggie's Guide to the Hot Lakes, which was a great success.

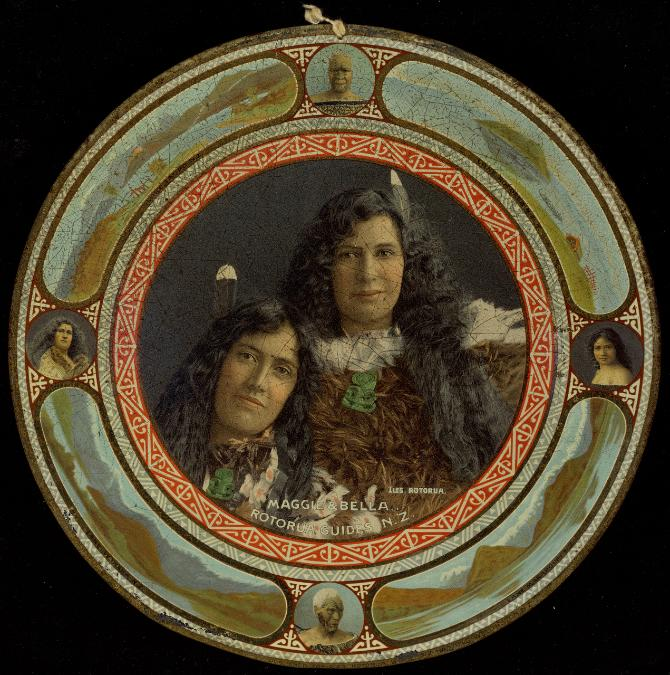
Tin plate depicting Mākereti and Bella Papakura

Papakura was also a skilled entertainer and in the early 1900s established the Rotorua Maori Choir, which she took to Sydney on tour in 1910. The tour was so successful that a group of Sydney businesspeople asked her to organise a concert party to go to London for the Festival of Empire celebrations, and in April 1911 Papakura's group left for England. The group consisted of around 40 members of Papakura's family, including her sister Bella, brother Dick and Tūhourangi leader Mita Taupopoki.

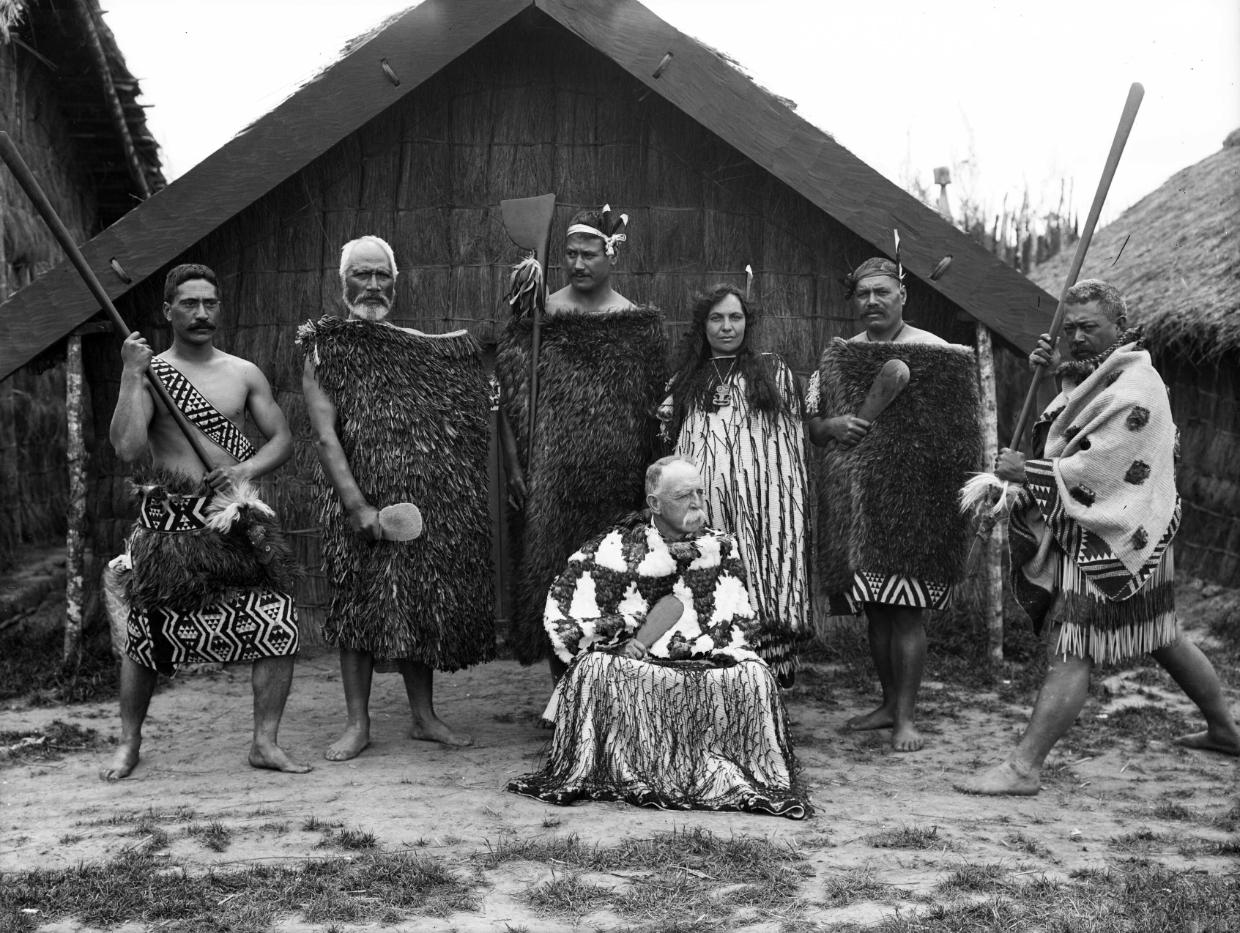
The model pā at the International Exhibition

The group performed at Crystal Palace, the Palace Theatre and White City and was accompanied by an exhibition of Māori artefacts, including a meeting house and storehouse. The tour was highly successful in terms of positive publicity and attention, however it was beset by financial problems. About half the group decided to stay in England, and four of the women married Englishmen. The remainder of the group returned to New Zealand in late 1911. Papakura was blamed both for the financial issues and for the group members who had not come back.

She stayed in New Zealand only briefly and then returned to England, where she continued a relationship with Richard Staples-Browne. She had first met him in 1907 when he had toured New Zealand. The couple were married in 1912 and they lived in Staples-Browne's country home in Oxfordshire, Oddington Grange.

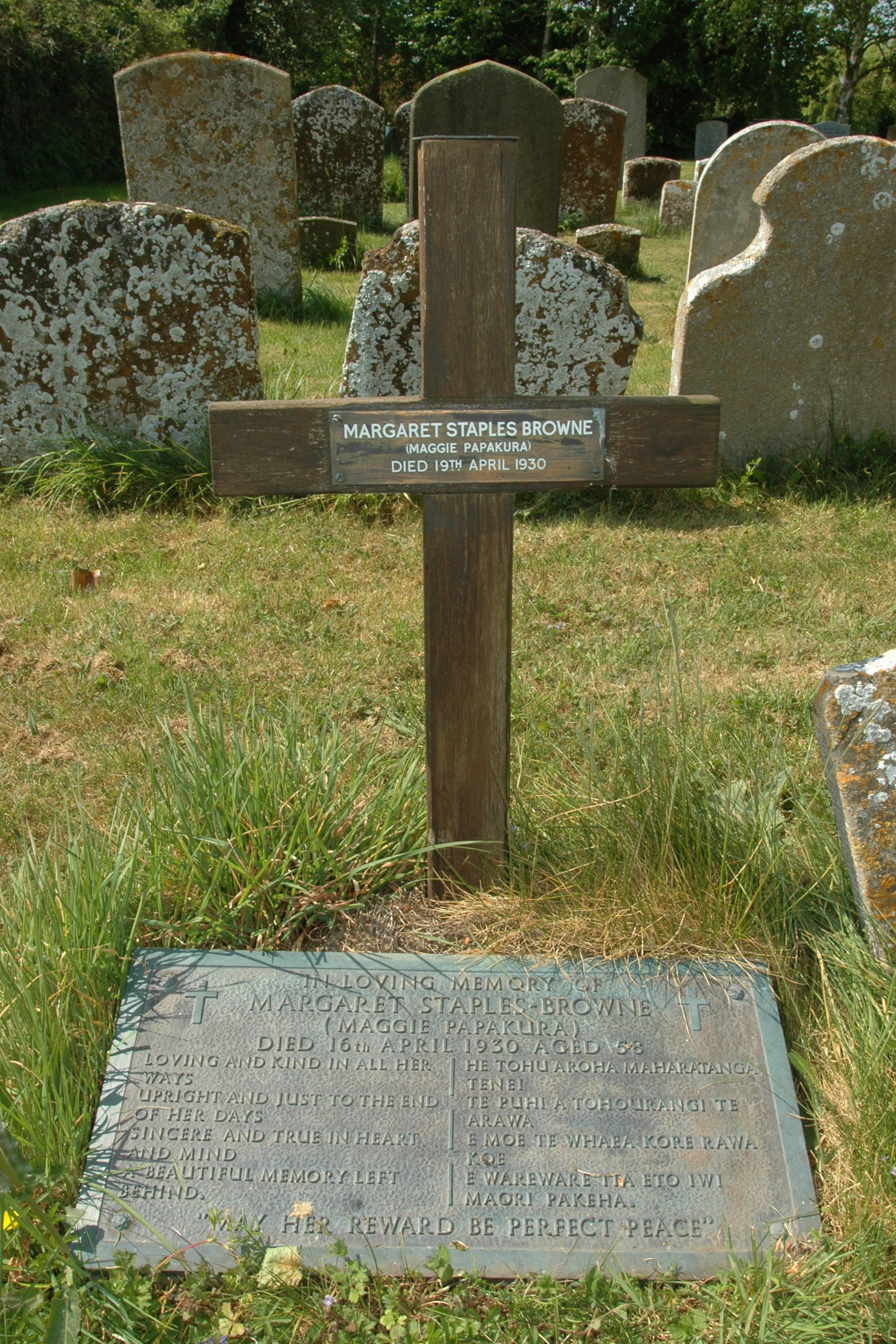
Margaret Staples-Browne's grave in Oddington

During World War I, Papakura and her husband opened their homes in Oxfordshire and London to injured New Zealand troops, and Papakura installed a memorial to fallen Australian and New Zealand Army Corps soldiers in the chapel at Oddington. In 1924, Papakura moved into Oxford and enrolled to study a Bachelor of Science degree in anthropology at the Society of Oxford Home-Students. At the Society, Papakura was a contemporary of the Indian feminist and future parliamentarian Seeta Parmanand. She wrote a thesis on Māori culture called The Old-Time Maori, taking it to the elders at Whakarewarewa for approval before submitting it. It was the first published ethnographic work by a Maori scholar. Papakura died suddenly three weeks before her thesis examination, on 16 April 1930 aged 56, from a ruptured aortic artery. She was buried, according to her wishes, in Oddington cemetery; her family in Whakarewarewa erected a memorial to her in the village the following year.

== Legacy ==
Papakura's thesis was published posthumously in 1938 by her friend and fellow Oxford anthropology student Thomas Kenneth Penniman as The Old-Time Maori. It describes and analyses the customs of Te Arawa from a woman's perspective, including aspects of daily life such as child-rearing and family relationships, which had previously been ignored by male writers. Papakura also corrected the erroneous assumptions of Pākehā ethnologists in her work, which was the first extensive published ethnographic work by a Māori scholar. The book was re-printed in 1986 by New Women's Press.

In 1993 works owned and created by Papakura formed part of the exhibition Ngā puna roimata o Te Arawa held at Te Papa that also featured works by Te Hikapuhi Wiremu Poihipi and Rangimahora Reihana-Mete.

In 2007, a biography of Papakura was published by Paul Diamond, Makereti: Taking Maori to the World, and she was the subject of an exhibition at the National Library of New Zealand.

Papakura's house, named after her ancestor Tuhoromatakaka and built by master carver Tene Waitere, still stands in the village at Whakarewarewa.

In 2017, Papakura was selected as one of the Royal Society Te Apārangi's "150 women in 150 words", celebrating the contributions of women to knowledge in New Zealand.

A collection of Māori artefacts owned by Papakura was donated to the Pitt Rivers Museum, along with her collection of photographs, genealogies and notes for her thesis, by her son William Francis Dennan, following her death.

In April 2025, the University of Oxford announced its intention to posthumously award Papakura a Master of Philosophy degree in anthropology. A ceremony took place at the Sheldonian Theatre, Oxford on 27 September 2025, when Papakura's descendant June Northcroft Grant accepted a MPhil Anthropology degree certificate on her behalf. More that 100 people travelled to the ceremony from Aotearoa New Zealand.

Papakura's book, The Old-time Maori, by Makereti, Sometime Chieftainess of the Arawa Tribe, Known in New Zealand as Maggie Papakura, published in 1938, was listed in Books of Mana as one of the 180 most significant works of Māori-authored non-fiction.
