= Rangitihi =

Māori rangatira (chief)

Rangitihi was a Māori rangatira (chief) in the Te Arawa confederation of tribes and ancestor of the largest iwi in the confederation, Ngāti Rangitihi. He fathered eight children, known as "the eight hearts of Rangitihi," who settled throughout the Rotorua Lakes District.

== Life ==
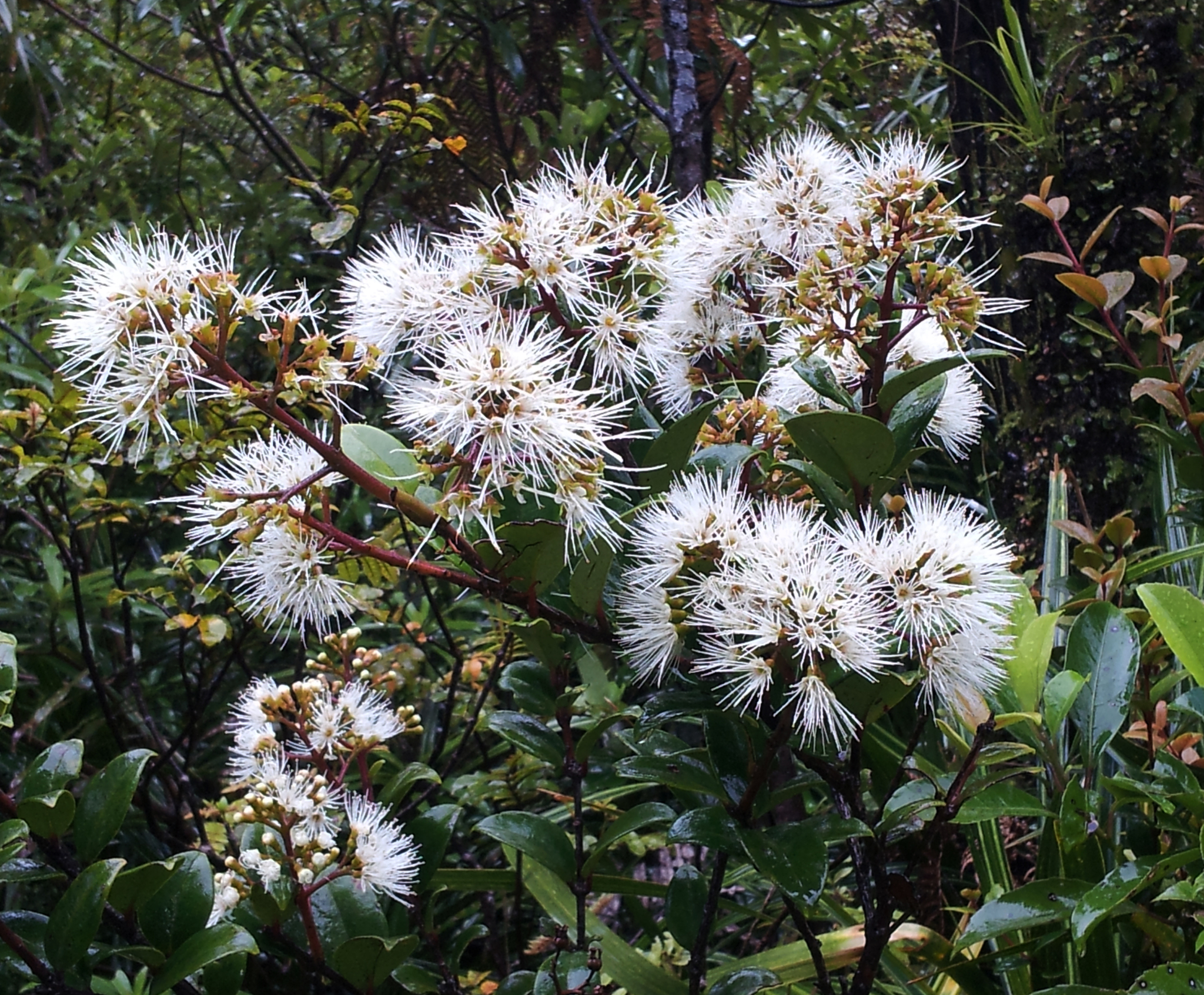
Akatea in bloom.

Rangitihi was born at Maketu in the Bay of Plenty, as the son of Uenuku-mai-rarotonga and Hinetu-te-rauniao. Both his parents were direct descendants of Tama-te-kapua, the captain of the Arawa. On his father's side he was also a descendant of Hatupatu. When he was an adult, Rangitihi departed from Maketu and established settlements of his own at Pakotore on the Kaituna River and at Matapara.

An important proverb is connected with him: Rangitihi upoko whakahirahira, no Rangitihi te upoko i takaia ki te akatea. Ehara ma te aitangia a Tiki, meaning "Rangitihi the proud and hard-headed one, Rangitihi whose head was bound with akatea. Well! He is a descendant of Tiki." Akatea, also known as white rātā, is a flowering vine, which was used to tie palisade walls in place. There are different accounts of the origin of this proverb. In one account, reported by D. M. Stafford, his head was split open by an enemy while he was leading a war party and his troops were about to flee, but he had his head tied together with akatea and led his men to victory. In the other account, which derives from Takaanui Tarakawa, his sons refused to conduct the funerary rites following his death, because they were afraid of getting the incantations wrong, which would result in their deaths. Eventually, however, one of his younger sons, Apumoana performed the rites, binding his father with akatea.

Rangitihi had eight children, known as "the eight hearts of Rangitihi". The youngest of these, Tūhourangi, may have been illegitimate and he was treated badly by his step-mothers and half-brothers. Seeing this, Rangitihi ordered him to climb onto the roof of the house at Pakotore and stand directly above the door. Then, he called all of his sons, except his eldest son and heir Rangiwhakaekeau, into the house, causing them to pass between Tūhourangi's legs - a mark of submission. When he revealed this to his sons, they realised that he favoured Tūhourangi over them, so they drove Tūhourangi out of Pakotore. He went to Lake Rotoiti, where he established a settlement called Ohoukaka. Later, Rangitihi travelled to Ohoukaka and gave Tūhourangi a lady named Rakeitahaenui as a wife. Probably after this, Rangitihi and Tūhourangi travelled to Tūranganui-a-Kiwa for the funeral of Ruapani. On this occasion Ruapani's widow, Roongomaipapa was remarried to Tūhourangi.

After this, Rangitihi travelled with his other seven sons to the Ohau Channel, between Lake Rotorua and Lake Rotoiti, where they established a settlement called Rangiwhakakapua. Subsequently his sons settled throughout the region.

Finally, Rangitihi returned to Pakotore or Matapara, where he died. His funeral has been recounted above. His bones were eventually interred in a cave on the Ruawahia cone of Mount Tarawera, where they were destroyed during the 1886 eruption.

== Family ==
Rangitihi married three sisters, Manawakotokoto, Rongomaiturihuia, and Kahukare. He also had a child by Papawharanui, either as his fourth wife or as the product of an affair while she was married to Marumatanui. She might have been a descendant of Waitaha or a sister of Ruapani. In total, he had eight children, known as "the eight hearts of Rangitihi".

The children by Manawakotokoto were:

- Kawatapuarangi, who settled at Puakoitoito on the Whakapoungakau block.

- Pikiao, ancestor of Ngāti Pikiao in Te Arawa, of Ngāti Mahuta in the Tainui confederation, and of Ngāti Pāoa in the Marutūāhu confederation.

- Rakeiao, who settled at Turingongo on the Whakapoungakau block, then at Waikare, near Mourea, then at Otamatea on Lake Tarawera, and finally at Ōkataina atop Mount Tarawera. He married Keapare and his niece Maruahangaroa

- Ngamahanga (by Keapare)

- Taketake

- Kahuūpoko, ancestor of Ngāti Kahuūpoko.

- Te Kawatapu (by Keapare)
- Rangiparo (by Keapare)
- Murimano (by Maruahangaroa), who married his step-sister Haungakuha.

- Hapuriri who married his cousin Tuteata:

- Rangikawekura, who married her great-great uncle, Kawatapuarangi

- Puhiawe (by Maruahangaroa)

- Apumoana, who settled at Owhatiura and then at Lake Rotokākahi.

- Rangitihimuia
- Tutepapa

The child by Rongomaiturihuia was:

- Ratorua, who settled at Pukemaire on the Whakapoungakau block and then at Owhatiura. He married Kauri:

- Whakairikawa
- Korohimoko
- Tuteata, who married her cousin Hapuriri.

The children by Kahukare were:

- Rangiwhakaekeau, the eldest son, who stayed at Rangiwhakakapua with his father. He had an illegitimate child with Uenuku-auiri of Te Teko and two other children:

- Rangiteaorere, ancestor of Ngāti Rangiteaorere.
- Tamatea-kitenukuroa
- Tutehuiao

- Rangiowhia, who settled on the southern shore of Lake Rotoiti.

- Mahi.

- Tauruao or Tauruwao, who stayed at Rangiwhakakapua with his father.

The child by Papawharanui was:

- Tūhourangi, ancestor of Tūhourangi, who settled at Ohoukaka on Lake Rotoiti. He married Rakeitahaenui and Rongomai-papa (daughter of Kahungunu and Rongomaiwahine, and former wife of Ruapani). He had two sons and a daughter:

- Uenukukōpako (son of Rakeitahaenui)
- Taketakehikuroa (son of Rakeitahaenui)
- Maruahangaroa (daughter of Rongomai-papa), who married Uenuku-koihu and her uncle Rakeiao

- Haungakuha (daughter of Uenuku-koihu), who married her half-brother Murimano (see above)

== Bibliography ==
- Tarakawa, T. (1894). "Coming of Matatua, Kurahaupo, etc, from Hawaiki". Journal of the Polynesian Society. 3: 59–71, 168–175, 199–207.
- Stafford, D.M. (1967). Te Arawa: A History of the Arawa People. Rotorua, New Zealand: A.H. & A.W. Reed.
- Jones, Pei Te Hurinui; Biggs, Bruce (2004). Ngā iwi o Tainui : nga koorero tuku iho a nga tuupuna = The traditional history of the Tainui people. Auckland [N.Z.]: Auckland University Press. ISBN 1869403312.
- Neich, Roger (2001). Carved histories: Rotorua ngati tarawhai woodcarving. Auckland, N.Z: Auckland University Press. ISBN 9781869402570.
