= Lakes of Rotorua =

The region around the city of Rotorua, in New Zealand's North Island, contains several lakes which have a total area of about 250 square kilometres (97 square miles). The term Rotorua lakes is ambiguous as it has been used historically for a New Zealand administrative area. From biggest to smallest, these are Lake Rotorua (Second Lake), Lake Tarawera, Lake Rotoiti (Small Lake), Lake Rotomā (White Lake), Lake Ōkataina, Lake Rotoehu (Muddy Lake), Lake Rotomahana (Warm Lake), Lake Rerewhakaaitu, Lake Rotokākahi (Green Lake), Lake Ōkareka and Lake Tikitapu (Blue lake). There are also smaller lakes including: Lake Okaro, Lake Rotokawa (not to be confused with Lake Rotokawa near Taupō), Lake Rotokawau and Lake Rotongata (Mirror Lake). Most of the lakes have formed due to volcanic activity and some have current geothermal activity. The region is part of the Taupō Volcanic Zone, the world's most active area of explosive silicic volcanic activity in geologically recent time.

== Geography ==
Rotorua lakes statistics
Name	Area	Elevation	Coordinates	Notes/References
Lake Rotorua	79.8 km^{2} (30.8 sq mi)	280 m (920 ft)	38°05′S 176°16′E	
Lake Tarawera	41.0 km^{2} (15.8 sq mi)	298 m (978 ft)	38°12′S 176°27′E	,
Lake Rotoiti	34.3 km^{2} (13.2 sq mi)	279 m (915 ft)	38°02′20″S 176°25′40″E	
Lake Rotomā	11.2 km^{2} (4.3 sq mi)	316 m (1,037 ft)	38°02′51″S 176°35′16″E	
Lake Ōkataina	10.7 km^{2} (4.1 sq mi)	309.1 m (1,014 ft)	38°07′S 176°25′E	
Lake Rotoehu	8.1 km^{2} (3.1 sq mi)	295 m (968 ft)	38°1′S 176°32′E	
Lake Rotomahana	8.9 km^{2} (3.4 sq mi)	338.7 m (1,111 ft)	38°16′S 176°27′E	
Lake Rerewhakaaitu	5.1 km^{2} (2.0 sq mi)	434.9 m (1,427 ft)	38°18′S 176°30′E	
Lake Rotokākahi (Green Lake)	4.3 km^{2} (1.7 sq mi)	394.9 m (1,296 ft)	38°13′S 176°20′E	
Lake Ōkāreka	3.3 km^{2} (1.3 sq mi)	353.6 m (1,160 ft)	38°10′S 176°22′E	
Lake Tikitapu	1.4 km^{2} (0.54 sq mi)	417.3 m (1,369 ft)	38°12′S 176°20′E	,

Larger Rotorua Lakes

== Lake Rotorua ==
Lake Rotorua is the largest of the lakes with Lake Tarawera close behind, it is also the second largest lake in the North Island by surface area and covers 79.8 square kilometres (30.8 square miles). With a depth of only about 10 metres (33 feet) it is smaller than Lake Tarawera by water volume. The lake lies within a large volcanic caldera in the Taupo Volcanic Zone. After an eruption, the magma chamber underneath the volcano collapsed. The depression left behind is the Rotorua Caldera. Mokoia Island, is close to the middle of the lake and is the setting for the legendary tale of Hinemoa and Tūtānekai.

== Lake Tarawera ==
Lake Tarawera is the second largest lake with a surface area of 41.0 square kilometres (15.8 square miles). It is filled partially by sub surface sources from the surrounding lakes including nearby Blue and Green lakes (or Lake Rotokākahi and Lake Tikitapu) associated with the Ōkataina Caldera. Lake Tarawera is home to various eels and rainbow trout. During the summer the lake is popular for both fishing and water sports, and also camping as there a number of hot water beaches. Lake Tarawera's outflow is at its north end, into the Tarawera River, which flows further into the Pacific Ocean.

== Lake Rotoiti ==
Lake Rotoiti is the third largest lake in the Bay of Plenty region of New Zealand. It is the westernmost in a chain of lakes formed within the Ōkataina Caldera. The lake is close to the northern shore of its most famous neighbour, Lake Rotorua, and is connected by the Ohau Channel. The Māori-language name "Rotoiti" means "the little lake". The lake covers an area of 34.3 square kilometres (13.2 square miles).

== Lake Rotomā ==
Lake Rotomā is the fourth largest lake in the Bay of Plenty region of New Zealand. It is the easternmost lake in a chain of three lakes to the north-east of Lake Rotorua in New Zealand's North Island. The others are Lake Rotoiti and Lake Rotoehu. Lake Rotomā formed within the Rotomā Caldera after lava flows blocked its outlet about 10,000 years ago. It is located exactly half-way between the city of Rotorua and town of Whakatāne. The lake covers an area of 11.2 square kilometres (4.3 square miles).

== Lake Ōkataina ==
Lake Ōkataina is the largest of four smaller lakes lying between Lake Rotorua and Lake Tarawera in the Bay of Plenty region of New Zealand's North Island. The others are Lake Rotokākahi (Green Lake), Lake Tikitapu (Blue Lake), and Lake Ōkāreka. Unlike many other lakes in the region, Lake Ōkataina is completely encircled by native forest. It also has no inlets or outlets. After the 1886 eruption of Mount Tarawera the lake level increased, to a maximum height about 1930 which dropped to closer to present levels after the 1931 Hawke's Bay earthquake. The lake is now about 10 m (33 ft) above its pre 1886 level but fluctuates by about 5 m (16 ft). The lake covers an area of 10.7 square kilometres (4.1 square miles).

== Lake Rotoehu ==
Lake Rotoehu is the smallest lake in a chain of three lakes near Lake Rotorua in New Zealand's North Island. It is located between the city of Rotorua and town of Whakatāne. It is fed by Lake Rotomā to the east, and flows westward joining Lake Rotoiti. The lake is one of the least visited, but offers great kayaking and fishing (rainbow trout). The lake covers an area of 8.1 square kilometres (3.1 square miles).

== Lake Rotomahana ==
Lake Rotomahana is a small lake in northern New Zealand, located 25 kilometres (16 miles) to the east of Rotorua. It is immediately south-west of the volcano Mount Tarawera, and its geography was substantially altered by a major eruption in 1886. The lake covers a surface area of 8.9 square kilometres (3.4 square miles).

=== Pink and White Terraces ===
The Pink and White Terraces were a natural wonder located on the shores of the lake. They were considered to be the eighth wonder of the natural world and were New Zealand's most famous tourist attraction during the mid 19th century. They were considered lost in the Mount Tarawera eruption on 10 June 1886 until in 2016 a forgotten survey was rediscovered in Switzerland. This suggested the Pink and White Terrace locations may lie on land; raising the possibility the sites may be investigated and any surviving sections of the terraces recovered or made open to public view.

== Lake Rerewhakaaitu ==
Lake Rerewhakaaitu is a small, shallow lake in northern New Zealand, located to the east of Rotorua. It is immediately south of the active volcano Mount Tarawera, and its geography was substantially altered by the 1886 eruption. The lake covers a surface area of 5.1 square kilometres (2.0 square miles).

== Lake Rotokākahi (Green Lake) ==
Lake Rotokākahi or Green Lake, is one of four small lakes lying between Lake Rotorua and Lake Tarawera in the Bay of Plenty region of New Zealand's North Island. The others are Lake Tikitapu (Blue Lake), Lake Ōkāreka, and Lake Ōkataina. Named by the Māori for its abundance of shellfish, it flows to Lake Tarawera via the Te Wairoa waterfalls. It appears emerald green from the air due to its shallow, sandy bottom. The lake is 394.9 metres (1,296 feet) above sea level and 69 feet below the level of the neighbouring Lake Tikitapu. The lake is largely undisturbed due to no nearby roads or towns. The lake covers a surface area of 4.3 square kilometres (1.7 square miles).

== Lake Ōkāreka ==
Lake Ōkāreka is one of four small lakes lying between Lake Rotorua and Lake Tarawera, in the Bay of Plenty region of New Zealand's North Island. The others are Lake Rotokākahi (Green Lake), Lake Tikitapu (Blue Lake), and Lake Ōkataina. This lake has an adjacent settlement of approximately 600 people. The lake covers a surface area of 3.3 km^{2} (1.3 sq mi).

== Lake Tikitapu (Blue Lake) ==
Lake Tikitapu or Blue Lake, is the smallest of four small lakes lying between Lake Rotorua and Lake Tarawera in the Bay of Plenty region of New Zealand's North Island. The others are Lake Rotokākahi (Green Lake), Lake Ōkāreka, and Lake Ōkataina. Along with the others, Lake Tikitapu lies within a volcanic caldera formed within the last 300,000 years. The blue colour of the lake can be attributed to rhyolite and pumice on the lake bed. The lake has no visible outlet, however subsurface flow drains towards Lake Tarawera. The lake has a surface area of 1.4 square kilometres (0.54 square miles).

== Smaller lakes ==
Lake Okaro is south of the Waimangu Volcanic Rift Valley which extends south-west from Lake Rotomahana and the valley contains the Southern Crater Lake, Frying Pan Lake (claimed to be the world's largest hot spring lake, although many of the lakes named above have partial hot spring sources), and Infernal Crater Lake. Lake Rotokawau to the east of Lake Rotorua is a crater lake in a line with Lake Rotongata and Lake Rotoatua which are all believed to have formed following a basaltic dyke extrusion related to the Ōkataina Caldera. There are multiple other small bodies of water, many without official names.
