= Hikapuhi =

Māori folk healer

Te Hikapuhi Wiremu Poihipi
- Born: Rotorua
- Died: January 6, 1934; Rotorua
- Resting place: Te Wharetāinga Moko, near Lake Rotoiti (Bay of Plenty)
- Other names: Hikapuhi, Hikapuhi Clayton
- Occupation: Healer
- Spouse: Alfred Clayton (m. 1906)
- Children: 11

Te Hikapuhi Wiremu Poihipi, known as Hikapuhi, (died 6 January 1934) was a New Zealand Māori healer who came to prominence in 1905. She was regarded by European and Māori authorities of her time as a nuisance, frequently prescribing patients with brandy, but for many who sought her help, she was their only provider of medical care.

She was also an accomplished weaver and examples of her weaving were acquired by the Colonial Museum (now Te Papa) to demonstrate patterns of kete whakairo.

== Biography ==
Poihipi was born in Rotorua, the tenth and youngest child of Wiremu Poihipi and Hārete Ngāputu. The year of her birth is recorded by Te Papa as 1850, but in the Dictionary of New Zealand Biography her birth is estimated as between 1860 and 1871. Her mother, Hārete, was of Ngāti Te Rangiunuora, a hapū of Ngāti Pikiao, and her father may have been as well. Te Papa also records her as affiliated to Ngāti Whakaue iwi.

In 1906, Hikapuhi married Alfred Clayton, a surveyor from Tasmania; they had at least eight daughters and three sons together.

She became a healer and midwife and was well known for her knowledge of both Māori and European medicine. Hikapuhi's medical practices were scrutinised by government officials under the Tohunga Suppression Act 1907 however she continued to provide health care.

She was also an accomplished weaver and practiced tā moko (facial tattooing). In 1914 Augustus Hamilton, the director of the Colonial Museum, purchased from her two samplers of weaving patterns specially made for display in the museum. The samplers feature ten different patterns of weaving, typical of the patterns used in kete (baskets).

Hikapuhi died in 1931, and was buried at Te Wharetāinga Moko, near Lake Rotoiti.
