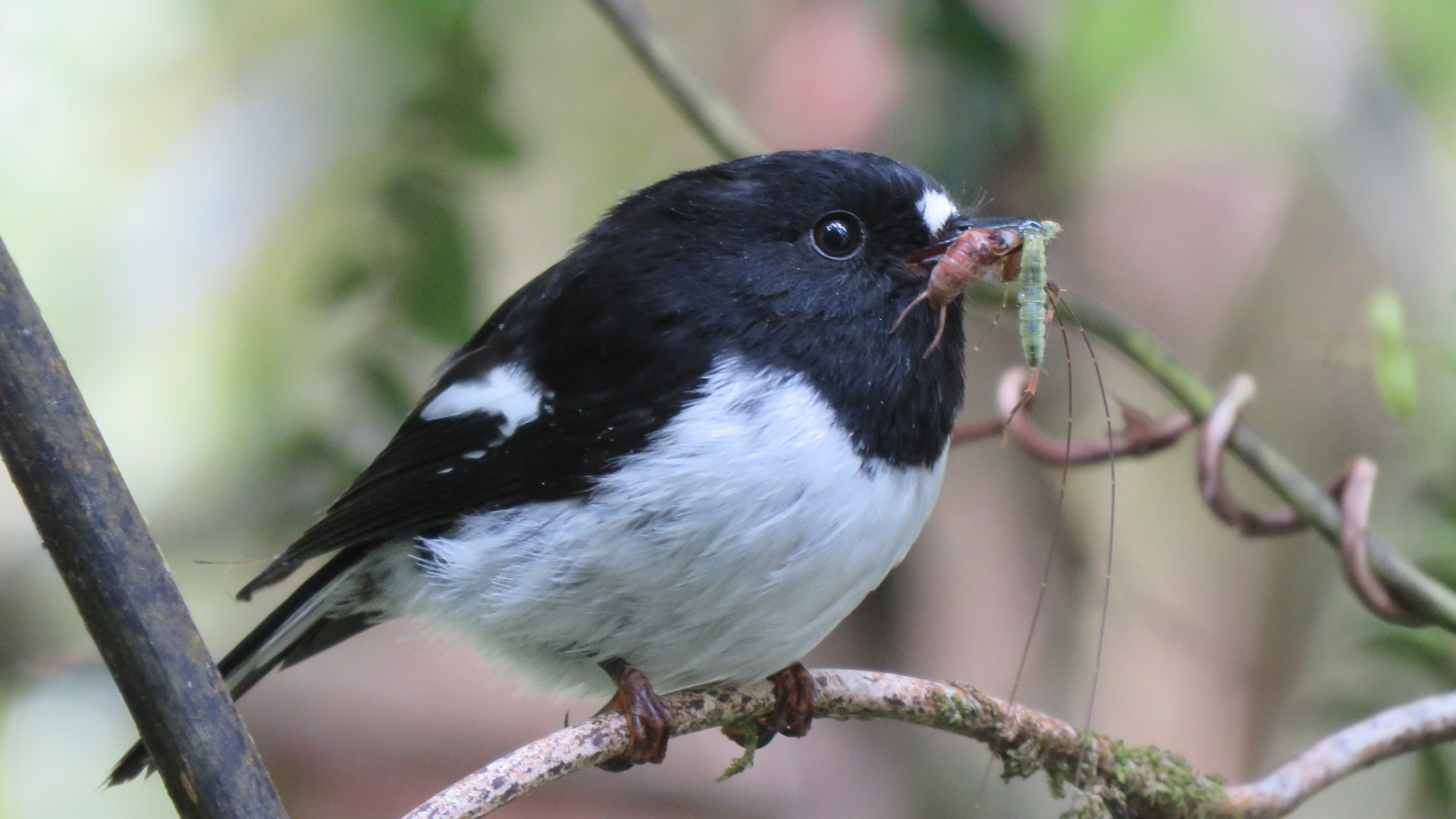
- North Island subspecies (male)
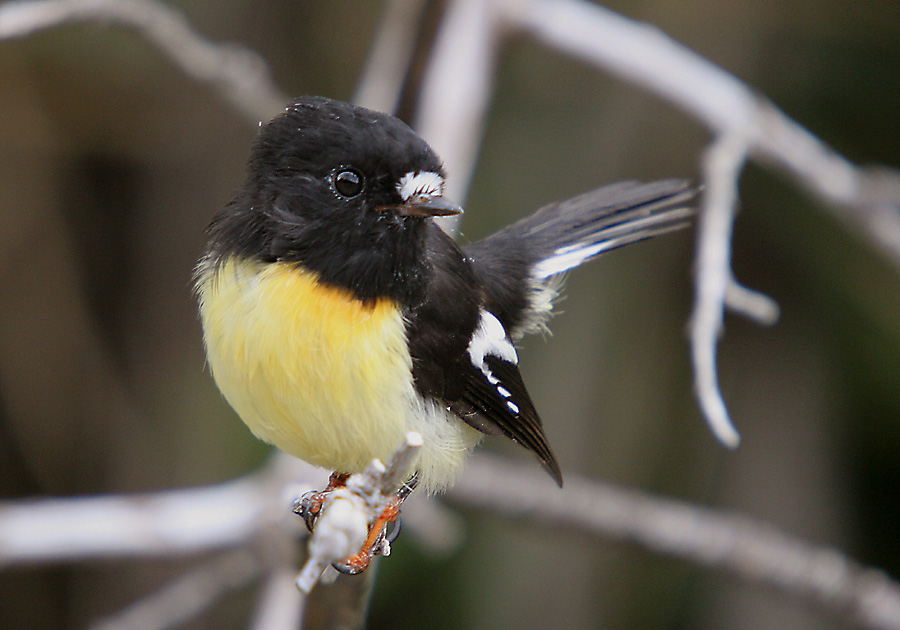
- South Island subspecies (male)

Conservation status
- Least Concern (IUCN 3.1)

Scientific classification
- Kingdom: Animalia
- Phylum: Chordata
- Class: Aves
- Order: Passeriformes
- Family: Petroicidae
- Genus: Petroica
- Species: P. macrocephala

Binomial name
- Petroica macrocephala (Gmelin, JF, 1789)

Audio
- Recording of a North Island tomtit at Pūkaha National Wildlife Centre

= Tomtit =

Passerine bird native to New Zealand

The tomtit (Petroica macrocephala) is a small passerine bird in the family Petroicidae, the Australasian robins. It is endemic to the islands of New Zealand, ranging across the main islands as well as several of the outlying islands. In the Māori language, the North Island tomtit is known as miromiro and the South Island tomtit is known as ngirungiru. This bird has several other Māori and English names as well. There are several subspecies showing considerable variation in plumage and size. The species is not threatened and has adapted to the changes made to New Zealand's biodiversity.

== Taxonomy ==
The tomtit was formally described in 1789 by the German naturalist Johann Friedrich Gmelin in his revised and expanded edition of Carl Linnaeus's Systema Naturae. He placed it with the tits in the genus Parus and coined the binomial name Parus macrocephalus. Gmelin based his account on the "great-headed titmouse" that had been described and illustrated in 1783 by the English ornithologist John Latham in his book A General Synopsis of Birds. The naturalist Joseph Banks had provided Latham with either a specimen or a painting of the tomtit. The bird was seen at Queen Charlotte Sound on the north coast of New Zealand's South Island during James Cook's second voyage to the Pacific Ocean. Banks owned a painting of the bird by Georg Forster who had accompanied Cook on the voyage. This picture is now held by the Natural History Museum in London.

The tomtit is now placed with 13 other species in the genus Petroica that was introduced in 1829 by the English naturalist, William Swainson. The generic name combines the Ancient Greek petro- "rock" with oikos "home". The specific epithet macrocephala is from the Ancient Greek makrokephalos meaning "great-headed". The word combines makros meaning "long" with kephalē meaning "head".

The tomtit is one of four species of the genus Petroica found in New Zealand, the ancestors of which colonised from Australia. The species was once thought to have been descended from the scarlet robin, although more recent research has questioned this. It seems likely that there were two colonisation events, with the North Island robin and the South Island robin descended from one event, and the black robin and tomtit from another.

Other English names have been used for this species including New Zealand tomtit, black tomtit, pied tomtit and yellow-breasted tit or tomtit. The term tomtit was originally a shortened form of Tom titmouse. Either form has been used to describe a number of small birds, but in England tomtit was most commonly used as an alternate name of the blue tit. The word tit is today used for a number of small birds, especially of the family Paridae. Originally, it was used for any small animal or object.

Five subspecies are recognised. Each subspecies is restricted to one of the islands or island groups. Four of these five subspecies have been elevated to full species in the past (the Chatham subspecies was retained with the South Island tomtit), but genetic studies have shown that these subspecies diverged relatively recently.

- P. m. toitoi (Lesson, RP & Garnot, 1828) – North Island and satellites (New Zealand)
- P. m. macrocephala (Gmelin, JF, 1789) – South and Stewart Island and satellites (New Zealand)
- P. m. dannefaerdi (Rothschild, 1894) – Snares Islands (south of South Island, New Zealand)
- P. m. chathamensis Fleming, CA, 1950 – Chatham Islands (east of South Island, New Zealand)
- P. m. marrineri (Mathews & Iredale, 1913) – Auckland Islands (south of South Island, New Zealand)

== Description ==
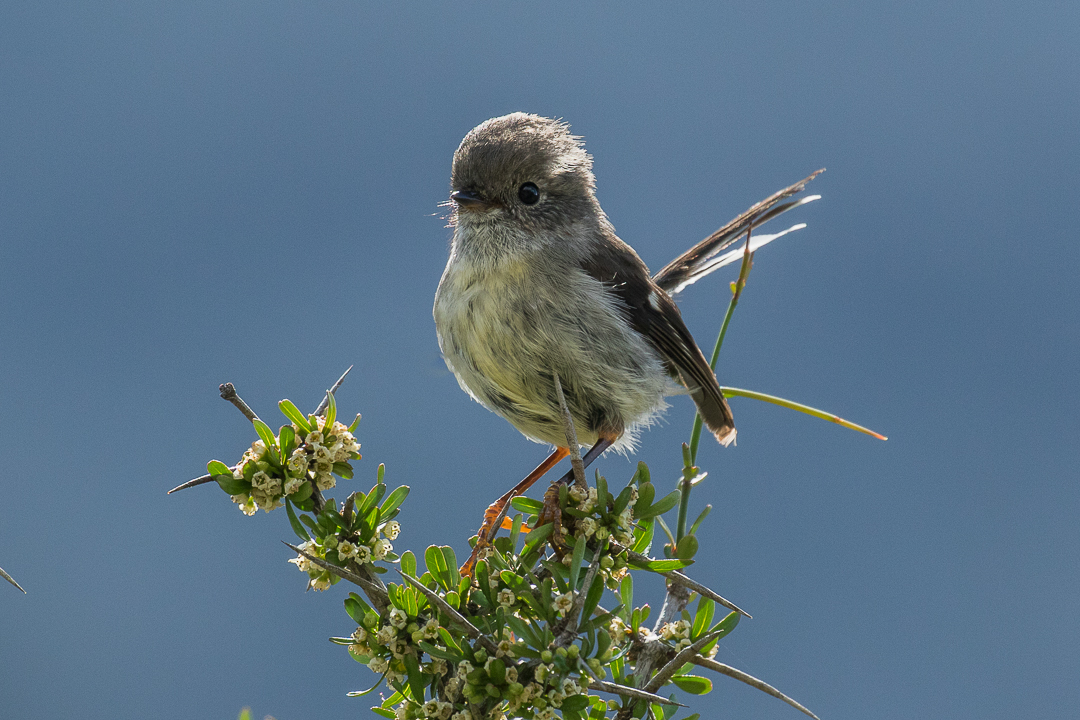
Female tomtits have a browner plumage than the males.

The tomtit is a small (13 cm, 11 g) bird with a large head and a short bill. The male North Island subspecies has black head, back, wings (with a white wing-bar), and a white belly. The subspecies from South Island, the Chatham Islands, and Auckland Islands are similar, but have a yellow band across the breast between the black head and white belly. The females are brown instead of black. The Snares Island subspecies is entirely black, and is known as the black tit.

The island subspecies of tomtits show a striking variation in body size, being considerably larger than their mainland relatives, a tendency known as the Foster's rule or the island effect. Birds from the main islands weigh around 11g, compared with birds from Snares Island, which weigh in at 20 g.

== Behaviour ==
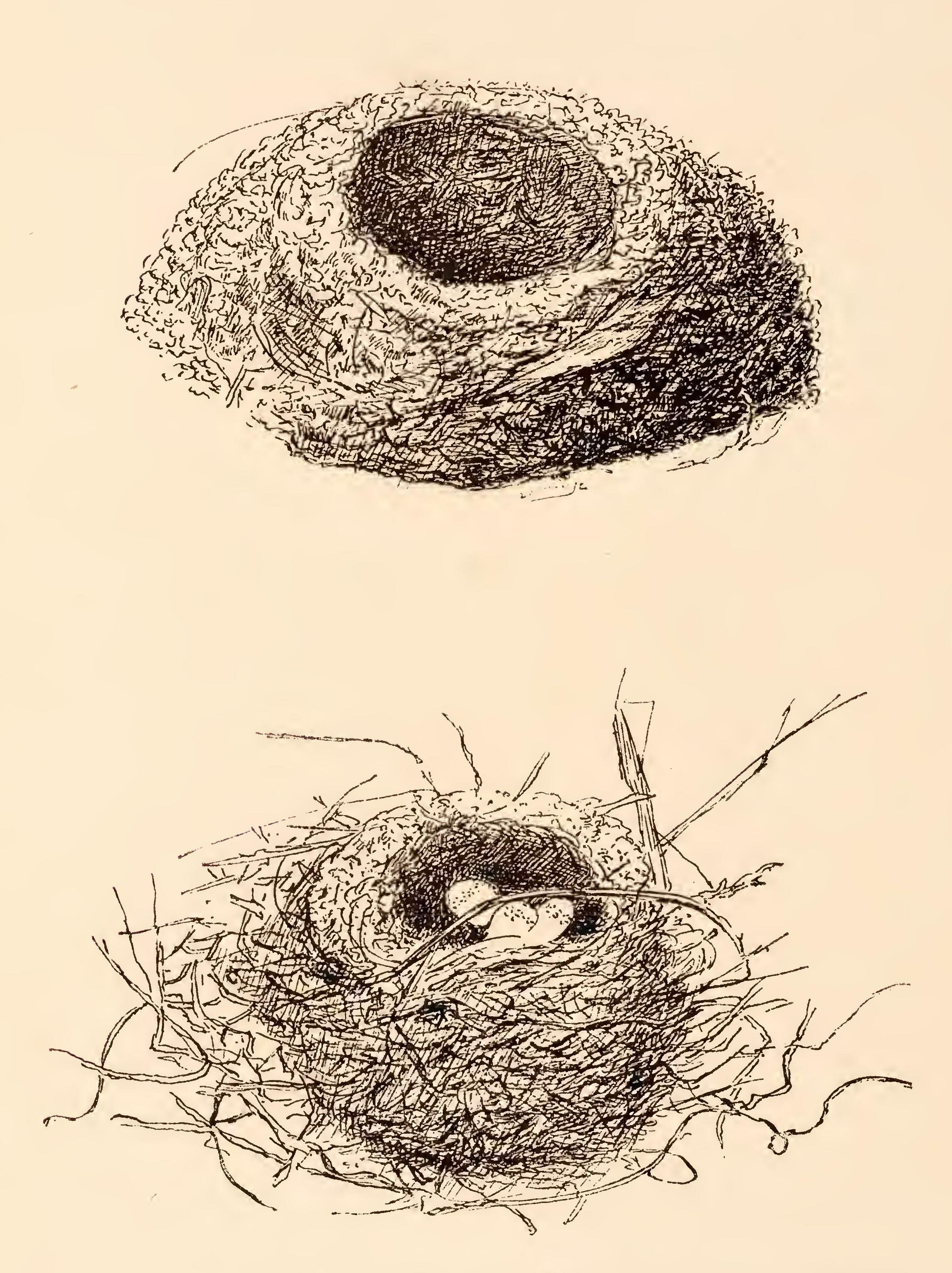
Illustration of South Island tomtit nests (1888)

=== Food and feeding ===
The tomtit is mostly an insectivore, feeding on small invertebrates, such as beetles, caterpillars, spiders, moths, wētā, earthworms, and flies. Fruit is taken during the winter and autumn. Most subspecies feed in vegetation, waiting on a perch and watching for prey. Insects are also gleaned from branches and leaves. The Snares subspecies feeds on the ground as well, in a similar fashion to the North or South Island robins.

=== Breeding ===
Breeding takes place from September to February. The nest is placed in a hole in a tree, in a tangle of vines and sometimes on a sheltered ledge or bank. The bulky nest is built by the female but the male sometimes brings material. The clutch usually contains 3–4 creamy white eggs which are covered with light-brown or grey spots. The eggs are laid at daily intervals soon after sunrise, and measure around 18.2 mm × 14.9 mm (0.72 in × 0.59 in). They are incubated by the female and hatch after a period of 15–17 days. The altricial nidicolous chicks are initially almost naked and are brooded by the female. Both parents feed the young and remove the faecal sacs. The chicks fledge when 17 to 20 days of age. Both parents continue feeding them for another ten days, although the male will feed them alone if the female re-nests. Pairs often raise two or three broods in a season.

== Cultural depictions ==
The miromiro features in Māori traditional stories. Te Arawa tradition tells how Te Rongorere used a pet miromiro to help him search for his mother, Te Aotepairu, who had been carried away from the Bay of Plenty to Whangaruru in Northland.

== Sources ==
- Higgins, P.J.; Peter, J.M., eds. (2002). "Petroica macrocephala New Zealand tomtit" (PDF). Handbook of Australian, New Zealand & Antarctic Birds. Vol. 6, Pardalotes to Strike-thrushes. Melbourne, Victoria: Oxford University Press. pp. 629–648. ISBN 978-0-19-553762-8.
- Stafford, D.M. (1967). Te Arawa: A History of the Arawa People. Rotorua, New Zealand: A.H. & A.W. Reed.
