= Taketakehikuroa =

New Zealand Māori rangatira (chief)

Taketakehikuroa was a Māori rangatira (chief) of the Tūhourangi iwi (tribe) in the Te Arawa confederation. He joined in the conquest of Mokoia Island in Lake Rotorua by Te Arawa, but subsequently quarrelled with his brother and left for Ohoukaka on Lake Rotoiti. There he divided the territory between his two sons, Tuteamutu and Te Wiwiniorongo.

== Life ==
Taketakehikuroa was born at Ohoukaka on Lake Rotoiti. His father was Tūhourangi, ancestor of the Tūhourangi iwi, through whom he was descended from Tama-te-kapua, the captain of the Arawa by multiple lines. His mother was Rakeitahaenui. He had one full brother, Uenukukōpako, and a half-brother, Maruhangaroa.

=== Conquest of Mokoia ===
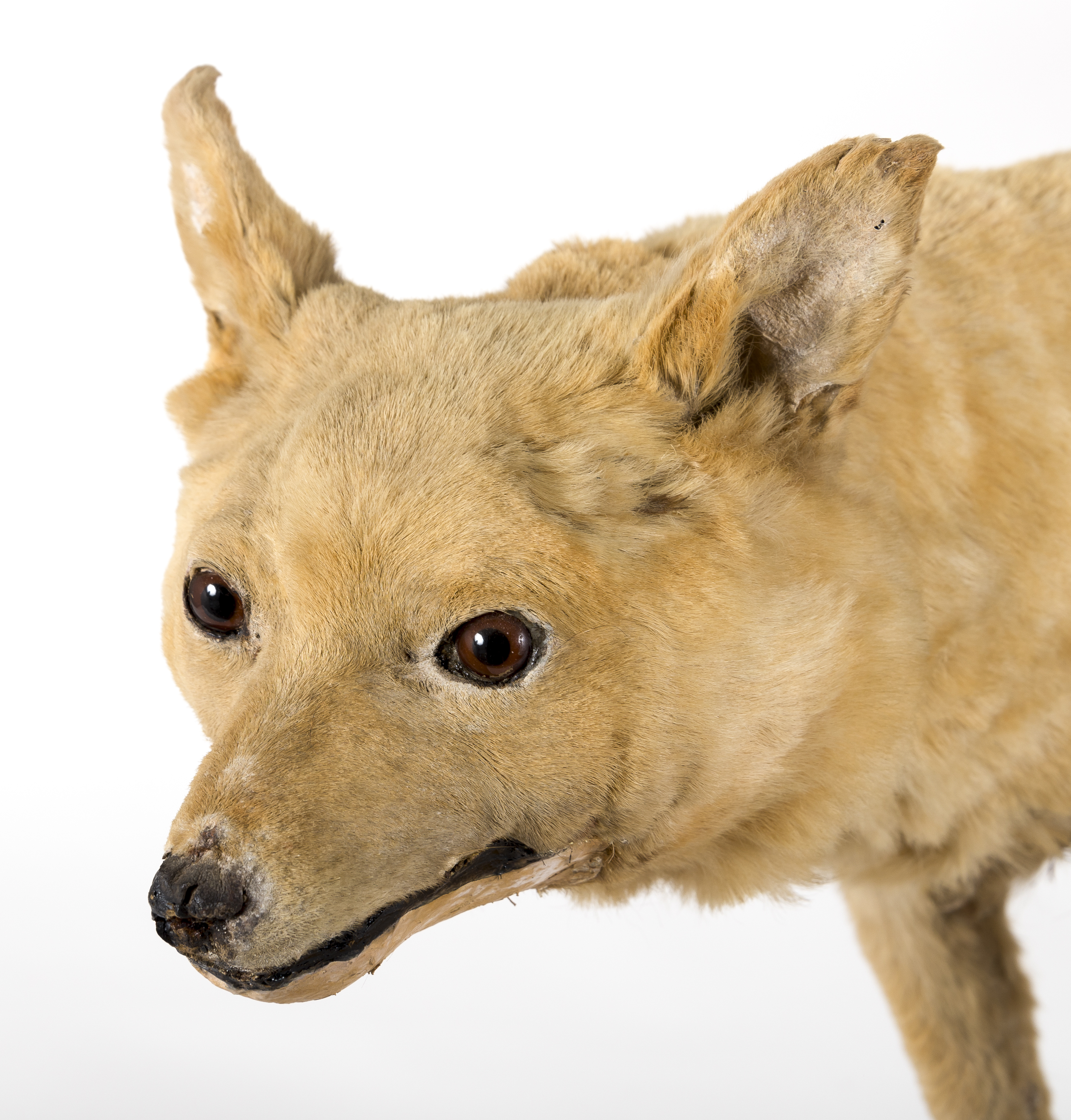
Kurī (Māori dog)

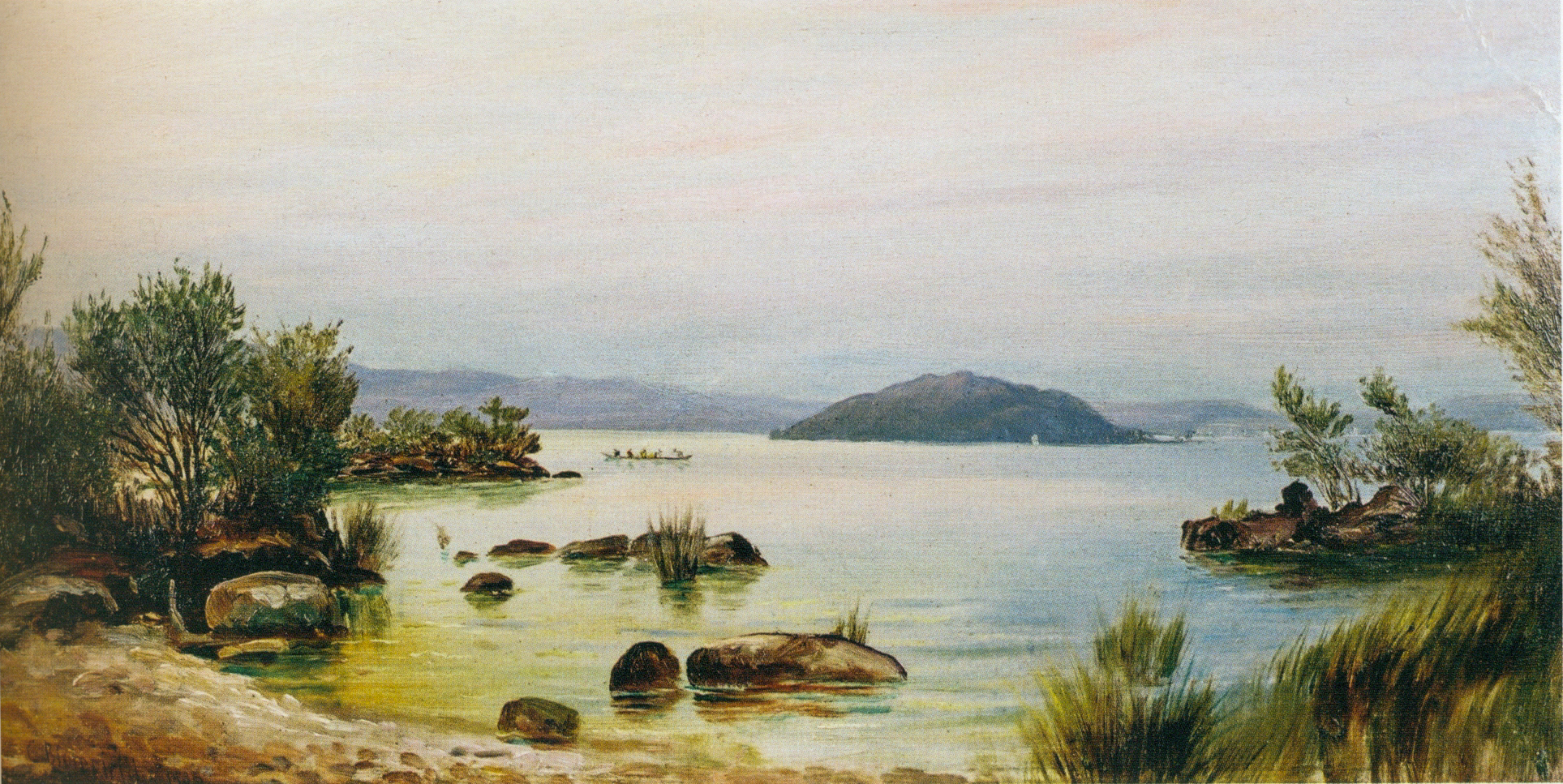
Mokoia Island, painting by Charles Blomfield, 1908

When Uenukukōpako and Taketakehikuroa were grown up and married, they decided to visit their wives' families at Maroanuiatia. They took a canoe through the Ohau channel to Ohinemutu and as they went past Mokoia Island, Uenukukōpako's dog, Potakatawhiti jumped out and swam to the island. Since the dog would not get back in the boat, Uenukukōpako asked the residents of Mokoia Island, who were led by Kawaarero, to look after the dog. But when he returned from his trip, he found out that Kawaarero had killed the dog. Uenukukōpako and Taketakehikuroa led a war party in an attack on Mokoia in revenge, but the defenders stood in the water and overturned the attacker's canoes as they came into shore, forcing them to retreat. They attacked a second time with the aide of their paternal uncle, Rangiwhakaekeau, but were defeated again.

At this point, Rangiteaorere, an illegitimate son of Rangiwhakaekeau, arrived from Te Teko and agreed to participate in a third attack on Mokoia, so long as he was given leadership of the expedition. Rangiteaorere swam out in the night and planted a stump in the lakebed near the shore of Mokoia and attached a rope to it. When the attackers approached the island in their canoes the next morning, Kawaarero waded out into the water to overturn the canoes, but Rangiteaorere grabbed onto the rope and used it to pull his canoe past the defenders and straight to the shore. They then attacked the defenders from behind and killed them. Kawaarero fled to the highpoint of the island or to a rock off the shore, but Rangiteaorere killed him. The attackers also killed the chiefs Arorangi, Mamaku, Matariki, Ouepo, Te Arai, Maungaroa, and Parakiri and most of the other inhabitants of the island. The bay where the battle had taken place was named Te Koupaengatangata ("the stump overthrows the people"). The survivors fled to the mainland, where Uenukukōpako attacked them at Mataiahurangi (near Te Ahuaha-pakahu stream), at Te Pihapiha pā, and Wharangi pā. The survivors fled via Okareka and Tikitapu to the Waikato.

After the battle, Uenukukōpako and Taketakehikuroa both settled on Mokoia. Taketakehikuroa declared a particular hot spring to be tapu, but Uenukukōpako ordered his wife Taoitekura to wash their newborn daughter in the spring anyway. Taketakehikuroa appealed to Rangiteaorere, who decided that Uenukukōpako had done no wrong, and Taketakehikuroa left the island.

== Division of Paengaroa and Rotoiti ==
After leaving Mokoia, Taketakehikuroa split his time between Ohoukaka on Lake Rotoiti and Pakotore pā at Paengaroa. There he had two sons: Tuteamutu and Te Wiwiniorongo, who continued to live with him at Pakotore when they grew up and got married. The elder married his cousin Te Aorauru, daughter of Uenukukōpako, while Te Wiwiniorongo married Te Aotepairu, a woman of Waitaha. Taketakehikuroa established an eel trap on the Kaituna River, just after the Hururu stream flows into it, which was called Te Moanaporohe-a-Taketakehikuroa or Te Rotoporohe-a-Taketakehikuroa ("Taketakehikuroa's sea or lake of spawn"). After one trip to this eel trap, Te Aorauru accused Te Aotepairu of shirking the work. She and Te Wiwiniorongo were so offended that they left Pakotore and went to Taketakehikuroa at Ohoukaka. He decided to split his lands between the two sons to avoid further conflict, giving Paengaroa to Tutamutu and Ohoukaka to Te Wiwiniorongo.

== Family ==
Taketakehikuroa had two sons:

- Tuteamutu
- Te Wiwiniorongo, who married Te Aotepairu, a descendant of Hei.

- Te Rongorere

- Paekitawhiti, who married Tūwharetoa i te Aupōuri, as his senior wife.

- Hineteao

== Bibliography ==
- Grace, John Te Herekiekie (1959). Tuwharetoa: The history of the Maori people of the Taupo District. Auckland [N.Z.]: A.H. & A.W. Reed.
- Mitchell, J. H. (2014). Takitimu: A History of Ngati Kahungunu. Libro International. ISBN 978-1-877514-72-2.
- Stafford, D.M. (1967). Te Arawa: A History of the Arawa People. Rotorua, New Zealand: A.H. & A.W. Reed.
- Steedman, John Aramete Wairehu (1977). Ngā Tūpuna o Rāhera Te Kahu Hiapo: The Ancestors of Rāhera Te Kahu Hiapo. Tauranga: Bay print.
