= Lake Rotomā =

Lake in the North Island of New Zealand

- Lake Rotoma
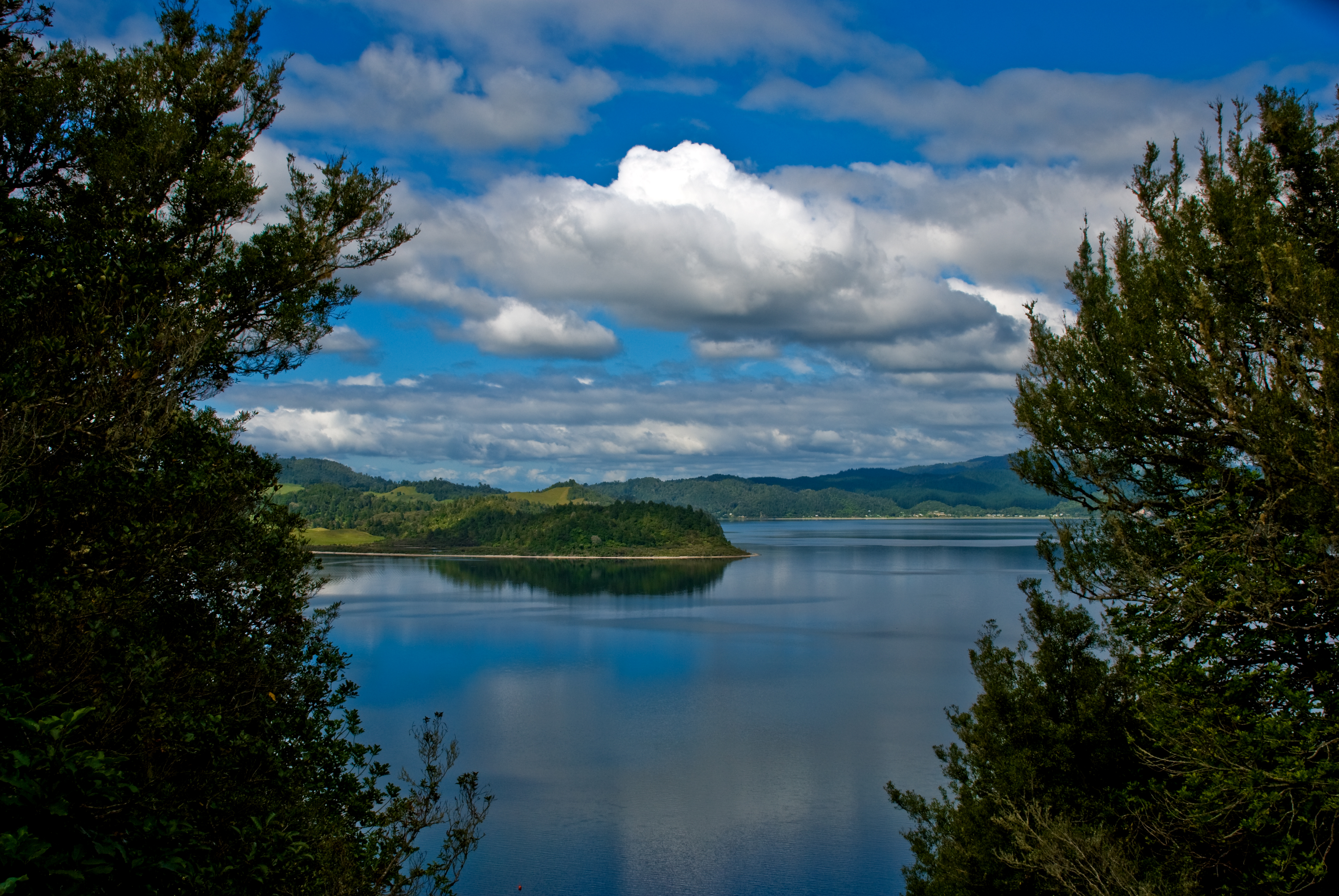
- Lake Rotomā

- Location within North Island Location within New Zealand
- Interactive map of Lake Rotomā
- Location: Rotorua Lakes, Bay of Plenty Region, North Island
- Coordinates: 38.0476°S 176.5878°E
- Lake type: Crater lake
- Basin countries: New Zealand
- Max. length: 5.2 km (3.2 mi)
- Max. width: 4.7 km (2.9 mi)
- Surface area: 11.2 km^{2} (4.3 sq mi)
- Average depth: 38.6 m (127 ft)
- Max. depth: 83 m (272 ft)
- Surface elevation: 316 m (1,037 ft)
- Islands: 1 sunken island

Lake Rotomā (also spelled Rotoma) is the fourth largest lake of the 11 lakes in the Rotorua Lakes district in the Bay of Plenty Region of New Zealand's North Island. Lake Rotomā is the easternmost in the chain of three lakes to the northeast of Lake Rotorua The other two are Lake Rotoiti and Lake Rotoehu. Rotomā is located halfway between the city of Rotorua and town of Whakatāne.

Lake Rotomā has a high water quality with visibility up to around 13 m (43 ft) deep. The lake has a maximum depth of 83 m (272 ft) in the northern part and 73.5 m (241 ft) in the southern part.

== Geography ==
Lake Rotomā was formed within the Rotomā Caldera when lava flows from a large crater explosion blocked its outlet 9,500 years ago. The hills fringing the south and east of the lake are made up of rhyolite from eruptions from its own caldera, the Haroharo and Tarawera vent alignments, all in the Ōkataina Volcanic Centre. Inflow is from rainfall, three small streams and several springs around the lake. Some of the springs on the shore of the lake, such as those at Ohei are warm. Lake Rotomā has no surface outlets and outflow studies suggest flow is through a porous pumice substrate towards the west into Lakes Rotoehu and Rotoiti. The water level of Rotomā reaches an excessive high or low level every 10–15 years. In times of extreme low levels, the sunken island "Motutara" in the lake may be exposed.

== History ==
The lake was part of the area named as the Hot Lakes district in a 1878 publication, with the name continuing in use in the early 20th century when the first road access was constructed. Although there is evidence of previous Maori settlement it had no local Maori population at the time of road construction in 1895.

=== Road ===
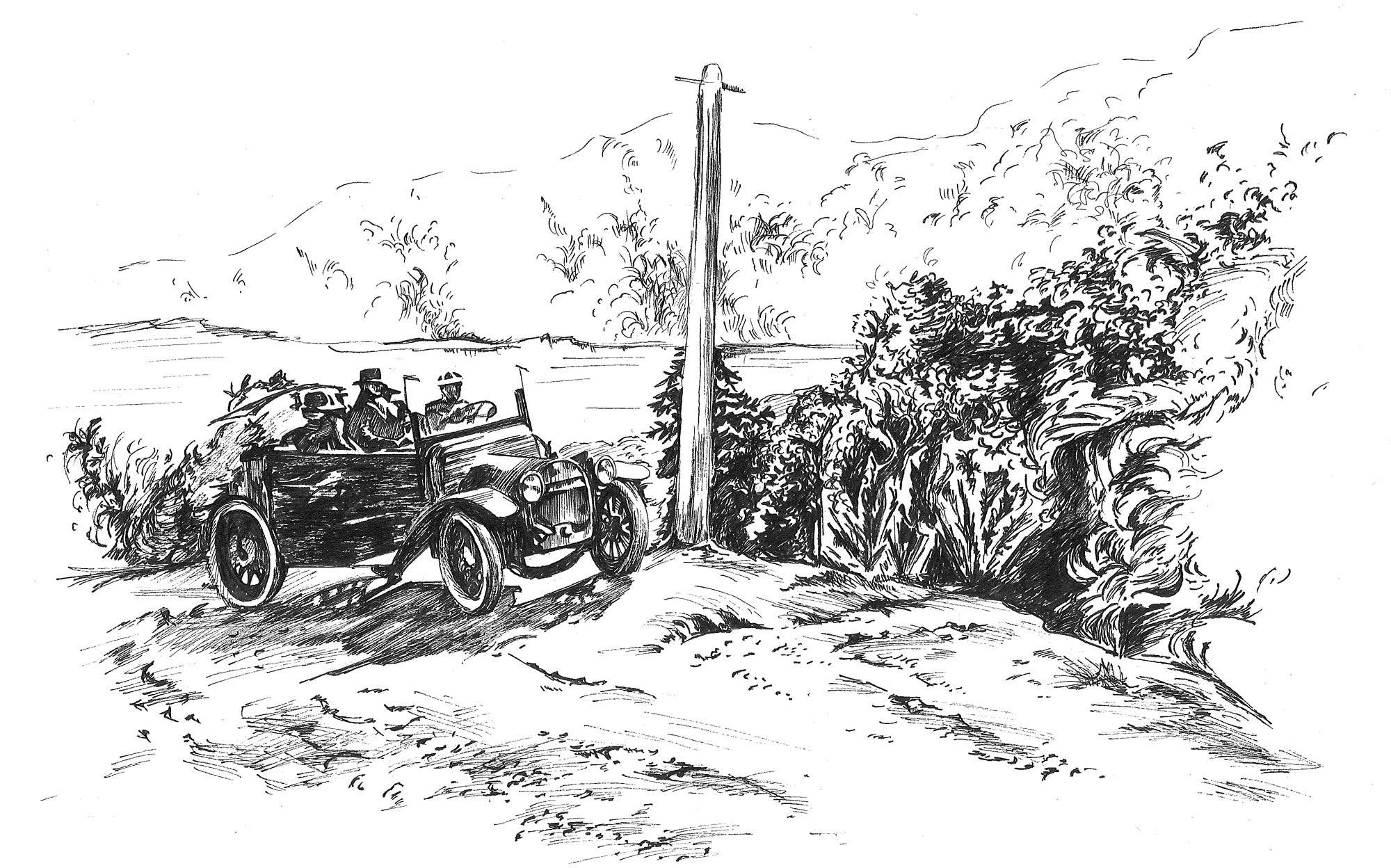
Tourists on the Rotomā hill. Drawn from a "Weekly News" photograph dated 9 May 1918

Before the road around Lake Rotomā was constructed, there were several Māori trails over the Rotomā hill which could be used to get between Rotorua and the Eastern Bay of Plenty by foot, but these trails were too narrow and uneven to be used by horses. Travellers from Rotorua could only get as far as Tikitere on the rough track. In May 1895 work commenced on the Tikitere to Rotoma road. By July, there were three road gangs working on different sections of the road, and work began over the difficult section over the Rotomā hill in the summer of 1895–1896. A proper road was also constructed from Te Ngae in Rotorua through to Tikitere.

Once the road was completed, horse-drawn traffic commenced and public coaching services began. The first such service was started in 1907 by the R.M. Company, who ran a service twice a week from Rotorua to Ōpōtiki carrying mail and up to three passengers. In 1910 the R.M. Company upgraded to a large coach drawn by five horses which could hold 10 passengers. In 1916 Colletts of Rotorua started the first regular motor car service, using Cadillac service cars. The average travel time from Rotorua to Whakatāne was 5 hours, but like the horse-drawn coaches, the service cars could take up to 9 hours to travel this distance depending on the driving conditions. The road surface gradually improved, decreasing the travel time to 3 hours by the late 1920s. Today, this journey takes just one hour and 20 minutes.

In 1947, 60 men were employed on the construction of the Rotorua to Whakatāne highway, as increases in traffic had caused problems on the road which was barely 12 ft (3.7 m) wide. In the winter of 1956 the lake level of Rotomā rose very high, causing the road to be shifted to higher ground. More serious flooding occurred in 1962, and the famous "cheese cutting" landmark was destroyed and used to build up the road. The cheese cutting was a large wedge shaped rock formed during road construction in 1895–1896 when the road gangs cut the road through a hill with picks and shovels and left a portion of the hill standing.

=== Establishments ===
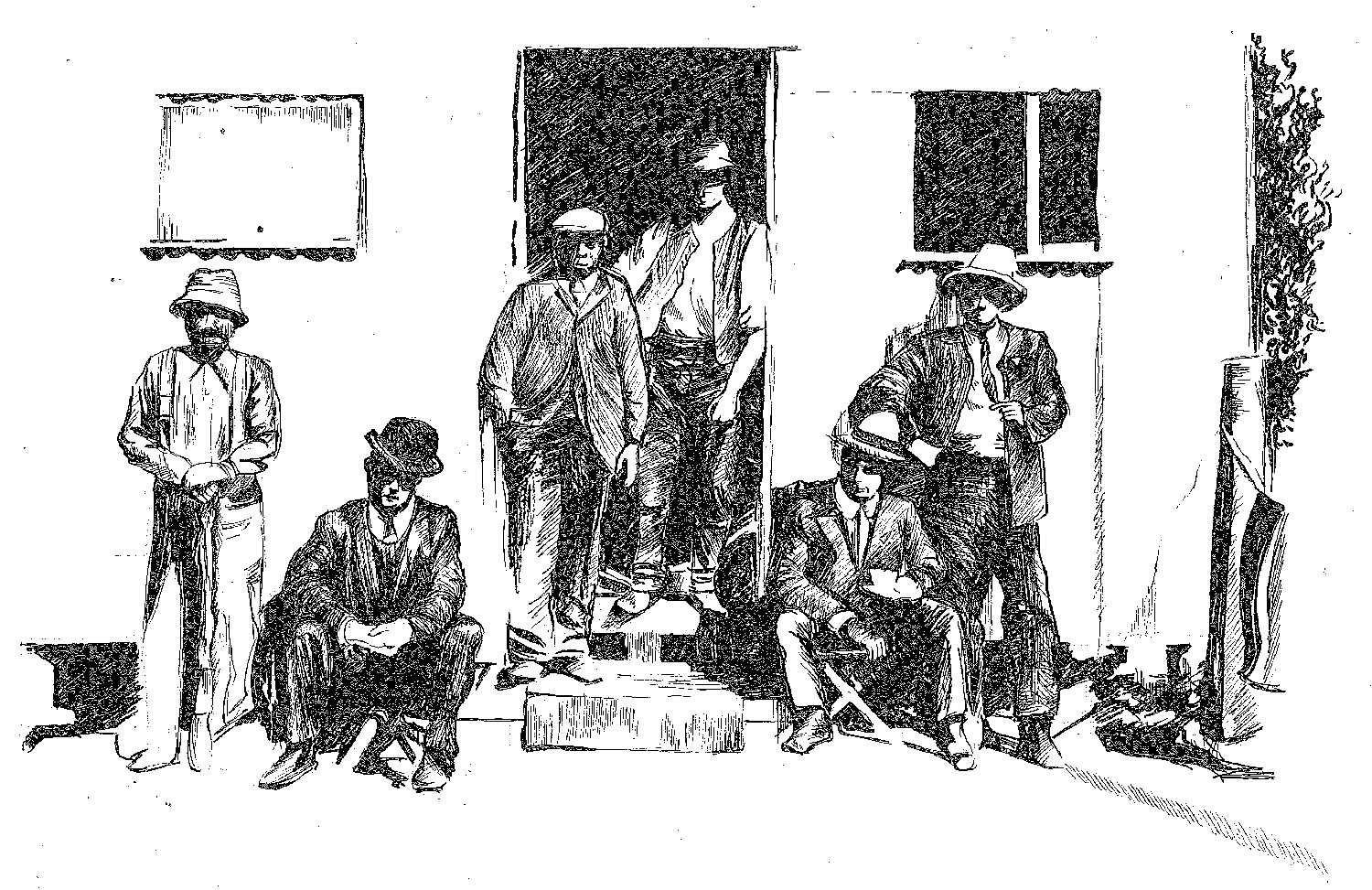
Drawing of travellers outside J.Baker's Tearooms and Post Office at Lake Rotomā, c1900

Various establishments have come and gone at Rotomā, and most were set up to service the passing traveller's desire for rest stops, refreshments and accommodation.

==== Past establishments ====
- "Rotoma Tearooms and Post Office", later renamed "The Kettle Store and Tearooms", then "The Kettle Store and Garage".
- "T & K Service Station"
- "Stillwater Lodge & Motel"
- "Rotoma Accommodation House"
- "El Toreador Dine and Dance"
- "Atkinson's Fishing Lodge", later renamed "Merge Lodge"
- "Rotoma Traders"

In 1912 it could take up to 9 hours to cover the distance between Rotorua and Whakatāne, and changing stations for the horses had been set up every 14 miles (23 km) from Rotorua. The changing station at the west end of Rotomā became a popular rest stop. John Baker ran a post office and tearooms here, and built up a reputation for his corned beef. Mr. Baker offered the traveller a choice of corned beef with potatoes and cabbage or corned beef sandwiches.

The Pilbrow family arrived in Rotomā in 1948 after purchasing the Rotoma Tearooms and Post Office. They expanded the business to include a general store, and renamed it The Kettle Store and Tearooms. They then built a garage for motor repairs, and the business became The Kettle Store and Garage. Petrol pumps were later installed by the Pilbrow family to create T & K Filling Station. There was an extremely high level of rainfall in 1961 which caused serious flooding problems, and the business was badly affected. The floodwater raised the petrol tanks out of the ground and the road had to be built up to act as a stop-bank. A pump was in action 24 hours a day for weeks to prevent the water from completely flooding the premises. The Pilbrow family also created Oxford Road.

The original homestead which became known as Atkinson's Fishing Lodge was built early in the 1900s by Mr and Mrs C. Atkinson who farmed near the lake and had an orchard on the opposite side of the road. The homestead was turned into a lodge which became very popular with fishermen. The lodge was renamed Merge Lodge by Geoff and Roy Warwick, formerly of Kawerau, who took over ownership in 1960. The lodge had six bedrooms, a billiard room, two kitchens, two lounges, and a store out the front. There is now a caravan park at the site of Merge Lodge.

==== Education ====
- Lake Rotomā School

=== "Suicide Beach" ===
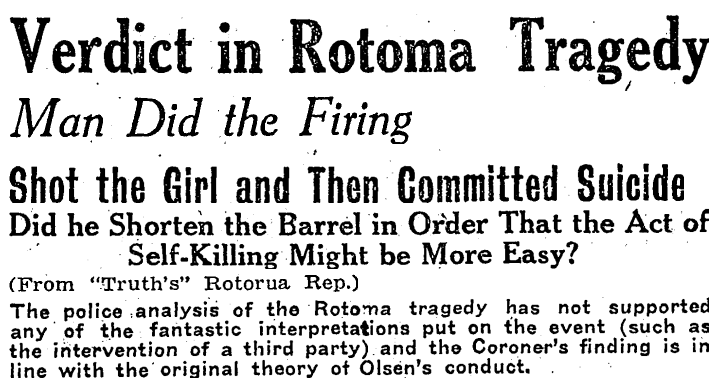
Headline from an article about the murder-suicide in "NZ Truth" newspaper, 9 May 1925

The bay at the foot of the Rotomā hill where Manawahe Road commences had the nickname "Suicide Beach" in the past due to the occurrence of a murder-suicide there in May 1925. The real story was lost over time, with the majority of Rotomā local residents holding the belief that it had been a young honeymoon couple who committed suicide there together. However, in actuality it was a 38-year-old man and a 14-year-old girl; understood to have been romantically attached. The man, Carl Olsen, had told the girl's father of his love for her. In an attempt to separate the pair, the disapproving parents sent the girl, Molly Moors, to live with an aunt in Hastings. Without her aunts knowledge, Olsen picked Molly up in his car and it was assumed they were on their way to Hamilton when they met death at the shores of Rotomā. The event was well covered by newspapers of the time and was referred to as the "Rotoma Tragedy". Olsen and Moors are buried next to each other in the Rotorua Cemetery, and their graves were probably originally marked with wooden crosses. The original crosses disintegrated over time leaving the two graves unmarked for many years before being remarked with new matching wooden crosses in May 2011.

=== Sunken island ===
Four buoys in the southern portion of Lake Rotomā mark the location of Motutara, the sunken island, which sits just under the lakes surface. Occasionally the lake level drops low enough to expose the top of the island. There was once a Māori village on the island, and according to the legend, an old Tohunga resided there amongst the other inhabitants. His name was Te Rarau-mai-Waho, and he was very powerful and dangerous. The cloud the old Tohunga cast over the island was lifted only on the occasions where he went to visit some of his relations in Kawerau and around Putauaki, Mount Edgecumbe. One night he returned from such a visit and called out to the people of the island from the lake's edge by Matahi lagoon, ordering them to send him a canoe. Nobody responded to his demands, and in his anger the Tohunga put a curse on the island and its inhabitants. The people of the island heard the angry Tohunga's terrible screams, but did not realise the horrible retribution he would take. The curse caused the island to slowly sink, and by morning it was completely underwater; the only signs of the village being bodies and pieces of wreckage floating on the surface of the lake. Some people had escaped by swimming to the shore of the lake, and these people eventually settled in the South Island. The Waikato Underwater Club has examined Motutara. Two platforms or terraces were found, and some hāngī stones were found at the peak. It has been suggested that if the Pā had been palisaded it may have still been there today.

== Settlement ==
Statistics New Zealand describes Rotomā as a rural settlement, which covers 0.83 km^{2} (0.32 sq mi). It had an estimated population of 260 as of June 2025, with a population density of 313 people per km^{2}. The settlement is part of the larger Rotoiti-Rotoehu statistical area.

Historical population
Year	Pop.	±% p.a.
2006	222	—
2013	180	−2.95%
2018	267	+8.21%
2023	258	−0.68%
The 2006 population is for a smaller area of 0.72 km^{2}. Source:

Rotomā had a population of 258 in the 2023 New Zealand census, a decrease of 9 people (−3.4%) since the 2018 census, and an increase of 78 people (43.3%) since the 2013 census. There were 129 males and 126 females in 129 dwellings. 2.3% of people identified as LGBTIQ+. The median age was 54.8 years (compared with 38.1 years nationally). There were 33 people (12.8%) aged under 15 years, 21 (8.1%) aged 15 to 29, 141 (54.7%) aged 30 to 64, and 66 (25.6%) aged 65 or older.

People could identify as more than one ethnicity. The results were 80.2% European (Pākehā), 32.6% Māori, 5.8% Pasifika, and 4.7% other, which includes people giving their ethnicity as "New Zealander". English was spoken by 98.8%, Māori by 12.8%, and other languages by 7.0%. New Zealand Sign Language was known by 1.2%. The percentage of people born overseas was 12.8, compared with 28.8% nationally.

Religious affiliations were 27.9% Christian, 1.2% Buddhist, 1.2% New Age, and 2.3% other religions. People who answered that they had no religion were 59.3%, and 9.3% of people did not answer the census question.

Of those at least 15 years old, 45 (20.0%) people had a bachelor's or higher degree, 150 (66.7%) had a post-high school certificate or diploma, and 39 (17.3%) people exclusively held high school qualifications. The median income was $33,100, compared with $41,500 nationally. 15 people (6.7%) earned over $100,000 compared to 12.1% nationally. The employment status of those at least 15 was 87 (38.7%) full-time, 39 (17.3%) part-time, and 3 (1.3%) unemployed.

=== Early settlement ===
The early road construction crews commented on the lack of Māori settlement in Rotomā and in the neighbouring Lake Rotoehu. However, fortified pā sites, food pits, cultivation areas and burial sites have been discovered around the shoreline of Rotomā and the surrounding hills . The tribe Ngāti Tūwharetoa may not have lived permanently at Rotomā but at least took out a temporary camping existence there to take advantage of the hunting and fishing opportunities on offer. Later, Ngāti Tūāhuriri, a sub-tribe of Ngāti Pikiao took up residence at Rotomā. Māori living at nearby Rotoiti credited the frequent conflict between Māori and Pākehā as the cause of the dispersion of this Māori population, and they had left Lake Rotomā by the time the road construction began in 1895.

A census for the years 1874 to 1891 shows nil for Rotomā. In 1896 a census shows a population of 33, understood to be the occupants of the camp set up for the road workers and their families at the east end of Oneroa beach by the lagoon.

=== Oxford Road ===
In 1948, Mr and Mrs T.H. Pilbrow and their children arrived at Lake Rotomā from Oxford in Canterbury. They had purchased the Rotoma Tearooms and Post Office, which was situated on 25 acres (10 ha) of land. In a district of predominantly leasehold land, the Pilbrows realised the value of their freehold land and decided to subdivide it in 1950. Sixty-three sections were surveyed, the majority each a quarter acre, and four of these were taken by the Rotorua County Council for a reserve. Seventeen sections were along the main road, but a new road was required to access the sections to the rear. The Pilbrows named the new road "Oxford Road" as a reminder of their hometown.

== Education ==
Lake Rotomā School is a co-educational state primary school for Year 1 to 8 students, with a roll of 21 as of March 2026.

The first school was opened on 2 February 1928 in the old tearooms building with Mr. E.G. Sutherland teaching the 8 students. Mr Sutherland stated that it was "probably the worst building in New Zealand. However, when the weather was too bad we just declared a holiday – and nobody seemed to worry" A new school was built and opened in its present location on Soda Springs Road on 25 May 1936 with 29 students.

The roll fluctuated due to numerous residents living at Rotomā on a temporary basis. The mills in the area, Tunnicliffe's Mill and Rendall's Mill, helped establish a more stable population at Rotomā and caused further overcrowding at the school. In 1973 the roll reached 55 and there were appalling working conditions for staff and children. On 14 August 1973 the majority of parents kept their children at home as a protest against the lack of action to improve standards. There was widespread media coverage and in October the Minister of Education ordered that a new school be built, and it was opened on 16 November 1974.

From 1948, Mr Tam Pilbrow operated the first bus service to the school, using a Hillman car. In 1952 the service was taken over by George Graham, and Mr. Pilbrow's son Ken, who operated a Bradford van from the Kettle Store. Mr Gavin Wyllie bought the Kettle Store and Garage, and in 1958 he commenced transporting children to the school in his V.W combie van, but when Rendall's Mill closed at the end of that same year, there were not enough children for him to continue the service.

== Conservation ==
Due to invasive plant introduction, the native plants have been outcompeted within the lake and crayfish populations have declined considerably. The local tribe Te Arawa has been involved in efforts to remove the invasive weeds and restore the crayfish populations by attaching woven flax mats called uwhi to the bottom of the lake that limit the growth of the invasive plants while the thinner native plants are able to thrive. Burlap and rubber mats were unsuccessful as they would lift off the lake bottom from the accumulated gas from the decaying plants.
