= Ngāti Pikiao =

Māori iwi (tribe) in Aotearoa (New Zealand)

- Iwi (tribe) in Māoridom
- Rohe (region): Bay of Plenty
- Waka (canoe): Arawa
- Population: 17,196

Marae of Ngāti Pikiao of Te Arawa, Bay of Plenty.

Ngāti Pikiao is a Māori iwi (tribe) of New Zealand. They are one of the iwi within the Te Arawa tribal confederation. Their rohe (territory) centres on Lake Rotoiti and the area east of the Kaituna River in the Bay of Plenty.

== History ==
Ngāti Pikiao claim descent from Pikiao and his first wife Rakeiti, who settled together at Owhata by Lake Rotorua, probably in the early seventeenth century. Pikaio was a descendant of Rangitihi and Tama-te-kapua, who captained the Arawa canoe from Hawaiki to New Zealand. Pikiao and Rakeiti had a number of daughters but no sons. Rakeiti declared tera, Te Takapuwhaia te tuhera ("Te Takapuwhaia [a stream in Lake Rotoiti] is still open"), meaning that she still had time to bear a male child, which has become a proverb. However, Pikiao chose instead to leave her and travel to Waikato, where he married Rerei-ao and had a son Hekemaru, ancestor of Ngāti Mahuta and Ngāti Pāoa of the Hauraki Gulf. Subsequently, Pikiao returned to Rakeiti in Rotorua and had further sons with Rakeiti, as she had predicted: Tamakari and Morewhati.

=== Conflict with Tūtānekai ===
Morewhati, was given a shark's tooth earring called Tuperenui by Tūtānekai but traded it away for a feather cloak called Iringangarangi, so Tūtānekai killed him. At Mourea, Morewhati's brother, Tamakari criticised Tūtānekai severely for this, so Tūtānekai killed him as well and stuck the heads of the brothers on two stakes which were used to mark fishing grounds on Lake Rotorua. These stakes came to be called Morewhati and Tamakari and were still in place until the late nineteenth century. A relative of Morewhati and Tamakari, Tiukahapa, convinced her husband Taharangi to allow her to go out in a canoe in the night, remove the two heads, and bring them back to Ngāti Pikiao. When Tūtānekai heard about this, he went to punish Tiukahapa, but Taharangi interceded and convinced Tūtānekai to let Tiukahapa go unpunished. After this, Ngāti Pikiao relocated from Owhata to Lake Rotokakahi and Lake Tarawera.

Claiming to be grateful to Tūtānekai for his forebearance with Tiukahapa, Ngāti Pikiao invited Tūtānekai and the people of Mokoia to come to Motutawa island on Lake Rotokakahi in order to agree a peace treaty. This was a ruse and the Mokoia people, led by Tūtānekai's father-in-law, Umukaria, were ambushed and killed at Rotokakahi. Tūtānekai got revenge by attacking Ngāti Pikiao's pā at Moura on Lake Tarawera. However, Ngāti Pikiao were not at Moura when it was taken, but at Te Puwha on the eastern side of Taraera. After the attack they moved to Matata, then to Otamarakau and Pukehina, before being invited to Te Puia on Lake Rotoehu by Matarewha.

=== Conquest of Lake Rotoiti ===
Tūtānekai made peace with Ngāti Pikiao and persuaded Matarewha and Te Tākinga to lead an army against the Tūhourangi at Tumoana on Lake Rotoiti. At the battle of Harakekengunguru, they tricked the defenders into sallying forth, ambushed them, and captured Tumoana. They returned to Lake Rotoehu killed all of the prisoners except for one woman, Te Aoniwaho, who was married by a Ngāti Pikiao rangatira called Kotiora. He insulted Te Aoniwaho, so she helped her father's people to kill Kotiora. In revenge, Te Whakatane attacked Unaatekapua pā twice and killed the Tūhourangi chief Te Karerepounamu at Ngongoahi. The Tūhourangi chiefs Te Heroro and Te Herapunga responded by leading a war party from Te Weta towards Rotoehu. They attacked and killed three of Te Tākinga's sons at the Battle of Kotarahure.

Te Tākinga allied with Tutumanga of Waitaha and sacked the Tuhourangi pā at Te Weta, killing Te Heroro and Te Herapunga. They spared Pukurahi pā, Titaka, and Paehinahina, but captured Kakanui, Motuohiwa, Motutawa, Kopuakino, and Makamakahinaki, killing the rangatira Parapara, Te Taniwha, and Kauhaterangi. The surviving Tūhourangi gathered at Paeehinahina, Pukurahi, and Motutawa under Te Rangipuawhe. In Te Tākinga's old age, Tūhourangi had largely rebuilt their position around Lake Rotoiti, so he attacked Kotipu pā and massacred a group of Tuhourangi at Kohangakaeaea. Finally, Te Tākinga went on his own to Motutawa pā, the major remaining Tūhourangi stronghold on the lake. There he found Te Rangipuawhe, who conceded that he could not give recompense for the death of the sons and voluntarily led the remaining Tūhourangi away from Rotoiti to settle on Lake Tarawera and Lake Rotokakahi.

Four of Te Tākinga's sons came to Motutawa and divided the conquered land between themselves. Kiore received Mourea and Waikarangatia. Mangō and Manene got the land north of Ohau Stream. Te Awanui got the land between Pukurahi and Pukearuhe. They travelled north along the Kaituna River, surveying the area. At Turirau, the rangatira Te Huia gave Mangō a feast, but a disagreement took place, which culminated in the four brothers killing Te Huia and placing his head on a rewarewa stake. The place where this happened was named Te Upoko o Te Huia (the head of Te Huia) as a result. In a subsequent battle, they drove off some new settlers, led by Poia and Miromiro, from this area.

A final group of Tūhourangi were tricked by Te Rangiwawahia into leaving their pā at Ohoukaka and were massacred.

== Organisation ==
For the purposes of the Resource Management Act 1991, the iwi is represented by the Ngāti Pikiao Iwi Trust. This is a common law trust, with a board consisting of seven representatives elected by iwi members. As of 2023, the chair is Piki Thomas. The Trust delegates direct negotiation with local authorities on matters relating to the Resource Management Act to the Ngāti Pikiao Environmental Society, which is an incorporated society. As of 2025 its co-presidents are Arapeta Tahana and Piatariihi Bennett.

Under the Affiliate Te Arawa Iwi and Hapu Claims Settlement Act 2008, Ngāti Pikiao elects three of the fifteen trustees of the Te Pūmautanga o Te Arawa Trust, which represents Te Arawa interests arising from the Central North Island Forests Land Collective Settlement of 2008. It is among the iwi that elect the three Te Kawatapuārangi trustees of the Te Arawa Lakes Trust, which manages Te Arawa's interests over fourteen lakes in the Bay of Plenty arising from the Te Arawa Lakes Settlement Act 2006. It elects one of the eleven representatives on the board of Te Kotahitanga o Te Arawa Waka Fisheries Trust Board, which manages the iwi's interests in fisheries, under the Māori Fisheries Act 2004 and the Māori Commercial Aquaculture Claims Settlement Act 2004.

Te Rūnanga o Ngāti Pikiao, which was established in 1987, provides training, health, and social services for the iwi. It has its headquarters in Rotorua. As of 2025, it has twelve trustees, of whom the chairperson is Mapihi Raharūhi.

=== Hapū and marae ===
Within Ngāti Pikiao, there are nine hapū and eleven marae, each with their own wharenui (some of which are shared by several hapū).

Hapū	Marae	Wharenui
Ngāti Hinekura	Pounamunui	Houmaitawhiti
Ngāti Hinekura	Te Waiiti	Hinekura
Ngāti Hinerangi	Tāheke (Opatia)	Rangitihi
Ngāti Kahumatamomoe	Waiatuhi	Kahumatamomoe
Ngāti Kawiti	Tapuaeharuru	Uruika
Ngāti Paruaharanui	Taupari	Paruaharanui
Ngāti Paruaharanui	Waiatuhi, Mourea	Kahumatamomoe
Ngāti Pikiao	Te Awhe o te Rangi	Te Awhe o te Rangi
Ngāti Pikiao	Tokerau	Pikiao
Ngāti Tamateatutahi	Tapuaeharuru, Rotoiti	Uruika
Ngāti Te Rangiunuora	Punawhakareia	Uenuku mai Rarotonga
Ngāti Te Rangiunuora	Taurua	Te Rangiunuora
Ngāti Te Takinga	Te Takinga	Te Takinga
Ngāti Te Takinga	Waiatuhi	Kahumatamomoe

=== Communications ===
Te Arawa FM is the radio station of Te Arawa iwi, including Ngāti Pikiao, Tūhourangi and Ngāti Whakaue. It was established in the early 1980s and became a charitable entity in November 1990. The station underwent a major transformation in 1993, becoming Whanau FM. One of the station's frequencies was taken over by Mai FM in 1998; the other became Pumanawa FM before later reverting to Te Arawa FM. It is available on 89.0 FM in Rotorua.

== See also ==
- List of Māori iwi

== Bibliography ==
- Jones, Pei Te Hurinui; Biggs, Bruce (2004). Ngā iwi o Tainui : nga koorero tuku iho a nga tuupuna = The traditional history of the Tainui people. Auckland [N.Z.]: Auckland University Press. ISBN 1869403312.
- Stafford, Don (1967). Te Arawa: A history of the Arawa people. Wellington [N.Z.]: Reed. ISBN 9780947506100.
