= Ngāti Whakaue =

Māori iwi (tribe) in Aotearoa (New Zealand)

- Iwi (tribe) in Māoridom
- Rohe (region): Rotorua
- Waka (canoe): Te Arawa

Ngāti Whakaue is a Māori iwi, of the Te Arawa confederation of New Zealand, tracing its descent from Whakaue Kaipapa, son of Uenuku-kopakō, and grandson of Tūhourangi. The tribe lives in the Rotorua district and descends from the Arawa waka. The Ngāti Whakaue village Ōhinemutu is within the township of Rotorua. The Ngāti Whakaue chief Pūkākī is depicted on the New Zealand 20 cent coin.

The Ngāti Whakaue Education Trust Board administers grants to a range of education projects, and has been a source of funding for Rotorua Boys' High School, Rotorua Girls' High School, Rotorua Lakes High School and Western Heights High School since its establishment in 1881 under the Fenton Agreement. Revenues to the Trust derive primarily from commercial leases in the Rotorua CBD, which increased sharply upon the expiration of 99-year leases in 1980. In 2023, the Trust reported a net profit after tax of $9,004,155.

Te Arawa FM is the radio station of Te Arawa iwi, including Ngāti Whakaue, Ngāti Pikiao and Tūhourangi. It was established in the early 1980s and became a charitable entity in November 1990. The station underwent a major transformation in 1993, becoming Whanau FM. One of the station's frequencies was taken over by Mai FM in 1998; the other became Pumanawa FM before later reverting to Te Arawa FM. It is available on 89.0 FM in Rotorua.

== See also ==
- Te Papaiouru Marae
- Arawa (canoe)
