= Lake Rotoehu =

Lake in the North Island of New Zealand

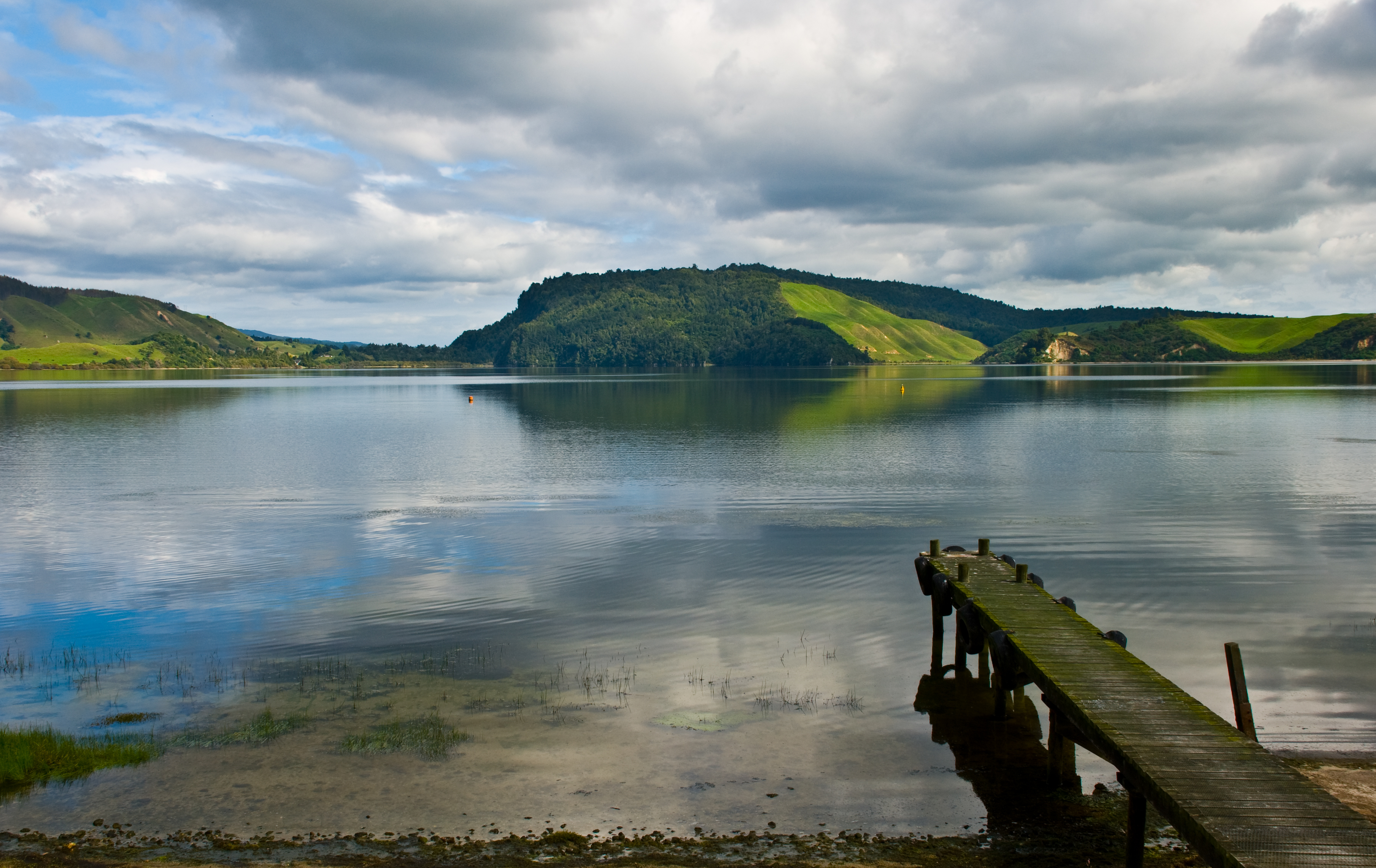
- Lake Rotoehu

- Location within North Island
- Interactive map of Lake Rotoehu
- Location: North Island
- Coordinates: 38°1′S 176°32′E
- Type: crater lake
- Primary outflows: sink hole in the northern arm
- Basin countries: New Zealand
- Max. length: 4.6 km (2.9 mi)
- Max. width: 4.0 km (2.5 mi)
- Surface area: 8.1 km^{2} (3.1 sq mi)
- Average depth: 8.3 m (27 ft)
- Max. depth: 13.5 m (44 ft)
- Surface elevation: 295 m (968 ft)
- Islands: nil
- Settlements: Otautu Bay and Kennedy Bay- Rotorua 30km away

Lake Rotoehu is the smallest in a chain of three lakes to the northeast of Lake Rotorua in New Zealand's North Island. It is located between the city of Rotorua and town of Whakatāne. The southern end of the lake occupies part of the Okataina caldera. It is fed (underground seepage) by Lake Rotomā to the east, and flows westward joining Lake Rotoiti. The lake is one of the least visited, but offers great Kayaking and fishing (rainbow trout). It has two access points, Otautu Bay and Kennedy Bay and is well located centrally to many other places e.g. the ocean, mountain biking, hiking etc. It has very good wildlife and birdlife with several rarely seen birds. In particular the endangered kōkako is located close by.

The New Zealand Ministry for Culture and Heritage gives a translation of "turbid lake" for Rotoehu.
