= Te Arawa =

Confederation of Māori iwi and hapū (tribes and sub-tribes)

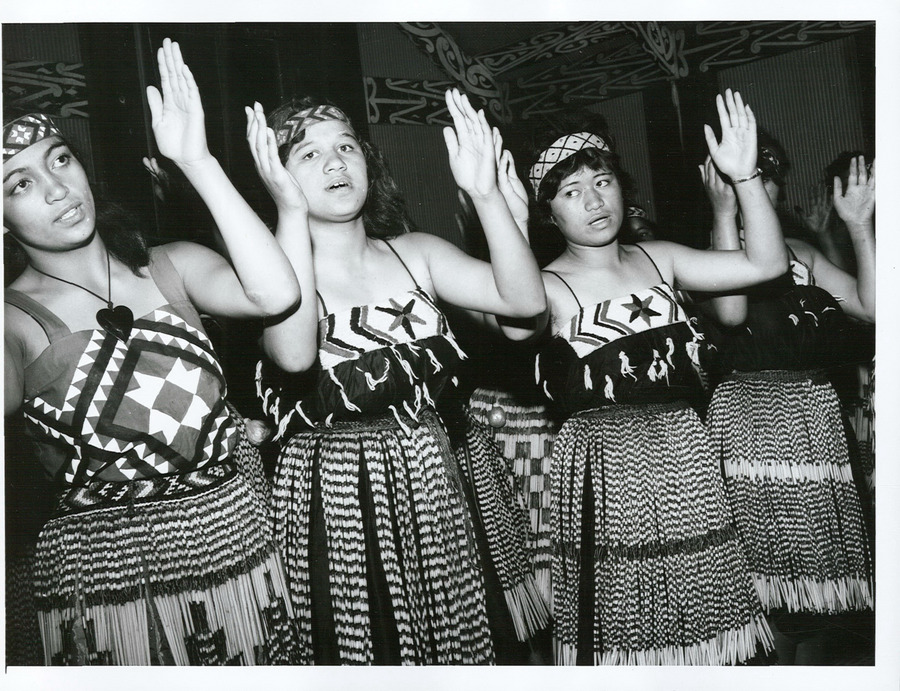
The Te Arawa of Maketu entertain guests.

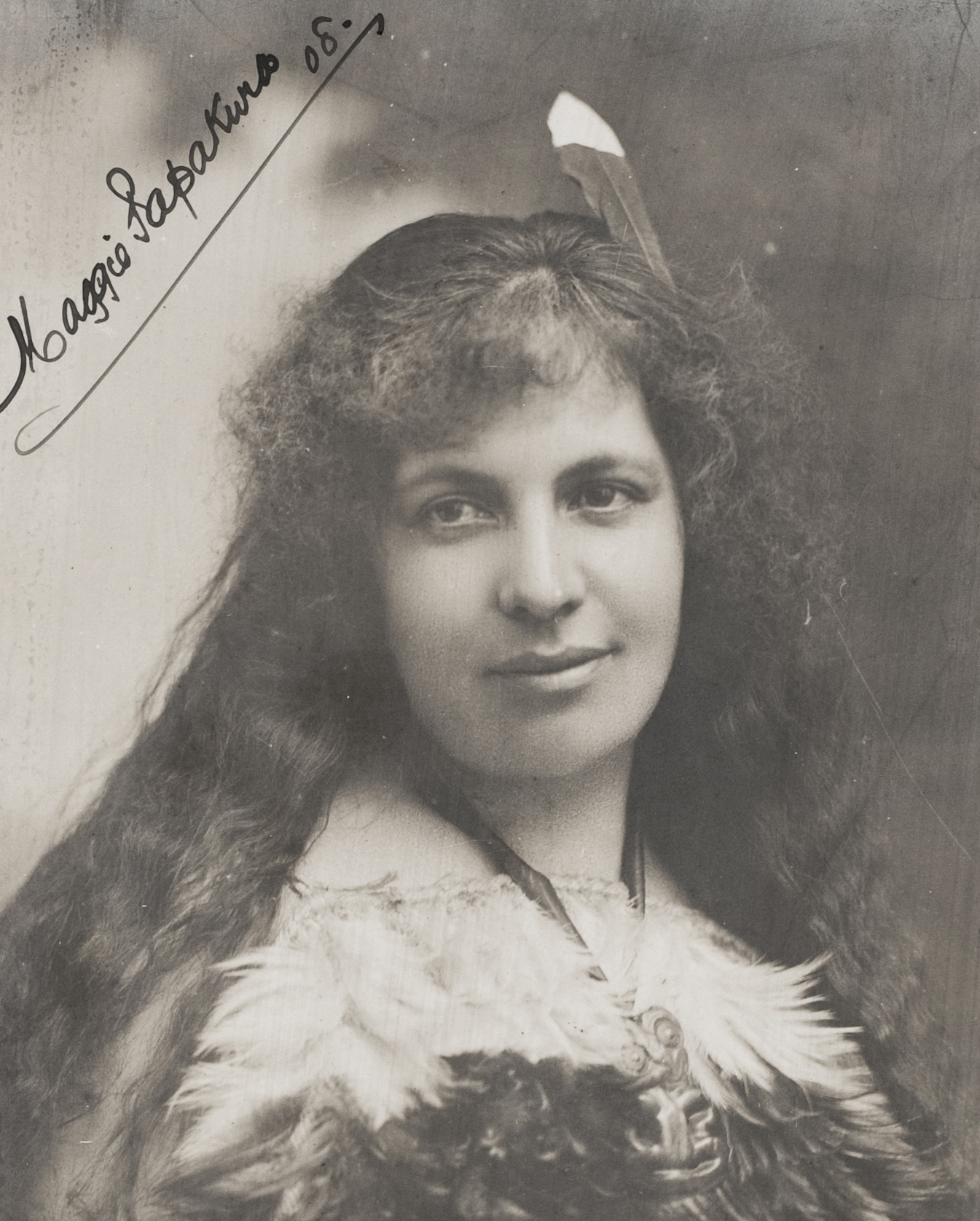
Maggie Papakura (1873–1930) was a guide, entertainer and ethnographer. Her mother was of the Ngāti Wāhiao hapu of the Tūhourangi tribe of Te Arawa and her father was from England.

Te Arawa is a confederation of Māori iwi and hapū (tribes and sub-tribes) of New Zealand who trace their ancestry to the Arawa migration canoe (waka). The tribes are based in the Rotorua and Bay of Plenty areas and have a population of around 60,117 according to the 2018 census, making the confederation the sixth biggest iwi in New Zealand. The Te Arawa iwi comprises 56 hapū (sub-tribes) and 31 marae (family groupings).

== History ==
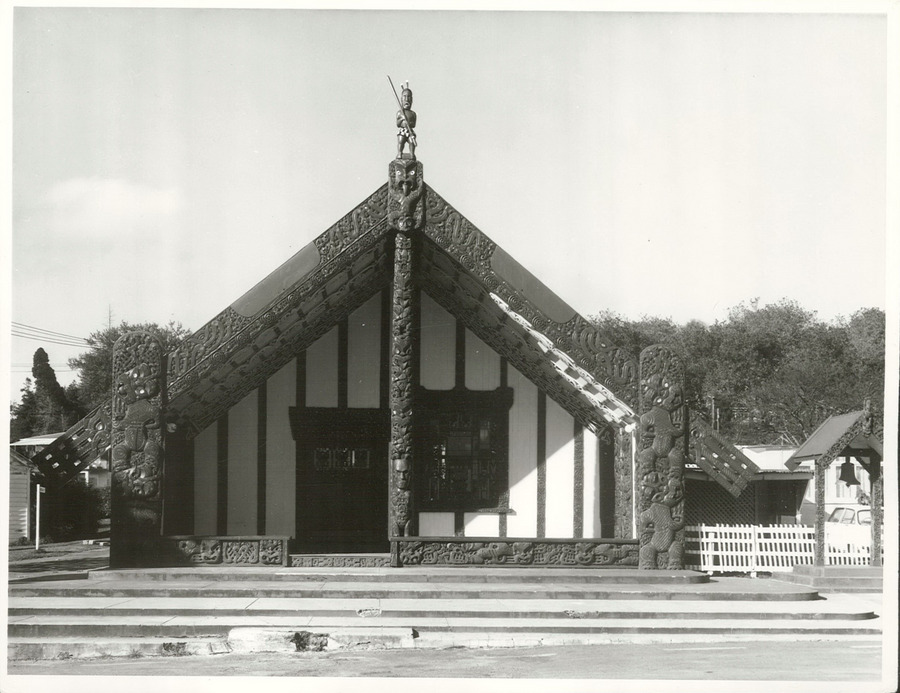
Te Papaiouru marae at Ohinemutu, Rotorua, in 1975. It is the home marae of the Ngāti Whakaue subtribes Ngāti Tae-o-Tū and Ngāti Tūnohopū.

Te Arawa iwi are descended from people who migrated to New Zealand on the Arawa canoe. They settled in the Bay of Plenty region, principally around the Rotorua lakes. Three main subtribes developed: Ngāti Pikiao occupied the eastern end of Lake Rotoiti and the area around Lake Rotoehu and Lake Rotomā; Tūhourangi occupied the upper Kaituna River, western Lake Rotoiti and the south-east side of Lake Rotorua including Ōhinemutu; Ngāti Whakaue, formerly known as Te Uri o Uenukukōpako, occupied Mokoia Island and the north-west side of Lake Rotorua.

Many Te Arawa men fought for the colonial government in the New Zealand Wars that took place in the North Island in the mid-19th century. Perhaps in part, for this reason, the iwi chose to negotiate directly with the New Zealand Government over their historical grievances, bypassing the Waitangi Tribunal. A series of negotiations has resulted in several settlements of their various claims, the largest of which involve the settlement relating to the 14 lakes, signed in December 2004, and the settlement for all the historical claims of a cluster of Te Arawa iwi and hapu signed on 30 September 2006. The Government apologised to Te Arawa for breaches of the Treaty and paid $36 million in compensation, including up to 500 km² of Crown forest land, as well as 19 areas of special significance, including the Whakarewarewa Thermal Springs Reserve.

On 18 December 2015 Te Arawa gained the right to vote in committee meetings of the Rotorua Lakes Council via an iwi partnership board, Te Tatau o Te Arawa.

Te Arawa FM is the radio station of Te Arawa iwi, including Ngāti Pikiao, Tūhourangi and Ngāti Whakaue. It was established in the early 1980s and became a charitable entity in November 1990. The station underwent a major transformation in 1993, becoming Whanau FM. One of the station's frequencies 99.1 was taken over by Mai FM in 1998; the other became Pumanawa 89FM before later reverting to Te Arawa FM. It is available on 88.7 FM in Rotorua the 99.1 frequency is now broadcasting commercial station The Heat 991 FM which started broadcasting 15 April 2015.

== Constituent iwi and hapu ==
The iwi and hapu that constitute Te Arawa include:

Ngāti Whakaue, Ngāti Rangiteaorere, Ngāti Pikiao, Ngāti Mākino, Ngāti Rangitihi, Ngāti Rangiwewehi, Tapuika, Waitaha, Ngāti Ngararanui, Ngāti Rongomai, Ngāti Tahu – Ngāti Whaoa, Ngāti Tarāwhai, Ngāti Te Roro o Te Rangi, Ngāti Kea Ngāti Tuara, Ngāti Tura-Ngāti Te Ngakau, Ngāti Uenukukōpako, Tūhourangi, Ngāti Hei, Ngāti Huarere and Ngāti Wāhiao.

== Notable people ==
- Manu Bennett, Actor
- Michael Bennett, Writer and film director
- Tāmati Coffey, Presenter and former MP
- Cliff Curtis, Actor
- Kepa Ehau, Māori leader and nationally acclaimed orator
- Te Ururoa Flavell, Former minister and co-leader of TPM
- Gillies Kaka, Olympian and NZ rugby union player
- Troy Kingi, Artist
- Sir Howard Morrison, Entertainer
- Scotty Morrison, Writer and broadcaster
- Stacey Morrison, TV host and MC
- Temuera Morrison, Actor
- Mākereti Papakura, Tourist guide and ethnographer
- TJ Perenara, NZ rugby union player
- Maisey Rika, Artist
- Mita Taupopoki, Māori leader and orator
