= Tūhourangi =

Māori iwi (tribe) in Aotearoa New Zealand

- Iwi (tribe) in Māoridom
- Rohe (region): Rotorua District
- Waka (canoe): Te Arawa
- Population: 2,874
- Website: www.tuhourangi.iwi.nz

Tūhourangi is a Māori iwi of New Zealand with a rohe centered on Lake Tarawera, Lake Rotomahana, Lake Okaro, Lake Okareka, Lake Rotokākahi, Lake Tikitapu and the area south of Lake Rotorua. It is part of the Te Arawa tribal confederation.

== History ==
Tūhourangi claim descent from Tūhourangi, a son of Rangitihi and Papawharanui, who settled at Ohoukaka on Lake Rotoiti, and had two sons, Uenukukōpako and Taketakehikuroa. Uenukukōpako and Taketakehikuroa conquered Mokoia island under the leadership of their cousin Rangiteaorere. Afterwards, they settled on the island, but quarrelled over a hot spring. Uenukukopako stayed on the island and his descendants became the separate iwi of Te Uri o Uenukukōpako. Taketakehikuroa left Mokoia and resettled at Ohoukaka. Taketakehikuroa's sons Tuteamutu and Te Wiwiniorongo quarrelled, so he split his lands between them, giving Paengaroa to Tuteamutu and Ohoukaka to Te Wiwiniorongo. Tuteamutu's granddaughter was Hinemoa, who famously swam across Rotorua to meet her lover Tūtānekai.

Tūtānekai entered into a conflict with Ngāti Pikiao, which saw Umukaria killed. Wāhiao, founder of the Tūhourangi hapū of Ngāti Wāhiao joined Tūtānekai in an expedition of vengeance against Ngāti Pikiao. Afterwards, Wāhiao settled at Pukeroa. Later the Tūhourangi killed Tūtānekai's son, so he teamed up with Ngāti Pikiao, who attacked and defeated Tūhourangi at the Battle of Harakekengunguru. Tūtānekai's son committed adultery with Wāhiao's wife, so he allied with Te Apiti, founder of the Tūhourangi hapū of Ngāti Te Apiti, who was victorious at Rotokawa, but in the aftermath Wāhiao was assassinated. Tūhourangi joined up with Ngāti Awa and Ngāti Tama to seek revenge.

== Organisation ==
The Tūhourangi Tribal Authority, which was established in 2006, receives and manages all assets and profits from the Te Arawa treaty settlement. It also represents the iwi for the purposes of the Resource Management Act 1991. This is a common law trust with a board consisting of five trustees elected by registered members of the iwi. As of 2025, the Chair is Kirikowhai Mikaere and the Pouwhakahaere (CEO) is Ngarepo Eparaima.

Under the Affiliate Te Arawa Iwi and Hapu Claims Settlement Act 2008, Tūhourangi elects three of the fifteen trustees of the Te Pūmautanga o Te Arawa Trust, which represents Te Arawa interests arising from the Central North Island Forests Land Collective Settlement of 2008 and the Affiliate Te Arawa Iwi and Hapu Claims Settlement Act 2008. It is among the iwi that elect the three Tūhourangi trustees of the Te Arawa Lakes Trust, which manages Te Arawa's interests over fourteen lakes in the Bay of Plenty arising from the Te Arawa Lakes Settlement Act 2006. It elects two of the six representatives on the board of the Te Arawa River Iwi Trust which co-manages the restoration of the health of the section of the Waikato River between Huka Falls and Pohaturoa under the Ngāti Tūwharetoa, Raukawa and Te Arawa River Iwi Waikato River Act 2010. It elects one of the eleven representatives on the board of Te Kotahitanga o Te Arawa Waka Fisheries Trust Board, which manages the iwi's interests in fisheries, under the Māori Fisheries Act 2004 and the Māori Commercial Aquaculture Claims Settlement Act 2004.

=== Hapū and marae ===
Marae of Tūhourangi.
1 Hurungaterangi (Ngāpuna)
2 Moerangi
3 Te Pākira
4 Te Paparere-a-Rātōrua
5 Tūhourangi

There are fourteen hapū within Tūhourangi:

- Ngāti Apumoana
- Ngāti Hinemihi
- Ngāti Hinganoa
- Ngāti Huarere
- Ngāti Kahu Upoko
- Ngāti Puta
- Ngāti Taoi
- Ngāti Te Apiti
- Ngāti Tionga
- Ngāti Tukiterangi
- Ngāti Tumatawera
- Ngāti Tuohonoa
- Ngāti Uruhina
- Ngāti Wahiao

The hapū of Ōtūkawa has whakapapa links with Tūhourangi, but for treaty settlement purposes is part of Tapuika.

The iwi is affiliated with five marae (some of which are shared with other iwi):

Marae	Wharenui	Affiliated hapū	Address
Hurungaterangi (Ngāpuna)	Hurungaterangi	Hurunga Te Rangi, Ngāti Kahupoko	11-17 Hurunga Avenue, Ngāpuna
Moerangi	Apumoana o te Ao Kohatu	Hurunga Te Rangi, Ngāti Apumoana, Ngāti Kahupoko, Ngāti Taeotu, Ngāti Tumatawera	27 Tarawera Road, Lynmore
Te Pākira	Wahiao	Ngāti Puta, Ngāti Taoi, Ngāti Uruhina, Ngāti Wahiao, Tūhourangi	2 Hinganoa Drive, Whakarewarewa
Te Paparere-a-Rātōrua	Hinemihi	Ngāti Hinemihi, Ngāti Tarawhai, Ngāti Tuohonoa	23 Hona Road, Ngāpuna
Tūhourangi	Tūhourangi	Tūhourangi	Rangiuru, on the Kaituna River near Te Puke

=== Communications ===
Te Arawa FM is the radio station of Te Arawa iwi, including Tūhourangi, Ngāti Pikiao and Ngāti Whakaue. It was established in the early 1980s and became a charitable entity in November 1990. The station underwent a major transformation in 1993, becoming Whanau FM. One of the station's frequencies was taken over by Mai FM in 1998; the other became Pumanawa FM before later reverting to Te Arawa FM. It is available on 89.0 FM in Rotorua.

== See also ==
- List of Māori iwi
