= Wāhiao =

Wāhiao was a Māori rangatira (chief) of the Tūhourangi iwi in the Te Arawa confederation and the founding ancestor of the Ngāti Wāhiao hapū. During his life, he led part of a war party in an attack on Ngāti Pikiao in revenge for the murder of his father and he recruited a war party to attack Ngāti Whakaue at Mokoia after their leading chief committed adultery with his wife. This war party was successful, but Ngāti Whakaue responded by assassinating Wāhiao and seizing his lands.

== Life ==
Wāhiao's father was Umukaria and his mother was Hinemaru. Through his father, he was a great-granddaughter of Taketakehikuroa and Uenukukōpako, the two sons of Tuhourangi, and thus a descendant of Tama-te-kapua, the captain of the Arawa. He had one brother, Te Koropunia, and one sister, Hinemoa, who would famously swim across Lake Rotorua to join her lover Tūtānekai.

=== Conflict with Ngāti Pikiao ===
Tūtānekai killed Morewhati and Tamakari, sons of Pikiao, so Ngāti Pikiao ambushed his people and killed Umukaria. Tūtānekai therefore led a war party to attack Moura, a pā belonging to Ngāti Pikiao on the shore of Lake Tarawera. He was joined in this expedition by Wāhiao, as well as Wharetokotoko of Ngāti Tama from Papohatu. This party went to Rotokakahi and killed the Ngāti Tuteata people whom they found there, including the chief Te Inanga. They carried on to Te Tawaroa (modern Kariri) on the shore of Lake Tarawera, where they found Umukaria's head abandoned in a cave, which they named Te Rua o Umukaria (Umukaria's cave). They found Ohorongo pā abandoned also.

Finally, the war party reached Moura. Late in the afternoon, they attacked the Moura and killed many people, including the chiefs Mokaikitariki, Tunoke, and Tutoa. Pikiao and his followers were not at Moura when it was taken, but at Te Puwha on the eastern side of Taraera. After the attack they moved to Matata, then to Otamarakau and Pukehina, before being invited to Te Puia on Rotoehu by Pikiao's friend Matarewha. Wāhiao settled at Pukeroa.

=== Conflict with Ngāti Whakaue ===
Tūtānekai's son, Whatumairangi committed adultery with Wāhiao's wife, Uruhina. Wāhiao desired revenge but could not attack Whatumairangi directly, because he was his uncle. Therefore he went on a journey to recruit allies to help him. First he met with Tarāwhai and his son Te Rangitakaroro of Ngāti Tarāwhai at Lake Okataina. Then he went to Te Apiti of Ngāti Apumoana at Makatiti on Lake Tarawera, who had been involved in the murder of Umukaria. They made peace, sealed with a marriage alliance between Wāhiao's son and Te Apiti's daughter, and Te Apiti agreed to help Wāhiao get his revenge. Wāhiao now made his base at Te Uenga on the northeasterns hore of Lake Rotorua. Meanwhile Te Apiti led a war party to Okataina and from there to the Whakapoungakau hills, southeast of Rotorua. Whatumairangi led out a force and attacked the Ngāti Apumoana force at Rotokawa. He was killed in the ensuing battle.

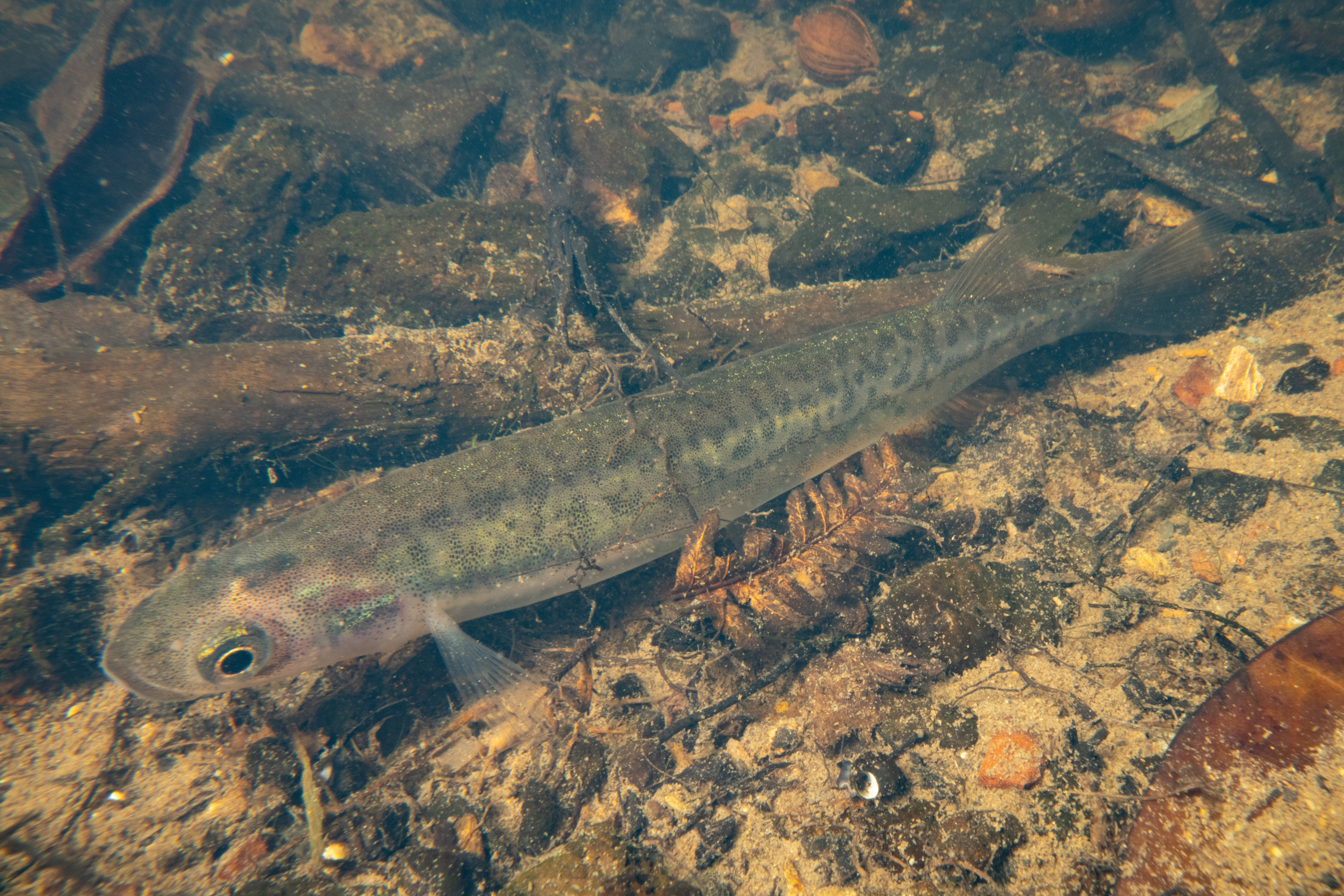
Īnanga

The people on Mokoia island now wished to get revenge on Wāhiao for his role in the death of Whatumairangi. They sent Hinemoa to Te Uenga to make a peace agreement with Wāhiao and he received her positively. The following night, the people led a fleet of canoes out from Mokoia to the Ohau channel. Three of the men - Kiritako of Ngati Rangiteaorere, Te Hurunga of Ngati Whakaue, and Tukarewa of Ngati Rangiwewehi - hid inside a hut where Wāhiao kept his fishing nets. When Wāhiao came down to the hut the next morning to collect his nets, planning to catch some īnanga for a feast to celebrate the peace agreement, the three men ambushed and murdered him. Meanwhile, the rest of the war party attacked Te Uenga and captured it, as well as four other nearby settlements: Taupiri, Te Waerenga, Ngaukawakawa, and Te Reoreo.

A chief called Taiwhakaea led a war party of Ngāti Awa from Whakatane to get revenge for Wāhiao's death, but Kaiure and the people of Mokoia ambushed and defeated him in the Battle of Moanawaipu. Tuhourangi, Ngāti Awa, and Ngāti Tama made successful attacks on Ngāti Whakaue and Te Uri o Uenukukōpako in revenge.

== Family ==
Wāhiao married Uruhina, with whom he had children:

- Taupopoki

- Huarere, who married his cousin Hinekai:

- Tahuriwakanui

- Anumātao, who married Tawari

- Ngāpuia, who married Pūkakī
- Amooterangi

- Te Ruaotetaniwha

- Patatia

- Whaeateao

- Hinerauhuia

He also married Hinekete, with whom he had:

- Tukiterangi, who married Pareheru or Whareheru, daughter of Te Apiti

- Tuahonoa
- Mahuika

== Bibliography ==
- Stafford, D.M. (1967). Te Arawa: A History of the Arawa People. Rotorua, New Zealand: A.H. & A.W. Reed.
- Steedman, J.A.W. (1984). Ngā Ohaaki o ngā Whānau o Tauranga Moana: Māori History and Genealogy of the Bay of Plenty.
