= Te Whanapokia =

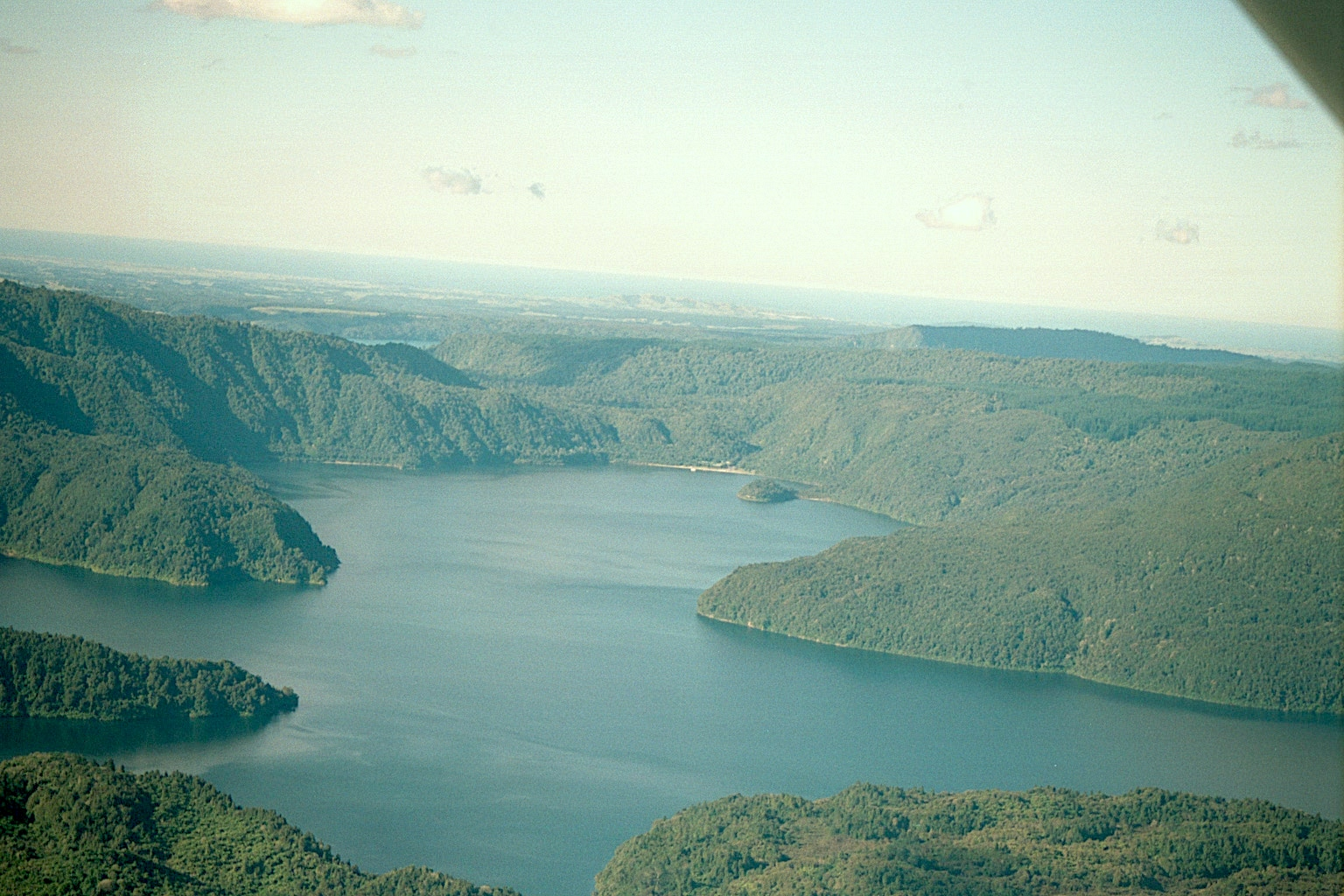
View of Lake Ōkataina.

Te Whanapokia was a Māori rangatira (chief) of the iwi Ngāti Kahuūpoko of the Te Arawa confederation of tribes, based at Lake Ōkataina in the Bay of Plenty region of New Zealand. His gift of land and fishing grounds to the chief Tarāwhai of Ngāti Tarāwhai led to a conflict which resulted in Ngāti Kahuūpoko being expelled from the region.

== Life ==
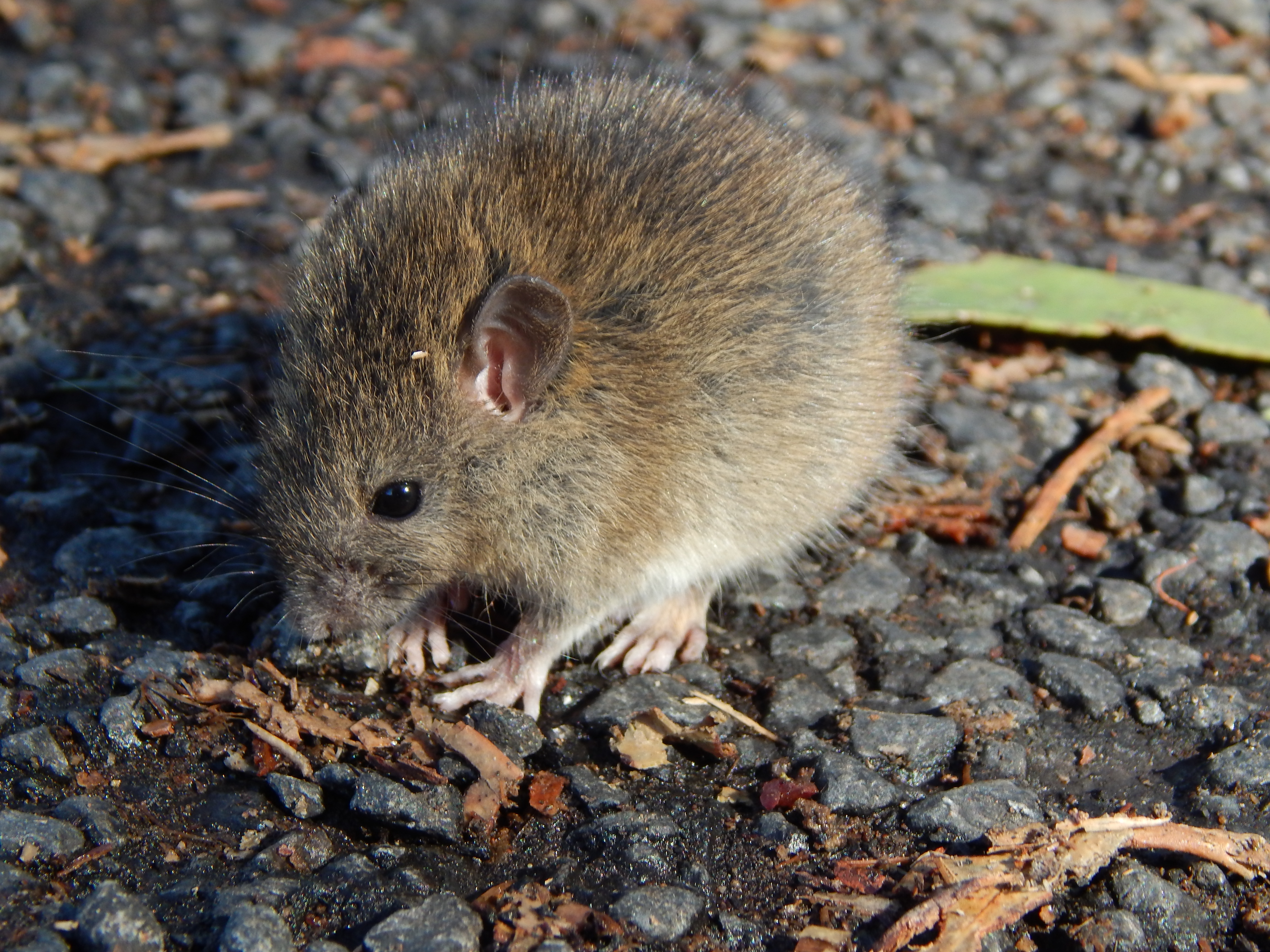
Kiore (Polynesian rat).

Te Whanapokia and his brother Orunui belonged to Ngāti Kahuūpoko, who were based on Lake Ōkataina and descended from Rangitihi, founder of Ngāti Rangitihi. According to Donald Stafford, they were the sons of a chief called Titi, but according to Neich their father was Kahuūpoko, namesake of the tribe, in which case they were direct descendants of Rangitihi.

While Te Whanapokia was away from his home at Okataina, hunting kiore rats, his fellow tribesmen killed a member of Ngāti Rongomai, who at this point lived at Whakairingatoto on Lake Rotoiti. Fearing retribution, Ngāti Kahu Upoko decided to make a pre-emptive attack on Ngāti Rongomai. But Ngāti Rongomai attacked their war party and defeated them in the Battle of Ngaupaiaka at Tawitinui near Lake Rotoatua and in the Battle of Tuarauiuia at Tauranganui beach on Lake Ōkataina. Titi was the commander at Tuarauiuia. As a result of this conflict, Ngāti Kahu Upoko were restricted to the northern and western coasts of Okataina. The rest of the lake came under the control of their cousin Tarawhai, founder of Ngāti Tarāwhai.

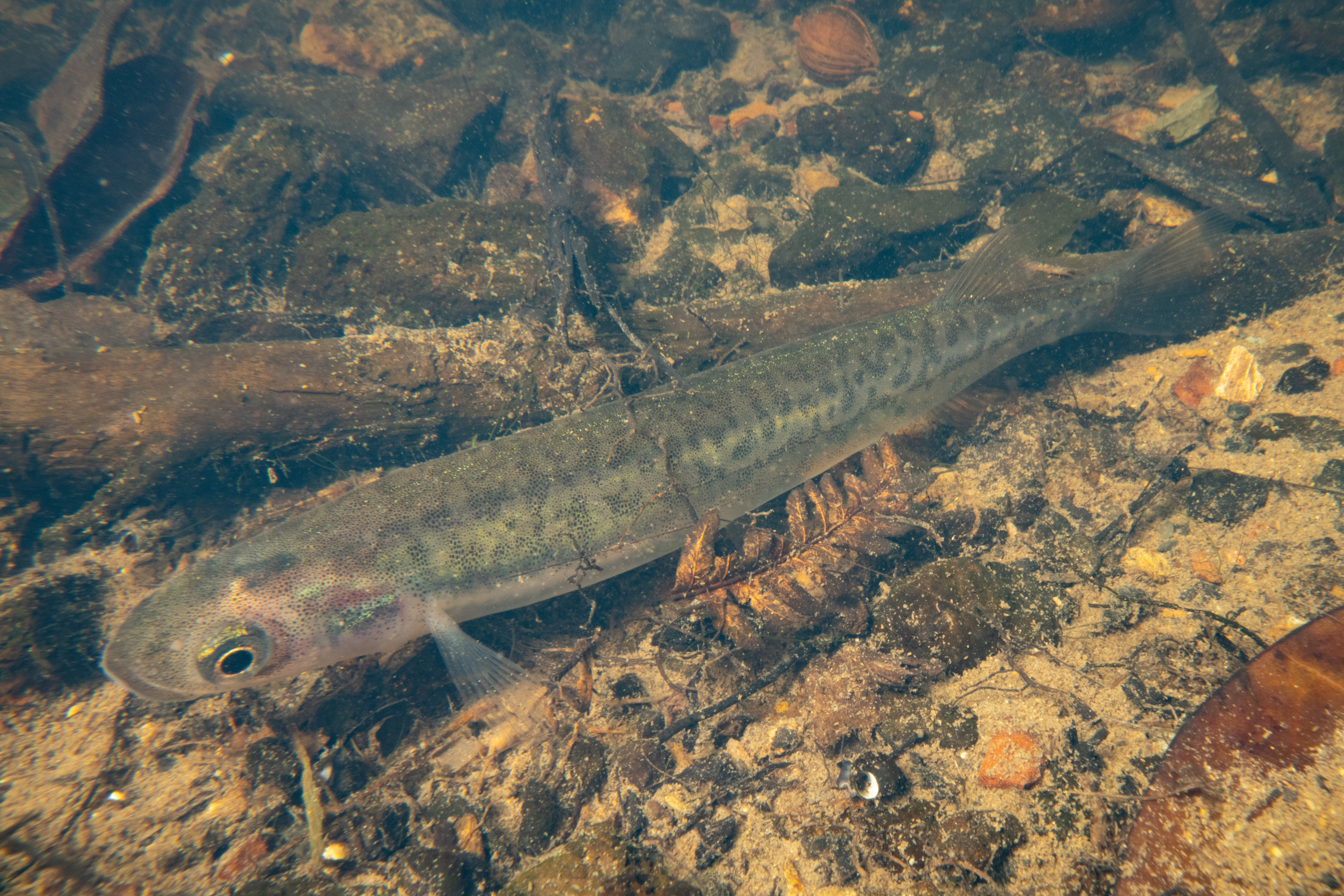
īnanga (whitebait).

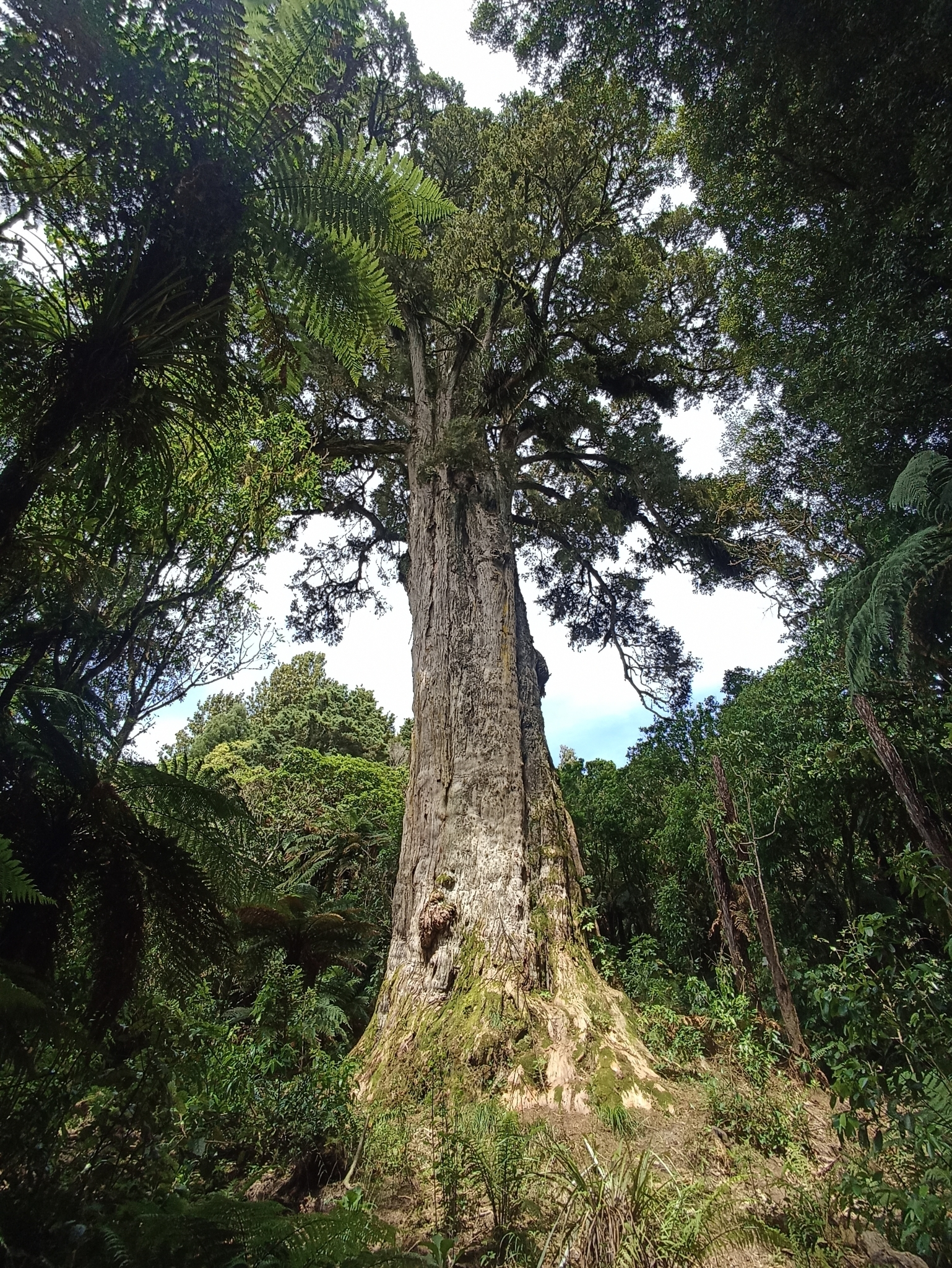
A tōtara tree.

When Te Whanapokia returned, he found that his house had been burnt down, so he complained to Tarawhai, who gave him six mats made from Kurī dog skins, six mats made from flax, and two greenstone mere. Te Whanapokia promised to visit relatives on the Bay of Plenty coast at Pukehina and Maketu and bring back gifts for Tarawhai in return. But Te Whanapokia's relatives did not give him anything, so when he returned and Tarawhai came to visit him at Te Koutu pā, Te Whanapokia decided to give him a piece of land on the lakeshore and a rock in the lake where īnanga (whitebait) could be caught. Tarawhai was pleased with these gifts and reciprocated by giving Te Whanapokia a tōtara tree.

Other people in Ngāti Kahuūpoko were very angry that Te Whanapokia had given away their land and fishing ground, so when Tarawhai went fishing there, one of the chiefs, Te Rangipaikura, attacked Tarawhai. Te Rangipaikura was killed, but so was Tarawhai's son Te Rangihaemata. Tarawhai therefore gathered a war party at Oruaroa, which set out to attack Ngāti Kahuūpoko. They first attacked Tahuunaapo pā, where they had a difficult battle, in which the chiefs Te Kaioro, Te Whakahoro, and Kauhau were killed, but in the end they captured the place. At this point, they were joined by a second Ngāti Rongomai war party, which had come down from Rotoiti. Ngāti Kahuūpoko fled to the Otutepo and Harangia caves, but the war party from Rotoiti found them and defeated them.

Te Whanapokia sued for peace. Hineheru and Rangipare, as representatives of the Ngāti Rongomai of Rotoiti, met with him at Te Koutu and agreed to peace. But Tarawhai refused to make peace until all of his enemies had left Ōkataina. Titi refused this and led out a war party against Tarawhai, but he was defeated and killed at Tauranganui. Te Whanapokia again sued for peace, along with his brother Oronui, and Tarawhai agreed. Oronui left the region and the remaining Ngāti Kahuūpoko settlements around the lake were taken over by Tarawhai.

== Legacy ==
Te Whanapokia's gift was cited by Ānaha Te Rāhui in the Maori Land Court in 1885 as the basis of Ngāti Tarawhai's ownership of the northern shore of Lake Ōkataina.

== Bibliography ==
- Stafford, D.M. (1967). Te Arawa: A History of the Arawa People. Rotorua, New Zealand: A.H. & A.W. Reed.
- Neich, Roger (2001). Carved histories: Rotorua ngati tarawhai woodcarving. Auckland, N.Z: Auckland University Press. ISBN 9781869402570.
