= Tene Waitere =

Ngati Tarawhai carver (1853–1931)

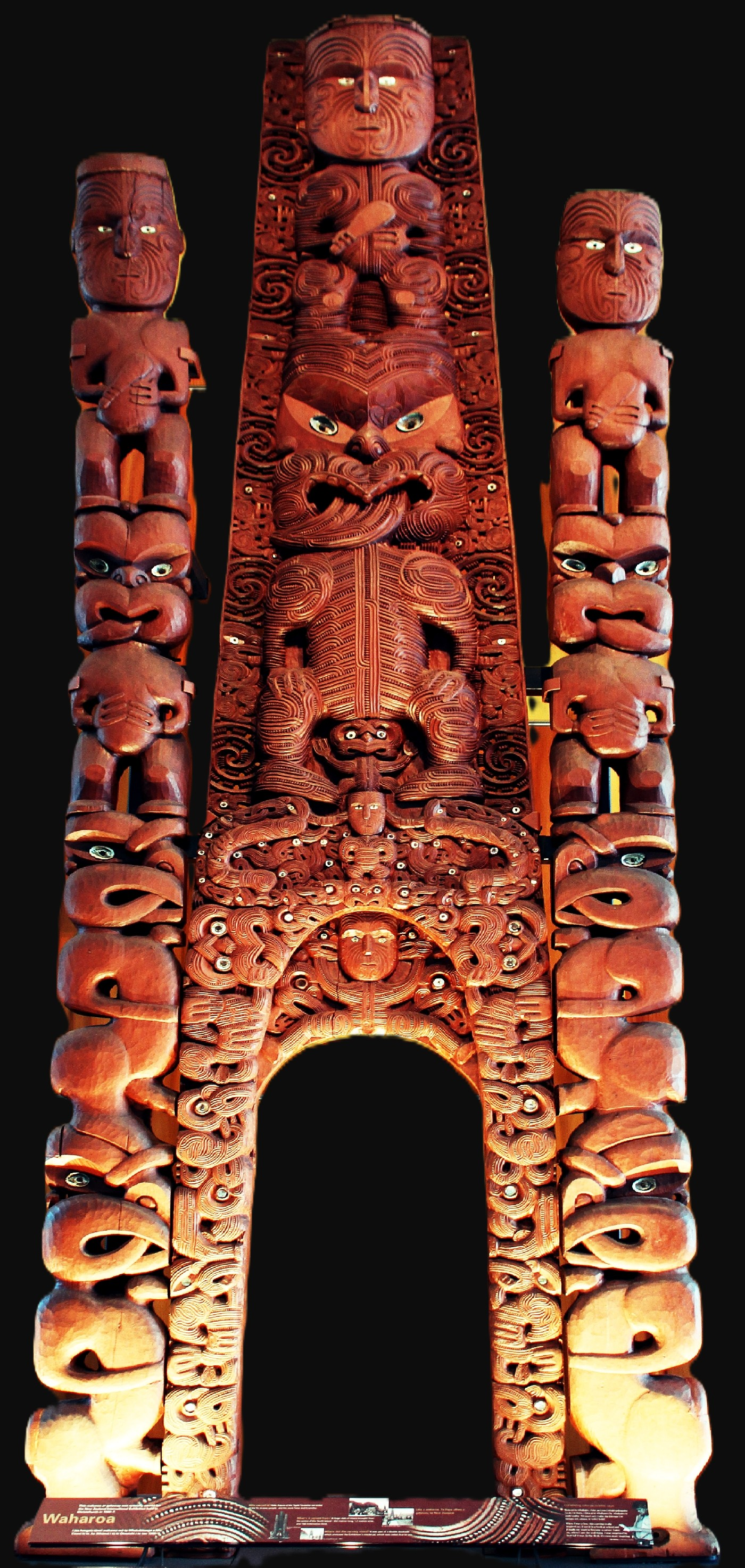
Waharoa by Neke Kapua and his two sons, Tene Kapua and Eramiha Kapua, (1906) in museum Te Papa Tongarewa

Tene Waitere (c. 1853–1931) was a New Zealand Māori carver from the Rotorua district. He identified with the Ngāti Tarāwhai and Te Arawa iwi. His mother was Ani Pape, the daughter of Te Rāhui, a Ngāti Tarāwhai leader. As a young girl, she was captured by Ngāpuhi during an attack on Rotorua in 1823 and taken as a slave to Northland, where she was forced to marry a Waitere. Tene Waitere was born probably in 1853 or 1854 at Mangamuka. When Tene was a few years old an uncle brought him, his elder sister Mereana Waitere and their mother to Ruatō, on Lake Rotoiti. There he was trained as a carver by Wero Tāroi and Ānaha Te Rāhui. He married Ruihi Te Ngahue of Tūhourangi and they had one child, a daughter Tuhipō. One of Tuhipō's children was Rangitiaria Dennan, better known as Guide Rangi. Eramiha Neke Kapua, another carver, was Waitere's nephew, son of his sister Mereana. Some of Waitere's carvings included Tiki-a-Tamamutu, Hinemihi, the Kearoa whakawae (door jam) and Rauru, and in the 1900s worked on the Whakarewarewa model village near Rotorua.
