= Tarāwhai =

Places in the life of Tarāwhai.
1 Tauranganui
2 Oruaroa
3 Te Kouto pā
4 Tahuunaapo
5 Ruato
6 Whekau

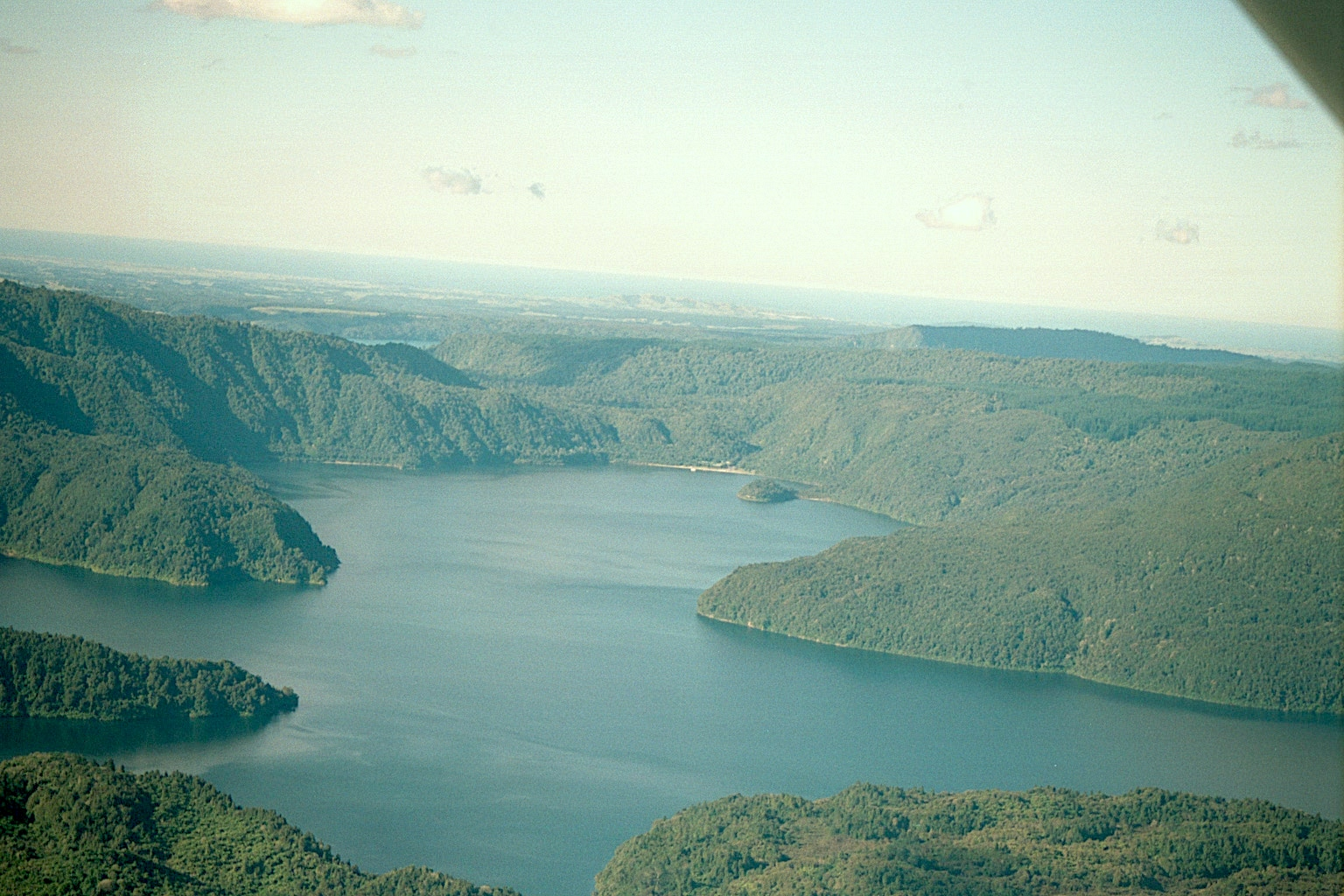
View of Lake Ōkataina.

Tarāwhai was a Māori rangatira (chief) of the Te Arawa confederation of tribes in the Bay of Plenty region of New Zealand. He was the founding ancestor of the Ngāti Tarāwhai iwi and conquered Lake Ōkataina for them from Ngāti Kahuūpoko. Later, he was involved in a conflict with Ngāti Te Takinga, which ended in them being allowed to settle at Ruato on the south shore of Lake Rotoiti.

== Life ==
Tarāwhai's father was Tūmakoha, through whom he was a direct descendant of Ngātoro-i-rangi, the tohunga of the Arawa. His mother was Te Rangika Wekura.

=== Conquest of Ōkataina ===
The people of Ngāti Kahuūpoko killed a member of Ngāti Rongomai, who at this point lived at Whakairingatoto on Lake Rotoiti. Fearing retribution, Ngāti Kahuūpoko decided to make a pre-emptive attack on Ngāti Rongomai. But Ngāti Rongomai attacked their war party and defeated them in the Battle of Ngaupaiaka at Tawitinui near Lake Rotoatua and in the Battle of Tuarauiuia at Tauranganui beach on Lake Ōkataina. As a result of this conflict, Ngāti Kahu Upoko were restricted to the northern and western coasts of Okataina. The rest of the lake came under Tarāwhai's control and he made his base at Oruaroa, at the southeastern end of the lake.

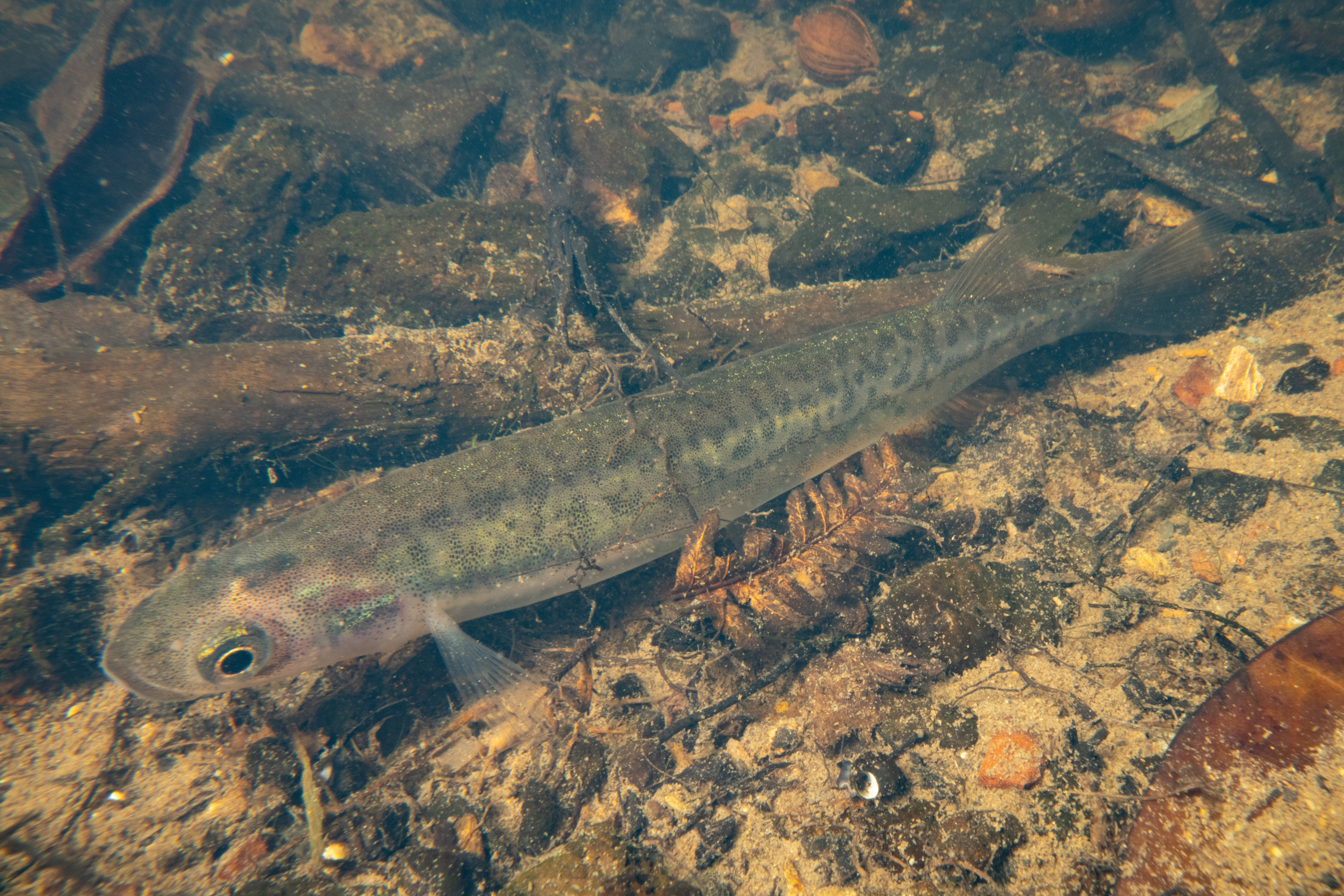
īnanga (whitebait).

One of the chiefs of Ngāti Kahuūpoko, Te Whanapokia, had been absent during these events. When he returned, he found that his house had been burnt down, so he complained to Tarāwhai, who gave him six mats made from Kurī dog skins, six mats made from flax, and two greenstone mere. In return, when Tarāwhai came to visit him at Te Koutu pā, Te Whanapokia decided to give him a piece of land on the lakeshore and a rock in the lake where īnanga (whitebait) could be caught. Tarāwhai was pleased with these gifts and reciprocated by giving Te Whanapokia a tōtara tree.

Other people in Ngāti Kahuūpoko were very angry that Te Whanapokia had given away their land and fishing ground, so when Tarāwhai went fishing there, one of the chiefs, Te Rangipaikura, attacked Tarāwhai. Te Rangipaikura was killed, but so was Tarāwhai's son Te Rangihaemata. Tarāwhai therefore gathered a war party at Oruaroa, which set out to attack Ngāti Kahuūpoko. They first attacked Tahuunaapo pā, which had been Te Rangipaikura's home. They had a difficult battle, but in the end they captured the place and killed chiefs Te Kaioro, Te Whakahoro, and Kauhau. At this point, they were joined by a second Ngāti Rongomai war party, which had come down from Rotoiti to join in avenging Te Rangihaemata. Ngāti Kahuūpoko fled to the Otutepo and Harangia caves, but the war party from Rotoiti found them and defeated them.

Te Whanapokia sued for peace. The Ngāti Rongomai war party from Rotoiti accepted this, but Tarawhai refused to make peace until all of his enemies had left Ōkataina. Te Whanapokia's father, Titi, refused this and led out a war party against Tarāwhai, but he was defeated and killed at Tauranganui. Te Whanapokia again sued for peace, along with his brother Oronui, and Tarāwhai agreed. Oronui left the region and the remaining Ngāti Kahuūpoko settlements around the lake were taken over by Tarāwhai.

=== Conflict with Ngāti Te Takinga ===
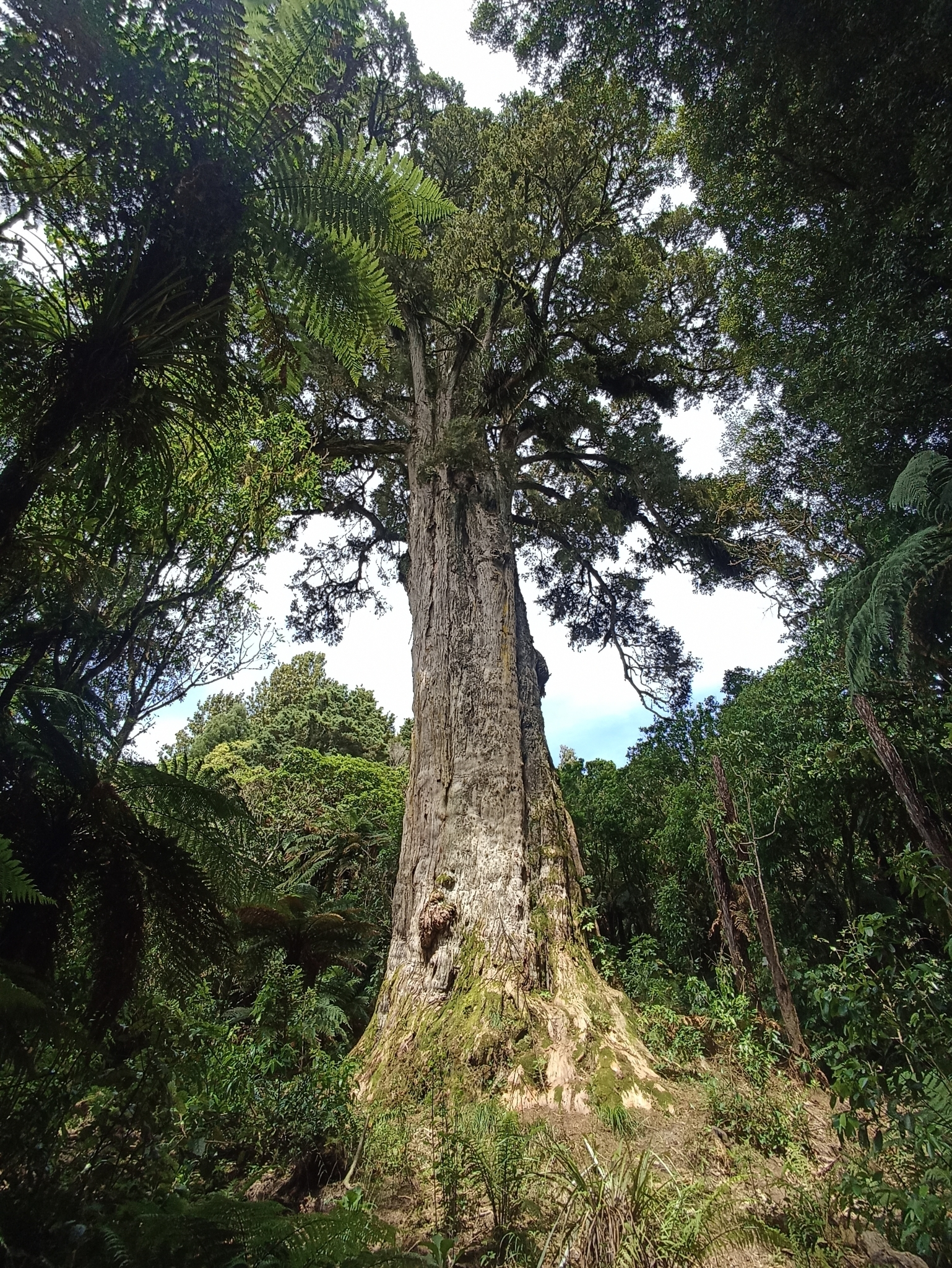
A tōtara tree.

Te Whakaruru of Ngāti Te Takinga (a hapū of Ngāti Pikiao) decided to chop down a tōtara tree called Rakeiao in the Waione area between Ruato and Ōkataina, which was inside Tarāwhai's territories. He was discovered by Taiorurua, who led out a party with Tiko to confront Te Whakaruru. When he refused to stop what he was doing, they went to the pā at Titoki and convinced them to join them in getting revenge on Te Whakaruru.

In the meanwhile, Te Whakaruru had chopped down the tree and brought it back through Ruato. He was confronted by Taiorurua's elder brother, Tuahia, who killed him. In a version told by Manuariki, the body was left in a stream now called Te Whakaruru, from which it was collected by Ngāti Te Takinga. In Fleming's version, it was left under a pukatea tree which was still standing on the Okataina road until the twentieth century. Ngāti Te Takinga promised to get revenge.

When Tarāwhai heard of this, he persuaded Tuahia and Tauorurua to bring their people to Ōkataina so that he could protect them. They were not keen to leave their land, but Tarāwhai persuaded them, saying "the shadow of man passes away, but the shadow of the land remains," which has become proverbial.

Ngāti Te Takinga gathered all the hapu of Ngāti Pikiao and led them to Ruato, which they found abandoned, except for an old man called Potonga of Ngāti Waiiti. They settled down on the land at Ruato and began chopping down the trees, so Tarāwhai and Tuahia marched out to attack. They were met by Te Whakaruru's son, Te Rinui, who called for peace. A marriage alliance was agreed: Tuahia's daughter Tuihiora married Te Po of Ngāti Te Takinga. Tuahia returned to Ruato, but Ngāti Te Takinga were allowed to live there too. Tarāwhai received two dogskin mats, a patu, and a hei tiki in exchange for a tōtara canoe called Murirangawhenua.

=== Later life ===
After the Ngāti Raukawa–Ngāti Kahu-pungapunga War, some of the surviving members of Ngāti Kahu-pungapunga fled to the Rotorua region. According Ānaha Te Rāhui, Wahiao settled some of these refugees at Whekau on Lake Ōkataina. Tarāwhai found out about this, went to Whekau and killed one of their men, Paiere, while he was digging for fern root. Ngāti Kahu-pungapunga travelled on to Tuhourangi and Ngāti Uruhina.

When Wahiao sought allies in attacking Whatumairangi, who had committed adultery with his wife, Tarāwhai and his son Te Rangitakaroro received his appeal favourably and committed men to the endeavour.

== Family and legacy ==
Tarāwhai married Rangimaikuku, daughter of Murimano and a descendant of Rangitihi. They had five children:

- Te Ahiahiotahu, a daughter, who moved away.
- Te Rangitakaroro, ancestor of the hapū of Ngāti Rangitakaroro
- Tārewakaiahi, who went to live with Ngāti Pikiao on Lake Rotoiti.
- Tāporahitaua, who left Ōkataina and settled at Kawerau and Mataatua.
- Rongoheikume
- Te Rangihaemata, who was killed by Ngāti Kahuūpoko.

The wharenui of Waikōhatu marae is named Tarāwhai after this chief.

== Bibliography ==
- Grey, George (1854). Polynesian Mythology and Ancient Traditional History of the New Zealanders.
- Neich, Roger (2001). Carved histories: Rotorua ngati tarawhai woodcarving. Auckland, N.Z: Auckland University Press. ISBN 9781869402570.
- Stafford, D.M. (1967). Te Arawa: A History of the Arawa People. Rotorua, New Zealand: A.H. & A.W. Reed.
