= Moana Manley =

NZ swimmer and beauty pageant winner

- Born: 28 October 1935; Rotorua, New Zealand
- Died: 15 November 2017 (aged 82); Auckland, New Zealand
- Beauty pageant titleholder
- Title: Miss Universe New Zealand 1954
- Major competitions: Miss Universe New Zealand 1954 (Winner); Miss Universe 1954 (Unplaced)

Moana Nui-a-Kiwa Hinemoa Whaanga (née Manley; 28 October 1935 – 15 November 2017) was a New Zealand swimmer and beauty pageant winner. In 1954, she became the first Māori to win the Miss New Zealand title.

== Early life and family ==
Of Te Arawa descent, Manley was born at Ngāpuna on the outskirts of Rotorua on 28 October 1935, to Nimera Rikihana and Reginald George Harwood "Jim" Manley. Nimera affiliated to the Tūhourangi, Ngāti Pikiao and Ngāti Tarāwhai iwi, and was a direct descendant of Wahiao, the brother of Hinemoa; she was also a cousin of Guide Rangi. Moana Manley's father was from England, and was a photographer, filmmaker, and well-known high diver both in England and in New Zealand. He was the grandson of Surgeon General William Manley who was awarded the Victoria Cross for his actions at the Battle of Gate Pā during the New Zealand wars.

Manley's family moved to Auckland when she was an infant, living first in the eastern suburbs and then Parnell. In September 1943, she presented a bouquet to Eleanor Roosevelt at the Auckland Town Hall during the latter's visit to New Zealand. Manley was educated at Epsom Girls' Grammar School, and went on to study at Auckland Teachers' Training College. In January 1956, she married Māui Whaanga, and the couple went on to have five children.

== Swimming and beauty pageants ==
Manley was nominated for the New Zealand swimming team to go to the 1954 British Empire and Commonwealth Games in Vancouver, but she did not compete because of her beauty pageant commitments. Also in 1954, she won the pageant titles of Miss Swimming and Miss Auckland, and subsequently won the inaugural competition for Miss Universe New Zealand. She went on to represent New Zealand at the Miss Universe 1954 competition, where she fainted while posing under the hot sun.

== Death ==
Whaanga died in Auckland on 15 November 2017, aged 82, following a stroke. She was buried at Hamilton Park Cemetery, Hamilton.
