= Eramiha Neke Kapua =

Ngāti Tarawhai carver, tohunga, farmer

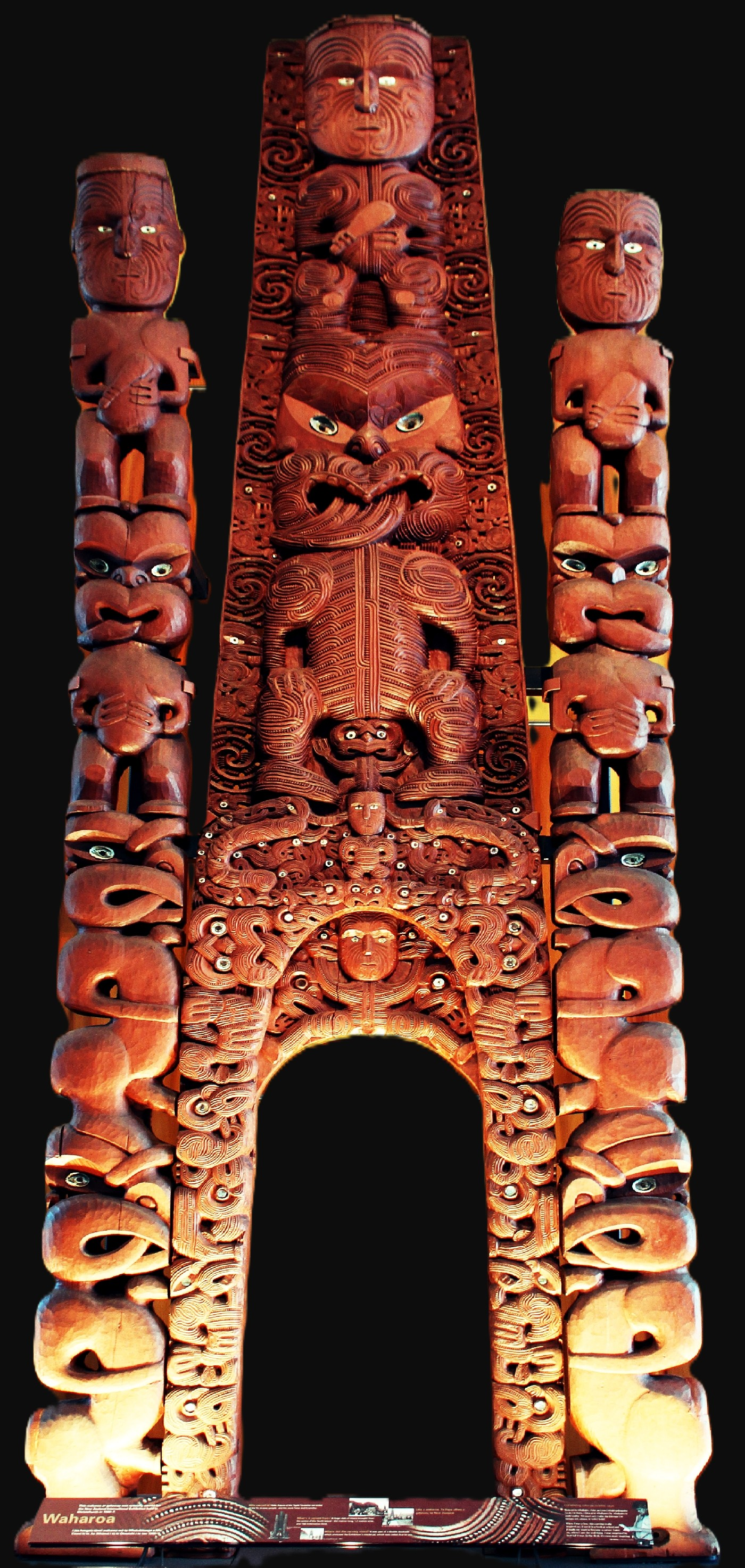
Waharoa by Neke Kapua and his two sons, Tene and Eremiha, (1906) in museum Te Papa Tongarewa

Eramiha Neke Kapua (c. 1875 – 7 July 1955) was a New Zealand carver, tohunga and farmer. Of Māori descent, he identified with the Ngāti Tarāwhai and Te Arawa iwi. He was born in Ruato, Lake Rotoiti, New Zealand circa 1875. His father was Neke Kapua, a carver, and his mother was Mereana Waitere, the elder sister of Tene Waitere, another carver. Kapua was commissioned to create carvings for the model village at Whakarewarewa, as well as the New Zealand International Exhibition of 1906 in Christchurch.
