= Avianca Böhm =

Miss Universe 2012 contestant

- Born: Avianca Böhm; 1 January 1990 (age 36); Pretoria, South Africa
- Height: 1.75 m (5 ft 9 in)
- Beauty pageant titleholder
- Title: Miss New Zealand 2012
- Hair color: Blonde
- Eye color: Blue
- Major competition: Miss New Zealand 2012

Avianca Böhm (born 1 January 1990) is a South African-born New Zealand actress, model and former beauty pageant titleholder.

Avianca Bohm was crowned “Miss New Zealand 2012″ by Priyani Puketapu (Miss New Zealand 2011) at the grand finale of Miss New Zealand 2012 beauty pageant at the Amora Hotel, Wellington, New Zealand on Sunday, 3 June 2012. Bohm was representing Auckland although she did not meet the requirements (New Zealand citizenship) of the Miss Universe pageant for which the winner automatically qualifies.

There was dispute as to whether the judges were aware of this ineligibility. Bohm refused to step down despite being informed of her ineligibility. There was significant backlash from the New Zealand public over the possibility of "fast-tracking" of her citizenship on these grounds alone; some have credited this to a dislike of "celebrity exception" within New Zealand culture.

On 31 July 2012 Böhm was stripped of her crown, which was then awarded to pageant runner-up Talia Bennett.

Awards and achievements
Preceded by Priyani Puketapu	Miss New Zealand; 2012 (relinquished)	Succeeded by Talia Bennett
