= Talia Bennett =

New Zealand beauty pageant contestant

- Born: 1988 or 1989 (age 37–38); Auckland, New Zealand
- Height: 1.73 m (5 ft 8 in)
- Beauty pageant titleholder
- Title: Miss New Zealand 2012 (1st runner-up)
- Hair color: Black
- Major competitions: Miss New Zealand 2011 (1st runner-up); Miss New Zealand 2012 (1st runner-up); Miss Universe 2012 (Unplaced)

Talia Bennett is a New Zealand television host, model and beauty pageant titleholder who was 1st runner-up at Miss New Zealand 2012. The winner of Miss New Zealand 2012 was Avianca Böhm. She was subsequently stripped of her crown and replaced by Bennett.

== Early life ==
Bennett is a commercial property valuer whose personal interests include yoga, health, nutrition, fashion and tennis.

== Miss New Zealand 2011 ==
Bennett was first runner-up. Priyani Puketapu won the Miss New Zealand title.

== Miss New Zealand 2012 ==
Bennett was first runner-up for a second time. On 31 July 2012, Avianca Böhm was stripped of her crown, which was then awarded to Bennett.

Awards and achievements
Preceded by Avianca Böhm	Miss New Zealand; 2012	Succeeded by Holly Cassidy
