= Ana Haložan =

Slovene model

- Born: September 27, 1996 (age 30)
- Beauty pageant titleholder
- Title: Miss Universe Slovenia 2015
- Hair color: Brown
- Eye color: Brown
- Major competitions: Miss Universe Slovenia 2015 (Winner); Miss Universe 2015 (withdrew)

Ana Haložan (born September 27, 1996) is a Slovene model and beauty pageant titleholder who was crowned as Miss Universe Slovenia 2015.

== Personal life ==
Haložan is a student at Commercial School in Maribor. She has traveled around Slovenia and Italy working as a model.

=== Miss Universe Slovenia 2015 ===
On October 3, 2015, Haložan was crowned Miss Universe Slovenia 2015 at Hotel Union Ljubljana. In addition to several prizes like makeup, shoes, and dresses, the new Miss Slovenia won a €20,000 scholarship to study at the Zagreb School of Economics and Management. She was also supposed to compete at the Miss Universe 2015 pageant in Las Vegas on December 20, 2015. However, shortly after arriving to the United States, she fell in a hotel bathroom and hit her head, requiring medical attention. The doctors advised rest, so the organizer decided it would be too risky for her to participate.

Awards and achievements
Preceded by Urška Bračko	Miss Universe Slovenia; 2015	Succeeded by Lucija Potočnik
