= Samantha McClung =

New Zealand beauty pageant titleholder

- Born: 1994 or 1995 (age 30–31); Christchurch, New Zealand
- Height: 1.79 m (5 ft 10 in)
- Beauty pageant titleholder
- Title: Miss New Zealand 2015
- Hair color: Blonde
- Eye color: Blue
- Major competitions: Miss New Zealand 2015 (Winner); Miss Universe 2015 (Unplaced) (Miss Photogenic)

Samantha McClung (born 1994 or 1995) is a New Zealand model and beauty pageant titleholder who was crowned Miss Universe New Zealand 2015 and represented her country at the Miss Universe 2015 pageant.

== Miss New Zealand 2015 ==
McClung was crowned Miss New Zealand 2015 (also called Miss Universe New Zealand 2015) and represented Christchurch at the conclusion of the national pageant finals held on 24 October 2015. She succeeds Miss Universe New Zealand 2014 – Rachel Maree Millns. McClung competed at the Miss Universe 2015, received Miss Photogenic award but was Unplaced.

Awards and achievements
Preceded by (Puerto Rico) Gabriela Berrios	Miss Photogenic Universe; 2015	Succeeded by (Albania) Lindita Idrizi
Preceded by Rachel Maree Millns	Miss Universe New Zealand; 2015	Succeeded by Tania Dawson
