= Miss Universe 2015 =

64th edition of the Miss Universe pageant

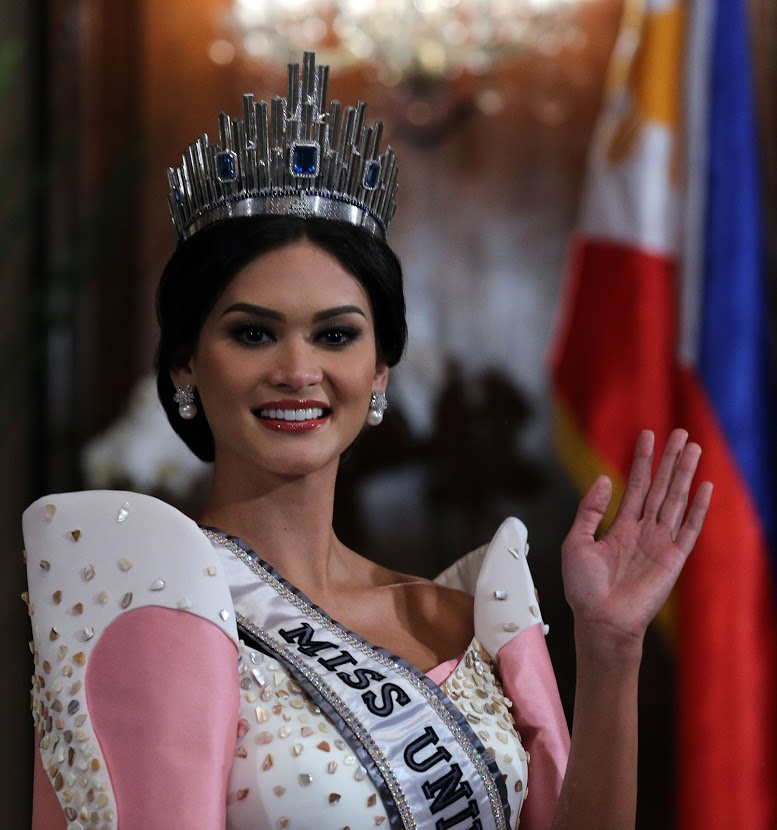
- Pia Wurtzbach
- Date: December 20, 2015
- Presenters: Steve Harvey; Roselyn Sánchez
- Entertainment: Charlie Puth; The Band Perry; Seal
- Venue: The AXIS, Las Vegas, Nevada, United States
- Broadcaster: Fox; Azteca
- Entrants: 80
- Placements: 15
- Withdrawals: Egypt; Ethiopia; Guam; Kazakhstan; Kenya; Lithuania; Saint Lucia; Slovenia; Sri Lanka; Switzerland; Trinidad and Tobago; Turks and Caicos Islands
- Returns: Cayman Islands; Denmark; Montenegro; Vietnam
- Winner: Pia Wurtzbach; Philippines
- Congeniality: Whitney Shikongo, Angola
- Best National Costume: Aniporn Chalermburanawong, Thailand
- Photogenic: Samantha McClung, New Zealand

Miss Universe 2015 was the 64th Miss Universe pageant, held at The AXIS in Las Vegas, Nevada, United States, on December 20, 2015. This was the first edition of the pageant to be held under the ownership of WME/IMG, which purchased the Miss Universe Organization from Donald Trump on September 14, 2015. Consequently, it was also the first Miss Universe event to be aired by Fox and Azteca as the pageant's respective English and Spanish broadcasters instead of NBC.

At the conclusion of the event, Pia Wurtzbach of the Philippines was crowned Miss Universe 2015 by Paulina Vega of Colombia. Wurtzbach was the third Filipina to win Miss Universe after forty-two years in the pageant's history. The first runner-up was Ariadna Gutiérrez from Colombia, and the second runner-up was Olivia Jordan from the United States.

Contestants from eighty countries and territories competed in this year's pageant. The competition featured Steve Harvey as host and Roselyn Sánchez as backstage host. Charlie Puth, The Band Perry, and Seal performed in this year's pageant.

== Background ==
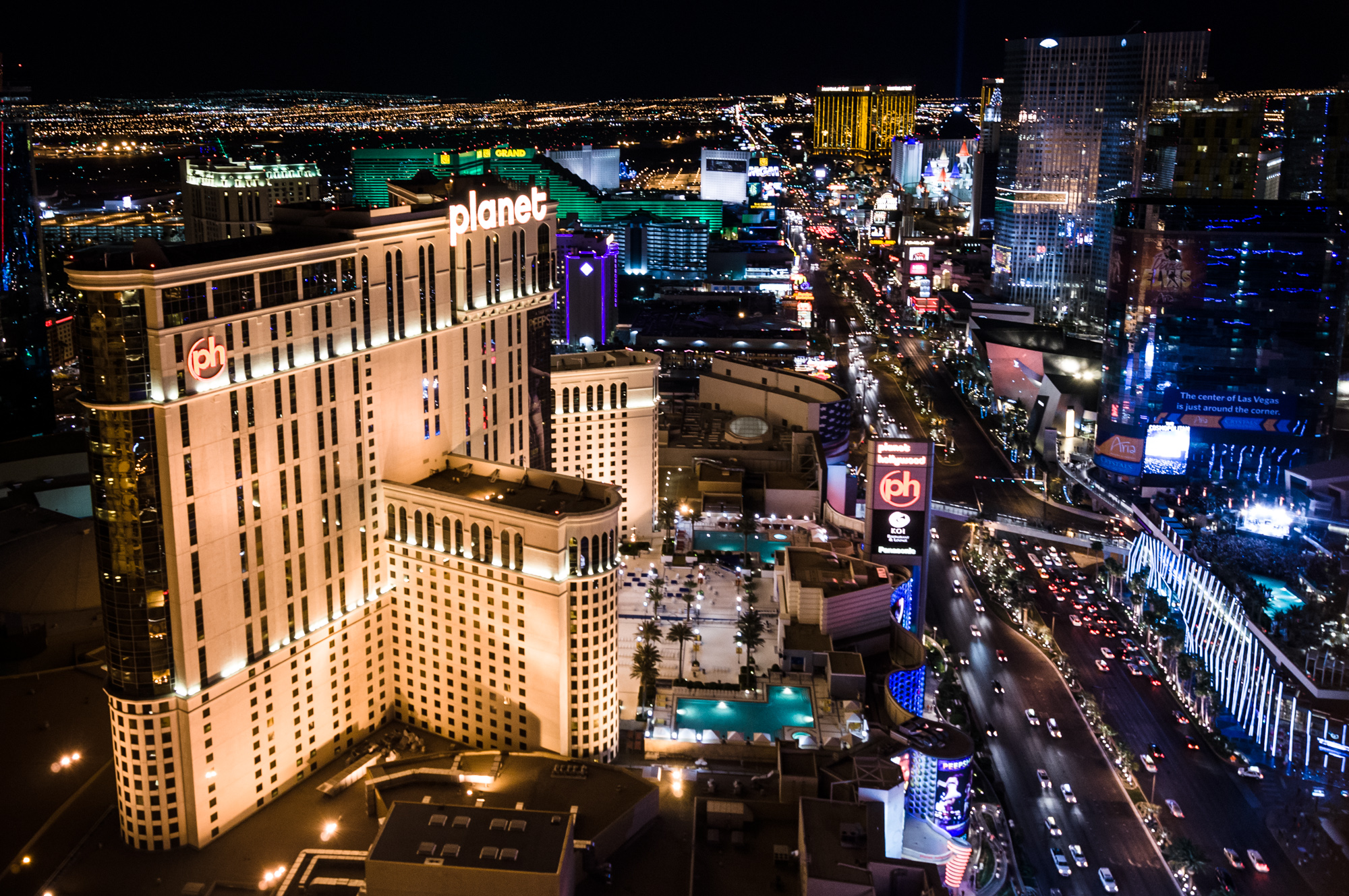
Planet Hollywood Resort and Casino, the venue for Miss Universe 2015

=== Location and date ===
Following the statements about Mexican immigrants made by Donald Trump during a speech on June 16, 2015, Colombia withdrew its bid to host the competition after the country's condemnation of Trump. Aside from that, NBCUniversal and UniMás (Spanish broadcaster of the pageant) refused to broadcast the Miss USA 2015 pageant and terminated their rights to the pageant. This prompted Trump to file lawsuits after both NBC and UniMás refused to air the pageant.

On September 11, 2015, Trump purchased the stake of NBCUniversal in Miss Universe, making him the sole owner of the Miss Universe Organization. After three days, on September 14, 2015, WME/IMG acquired the Miss Universe Organization which was previously owned by Trump.

On October 28, 2015, more than a month after WME/IMG purchased the organization from Trump, Fox announced that it secured the rights to air the pageant, which would be held on December 20, 2015, and the Miss USA 2016 pageant which would air in 2016. The pageant took place in The AXIS theatre of Planet Hollywood in Las Vegas, Nevada, United States. In December, Azteca América acquired the Spanish-language rights to air the pageant.

=== Selection of participants ===
Contestants from eighty countries and territories were selected to compete in the competition. Twelve of these delegates were appointees to their national titles and three were selected to replace the original dethroned winner.

Amina Dagi, Miss Austria 2012, was appointed to represent Austria after Annika Grill, Miss Austria 2015, decided to only compete at Miss World 2015 due to the conflicting schedules of the two pageants. Camille Cerf, Miss France 2015, was to compete in Miss Universe 2015, while Flora Coquerel, Miss France 2014, was to compete at Miss Universe 2014. A switch happened between the two, due to a conflict of schedule between Miss Universe and Miss France 2016, at which Cerf was contractually obligated to be present. Ornella Obone, third runner-up of Miss Gabon 2015, was appointed to represent Gabon after Reine Ngotala, Miss Gabon 2015, decided to only compete at Miss World 2015 due to the conflicting schedules of the two pageants. Cynthia Samuel of Lebanon, Vladislava Evtushenko of Russia, and Refilwe Mthimunye of South Africa are also appointees to their titles after their original titleholders, Miss Lebanon 2015 Valerie Abou Chacra, Miss Russia 2015 Sofia Nikitchuk, and Miss South Africa 2015 Liesl Laurie were unable to compete because of commitments to Miss World 2015.

Barbara Ljiljak originally was due to represent Croatia at Miss Universe, but broke her arm hours before leaving for the competition, preventing her from participating. Mirta Kuštan, the second runner-up of Miss Universe Croatia 2015, represented Croatia at the pageant. Kushboo Ramnawaj, Miss Mauritius 2014, was to represent Mauritius at the pageant, but was replaced by Sheetal Khadun, first runner-up of Miss Mauritius 2014. Myriam Arévalos, Miss Earth Paraguay 2015, assumed the Miss Universe Paraguay 2015 title after Laura Garcete, Miss Universe Paraguay 2015, became pregnant during her reign and was dethroned.

The 2015 edition saw the returns of Cayman Islands, Denmark, Montenegro, and Vietnam. Cayman Islands and Montenegro last competed in 2012, while Denmark and Vietnam last competed in 2013. Egypt, Ethiopia, Guam, Kazakhstan, Kenya, Lithuania, Saint Lucia, Slovenia, Sri Lanka, Trinidad and Tobago, and Turks and Caicos Islands withdrew. Aigerim Smagulova was appointed as the representative of Kazakhstan at Miss Universe after Regina Valter, Miss Universe Kazakhstan 2015, decided to compete in Miss Universe 2016. However, Smagulova withdrew for personal reasons. Miss Universe Slovenia Ana Haložan suffered an accident when she arrived in Las Vegas, which resulted in hospitalization, preventing her from participating in registration activities, interviews and pictorials. She was not present at the first official events but stayed in Las Vegas until the pageant was over. She suffered a seizure and had her face partially paralyzed. Despite her withdrawal, she was given an opportunity to walk on the stage during the live telecast. Egypt, Ethiopia, Guam, Kenya, Lithuania, Saint Lucia, Sri Lanka, Trinidad and Tobago, and Turks and Caicos withdrew after their respective organizations failed to hold a national competition or appoint a delegate.

Initially, Costa Rica, Mexico, and Panama decided to not participate in this edition due to the statements about Mexican immigrants made by Donald Trump. However, after the acquisition of the Miss Universe Organization by WME/IMG, the three countries decided to return to Miss Universe and compete.

=== Incidents during the pageant ===
The broadcast received worldwide media attention due to an error made regarding the winner. Host Steve Harvey initially announced Ariadna Gutiérrez of Colombia as the new Miss Universe. Minutes after her coronation, Harvey returned to the stage and apologized, stating that Gutiérrez was the 1st runner-up while Pia Wurtzbach of the Philippines was the winner. He later stated that he had been confused when reading the winner's name because both names were on the card and he only noticed the "1st" by Colombia's name. Due to this, Paulina Vega had to remove the crown and sash from Gutiérrez and crown Wurtzbach as her actual successor. After the coronation, Gutiérrez burst into tears due to the incident while being surrounded by her co-candidates. Wurtzbach tried to join in and talk to Gutiérrez, but was told by some of her co-candidates to "step back", while the others snubbed her entirely.

== Results ==
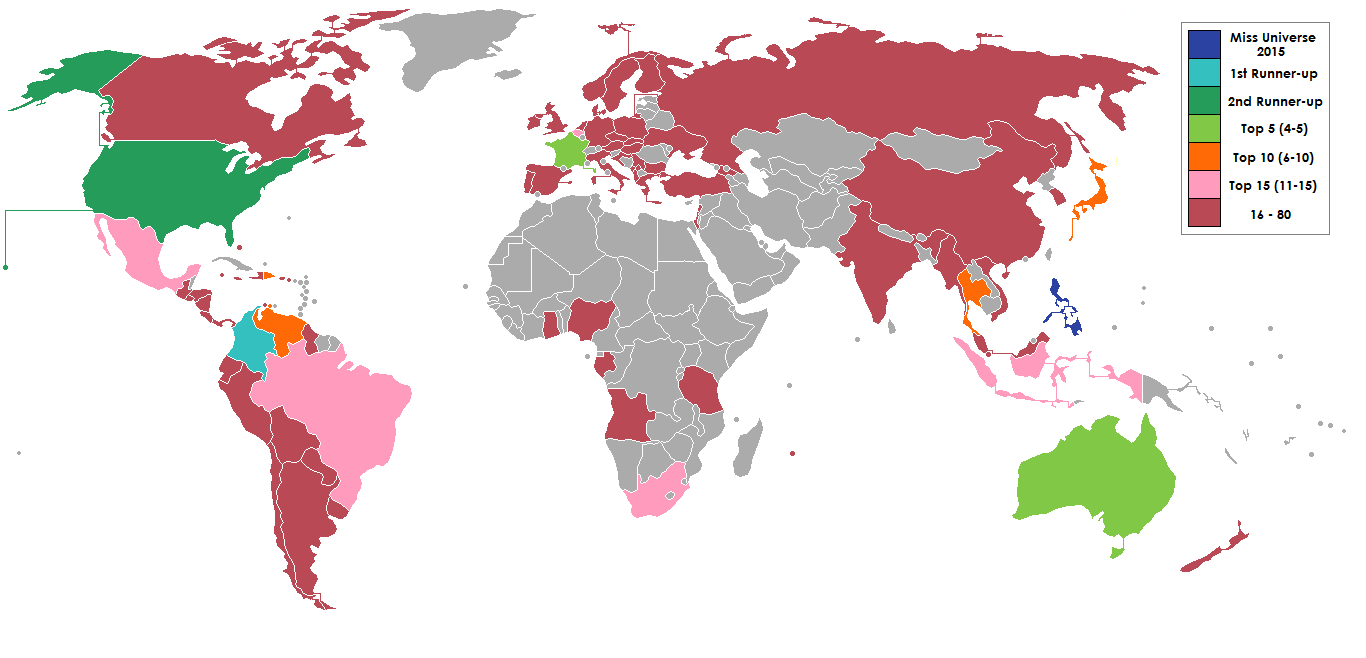
Miss Universe 2015 participating countries and territories.

=== Placements ===
| Placement | Contestant |
|---|---|
| Miss Universe 2015 | Philippines – Pia Wurtzbach |
| 1st Runner-Up | Colombia – Ariadna Gutiérrez (Note: During the live telecast, at first, Gutiérrez was first announced as the winner due to an announcement mistake by Steve Harvey. Once Harvey apologized to the audience, Gutiérrez was announced as the 1st Runner-Up, and Pia Wurtzbach as the winner.) |
| 2nd Runner-Up | United States – Olivia Jordan |
| Top 5 | Australia – Monika Radulovic; France – Flora Coquerel |
| Top 10 | Curaçao – Kanisha Sluis; Dominican Republic – Clarissa Molina; Japan – Ariana Miyamoto; Thailand – Aniporn Chalermburanawong; Venezuela – Mariana Jiménez |
| Top 15 | Belgium – Annelies Törös; Brazil – Marthina Brandt; Indonesia – Anindya Kusuma Putri; Mexico – Wendy Esparza; South Africa – Refilwe Mthimunye |

=== Special awards ===
| Award | Contestant |
|---|---|
| Miss Congeniality | Angola – Whitney Shikongo |
| Miss Photogenic | New Zealand – Samantha McClung |

==== Best National Costume ====
| Placement | Contestant |
|---|---|
| Winner | Thailand – Aniporn Chalermburanawong |
| Top 5 | Argentina – Claudia Barrionuevo; China – Xue Yun Fang; Nicaragua – Daniela Torres; Panama – Gladys Brandao |

== Pageant ==
=== Format ===
Same with 2014, fifteen semifinalists were chosen through the preliminary competition— composed of the swimsuit and evening gown competitions and closed-door interviews. The fifteen semifinalists participated in the swimsuit competition, with ten advancing in the competition for the evening gown competition. Five contestants will advance to participate in the question and answer portion. However, for the first time since 2000, from five, three will advance to participate in the final question and the final walk. For the first time in this edition, a real-time voting system was implemented in the pageant. Viewers can score the contestants during the swimsuit, evening gown, question and answer, and final question rounds as they happen live. The global vote and all other eliminated contestants that are not part of the Final 3 will help determine who will be the next Miss Universe.

=== Selection committee ===
==== Preliminary competition ====
- Erika Albies – Vice President of Global Fashion Communications at IMG
- Erin Brady – Miss USA 2013 from Connecticut
- Julio Caro – Independent film and television producer and talent manager
- Keiko Uraguchi – Director of Digital Partnerships for WME/IMG
- Nischelle Turner– Correspondent for Emmy Award-winning Entertainment Tonight
- Rocky Motwani – Entrepreneur who recently co-founded his first fintech company, Jiko Services
- Zak Soreff – Entertainment marketing expert

==== Final telecast ====
- Emmitt Smith – Former college and professional football player
- Niecy Nash – Emmy Award-nominated actress
- Olivia Culpo – Miss Universe 2012 from United States
- Perez Hilton – Blogger, columnist and television personality

== Contestants ==
Eighty contestants competed for the title.

| Country/Territory | Contestant | Age (Note: Ages at the time of the pageant) | Hometown |
|---|---|---|---|
| Albania | Megi Luka | 19 | Fushë-Krujë |
| Angola | Whitney Shikongo | 20 | Huíla |
| Argentina | Claudia Barrionuevo | 24 | Salta |
| Aruba | Alysha Boekhoudt | 21 | Oranjestad |
| Australia | Monika Radulovic | 25 | Sydney |
| Austria | Amina Dagi | 20 | Vienna |
| (The Bahamas) Bahamas | Toria Nichole Penn | 27 | Nassau |
| Belgium | Annelies Törös | 20 | Antwerp |
| Bolivia | Romina Rocamonje | 23 | Beni |
| Brazil | Marthina Brandt | 23 | Vale Real |
| British Virgin Islands | Adorya Rocio Baly | 22 | Tortola |
| Bulgaria | Radostina Todorova | 20 | Vratsa |
| Canada | Paola Nunez | 24 | Toronto |
| Cayman Islands | Tonie Chisholm | 27 | Grand Cayman |
| Chile | María Belén Jerez | 25 | Viña del Mar |
| China | Xue Yun Fang | 21 | Shenzhen |
| Colombia | Ariadna Gutiérrez | 21 | Sincelejo |
| Costa Rica | Brenda Castro | 23 | Limón |
| Croatia | Mirta Kuštan | 22 | Krapinske Toplice |
| Curaçao | Kanisha Sluis | 19 | Willemstad |
| Czech Republic | Nikol Švantnerová | 23 | Šumperk |
| Denmark | Cecilie Wellemberg | 21 | Copenhagen |
| Dominican Republic | Clarissa Molina | 24 | Moca |
| Ecuador | Francesca Cipriani | 23 | Guayaquil |
| El Salvador | Idubina Rivas | 22 | San Salvador |
| Finland | Rosa-Maria Ryyti | 21 | Helsinki |
| France | Flora Coquerel | 21 | Orléanais |
| Gabon | Ornella Obone | 19 | Oyem |
| (Georgia (country)) Georgia | Janet Kerdikoshvili | 24 | Tbilisi |
| Germany | Sarah-Lorraine Riek | 23 | Munich |
| Ghana | Hilda Akua | 26 | Kumasi |
| (United Kingdom) Great Britain | Nena France | 25 | London |
| Greece | Mikaela Eleni Fotiadi | 21 | Athens |
| Guatemala | Jeimmy Aburto | 21 | Guatemala City |
| Guyana | Shauna Ramdyhan | 25 | Georgetown |
| Haiti | Lisa Drouillard | 23 | Port-au-Prince |
| Honduras | Iroshka Elvir | 24 | Choluteca |
| Hungary | Nikoletta Nagy | 21 | Miskolc |
| India | Urvashi Rautela | 21 | Kotdwar |
| Indonesia | Anindya Kusuma Putri | 23 | Semarang |
| (Republic of Ireland) Ireland | Joanna Cooper | 21 | Derry |
| Israel | Avigail Alfatov | 19 | Acre |
| Italy | Giada Pezzaioli | 22 | Montichiari |
| Jamaica | Sharlene Rädlein | 25 | Kingston |
| Japan | Ariana Miyamoto | 21 | Nagasaki |
| Kosovo | Mirjeta Shala | 21 | Vučitrn |
| Lebanon | Cynthia Samuel | 20 | Beirut |
| Malaysia | Vanessa Tevi Kumares | 24 | Seremban |
| Mauritius | Sheetal Khadun | 26 | Rose-Hill |
| Mexico | Wendy Esparza | 24 | Aguascalientes |
| Montenegro | Maja Čukić | 20 | Podgorica |
| Myanmar | May Barani Thaw | 25 | Yangon |
| Netherlands | Jessie Jazz Vuijk | 20 | Amsterdam |
| New Zealand | Samantha McClung | 20 | Christchurch |
| Nicaragua | Daniela Torres | 25 | Managua |
| Nigeria | Debbie Collins | 23 | Lagos |
| Norway | Martine Rødseth | 24 | Nord-Odal |
| Panama | Gladys Brandao | 24 | Los Santos |
| Paraguay | Myriam Arévalos | 22 | Asunción |
| Peru | Laura Spoya | 24 | Lima |
| Philippines | Pia Wurtzbach | 26 | Cagayan de Oro |
| Poland | Weronika Szmajdzińska | 21 | Szczecin |
| Portugal | Emília Araújo | 24 | Angra do Heroísmo |
| Puerto Rico | Catalina Morales | 25 | Guaynabo |
| Russia | Vladislava Evtushenko | 19 | Chita |
| Serbia | Daša Radosavljević | 19 | Kragujevac |
| Singapore | Lisa Marie White | 22 | Singapore |
| Slovakia | Denisa Vyšňovská | 21 | Prievidza |
| South Africa | Refilwe Mthimunye | 24 | Bronkhorstspruit |
| South Korea | Kim Seo-yeon | 23 | Seoul |
| Spain | Carla Barber | 25 | Las Palmas |
| Sweden | Paulina Brodd | 21 | Stockholm |
| Tanzania | Lorraine Marriot | 21 | Dar es Salaam |
| Thailand | Aniporn Chalermburanawong | 21 | Lampang |
| Turkey | Aslı Melisa Uzun | 20 | Ankara |
| Ukraine | Anna Vergelskaya | 27 | Kyiv |
| United States | Olivia Jordan | 27 | Tulsa |
| Uruguay | Bianca Sánchez | 19 | Montevideo |
| Venezuela | Mariana Jiménez | 22 | Caracas |
| Vietnam | Phạm Hương | 24 | Hải Phòng |
