= Ria van Dyke =

New Zealand model (born 1989)

- Born: 16 February 1989 (age 37); Kawerau, New Zealand
- Height: 5 ft 8 in (1.73 m)
- Beauty pageant titleholder
- Title: Miss New Zealand 2010
- Major competitions: Miss New Zealand 2010 (Winner); Miss Universe 2010 (unplaced)

Ria van Dyke (born 16 February 1989) is a New Zealand model and beauty pageant titleholder who was crowned Miss Universe New Zealand 2010. Van Dyke represented New Zealand at the Miss Universe 2010 in Las Vegas, Nevada, US, but unplaced.

== Personal life ==
Van Dyke was born in Kawerau, in the Eastern Bay of Plenty, New Zealand. She graduated from the University of Auckland with a Bachelor of Arts in 2010 and a BA(Hons) with first-class honours in sociology in 2012.

Awards and achievements
Preceded by Katie Taylor	Miss New Zealand; 2010	Succeeded by Priyani Puketapu
