= Rangitīaria Dennan =

New Zealand Māori tribal leader and tourist guide (1897–1970)

Rangitīaria Dennan (née Ratema) OBE
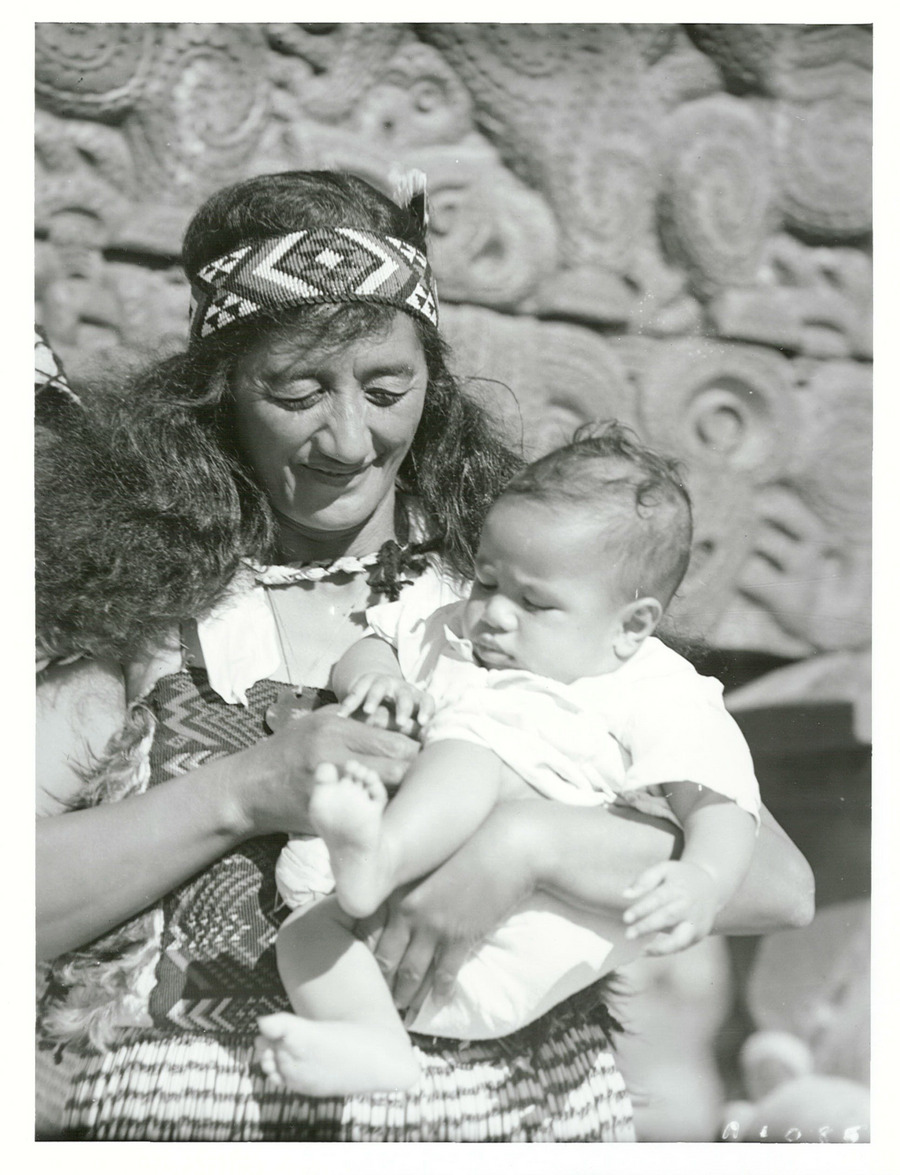
- Rangitīaria Dennan with baby, c. 1945
- Born: 14 July 1897; Ngapuna, New Zealand
- Died: 13 August 1970 (aged 73)
- Other name: Guide Rangi
- Occupations: tribal leader, teacher and tourist guide
- Known for: Promotion of Māori culture

Rangitīaria Dennan MBE SSStJ (née Ratema; 14 July 1897 – 13 August 1970), known as Guide Rangi, was a New Zealand tribal leader, teacher and tourist guide. Of Māori descent, she identified with the Ngāti Pikiao, Ngāti Tarāwhai, Te Arawa and Tūhourangi iwi. A granddaughter of Tene Waitere, she was born in Ngāpuna, near Rotorua, New Zealand. She attended Hukarere Native School for Girls. In 1925 she gave up teaching and nursing to devote herself to guide work using her unique knowledge of lore and art.

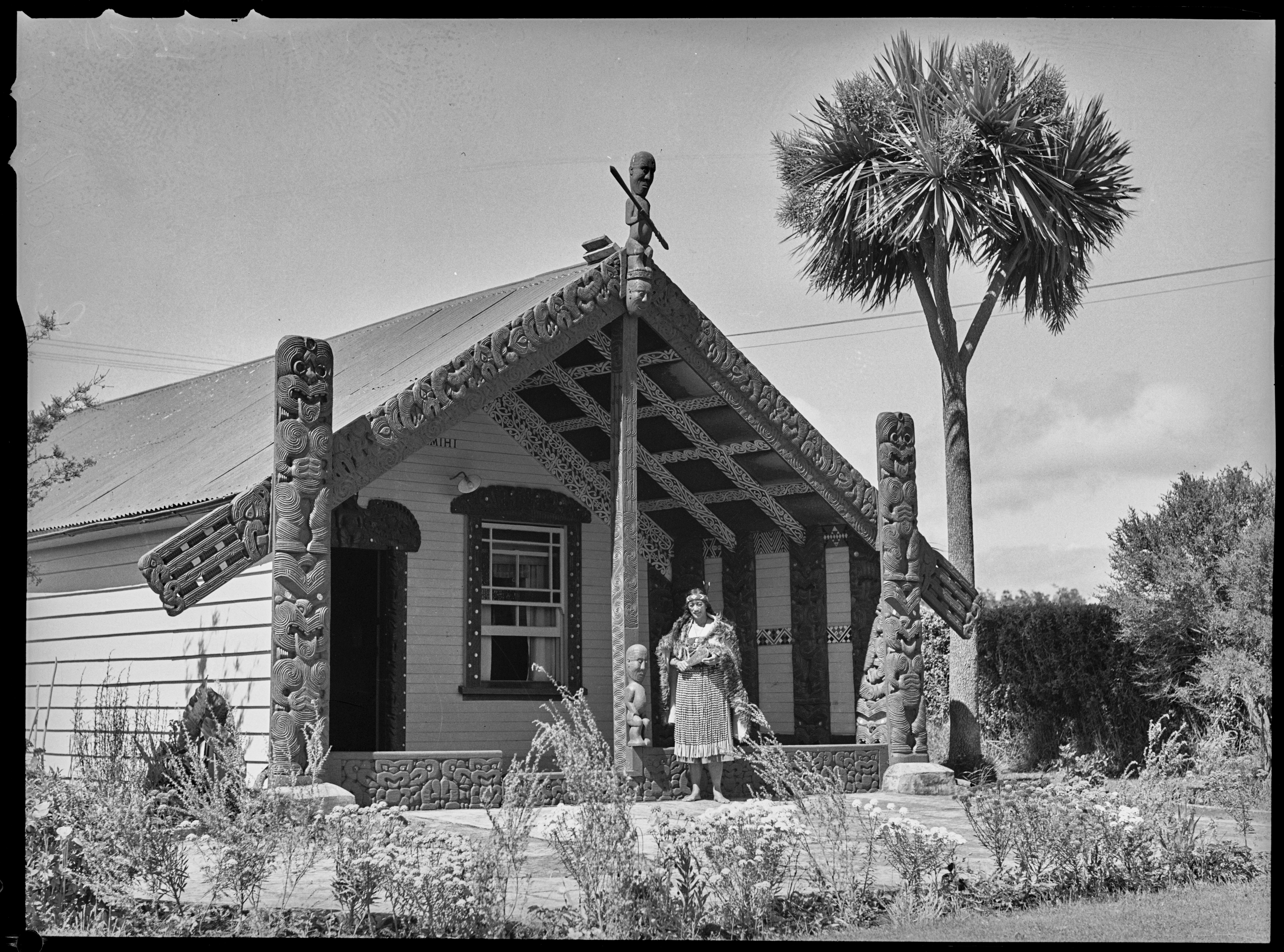
Rangitīaria Dennan's house - designed to resemble a Marae and decorated with carvings by her grandfather, Rotorua, January 1947

Dennan was the subject of Encyclopædia Britannica's best photo of 1943. Captured by Wellington photographer James Thompson it depicted Dennan giving First Lady Eleanor Roosevelt a Māori hongi.

Dennan's husband died in 1943. In January 1954 Dennan escorted Queen Elizabeth and Prince Philip, around geothermal attractions and the model village at Whakarewarewa, Rotorua. Two months later she was in Australia as part of a two-week visit promoting Tourism in New Zealand, sponsored by the Central Travel Bureau.

In the 1957 New Year Honours she was appointed a Member of the Order of the British Empire for services to the tourist movement. In 1949 she was appointed a Serving Sister of the Order of St John for her services to St John.
