= Wero Tāroi =

Master Māori carver (c. 1810–1880)

Wero Tāroi (c. 1810–1880), also known as Wero Mahikore and Karu, was a notable New Zealand Māori carver of the Ngāti Tarāwhai iwi. He was born at Lake Ōkataina, in the Rotorua district in New Zealand, and active from about 1860. Wero's works include Te Puawai o Te Arawa (the pātaka or storehouse at Auckland Museum), and storehouses such as Tiki-o-Tamamutu at Taupō, Te Puawai-o-Te-Arawa at Maketū, and Tokopikowhakahau at Tāpapa.
