= Miss Universe New Zealand =

National beauty pageant

Miss Universe New Zealand Organization
- Formation: 1926; 100 years ago
- Type: Beauty pageant
- Headquarters: Auckland
- Location: New Zealand
- Official language: English
- National director: Maria Siayngco
- Current titleholder: Kim-Victoria Vincent; Auckland

Miss Universe New Zealand is a national beauty pageant in New Zealand which selects the delegates to participate in the international Miss Universe competition. Qualification for Miss Universe New Zealand is based on regional pageants and/or personal interviews (necessary due to lack of regional pageant in some areas).

== History ==
New Zealanders have contested 44 Miss Universe pageants since its inception in 1952 and is one of 33 countries to win the title. After no entrants were sent to Miss Universe in 2004 and 2005, a new national pageant, Miss Universe New Zealand, was created in 2006.

New Zealand's most successful entrant came in 1983 when Lorraine Downes won the Miss Universe title. The country's only other top five placing came when Delyse Nottle was second runner-up to Shawn Weatherly in 1980. New Zealand has also had three semi-finalist placings, in 1962, 1981 and 1992.

New Zealand is one of only 12 countries to win two or more Miss Photogenic awards, won by Carole Robinson (1969), Delyse Nottle (1980), and Samantha MacClung (2015).

The pageant will allow between the ages of 18 and 27 and are a New Zealand citizen.

== Miss New Zealand 1926―1949 ==
Below is Miss New Zealand who did not compete at Miss Universe, since the coronation was held before Miss Universe happened in 1952.''

Year	Region	Miss New Zealand	Notes
1926	Otago	Thelma McMillan	
1927	Otago	Dale Austen	
No contest between 1927—1946
1947	Otago	Mary Wooton	K. W. Kilpatrick directorship
No contest in 1948
1949	Taranaki	Mary Woodward	

=== Win by region ===
Region	Titles	Years
Otago	3	1926, 1927, 1947
Taranaki	1	1949

== Editions ==
=== Miss Universe New Zealand 2024 ===
Miss Universe New Zealand 2024 marked the show's return after a hiatus since 2019. It was held in the Dorothy Winstone Centre, 16 Howe Street, Freemans Bay, Auckland, on Sunday, 29 September 2024. The grand final was broadcast live via the official Facebook page. The preliminary interview was held on Friday, September 27, 2024, at Cordis Hotel, Auckland, New Zealand.

At the end of the event, Victoria Velasquez Vincent of Auckland was crowned Miss Universe New Zealand 2024 by Diamond Langi of Auckland.

== Titleholders ==
- : Declared as Winner
- : Ended as runner-up or top 5/6 qualification
- : Ended as one of the finalists or semifinalists
- : Ended as special awards winner

On occasion, when the winner does not qualify (due to age) for either contest, a runner-up is sent.

Year	Region	Miss New Zealand	Placement at Miss Universe	Special awards	Notes
Maria Siayngco directorship — a franchise holder to Miss Universe from 2024
2026	Canterbury	Georgia Waddington	TBA		
2025	Auckland	Abbigail "Abby" Sturgin	Unplaced		
2024	Auckland	Kim-Victoria Velasquez Vincent	Unplaced		
2024	Otago	Frances "Franki" Margaret Grant Russell	Did not compete		Along with Yugen Group, Russell withdrew due to compliance issues with the pageant guidelines.
Did not compete between 2020―2023: In 2023 Miss Universe New Zealand was expected to return with Troy Barbagallo (PinkTank Events PTY Ltd.), a businessman who owned Miss Universe Australia and Miss Universe Singapore, but failed to hold a national competition, due to unknown reasons.
Nigel Godfrey directorship — a franchise holder to Miss Universe between 2013―2019
2019	Auckland	Mary Diamond Patrina Langi	Unplaced		Previously, Langi made the semifinals at Miss Earth 2017 as Miss Earth Tonga.
2018	Auckland	Estelle Curd	Unplaced		
2017	Hawke's Bay	Harlem-Cruz Atarangi Ihaia	Unplaced		
2016	Auckland	Tania Pauline Dawson	Unplaced		
2015	Canterbury	Samantha Sarah Lesley McClung	Unplaced	Miss Photogenic	
2014	Wellington	Rachel Maree Millns	Unplaced		
2013	Auckland	Holly Michelle Cassidy	Unplaced		
Val Lott directorship — a franchise holder to Miss Universe between 2006―2012
2012	Rotorua	Talia Bennett	Unplaced		Pageant winner Avianca Böhm lost the crown after failing to gain New Zealand citizenship.
2011	Wellington	Priyani Puketapu	Unplaced		
2010	Auckland	Ria van Dyke	Unplaced		
2009	Auckland	Katie Taylor	Unplaced		
2008	Wellington	Samantha Powell	Unplaced		
2007	Canterbury	Laural Barrett	Unplaced		
2006	Auckland	Elizabeth Gray	Unplaced		
Did not compete between 2004—2005
Dennis Brown directorship — a franchise holder to Miss Universe between 1992―2003
2003	Auckland	Sharee Adams	Unplaced		
Did not compete in 2002
2001	Auckland	Kateao Nehua Jackson	Unplaced		
2000	Auckland	Tonia Peachey	Unplaced		
1999	Otago	Kristy Wilson	Unplaced		
1998	Bay of Plenty	Rosemary Rassell	Unplaced		
1997	Auckland	Marina Alofagia McCartney	Unplaced		
1996	Auckland	Sarah Brady	Unplaced		
1995	Hawke's Bay	Shelley Jeannine Edwards	Unplaced		
1994	Auckland	Nicola Johanne Brighty	Unplaced		
1993	Otago	Karly Donne Kinnaird	Unplaced		
1992	Waikato	Lisa Maree de Montalk	Top 10		
Did not compete between 1990—1991
John Wansbrough (TV New Zealand) directorship — a franchise holder to Miss Universe between 1979―1991
1989	Wellington	Shelley Soffe	Unplaced		
1988	Auckland	Lana Marie Coc-Kroft	Unplaced		
1987	Auckland	Ursula Kim Ryan	Unplaced		
1986	Auckland	Christine "Chris" Atkinson	Unplaced		
1985	Auckland	Claire Glenister	Unplaced		
1984	Auckland	Tania Susan Clague	Unplaced		
1983	Auckland	Lorraine Elizabeth Downes	Miss Universe 1983		Miss Mount Maunganui 1983 — Winner of Dancing with the Stars season 2.
1982	Auckland	Sandra Helen "Sandy" Dexter	Unplaced		
1981	Auckland	Donella Elizabeth Clemmence Thomsen	Top 12		
1980	Bay of Plenty	Diana Delyse Nottle	2nd runner-up	Miss Photogenic	
1979	Auckland	Andrea Kake	Unplaced		
Joe Brown directorship — a franchise holder to Miss Universe between 1960―1978
1978	Auckland	Jane Simmonds	Unplaced		
1977	Manawatū–Whanganui	Donna Anne Schultz	Unplaced		
1976	Canterbury	Janey Kingscote	Unplaced		
1975	Auckland	Barbara Ann Kirkley	Unplaced		
In 1974 the committee set rebranded Miss Universe New Zealand Organization
1974	Wellington	Dianne Sarah Winyard	Unplaced		
1973	Otago	Pamela "Pam" King	Unplaced		
1972	Auckland	Kristine Dayle Allan	Unplaced		
1971	Bay of Plenty	Linda Jan Ritchie	Unplaced		
1970	Wellington	Glenys Elizabeth Treweek	Unplaced		
1969	Auckland	Carole Robinson	Unplaced	Miss Photogenic	
1968	Taranaki	Christine Mary Antunovic	Unplaced		
1967	Canterbury	Pamela McLeod	Unplaced		
1966	Auckland	Heather Gettings	Unplaced		
1965	Wellington	Gay Lorraine Phelps	Unplaced		
1964	Southland	Lyndal Ursula Cruickshank	Unplaced		
1963	Canterbury	Regina Ellen Scandrett	Unplaced		
1962	Canterbury	Lesley Margaret Nichols	Top 15		
1961	Auckland	Leone Mary Main	Did not compete		
1960	Wellington	Lorraine Mawa Jones	Unplaced		
Did not compete between 1958—1959
Auckland Star and NZ Truth Newspaper directorship — a franchise holder to Miss Universe between 1954―1957
1957	Auckland	Arlenne Nesgitt	Did not compete		
Did not compete between 1955—1956
1954	Auckland	Moana Manley	Unplaced		

=== Win by region ===
Region	Titles	Years
Auckland	34	1954, 1957, 1961, 1966, 1969, 1972, 1975, 1978, 1979, 1981, 1982, 1983, 1984, 1985, 1986, 1987, 1988, 1994, 1996, 1997, 1999, 2000, 2001, 2003, 2006, 2009, 2010, 2013, 2016, 2018, 2019, 2024, 2025
Wellington	8	1960, 1965, 1970, 1974, 1989, 2008, 2011, 2014
Canterbury	7	1962, 1963, 1967, 1976, 2007, 2015, 2026
Otago	4	1973, 1993, 1999, 2024
Bay of Plenty	3	1971, 1980, 1998
Hawke's Bay	2	1995, 2017
Rotorua	1	2012
Waikato	1	1992
Manawatū–Whanganui	1	1977
Taranaki	1	1968
Southland	1	1964

== Notes ==
=== Miss World ===
The delegates who represented New Zealand at Miss Universe 1992-1996 also represented New Zealand at Miss World the year before they competed at Miss Universe. The only one of these delegates to place at Miss World was Lisa de Montalk, who was a semi-finalist in both pageants.
