= Tania Dawson =

New Zealand actress, singer and beauty pageant titleholder

- Born: Tania Pauline Dawson; 2 January 1993 (age 33); Waiuku, New Zealand
- Occupations: Actress, model, High School teacher
- Height: 1.65 m (5 ft 5 in)
- Beauty pageant titleholder
- Title: Miss New Zealand 2016
- Years active: 2005–present
- Hair colour: Brown
- Eye colour: Brown
- Major competitions: Miss New Zealand 2016 (Winner); Miss Universe 2016 (Unplaced)

Tania Pauline Dawson (born 2 January 1993) is a New Zealand actress, singer, teacher, model and beauty pageant titleholder who won Miss New Zealand 2016. She represented New Zealand at Miss Universe 2016.

== Personal life ==
Dawson was born and raised in Waiuku. Her mother is a Filipino from Santa Maria, Pangasinan. Dawson completed a Bachelor of Arts double major in drama and film/television and media studies from the University of Auckland, where she also received a graduate diploma in secondary teaching.

She is currently working as a media studies and drama teacher at Southern Cross Campus.

== Acting career ==
Dawson worked with many stars such as Murray Edmond, Maya Dalziel, Sally Stockwell and Mike Edwards. She usually plays in Short Films.

== Pageantry ==
=== Miss New Zealand 2016 ===
On 3 September 2016, during the final night, Dawson was crowned Miss New Zealand 2016 and competed at Miss Universe 2016 in the Philippines.

=== Miss Universe 2016 ===
Dawson represented New Zealand at Miss Universe 2016 but Unplaced.

Awards and achievements
Preceded by Samantha McClung	Miss New Zealand; 2016	Succeeded by Harlem-Cruz Ihaia
