= Priyani Puketapu =

New Zealand journalist and model

- Born: 27 December 1990 (age 35); Wellington, New Zealand
- Height: 5 ft 8 in (1.73 m)
- Beauty pageant titleholder
- Title: Miss Horowhenua 2008; Miss Wellington 2010; Miss New Zealand 2011
- Hair color: Brown

Priyani Puketapu (born 27 December 1990) is a New Zealand journalist, model and beauty pageant titleholder who was crowned Miss Universe New Zealand 2011, representing Wellington. There was subsequently controversy, with claims that some of the judges had been pressured to select a blonde. She represented New Zealand at the Miss Universe 2011 pageant in Brazil. Puketapu had previously competed for the Miss Universe New Zealand title in 2009 where she was placed first runner-up.

Puketapu did not make it into the top 16 to quality for the finals of the Miss Universe 2011 competition. Puketapu, of Te Āti Awa descent, is a Wellington-based journalism student. She finished Horowhenua College in 2008.

Awards and achievements
| Preceded by Ria van Dyke | Miss New Zealand; 2011 | Succeeded by Avianca Böhm |
