= Te Apiti =

Te Apiti may refer to:

- Manawatū Gorge
- Te Āpiti Wind Farm

== See also ==
- Āpiti
