= Ānaha Te Rāhui =

Ngati Tarawhai leader, carver, assessor

Ānaha Kēpa Te Rāhui (1822 – 30 September 1913) also known as Ānaha Mātao, was a notable Māori tribal leader, carver and assessor of New Zealand. In the 1860s, he led the Ngāti Tarāwhai iwi during the New Zealand Wars. He was born at Lake Okataina, New Zealand. As a carver, Te Rāhui is known for carving the meeting houses at Rangitihi and Tokopikowhakahau in 1878.
