= Amora Hotel (New Zealand) =

Empty hotel in Wellington, New Zealand

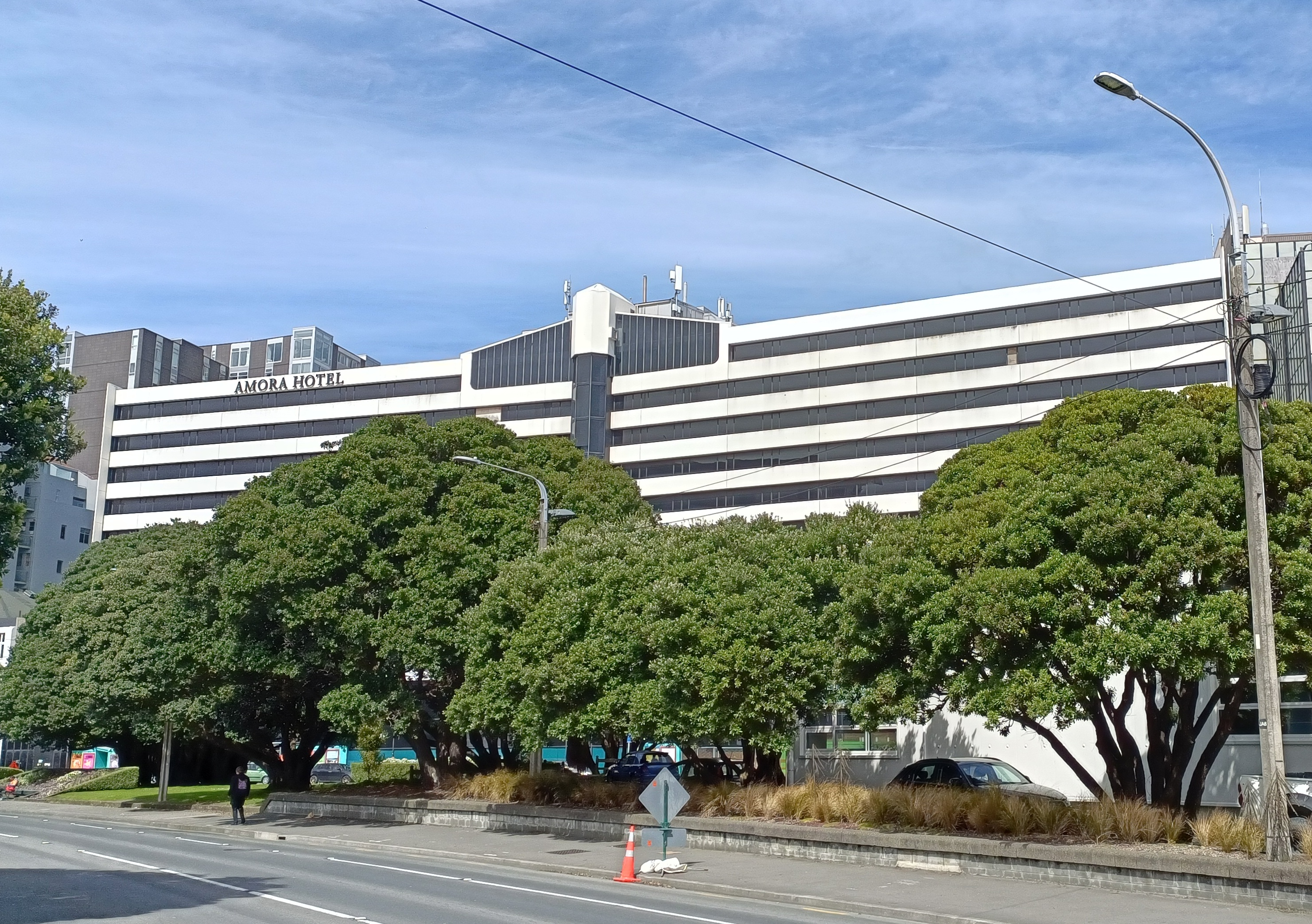
- Amora Hotel in 2023
- Interactive map of the Amora Hotel area

General information
- Location: Wakefield Street, Wellington, New Zealand
- Coordinates: 41.2909°S 174.7789°E
- Closed: 2017

Other information
- Number of rooms: 192

The Amora Hotel is a building in Wellington, New Zealand, that was closed in 2017 following the 2016 Kaikōura earthquake. The four-star hotel had 192 rooms. There are plans to redevelop it into a new hotel.

== History ==
The hotel was built in the 1980s and called the Plaza International. It became the Duxton Hotel in the 1990s, changing its name again in 2011 when it was bought by the Amora Group and refurbished. After the building was damaged in the 2016 Kaikōura earthquake, it was required by the Wellington City Council to have "invasive" engineering testing done; 71 other buildings were also required to be tested. The hotel was closed in May 2017 for refurbishment. In 2018 it was below 34 per cent of the New Building Standard, making it legally earthquake-prone.

The building was previously connected to the Michael Fowler Centre car park by a footbridge over Wakefield Street. The bridge was built in the 1980s in a postmodernist style and was closed c. 2011 but the Wellington City Council reportedly does not know why. After the hotel was closed in 2017, the bridge became useless. It started being used by rough sleepers and graffiti artists and was used for anti-social behaviour that caused the need for repairs. Following the closure the bridge was also used for illegal access the hotel and the neighbouring Pringle House, which was also closed due to seismic issues. The bridge was demolished in July 2025.

In November 2018 Prime Property Group bought the hotel building with the intention of restoring it. In 2021 the group described plans to upgrade the building to 130 per cent of the New Building Standard and open it with a new five-star hotel. They estimated that it would open in 2024. This did not happen however and the property was bought by Precinct Properties in 2023 for $15 million.
