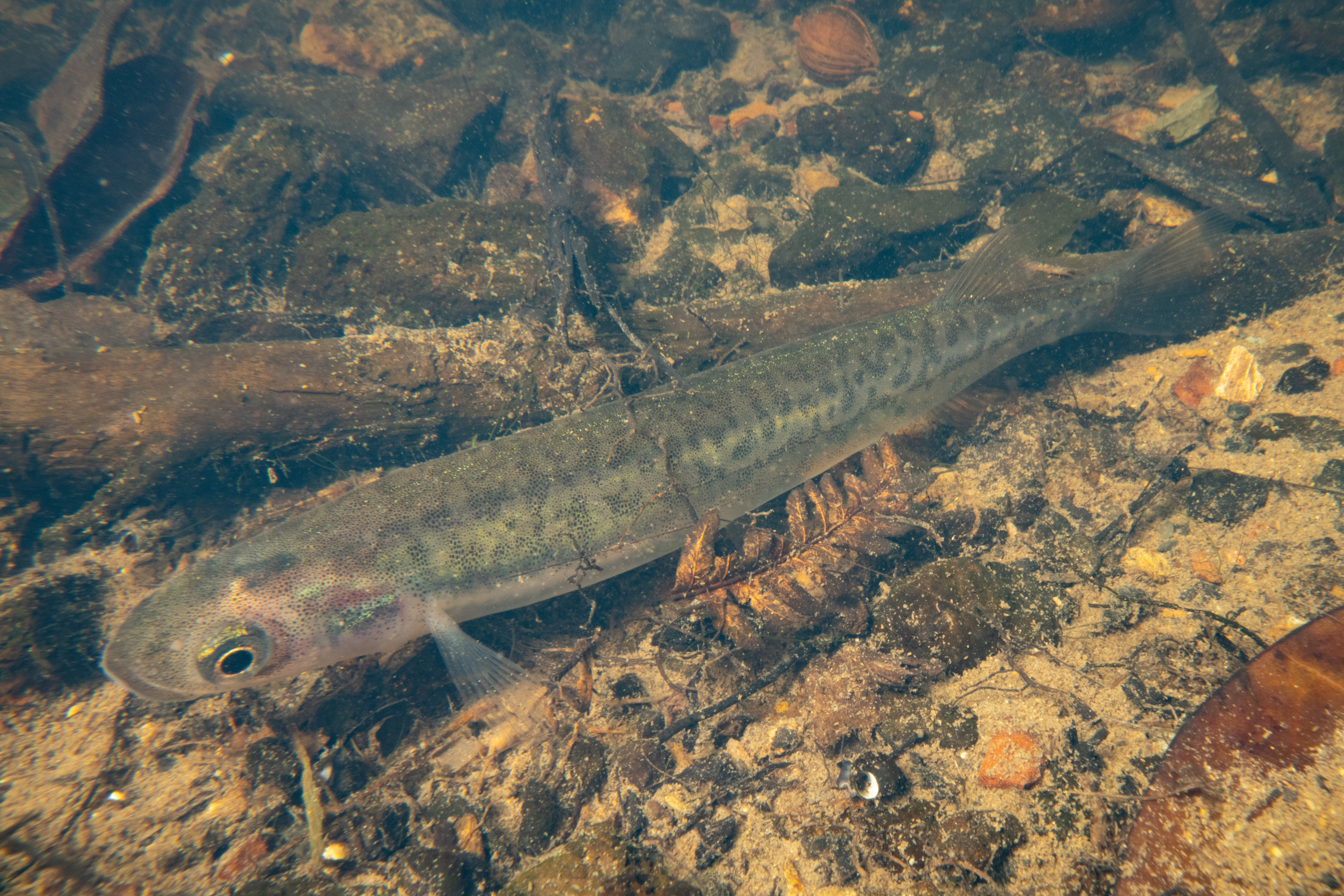

Conservation status
- Least Concern (IUCN 3.1)

- Nationally Vulnerable (NZ TCS)

Scientific classification
- Kingdom: Animalia
- Phylum: Chordata
- Class: Actinopterygii
- Division: Teleostei
- Order: Galaxiiformes
- Family: Galaxiidae
- Genus: Galaxias
- Species: G. maculatus

Binomial name
- Galaxias maculatus (Jenyns, 1842)

Synonyms
- Galaxias usitatus McDowall, 1967; Galaxias maculatus Stokell, 1966; Galaxias parrishi Stokell, 1964; Galaxias variegatus Lahille, 1923; Galaxias nebulosa Macleay, 1881; Galaxias coppingeri Günther, 1881; Galaxias cylindricus Castelnau, 1872; Galaxias delicatulus Castelnau, 1872; Galaxias amaenus Castelnau, 1872; Galaxias obtusus Klunzinger, 1872; Galaxias versicolor Castelnau, 1872; Galaxias waterhousei Krefft, 1868; Galaxias waterhousei Kreft, 1868; Galaxias waterhousi Krefft, 1868; Galaxias pseudoscriba McCoy, 1867; Mesites forsteri Kner, 1867; Galaxias krefftii Günther, 1866; Galaxias punctatus Günther, 1866; Mesites gracillimus Canestrini, 1864; Galaxias minutus Philippi, 1858; Galaxias punctulatus Philippi, 1858; Galaxias scriba Valenciennes, 1846; Mesites maculatus Jenyns, 1842; Mesites alpinus Jenyns, 1842; Galaxias alpinus (Jenyns, 1842); Mesites attenuatus Jenyns, 1842

= Common galaxias =

Species of fish

The common galaxias (Galaxias maculatus) or inanga (from the Māori īnanga or īnaka) is a species of ray-finned fish from the family Galaxiidae that is widespread in the Southern Hemisphere. It is migratory, living in fresh water but spawning at river mouths, spending the first six months of its life at sea, and returning en masse in spring. Its vernacular names include cowfish, jollytail, common jollytail, eel gudgeon, inaka, native trout, pulangi, puye, slippery tarki, spotted minnow, Falklands minnow and whitebait.

== Description ==
Common galaxias is a slim, narrow fish with a mottled, spotty pattern, iridescent silver eyes, undersides and gill covers, and some individuals have an iridescent green stripe along the top of their bodies which can be intermittently seen as they swim. Their specific name maculatus ("spotted") comes from the pattern of dark-mottled, leopard-like spots on an olive-brown background along their upper bodies. This pattern ranges from very subtle to quite bold. Common galaxias have slightly forked tails, unlike other most other galaxiids, which have square tails. Fully grown adults typically range from 8 to 11 cm (3.1 to 4.3 in) in length, with an average of 10 cm (4 in). The maximum reported length is 19 cm (7.5 in).

== Distribution and habitat ==
Common galaxias are one of the most widely distributed freshwater fish in the world. They inhabit Chile (35–55°S), Patagonia, Argentina, the Falkland Islands, some Pacific Islands such as New Caledonia, New Zealand, coastal streams in south-eastern Australia, Tasmania, and southwest Western Australia and numerous waterfilled cenotes and caves in south-eastern South Australia.

They are commonly found in small schools or shoals in slow-moving water, but can be more solitary in swifter streams. Adults are mainly found in still or slow-moving water in the lower parts of coastal streams and rivers, or around the edges of lagoons; they can tolerate a wide range of natural conditions. If oxygen levels are low as a result of eutrophication, they can jump out of the water (emerse) and take up oxygen through their skin as a last resort. A study by New Zealand's NIWA found that inanga have a high tolerance to turbid water, with an LC50 of between 17,500 and 21,000 NTU. They need access to riparian vegetation for spawning, and usually live in river systems with access to the sea, as their larval stage is marine. They tend to be found in lower-elevation streams as, unlike other species of Galaxias, they cannot climb past waterfalls.

Common galaxias can become land-locked (such as in five lakes in Northland, New Zealand), feeding and breeding in large beds of reeds.

== Life history ==
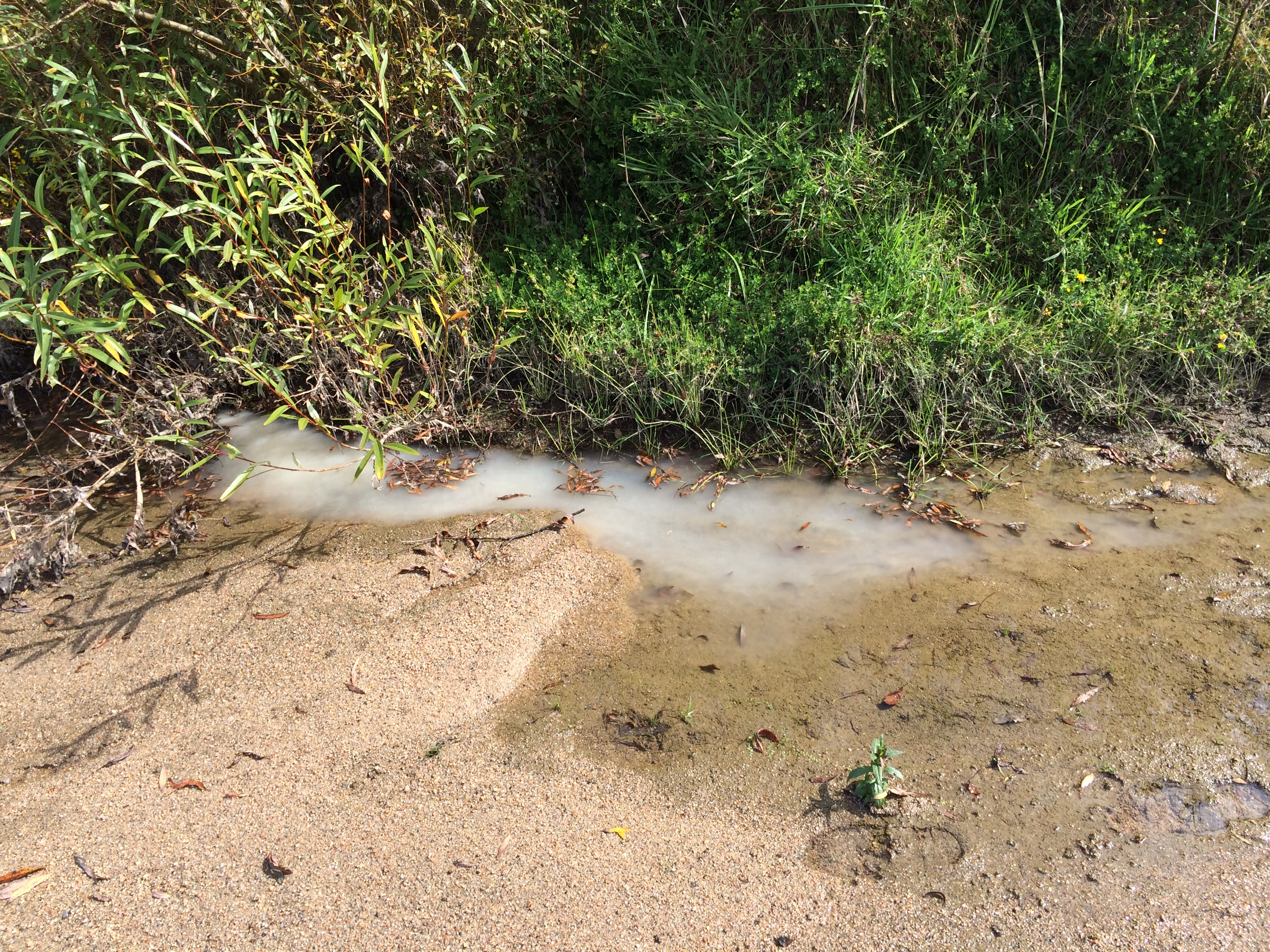
The milky white colour of the water is from male sperm following spawning.

This species is usually considered amphidromous, a particular type of diadromy meaning that reproduction occurs in fresh water and larval growth occurs in the sea.

=== Reproduction ===
Adult fish typically reach sexual maturity at one year and spawning is triggered by changes in day length and temperature. Unless landlocked within a lake, the common galaxias spawns mainly in autumn during spring tides in the tidally influenced reaches of rivers and streams but spawning in winter and spring has occurred. The eggs are laid en masse amongst flooded riparian vegetation by females. Male fish then release sperm into the water and the eggs are fertilised externally.

This type of spawning is called polygynandry. Eggs remain attached to the vegetation as the tide recedes. Two types of reproductive strategy occur: the most common is a 'boom bust' strategy whereby spawning occurs in one event and is followed by death (semelparity), or much more rarely spawning occurs in multiple years before death iteroparity.

=== Egg development ===
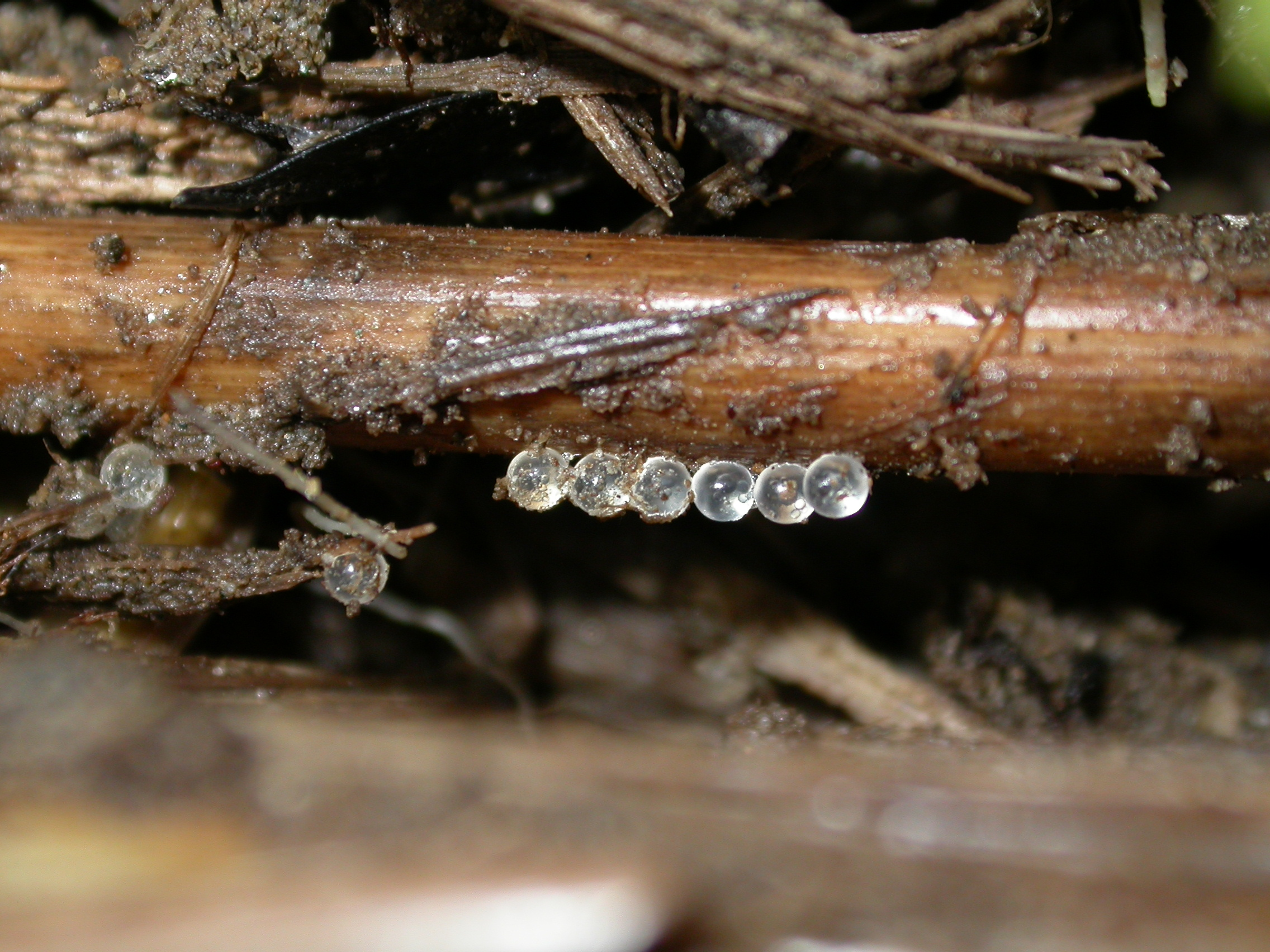
Inanga eggs adhered to a grass stem

Eggs (about 1 mm diameter) develop at the base of vegetation for 2–4 weeks. Environmental conditions in the vegetation (particularly temperature and humidity) are critical for successful egg development. Egg mortality occurs from excess exposure to sunlight, predation from mice and spiders, grazing and trampling by livestock, mowing of bankside vegetation in urban areas, and flooding. The following spring tide floods the eggs stimulating them to hatch.

=== Marine life ===
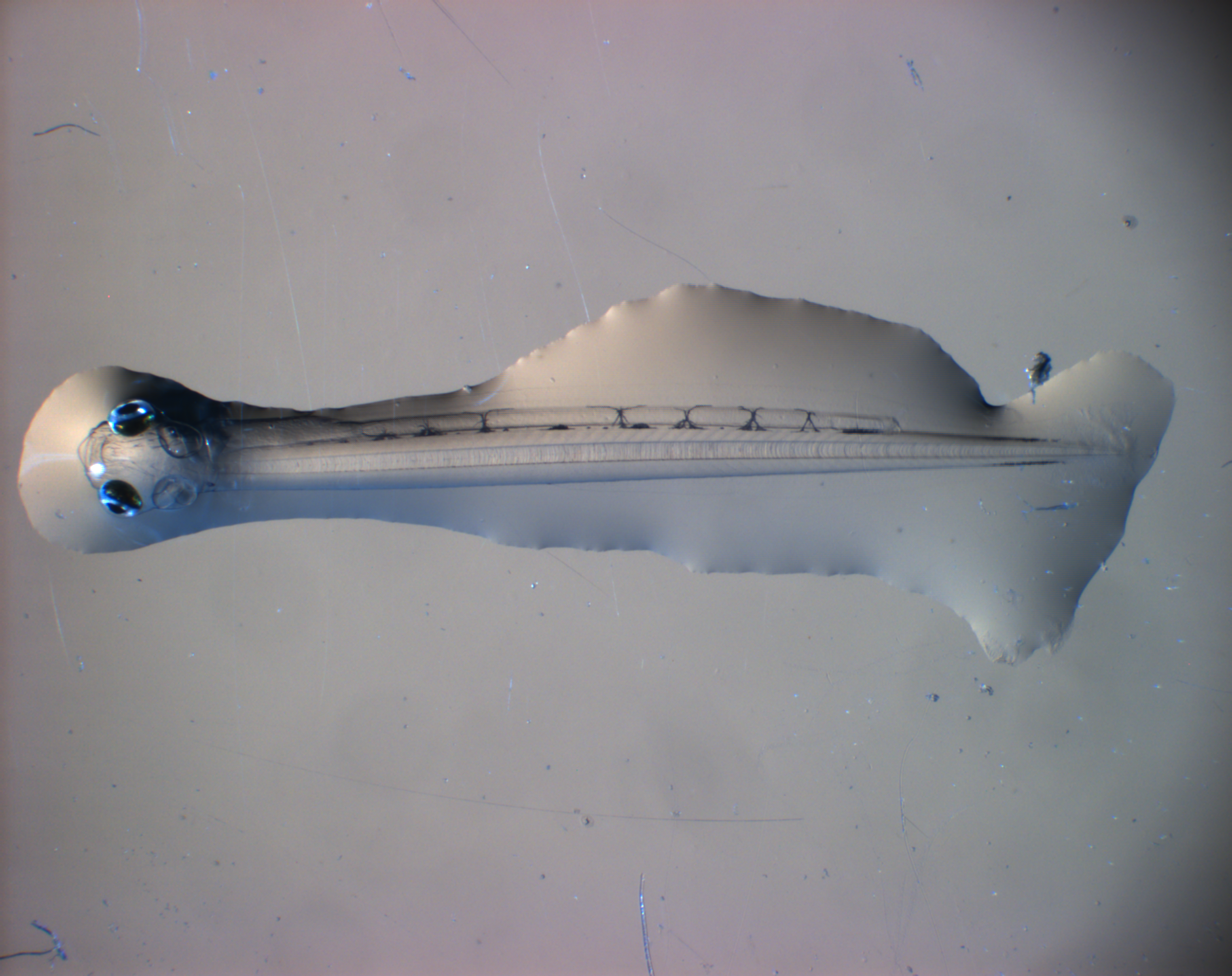
A newly hatched G. maculatus larva

After hatching, the 7-mm-long larvae are swept out to sea and spend 3–6 months in the marine environment. This phase of their lifecycle is little understood, as the larvae are small, transparent, and difficult to locate. The speed and direction of ocean currents play an important role in their dispersal; temperature and food availability are also important in determining how long they spend at sea. This marine dispersal phase is a critical part of the common galaxias's lifecycle, because it gives larvae from different populations or rivers the opportunity to 'connect'.

When the juveniles are sufficiently grown, about 30–55 mm in length, they migrate back into fresh water. The juveniles form large shoals as they move through estuaries. Some of their life is spent in the lower reaches of rivers, where they metamorphose, before spending their adult life in suitable freshwater habitat. Some individuals return to the river they were born in (natal homing), but most return to rivers other than their birth site.

=== Freshwater life ===
Following metamorphosis, adult spend around 6 months in fresh water, where they gain sufficient growth and energy to begin investing in reproduction. Males generally reach sexual maturity earlier and at a smaller size than females.

==== Parasites ====
In New Zealand, Deretrema philippae (=Limnoderetrema minutum) is known to parasitise the intestine (and possibly gall bladder) of the common galaxias. Similarly, the intestinal parasite Steganoderma szidati has been reported from this species' Argentinian population. These are digenean flatworms.

=== Fishing ===
The juveniles are caught as whitebait while moving upstream and are much valued as a delicacy, leading to their protection with controlled fishing seasons to preserve adult populations. They are fished commercially in New Zealand, Chile, and Argentina, but the last Australian commercial fishery closed in Tasmania in the 1970s.

Some jurisdictions permit fishing of the adults, but again under regulation or licence to preserve the adult population, but others ban it altogether unless the fisher belongs to an indigenous people (e.g., New Zealand Māori). For instance, in Tasmania, the adult common galaxias may only be caught using a pole of a specified maximum size (1 m).

== Conservation ==
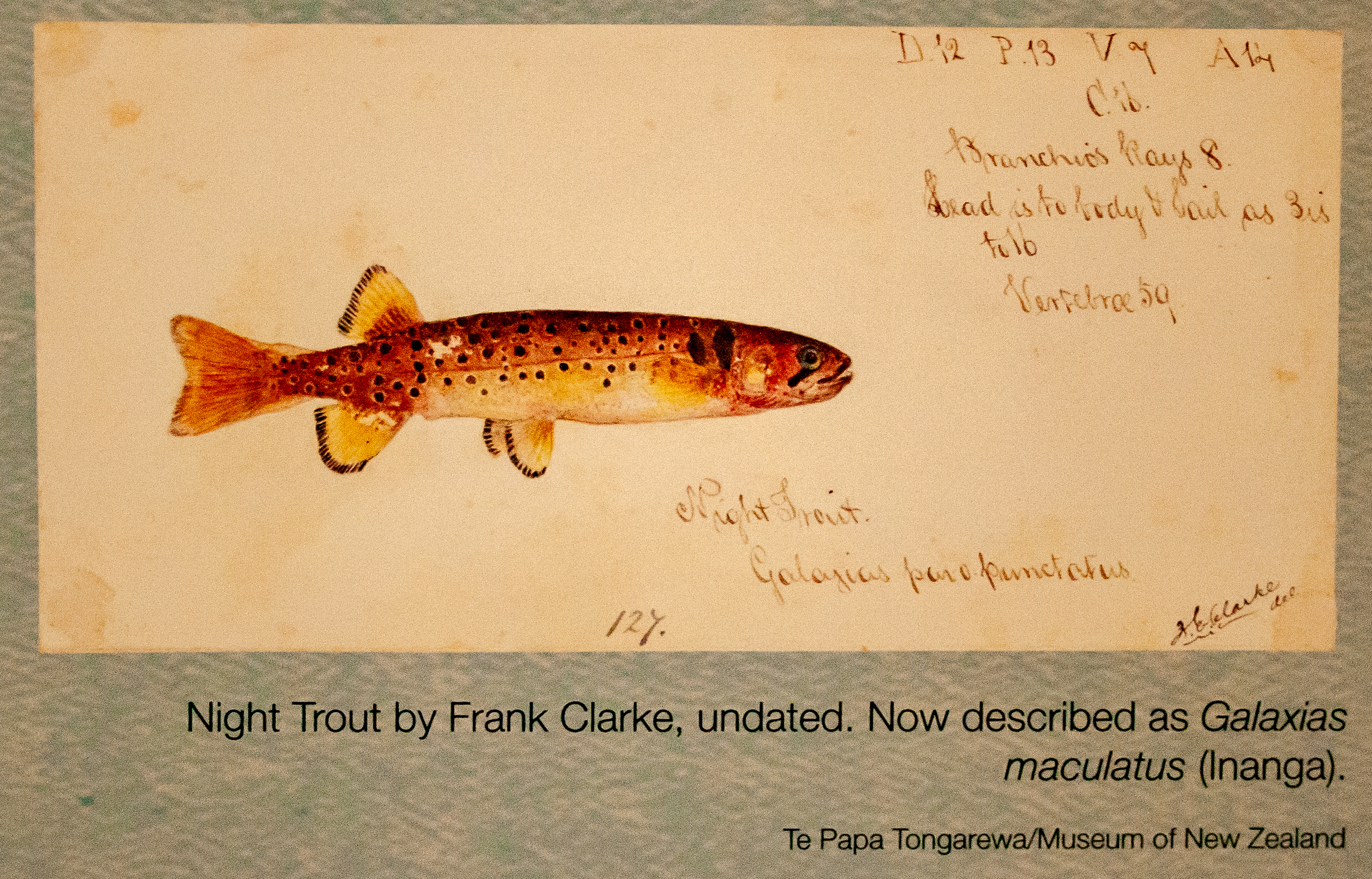
Inanga on the drawing of Frank Edward Clarke

Galaxiid species are, in general, threatened by human activities such as intensive agriculture and land change use. These activities have removed vegetation from stream banks that are needed for spawning to protect eggs from the sun. The increased nutrient input into streams from farming can lead to eutrophication. In New Zealand, their conservation status is declining, mostly because of habitat loss and degradation.

As adults, common galaxias eat insects, crustaceans, and molluscs. This is the same diet as introduced trout, which not only compete for food, but also readily eat them. In areas where trout have become naturalised, common galaxias are scarce. Common galaxias, therefore, are mostly found in stretches of streams and rivers that are less suitable for introduced trout.

=== Restoration ===
As of 2023, under the New Zealand Threat Classification System, this species is listed as "Nationally Vulnerable" with the qualifiers of "Conservation Dependent", "Data Poor: Size", "Range Restricted" and "Secure Overseas?". In parts of New Zealand, this species' spawning habitat has become degraded due to activities related to agriculture, urbanisation, and land-use change. This creates sink populations in rivers as adult fish have nowhere suitable to lay their eggs and the majority of eggs die. Because these sink rivers produce no eggs or larvae, a gap is created during marine dispersal. No opportunities exist for the exchange of larvae from these sink populations with other populations. However, these sink populations can receive larvae that were born in different rivers. They will not be able to successfully reproduce and the sink cycle continues.

Innovative methods to restore the riparian spawning habitat include using straw bales as a temporary replacement for vegetation. Straw bales provide the same conditions and physical structure as natural vegetation, enabling the eggs to develop successfully. This method ensures that eggs and larvae are produced, and that each river is a source of larvae. Exclusion of livestock and fencing of the bank-side vegetation is also an effective method to encourage regrowth of suitable vegetation. Restoration of the spawning habitat helps to maintain connectivity between larvae from different rivers during marine dispersal.
