= Lake Ōkataina =

Volcanic crater lake in New Zealand

- Lake Okataina
- Te Moana i kataina ā Te Rangitakaroro (Māori)
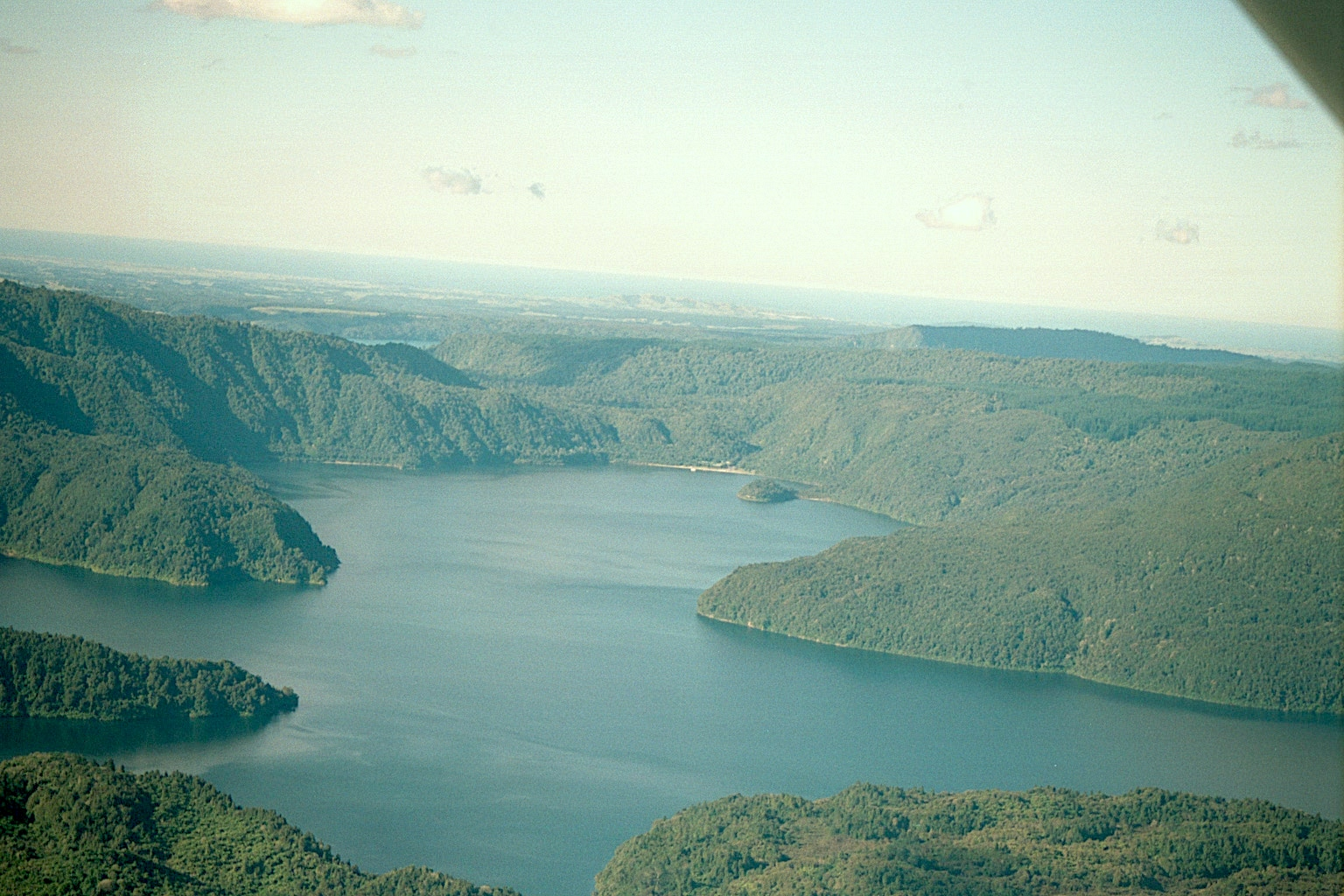
- Aerial view from the south

- Location within North Island
- Interactive map of Lake Ōkataina
- Location: Bay of Plenty, North Island
- Coordinates: 38°07′S 176°25′E
- Type: crater lake
- Primary inflows: Herupapaoa Stream, Pukahu Stream
- Primary outflows: subsurface
- Catchment area: 59.8 km^{2} (23.1 sq mi)
- Basin countries: New Zealand
- Max. length: 6.2 km (3.9 mi)
- Max. width: 5.0 km (3.1 mi)
- Surface area: 10.7 km^{2} (4.1 sq mi)
- Average depth: 44.0 m (144.4 ft)
- Max. depth: 78.5 m (258 ft)
- Surface elevation: 309.1 m (1,014 ft)

Lake Ōkataina (also spelled Okataina; Māori: Te Moana i kataina ā Te Rangitakaroro or Ōkataina) is the northernmost and largest of four smaller lakes lying between Lake Rotorua and Lake Tarawera in the Bay of Plenty Region of New Zealand's North Island. The others are Lake Rotokākahi (Green Lake), Lake Tikitapu (Blue Lake), and Lake Ōkareka. All lie within the Ōkataina caldera, along its western edge.

== Geography ==
Unlike many other lakes in the region, Lake Ōkataina is completely encircled by native forest. Over the past 30 years, the level of the lake has risen and fallen in a range of about 5 metres. The mean autumn lake level is 309.1 m (1,014 ft).

The lake can be accessed by road via Hinehopu on the southern shores of Lake Rotoiti. At the end of the road there is a large sandy beach, a massive grassed area and the privately owned Okataina Lodge. Due to changes in the surface level of the lake, the lodge jetty has at times been either completely submerged or left high and dry.

On its south-western arm is a small island, Motuwhetero Island.

=== Water Flow ===
The lake is feed by multiple unnamed and often transient streams with a total catchment precipitation inflow average of 3,841 L/s (135.6 cu ft/s). The only named streams that empty into the lake are the Herupapaoa Stream and Pukahu Streams. The Te Rereoterangi Stream joins the permanent Herupapaoa Stream before it enters the lake. The lake has no surface outflow and a outflow to Lake Tarawera of 399 L/s (14.1 cu ft/s) has been estimated.

=== Geology ===
It is located in the Ōkataina Caldera and some of its south-eastern shore has discoloured hot water sources in the lake. The western shore is underlaid by Mamaku ignimbrite from the Rotorua Caldera eruption of 240,000 years ago. The rest of the lake catchment has rhyolite formations from Ōkataina eruptions.

After the 1886 eruption of Mount Tarawera the lake level increased, to a maximum height about 1930 which dropped to present levels after the 1931 Hawke's Bay earthquake. The lake is now about 10 m (33 ft) above its pre 1886 level.

== Culture ==
The New Zealand Ministry for Culture and Heritage gives a translation of "place of laughter" for Ōkataina. According to traditional accounts the name was given by the rangatira Te Rangitakaroro, who lived at Te Koutu, since he was once paralysed with laughter at a joke while sitting on a rock near the lake. The lake and surrounds were occupied by the Ngāti Tarāwhai iwi.

Te Koutu Pā was located on the north-east shore of Lake Ōkataina. The carved entrance gate, is to be found in the Auckland War Memorial Museum.

Because of war raids before 1886, and flooding after 1886, the previous sites of occupation on the lake shore were abandoned by the Māori Ngāti Tarāwhai inhabitants. Both a drowned Pā and shrine has been found. A palisade post found under water near Motuwhetero Island confirms that the older low lake level had been present for at least about 100 years before the 1886 eruption. Rock art in the form of a canoe in red ochre has been described.

== Ecology ==
The lake is surrounded by pristine virgin native forest and has good fishing for rainbow trout.

The area around the Okataina Lodge is heavily populated by tammar wallabies introduced from Australia in the 19th century. It is known that these have impacted on the seedling layer of the forest, drastically reducing seedling density and diversity, and causing the disappearance of preferred food species. The local red deer prevent seedlings from maturing into saplings and the combined effect has been a profound depletion of the forest under storey.

Its trophic level index was 2.7 in 2014, being the lowest of the Ōkataina Caldera lakes.
