= Ngāti Tarāwhai =

Māori iwi (tribe) in Aotearoa (New Zealand)

- Iwi (tribe) in Māoridom
- Rohe (region): Bay of Plenty
- Waka (canoe): Arawa

Ngāti Tarāwhai is a Māori iwi of the Rotorua area of New Zealand, and a member of the Te Arawa confederation of tribes. The iwi's rohe (tribal area) covers the western shore of Lake Ōkataina.

The tribe is named for Tarāwhai, a descendant of Ngātoro-i-rangi, who took control of Lake Ōkataina from the Ngāti Kauupoko hapū of Ngāti Rangitihi and defended it from an attack by the Ngāti Te Takinga hapū of Ngāti Pikiao.

The tribe's carving has been noted historically. As the iwi allied with the government, their lands were never confiscated, and they were able to maintain their lineage of tohunga whakairo (master carvers). One of the greatest carvers known today, Wero Tāroi, who was possibly the first Māori carver to incorporate steel chisels, was of Ngāti Tarāwhai.

Te Arawa FM is the radio station of Te Arawa iwi. It was established in the early 1980s and became a charitable entity in November 1990. The station underwent a major transformation in 1993, becoming Whanau FM. One of the station's frequencies was taken over by Mai FM in 1998; the other became Pumanawa FM before later reverting to Te Arawa FM. It is available on 89.0 FM in Rotorua.

== See also ==
- List of Māori iwi
