= Tarawera =

Tarawera may refer to several locations in the Bay of Plenty, New Zealand:

- Tarawera (New Zealand electorate), extant from 1978 to 1996
- Mount Tarawera, volcano that last erupted in 1886
- Lake Tarawera
- Tarawera River, flows from Lake Tarawera
- Tarawera Falls, on the Tarawera River
