= Ngāti Rangitihi =

Māori iwi (tribe) in New Zealand

- Iwi (tribe) in Māoridom
- Rohe (region): Bay of Plenty
- Website: www.rangitihi.com

Ngāti Rangitihi is a Māori iwi (tribe) of New Zealand, based in the Bay of Plenty.

The tribe is part of the greater Te Arawa confederation of tribes. Nga pumanawa e waru o Te Arawa (the eight beating hearts of Te Arawa) derives from the eight children of the eponymous Rangitihi. From Rangitihi come the main tribal groups of Te Arawa, but Ngāti Rangitihi take their name through a multitude of intertribal marriages in which Ngati Rangitihi people connect to the eight beating hearts of Te Arawa.

The recognised rohe (tribal area) of Ngāti Rangitihi was submitted to the Waitangi Tribunal in evidence during an urgent hearing in February 2002. It was not challenged by the legal Counsel for the Crown, Tuwharetoa ki Kawerau or Ngāti Awa who were all present at the time. It extends from the east side of the Tarawera River mouth to Otamarakau, inland to Lake Rotoehu, through Lake Rotomā and through Lake Ōkataina and Lake Tarawera. South into the Kaingaroa Forest. East including the western third of the Matahina Block. Pokohu and Putauaki and out to the coast following the line of the Tarawera River.

== History ==
=== Early history ===
Ngāti Rangitihi history is carved into the pole beside of the Rangiaohia wharenui at the Matatā Pā and at Tamatekapua wharenui at Te Papaiouru Marae at Rotorua, Ngāti Rangitihi is the carved figure at the top of the pole, the 8 beating hearts are below Rangitihi. Their hapū, Ngāti Mahi and Ngāti Tionga are the recognised hapū of Ngāti Rangitihi today.

The Ngāti Tionga hapū has occupied (Ahika) Otamarora (Matatā) since 1700, under the chiefs Rohi, Tewhareiti, Tionga, Tangihia Tionga and Porione Tangihia. Pre-1928, carvings were green. The whare nui was named Tionga.

=== Modern history ===
The Tionga Marae was located on Lot 5, Arawa Street, Matatā, where it was owned by members Tangihia family. In the late 1880s Ngāti Mahi renovated the Tionga marae, replacing the thatch with an iron roof and the raupō wall panels with sawn timber. In 1928 a tornado lifted the marae building up and carried it to its present location. It was renamed the Rangiaohia Whare nui and has been maintained by Ngāti Rangitihi ever since.

The first and original Rangitihi house belonged to the Ngāti Rangiwewehi chief Te Rangitewhata and stood at Puhirua pā on the shores of Lake Rotorua. The second belonged to Te Waata Taranui of Ngāti Pikiao and is currently in the Auckland museum. The third stands at Te Taheke, on the shores of Lake Rotoiti and is in use to this day.

== Media ==
=== Te Arawa FM ===
Te Arawa FM is the radio station of Te Arawa iwi. It was established in the early 1980s and became a charitable entity in November 1990. The station underwent a major transformation in 1993, becoming Whanau FM. One of the station's frequencies was taken over by Mai FM in 1998; the other became Pumanawa FM before later reverting to Te Arawa FM. It is available on 89.0 FM in Rotorua.

== See also ==
- List of Māori iwi
