= Waaka (disambiguation) =

Tāmati Wāka Nene (1780s–1871) was a Māori chief of the Ngāpuhi iwi.

Waaka may also refer to:

- Waga sculpture, a type of Ethiopian memorial carving
- Cheryl Moana Waaka (born 1970), female New Zealand rugby union player
- Gugi Waaka (1938–2014), New Zealand musical entertainer
- Maureen Waaka (1942–2013), Miss New Zealand 1962
- Te Kari Waaka (1916–1991), New Zealand Ringatu minister
