= Hamiora =

Hamiora or Hāmiora could be both a masculine given name and a middle name. Notable people with this name include:

- Hāmiora Mangakāhia (1838–1918), Maori chief
- Hamiora Pere (died 1869), New Zealand execution victim
- Hamiora Tumutara Te Tihi-o-te-whenua Pio (1814–1901), New Zealand historian
- Hamiora Wiremu Maioha (1888–1963), New Zealand interpreter
- Eruera Hamiora Tumutara (c. 1859–1930), New Zealand bishop
