= Eruera =

Eruera is a given name. It is a Māori transliteration of the name Edward. Notable people with the name include:

- Eruera Hamiora Tumutara (c. 1859–1930), New Zealand Ringatū bishop
- Eruera Love (1905–1942), New Zealand Army commander
- Eruera Maihi Patuone (c. 1764–1872), Māori chief and leader
- Eruera Riini Mānuera (1895–1990), New Zealand tribal leader
- Eruera Tirikātene (1895–1967), New Zealand politician
