= Gillian Cowlishaw =

New Zealand-Australian anthropologist

Gillian Cowlishaw FASSA
- Born: 1934 (age 91–92); Otakiri, Bay of Plenty, New Zealand
- Spouse(s): Brian Cowlishaw, Hal Wootten

Academic background
- Education: University of Sydney
- Thesis: Women's realm: a study of socialization, sexuality and reproduction among Australian Aborigines (1979)

Academic work
- Discipline: Anthropology
- Sub-discipline: Aboriginal Australian culture and people
- Institutions: Charles Sturt University; Australian National University; University of Sydney; University of Technology Sydney

Gillian Cowlishaw FASSA (née Jessup; born 1934) is a New Zealand-born anthropologist, known for her ethnographic research on Indigenous Australians.

== Early life and education ==
Cowlishaw was born Gillian Jessup in 1934 in the rural area of Otakiri, near Edgecumbe in the Bay of Plenty Region, New Zealand, and grew up on her parents' dairy farm with three siblings. She attended Otakiri School, followed by high school in Whakatāne. When she was 17, she moved to Auckland to study at Auckland Teachers' Training College.

After graduating and a year teaching in a rural school, she travelled to Italy, worked for some months in Hamburg and 18 months in London, before returning to NZ via the Soviet Union and China. She married an English scientist and lived in Sydney, Adelaide, and Singapore, from where she returned to Sydney with her two children.

In 1970 she enrolled as a mature age student at the University of Sydney to study psychology and anthropology, graduating in 1974 with a BA (Hons) in anthropology. Her doctorate in anthropology focussed on Aboriginal Australian women's lives, and she spent time living in southern Arnhem Land in the Northern Territory to complete field work. She completed her PhD in anthropology in 1979. She went on to teach at Charles Sturt University, Australian National University, and the University of Sydney (1992 to 1997). She was a research professor at University of Technology Sydney (from 1998 to 2005) before returning to the University of Sydney.

== Career ==
Cowlishaw's ethnographic research with Aboriginal Australians investigates local cultures, histories, and the relationship between settler colonialists and Indigenous peoples.

Cowlishaw has contributed to a number of government and community agencies. She was commissioned to write a report for the Royal Commission into Aboriginal Deaths in Custody in 1990, for the Katherine Regional Aboriginal Legal Service in 2000, and for the Northern Land Council in 2004. From 1991 to 2001 she was an editor for the journal Oceania, and from 2006 to 2008 she was president of the Australian Anthropological Society.

=== Publications ===
- Black, White or Brindle: race in rural Australia (1988) Cambridge: Cambridge University Press.
- Rednecks, Eggheads and Blackfellas: racial power and intimacy in north Australia (1999) Sydney and Michigan: Allen and Unwin.
- Blackfellas, Whitefellas and the Hidden Injuries of Race (2004) UK: Wiley-Blackwell Publishing. Awarded a Premiers Literary Award.
- The City's Outback (2009) Sydney, Australia: University of New South Wales Press.

== Other activities ==
From 2009 Cowlishaw convened the Sydney Writers' Anthropology Group (SWAG).

== Recognition and awards ==
Cowlishaw's 2004 book Blackfellas, Whitefellas and the Hidden Injuries of Race won the New South Wales Premier's Award:, the Gleebooks Prize for Critical Writing in 2005.

In 2006 the Australian Research Council awarded Cowlishaw an Australian Professorial Fellowship. She used the fellowship to research urban Aboriginal people in Sydney's western suburbs.

In 2013, she was elected a Fellow of the Academy of the Social Sciences in Australia.

== Personal life ==
Cowlishaw married first Brian Cowlishaw, and in 1991 married Hal Wootten, who died in 2021 at the age of 98.
