= Samuel Emery =

Samuel Emery may refer to:

- Samuel Anderson Emery (1814–1881), English stage actor
- Samuel Horouta Emery (1885–1967), New Zealand labourer, rugby player and businessman
