= Maata Te Taiawatea Rangitūkehu =

Maata Te Taiawatea Rangitūkehu (c. 1848/1849 – 27 June 1929) was a notable New Zealand tribal leader. Of Māori descent, she identified with the Ngāti Awa, Te Arawa and Tuhourangi iwi. She was born in Lake Tarawera, Rotorua, New Zealand in about 1848.
