= Tarawera Falls =

Coordinates: 38.163°S 176.52°E

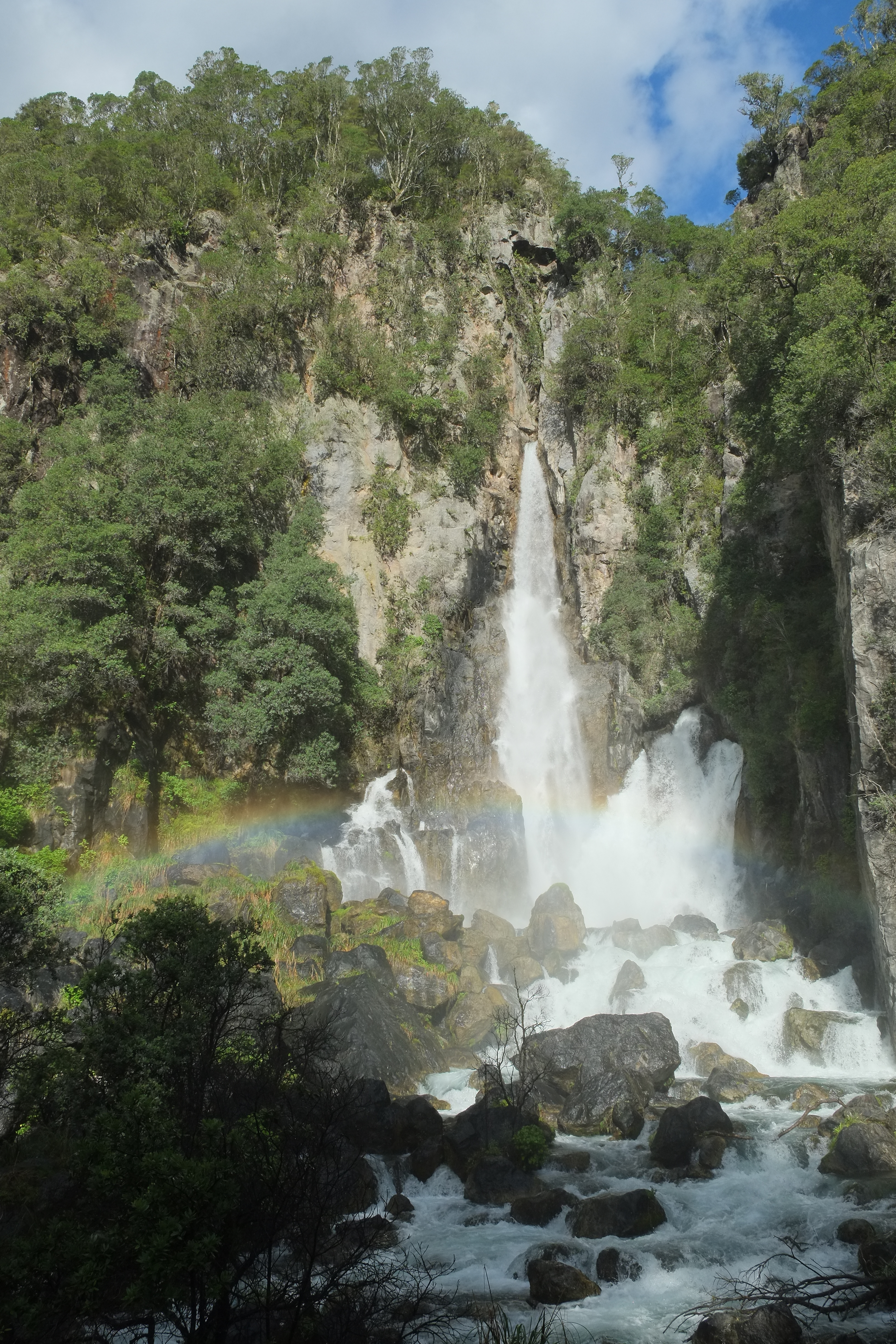
- Tarawera Falls at high flow
- Interactive map of Tarawera Falls
- Location: Bay of Plenty, New Zealand
- Type: Plunge
- Total height: 65 m (213 ft)
- Watercourse: Tarawera River
- Average flow rate: 7 m^{3}/s (250 cu ft/s)

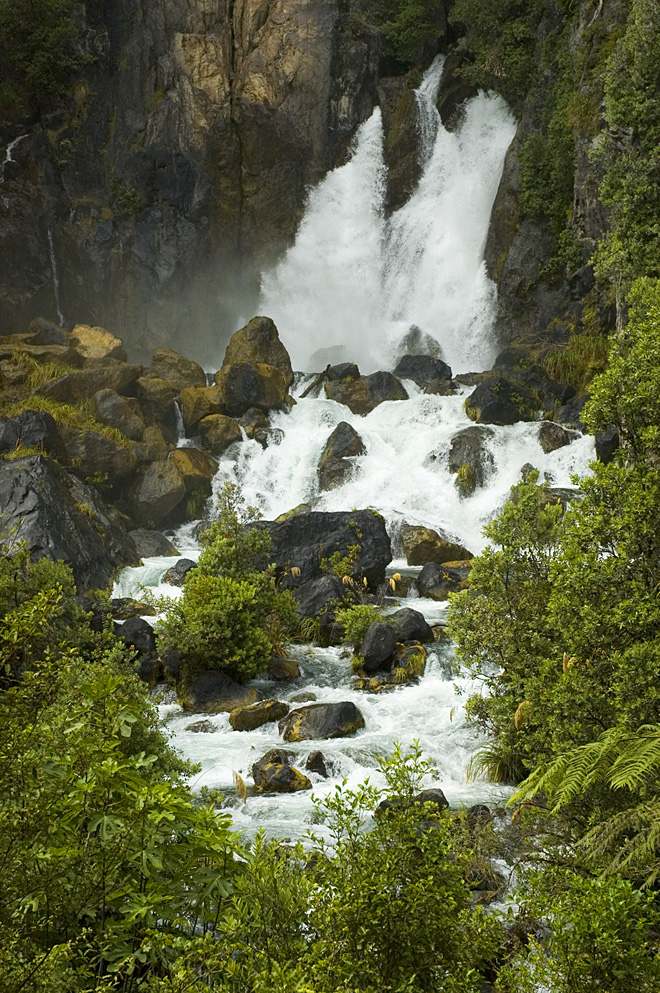
Lower part of Tarawera Falls, gushing out of fissures in the cliff.

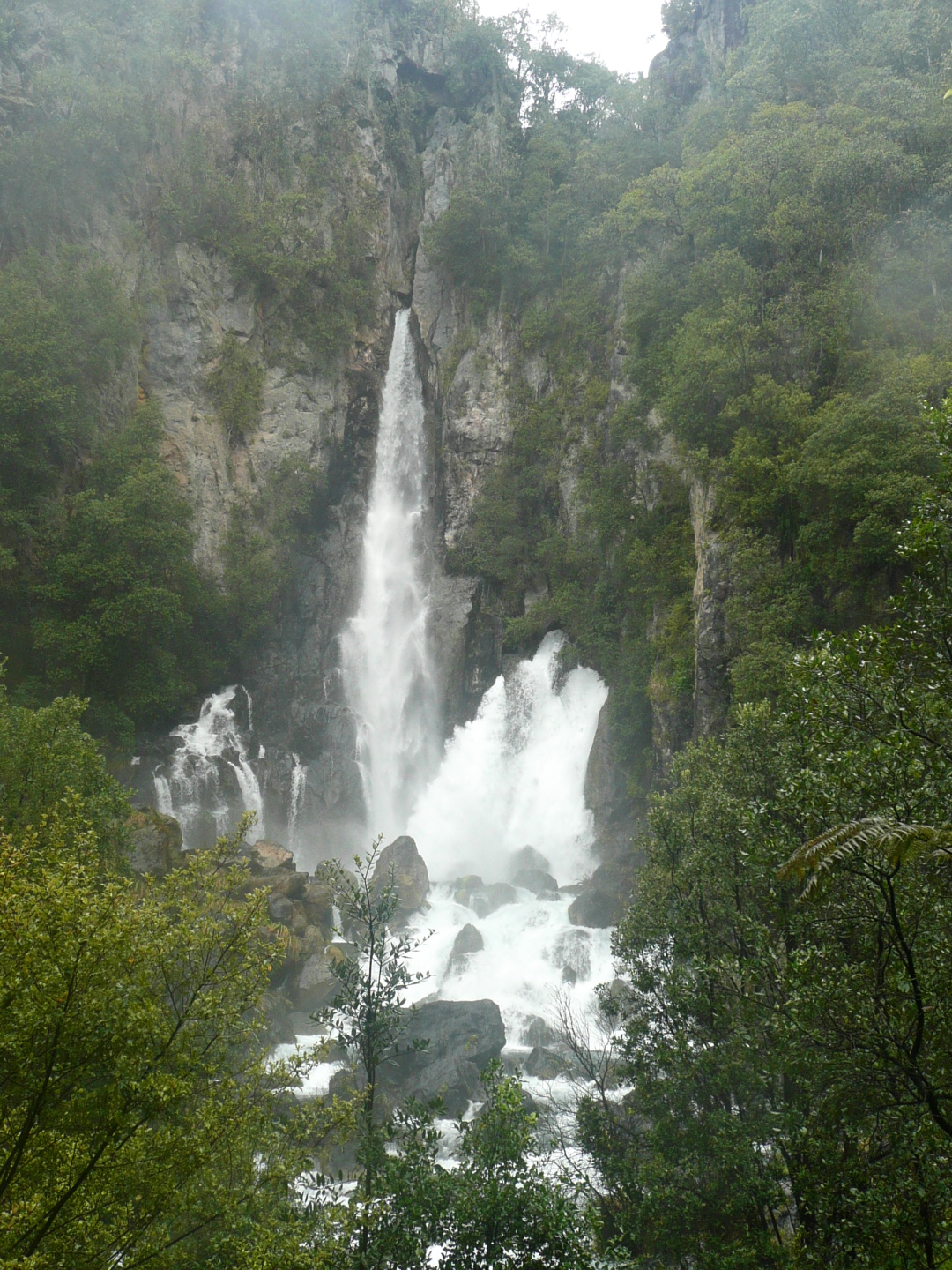
Tarawera Falls with high flow in misty rain.

Tarawera Falls is a 65 m (213 ft) high waterfall on the Tarawera River in the Bay of Plenty region in New Zealand's North Island.

The Tarawera River flows out of Lake Tarawera and across a rhyolitic lava flow that erupted from Mt Tarawera about 14,000 years ago. The river disappears about 30 metres (98 feet) back from the clifftop into flooded caves in the lava and pours out halfway up the cliff on the far side of the flow.

After rain, part of the flow passes over the top of the cliff as a 65 m (213 ft) tall companion fall.

Access is from the town of Kawerau and is a drive of about 45 minutes over unsealed roads, followed by a walk of about 20 minutes. A forestry access permit is required, available from the Information Centre in Kawerau.

== Māori history ==
The Te Arawa and Ngāti Awa tribes have traditional associations with this site. Ngāti Rangitihi, one of the eight Te Arawa tribal groups, are the current guardians of the area and consider the site of the waterfall a sacred place.

== Fauna and flora ==
The vegetation in the area has only developed since the 1886 Tarawera eruption and contains an unusual range of hybrids between pōhutukawa and rātā. Migrating eels swim as far up as the waterfall and can sometimes be seen on the western side of the falls searching for a way further upstream.

== Geology ==
The falls were formed where the 14,009 ± 155 BP Pokohu lava flow from the Waiohau eruption of Mount Tarawera covered earlier tephra deposits. Lake Tarawera's river outlet is 3 km (1.9 mi) upstream from the falls and at times of normal flow the Tarawera River progressively drains into fissures, flowing subsurface, until it emerges about mid cliff from caves in the Pokohu lava flow. The major contributor to today's amphitheatre, was likely to be the large flood that followed the lake outlet damming by events associated with the 5526 ± 145 BP Whakatane eruption. It is postulated that plunge-pool undercutting rather than kolking created the amphitheatre. Boulders down stream of the falls are up to 20 m (66 ft) in diameter reflecting the much larger size of this flood than the mere 100 times increase over normal flow of the 3 November 1904 flood at 700 m^{3}/s (25,000 cu ft/s).

== See also ==
- List of waterfalls
- List of waterfalls in New Zealand
