= Otakiri =

Rural community in Bay of Plenty Region, New Zealand

- Rural community
- Interactive map of Otakiri
- Coordinates: 37.985°S 176.765°E
- Country: New Zealand
- Region: Bay of Plenty
- Territorial authority: Whakatāne District
- Ward: Rangitāiki General Ward
- Community: Rangitāiki Community
- Electorates: East Cape; Waiariki (Māori)

Government
  - Territorial authority: Whakatāne District Council
  - Regional council: Bay of Plenty Regional Council
  - Mayor of Whakatāne: Nándor Tánczos
  - East Cape MP: Dana Kirkpatrick
  - Waiariki MP: Rawiri Waititi

Area
  - Total: 51.55 km^{2} (19.90 sq mi)

Population (2023 Census)
  - Total: 1,257
  - Density: 24.38/km^{2} (63.15/sq mi)

Otakiri (Māori: Ōtākiri) is a rural community just outside Edgecumbe, in the Whakatāne District and Bay of Plenty Region of New Zealand's North Island.

The New Zealand Ministry for Culture and Heritage gives a translation of "place of loosening or freeing from tapu" for Ōtākiri.

A dairy factory was established in the area in 1912.

The settlement was known as Tarawera until 1928.

In 2017, the Chinese company which owned rights to water from the Otakiri Springs sought planning and regulatory permission to expand its water bottling operation. Permission was granted in June 2018. Green Party cabinet minister Eugenie Sage's involvement in the decision led to a revolt within the party.

A local crowd-funded environment group appealed the decision in 2019, with support from local iwi Ngāti Awa.

== Demographics ==
Otakiri covers 51.55 km^{2} (19.90 sq mi). It is partly in the Matatā-Otakiri and partly in the Onepu Spring statistical areas.

Historical population
| Year | Pop. | ±% p.a. |
|---|---|---|
| 2006 | 1,056 | — |
| 2013 | 1,089 | +0.44% |
| 2018 | 1,257 | +2.91% |
| 2023 | 1,257 | +0.00% |
The 2006 population is for a smaller area of 50.91 km^{2}. Source:

Otakiri had a population of 1,257 in the 2023 New Zealand census, unchanged since the 2018 census, and an increase of 168 people (15.4%) since the 2013 census. There were 630 males, 624 females, and 6 people of other genders in 432 dwellings. 1.7% of people identified as LGBTIQ+. There were 252 people (20.0%) aged under 15 years, 177 (14.1%) aged 15 to 29, 618 (49.2%) aged 30 to 64, and 222 (17.7%) aged 65 or older.

People could identify as more than one ethnicity. The results were 69.2% European (Pākehā); 41.5% Māori; 2.4% Pasifika; 5.3% Asian; 1.0% Middle Eastern, Latin American and African New Zealanders (MELAA); and 2.4% other, which includes people giving their ethnicity as "New Zealander". English was spoken by 97.6%, Māori by 11.9%, and other languages by 4.8%. No language could be spoken by 1.2% (e.g. too young to talk). The percentage of people born overseas was 12.9, compared with 28.8% nationally.

Religious affiliations were 25.3% Christian, 5.5% Māori religious beliefs, 0.5% Buddhist, 1.0% New Age, and 2.1% other religions. People who answered that they had no religion were 59.2%, and 7.4% of people did not answer the census question.

Of those at least 15 years old, 138 (13.7%) people had a bachelor's or higher degree, 615 (61.2%) had a post-high school certificate or diploma, and 261 (26.0%) people exclusively held high school qualifications. 132 people (13.1%) earned over $100,000 compared to 12.1% nationally. The employment status of those at least 15 was 516 (51.3%) full-time, 162 (16.1%) part-time, and 51 (5.1%) unemployed.

== Education ==
Otakiri School is a co-educational state primary school for Year 0 to 8 students, with a roll of 159 as of July 2026.

The Otakiri School logo consists of Maori patterns and designs, and shows a pūkeko in front of a triangle, representing the nearby mountain of Putauaki (Mt Edgecumbe). The school's motto is "Learners Forever, Leading the Future".

The school was founded in 1920. It now consists of a field, sports turf, computer suite, library, hard court and several playgrounds, and uses the neighbouring Otakiri District Hall for assemblies, fundraising and school events.

The school hosts a Country Fair and a Calf-Club Day every spring and regular sports competitions. It alternates each year between a talent show and a school show.

Currently, there are four school houses:

- Walker (Yellow) - Named after BMX rider Sarah Walker
- Jackson (Green) - Named after New Zealand director Peter Jackson
- McCaw (Black) - Named after the All Black captain Richie McCaw
- Blake (Red) - Named after yachtsman Sir Peter Blake

Previously, there were five school houses:

- Te Kanawa/T.K. (Purple) - Named after New Zealand opera singer Dame Kiri Te Kanawa
- Kendall (Black) - Named after Barbara Kendall, a former New Zealand boardsailor
- Mahy (Orange) - Named after New Zealand author, Margaret Mahy
- Hillary (Green) - Named after Sir Edmund Hillary, a New Zealand mountaineer and explorer
- Blake (Red) - Named after yachtsman Sir Peter Blake
