= Matekoraha Te Peehi Jaram =

New Zealand weaver, tailor, community leader

Matekoraha Te Peehi Jaram (27 February 1902–20 September 1978) was a New Zealand weaver, tailor, and community leader. Of Māori descent, she identified with the Ngāti Awa, Ngāti Maru (Taranaki) and Ngāti Pūkeko iwi. She was born in Whiritoa, Thames/Coromandel, New Zealand on 27 February 1902.
