= Maori Volcanics Showband =

New Zealand showband musical group

- Origin: New Zealand
- Years active: 1967–2002
- Past members: Robbie Ratana; Heta Gilbert; Jessie Rawiri; Charlie Te Hau; John Rangi; Gilbert Smith; Prince Tui Teka; Billy T. James; John Nelson; Gugi Waaka; Nuki Waaka; Mahora Peters; Hector Epae; Kevin Ronganui; John (Gimick) Cameron

The Maori Volcanics Showband are a New Zealand show group that formed in 1967. The Volcanics toured widely on the cabaret circuit. The Rajon Music Group released a compilation of the band's recordings in 2002.

== Albums ==
- Maori Volcanics Showband 1967–2002 (2002)
  Disc 1
  1. "Walk Together" – Heta Gilbert (1975)
  2. "See You in September" – John Rangi (1975)
  3. "Blue Darling" – Selwyn Rawiri (1998)
  4. "In the Morning" – Billy Peters (1975)
  5. "Morning Dew" – Mahora Peters (2000)
  6. "You'll Never Find" – Robbie Ratana (1997)
  7. "Tokyo Twilight" – Billy Peters (1975)
  8. "Impressions" – Billy T. James (1975)
  9. "Splendous Thing" (1997)
  10. "Neither One of Us" – Mahora (1997)
  11. "Walk in Light" – Heta Gilbert (1975)
  12. "Those Were the Days" – Mahora (2002)
  Disk 2
  1. "Amore" (1975)
  2. "Maku E Mihi" – Robbie Ratana (1997)
  3. "Walking in the Sun" – Joe Haami (2001)
  4. "Il Silencio" – Tui Teka (1971)
  5. "Deck of Cards" – Nuki Waaka (2000)
  6. "Will It Ever Be the Same" – Billy T. James (1975)
  7. "You Were There" – Mahora (1998)
  8. "Jungle Drums" – Joe Haami (2000)
  9. "Winter Mirage" – Mahora (1975)
  10. "Zorba the Greek" – Billy Peters (2000)
  11. "I Close My Eyes" – Billy T. James (1975)
