= Pūtauaki =

New Zealand volcano

- Mount Edgecumbe
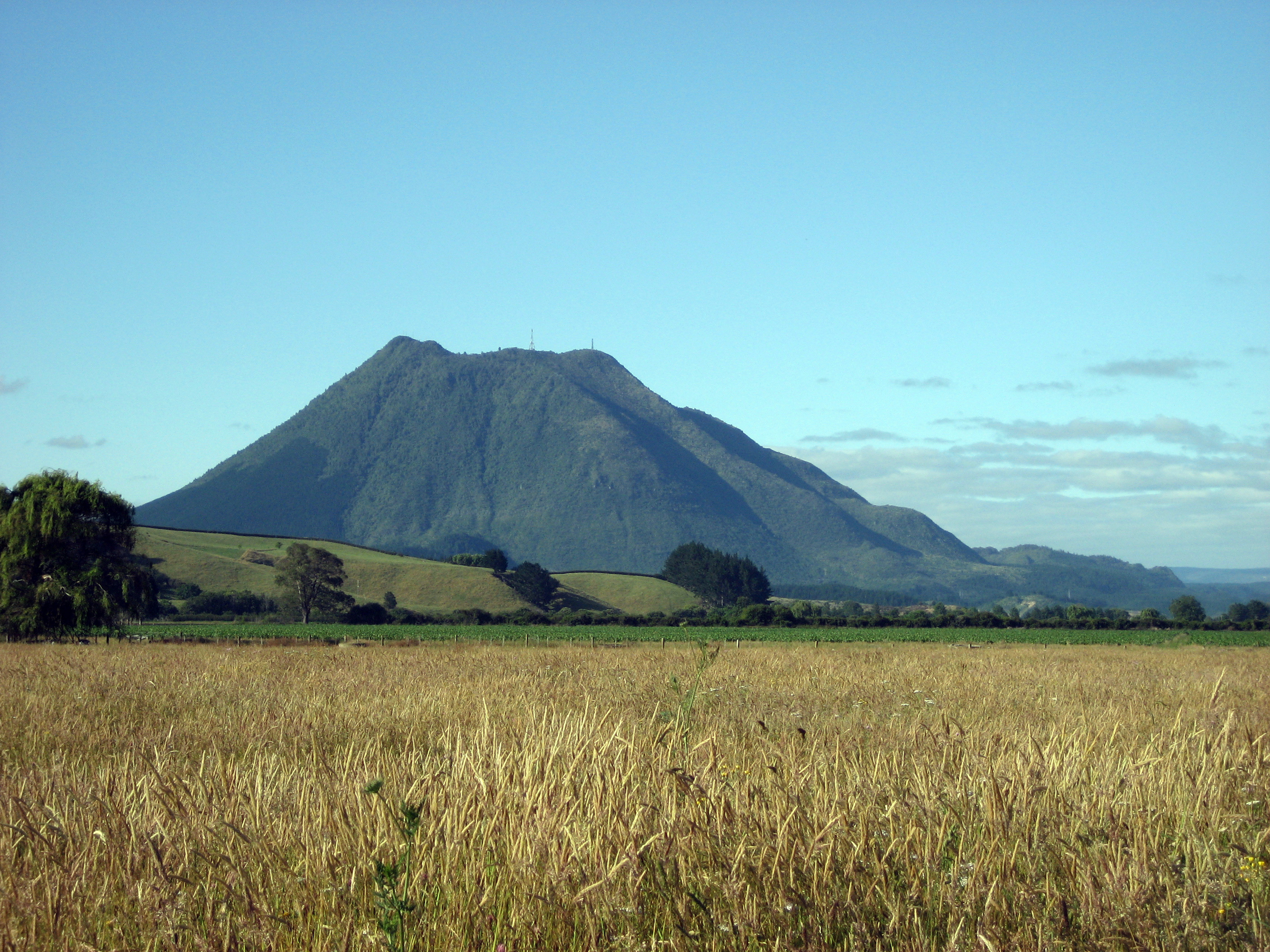
- Pūtauaki (Mount Edgecumbe) from the north

Highest point
- Elevation: 821 m (2,694 ft)
- Coordinates: 38°06′25″S 176°44′24″E

Geography
- Location within North Island
- Map centred on Pūtauaki (red marker) showing surface volcanic deposits including the present surface Ōkataina Caldera ignimbrites. Legend: Key for the volcanics that are shown with panning is: basalt (shades of brown/orange); monogenetic basalts; undifferentiated basalts of the Tangihua Complex in Northland Allochthon; arc basalts; arc ring basalts; dacite; andesite (shades of red); basaltic andesite; rhyolite (ignimbrite is lighter shades of violet); plutonic; White shading is selected caldera features.; Clicking on the rectangle icon enables full window and mouse-over with volcano name/wikilink and ages before present.
- Location: Bay of Plenty Region, New Zealand

Geology
- Last eruption: 540 ± 130 BCE

Pūtauaki, known in English as Mount Edgecumbe, is a dacite volcanic cone in the Bay of Plenty Region of New Zealand. A King of the Mountain race was run on Pūtauaki as part of the international King of the Mountain series between 1955 and 2020, and proceeds were donated to charity.

== Geography ==
Located 50 km (31 mi) east of Rotorua and three kilometres east of Kawerau, it is the easternmost vent of the Taupō Volcanic Zone adjacent to the Ōkataina volcanic centre. The mountain rises to 821 m (2,694 ft) above sea level, and is visible from the waters of the Bay of Plenty, 30 km (19 mi) to the north.

=== Geology ===
The composite volcano is located towards the centre of the onshore portion of the very geologically active Whakatāne Graben in the northeastern aspect of the young, modern Taupō Rift. There were several periods of dome growth and collapse between about 8350 and 2400 years BP. The last substantial volcanic eruption occurred at 540 ± 130 BCE, producing a cubic kilometre of lava. There was a previous eruption dated to 1380 ± 50 BCE. The volcano produced the Edgecumbe Formation which are pyroxene-bearing andesite to dacite lava flows (up to 67 wt% SiO_{2}), domes and minor pyroclastic tephra. Although classified by some as part of the Ōkataina volcanic centre system, compositional studies reveal important differences in the depth of accumulation and fractionation of the magma of the Pūtauaki system consistent with separate plumbing.

Characterised Eruptions Pūtauaki
Years ago	Calendar date	VEI	Volume erupted	Notes
2326	300 BCE	0		
2490 ± 130 cal.yr	540 ± 130 BCE	-	1 km^{3} (0.24 cu mi) DRE	
3330 ± 50 cal.yr	1380 ± 50 BCE	-		
5550 cal.yr	3600 BCE	0		

== History ==
Captain James Cook named the mountain "Mount Edgecumbe" on 2 November 1769, possibly in honour of John Edgecombe, the sergeant of marines on his vessel, the Endeavour. In 1925 the mountain was gazetted with two official names: Putauaki and Mount Edgecumbe.

The New Zealand government took part of the mountain from the Ngāti Awa people in the 1880s as part of a series of North Island land confiscations, supposedly for the purposes of military settlement. In a 1999 report the Waitangi Tribunal declared the confiscation illegal because there was no prospect of placing settlers on the mountain.

== Legendary source of name ==
Māori legend tells of a love affair that Pūtauaki had with Whakaari / White Island. Another version of the legend is that Pūtauaki was lonely after losing a fight for Pīhanga (another mountain) so when he met Tarawera he decided to start a relationship with her. After raising a son and years of a troubled marriage, Pūtauaki cast his eye out towards the sea, where the very beautiful Whakaari was. The two would call out to each other at night while Tarawera slept. One night Pūtauaki could not contain his love any longer and decided to travel out to be with Whakaari. It is said that a mountain can only move once in their life and only at night so Pūtauaki had to travel across the land fast. Little did he know, his son had awoken and was following him. He heard the little whimper from his son and turned around. He tried to tell his son to stay with Tarawera but the little mountain would not leave his father. Then the sun rose and froze the two mountains where they were. When Tarawera awoke she saw that her husband had left and she started to weep, thus creating the Tarawera Falls and river. Until this day Tarawera still cries and Whakaari still calls out for her lover, who is frozen to the spot near Kawerau.

== Transmitter ==
Pūtauaki is home to a major FM radio transmitter for the eastern Bay of Plenty. Prior to digital television transition in December 2013, the transmitter was also the main analogue television transmitter for the area.

Radio Station	Transmit Frequency	Licensed power (kW)
The Breeze	92.1 MHz	1.6
RNZ Concert	95.3 MHz	5
SENZ	96.1 MHz	1.6
Tumeke FM	96.9 MHz	4
RNZ National	101.7 MHz	5
The Edge	104.1 MHz	1.6
The Sound	105.7 MHz	1.6

== Gallery ==
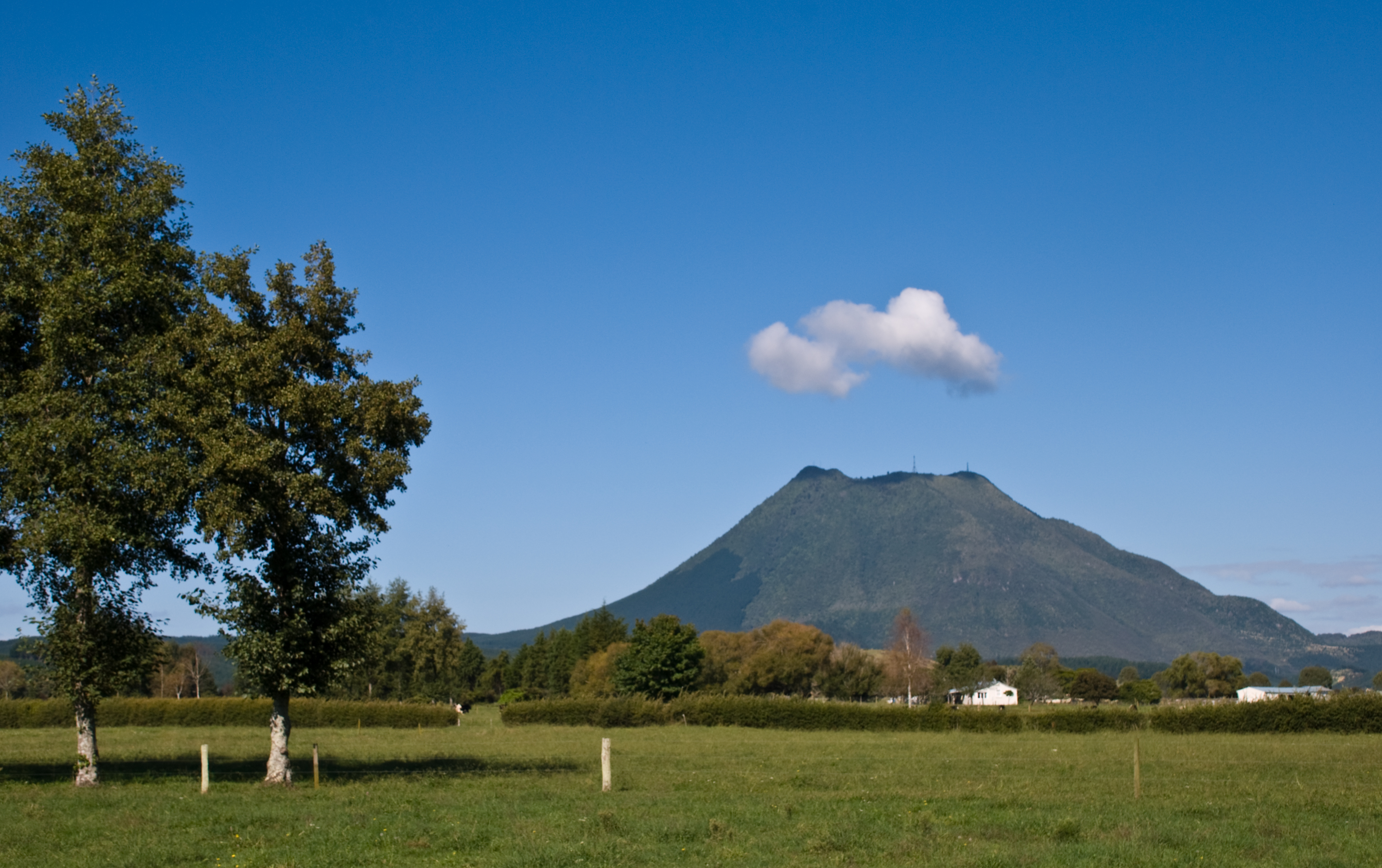
View of the mountain from the north

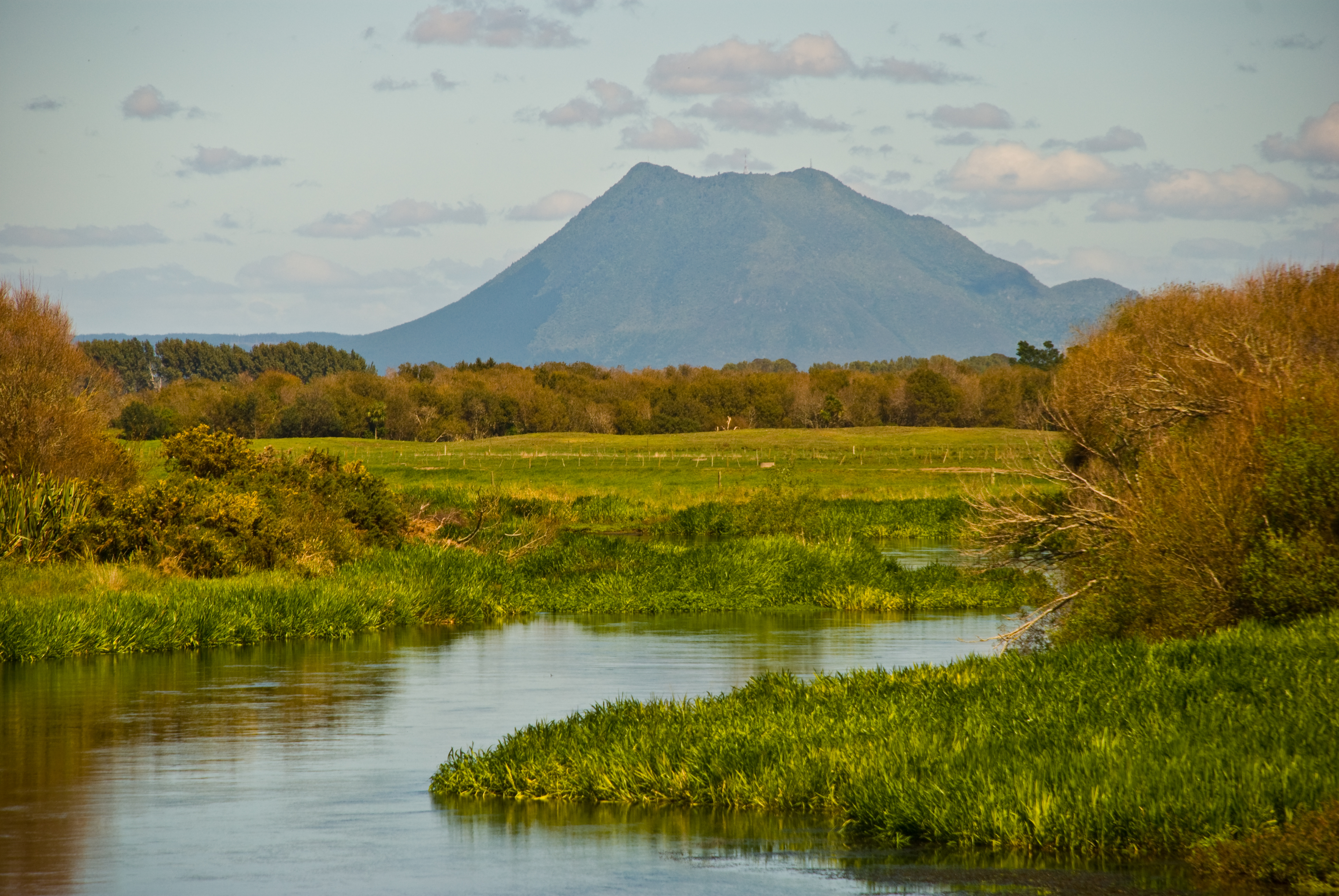
Putauaki and the Tarawera River

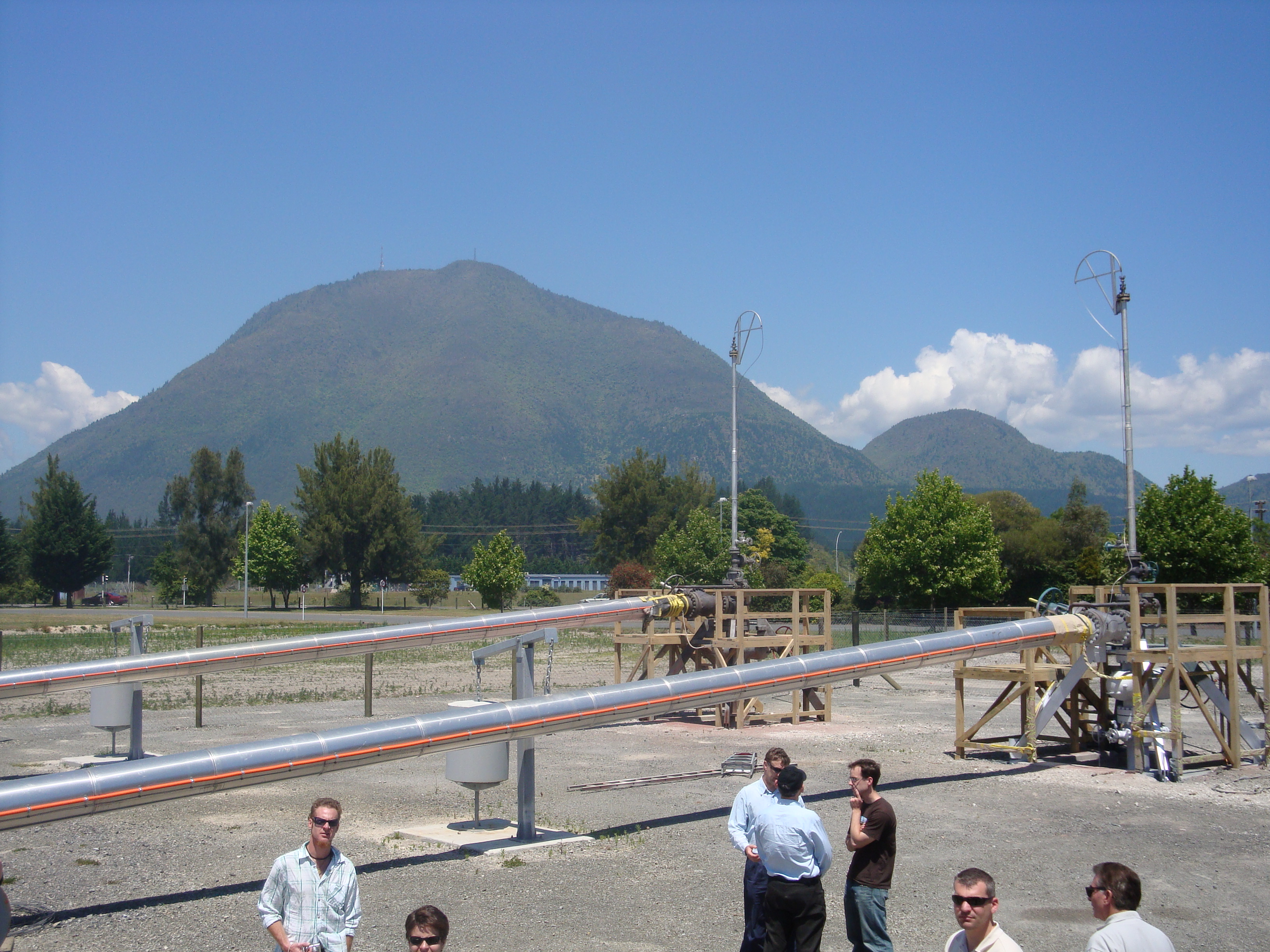
Pūtauaki overlooks a geothermal bore field near Kawerau

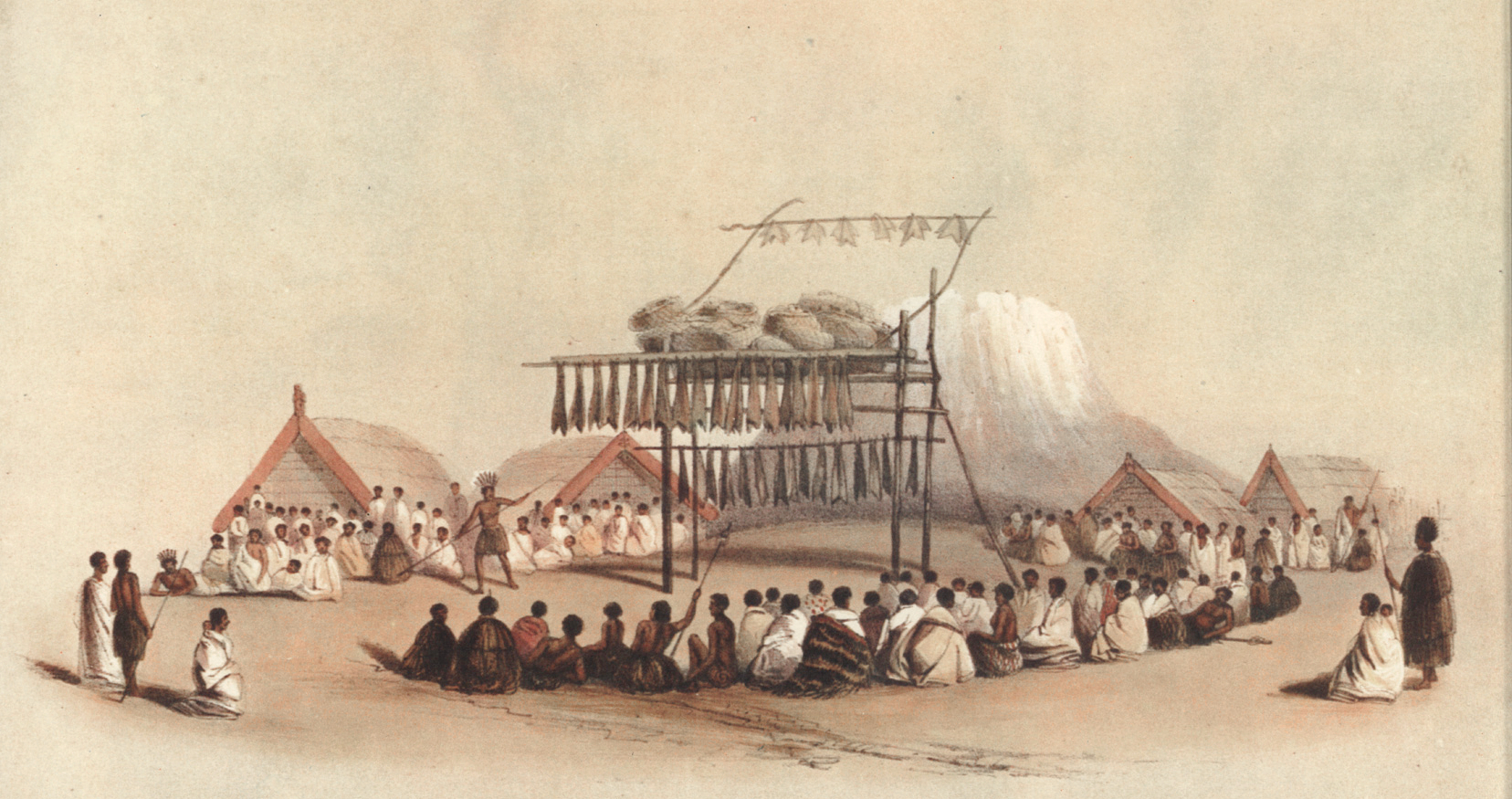
Pūtauaki seen in an 1847 illustration depicting a Māori feast at Matatā

== See also ==
- List of volcanoes in New Zealand
