= Hal Wootten =

Australian jurist (1922–2021)

Hal Wootten AC, QC

Puisne judge of the Supreme Court of New South Wales
- In office 14 March 1973 – 7 October 1983

Personal details
- Born: John Halden Wootten; 19 December 1922 Tweed Heads, New South Wales, Australia
- Died: 27 July 2021 (aged 98)
- Citizenship: Australian
- Spouse: Gillian Cowlishaw
- Education: University of Sydney
- Profession: Barrister; Academic; Judge; Aboriginal and human rights lawyer Social justice advocate

John Halden Wootten AC QC (19 December 1922 – 27 July 2021) was an Australian lawyer and legal academic and the founder of the University of New South Wales Faculty of Law, of which he was the Foundation Chair and its inaugural Dean. Wootten served in multiple capacities and offices, including as a Judge of the Supreme Court of New South Wales, a Chairman of the Law Reform Commission of New South Wales, and a Deputy President of the Native Title Tribunal.

== Early life and education ==
John Halden Wootten was born to a lower-middle-class family of dairy farmers from the North Coast region of New South Wales and is of English descent. Wootten's father grew up at Hal's paternal grandparents' farm in Alstonville, alongside Hal's uncles, in a Methodist upbringing. Wootten's father died when Hal was 11 months old; he was raised by his mother and, primarily, her parents, with whom Wootten lived until he was 9 years old. As a result of his mother's uncontrolled diabetes, Wootten was born a "huge baby", with two broken arms. One of these arms might have otherwise withered were it not for intervention by an elderly black woman who worked for Wootten's mother, who would massage his arms daily; however, though the uses of this arm are restricted, it remained relatively functional.

Wootten undertook his primary schooling at Willoughby Public School and Double Bay Public School, when his mother ran her dress-making business.

Wootten was educated at Sydney Boys High School in Surry Hills, graduating in the class of 1939, and the University of Sydney, from 1940 to 1945, where he earned a B.A., and the Sydney Law School, then the only law school in New South Wales, where he earned an LL.B.

== Career ==
=== Early career ===
During his university studies, and interested in languages but dissuaded by his teacher-turned-school principal paternal uncle, Wootten commenced working at the State Crown Solicitor's Office. From there, he joined the private sector, with the Sydney law firm Minter, Simpson & Co. Minter, Simpson & Co. would later merge with the Melbourne law firm Ellison, Hewison & Whitehead to form MinterEllison.

In 1949, Wootten was called to the bar in New South Wales but did not commence practising as a barrister until 1951. In 1966, he took silk.

=== University of NSW Faculty of Law ===
On 13 July 1964, the University of NSW University Council approved the creation of the UNSW Faculty of Law. On 24 January 1966, the Foundation Chair of Law was created, with the appointee to also be the Dean of the Faculty of Law. On 8 September 1969, Wootten was appointed to this position, where, in 1971, he would oversee the first teaching classes in the faculty.

In 1970, Wootten helped establish the Aboriginal Legal Service, becoming its first president. In 1973, Wootten stepped down from this position to take up his appointment as a Judge of the Supreme Court of New South Wales.

=== Supreme Court of New South Wales ===
Wootten was appointed a puisne judge of the Supreme Court of New South Wales in 1973, serving until 1983.

=== Later career ===
Wootten has been involved in the Royal Commission into Aboriginal Deaths in Custody, and the Australian Conservation Foundation, as its president, among other causes.

Between 1984 and 1986, Wootten served as the chairman of the Australian Press Council. Following Rupert Murdoch's takeover of The Herald and Weekly Times and a decision from the 15-member council against calling on the Commonwealth Government for an independent tribunal to vet proposed media takeovers and in light of the council's failure to object to Murdoch's control of 70% of Australia's print media and the sense that both of these events were wrong and unjust, Wootten resigned in protest, alongside John Lawrence, a former federal president of the Australian Journalists Association.

Allowing Murdoch to assume control of Australian newspapers was unparalleled outside of totalitarian countries. The Federal Treasurer could stop the takeover if he wanted to … in this case it is a man who has renounced his citizenship to further his worldwide media power, and who makes no secret of the fact that he intends to make personal use of his control of newspapers.

— Hal Wootten, Sydney Morning Herald (17 December 1986)

== Honours ==
In 1990 Wootten was appointed Companion of the Order of Australia (AC) for "service to human rights, to conservation, to legal education and to the law". In 1994, Wootten was awarded an honorary LL.D. in recognition for his services to the law and the UNSW Faculty of Law.

== Personal life and death ==
Wootten was married three times. His first wife was Dorothy Adam, with whom he had four children; they separated in the early 1970s. In 1976 he married Jane Mathews (1940–2019) who was judge in the District, Supreme, and Federal Courts. After that marriage also ended in divorce, in 1991 he married Gillian Cowlishaw, a professor of anthropology at the University of Sydney.

Wootten died on 27 July 2021 at the age of 98. He was survived by his wife, Gillian Cowlishaw.

Media offices
Preceded by Geoffrey Sawer	Chairman of the Australian Press Council; 1987–1997	Succeeded by David Flint
