= Wēpiha Apanui =

Māori leader and carver (died 1880)

- Born: New Zealand
- Known for: carving

Wēpiha Apanui (died 1880) was a New Zealand Māori tribal leader and carver of New Zealand. He identified with the Ngāti Awa iwi of the eastern Bay of Plenty. He was trained as a carver by his father, Apanui Te Hāmaiwaho. His best known carvings include the Mataatua Wharenui in Whakatāne (1875), the Hotunui whare rūnanga in 1878 (now on display in the Auckland War Memorial Museum).
