= Te Hura Te Taiwhakaripi =

New Zealand tribal leader

Te Hura Te Taiwhakaripi (fl. 1861–1866) was a notable New Zealand tribal leader. Of Māori descent, he identified with the Ngāti Awa iwi. He was active from about 1861.
