= Te Kari Waaka =

Te Kari Waaka (6 March 1916 – 28 November 1991) was a notable New Zealand Ringatū minister, community leader. Of Māori descent, he identified with the Ngāti Pūkeko and Tuhoe iwi. He was born in Poroporo, Bay of Plenty, New Zealand in 1916.
