= Eruera Riini Mānuera =

New Zealand tribal leader

Eruera Riini Mānuera OBE (6 January 1895 – 15 June 1990) was a New Zealand tribal leader, labourer and farmer. Of Māori descent, he identified with the Ngāti Awa iwi. He was born in Te Waea, Bay of Plenty, New Zealand, on 6 January 1895.

In the 1974 New Year Honours, Manuera was appointed a Member of the Order of the British Empire, for services to the Māori people. He was promoted to Officer of the Order of the British Empire, also for services to the Māori people, in the 1977 New Year Honours.
