= Matatā =

Rural settlement in Bay of Plenty Region, New Zealand

- Town
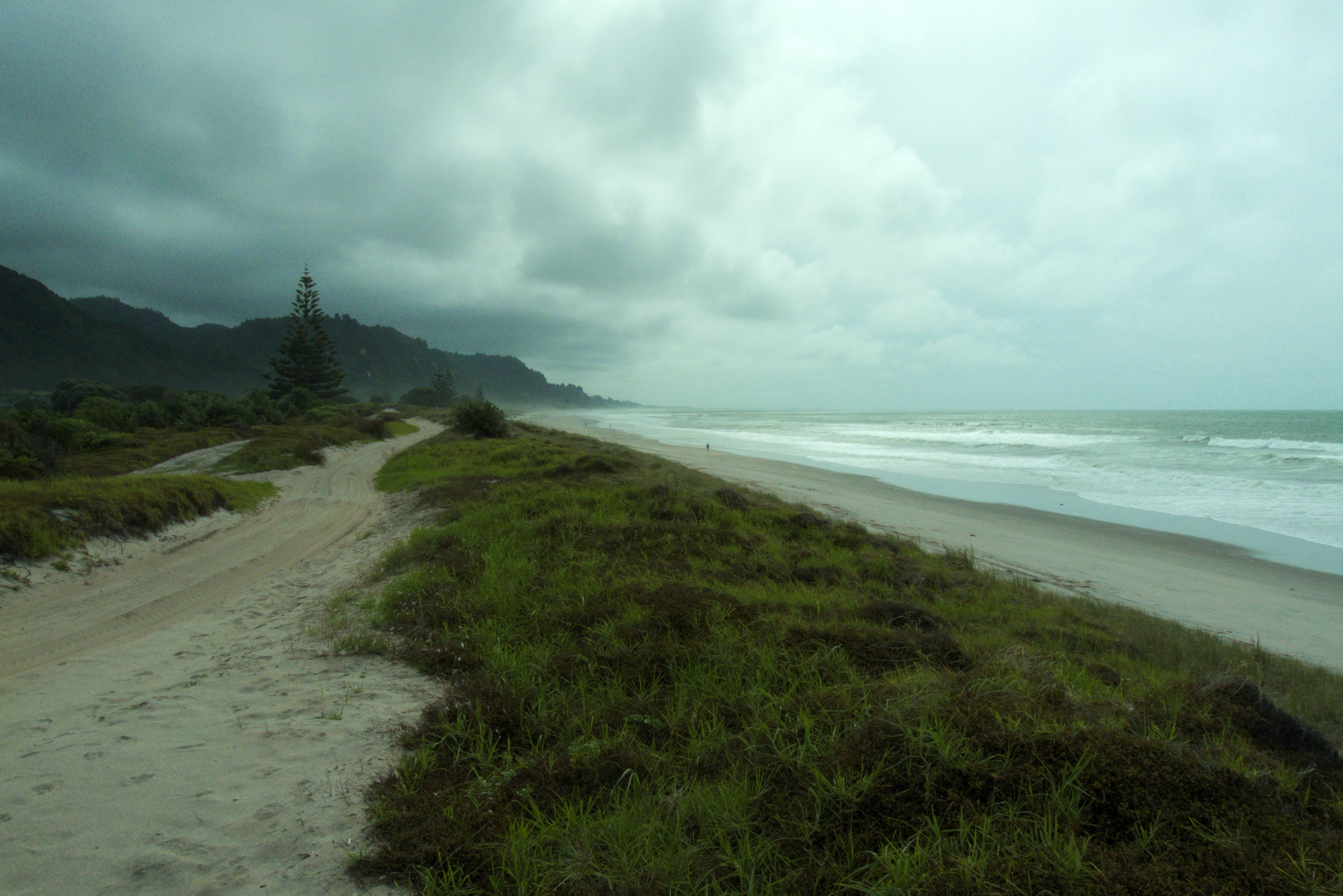
- Te Awa a te Atua Beach
- Interactive map of Matatā
- Coordinates: 37°53′S 176°45′E
- Country: New Zealand
- Region: Bay of Plenty
- Territorial authority: Whakatāne District
- Ward: Rangitāiki General Ward
- Community: Rangitāiki Community
- Electorates: East Cape; Waiariki (Māori)

Government
  - Territorial authority: Whakatāne District Council
  - Regional council: Bay of Plenty Regional Council
  - Mayor of Whakatāne: Nándor Tánczos
  - East Cape MP: Dana Kirkpatrick
  - Waiariki MP: Rawiri Waititi

Area
  - Total: 0.78 km^{2} (0.30 sq mi)

Population (June 2025)
  - Total: 720
  - Density: 920/km^{2} (2,400/sq mi)
- Postcode(s): 3194

Matatā is a town in the Bay of Plenty in the North Island of New Zealand, 24 kilometres (15 mi) to the north-west of Whakatāne. A section of the town was relocated between the years 2006 and 2021 due to increased natural threats arising from climate change. As an example of forced retreat, Matatā is seen as providing lessons for future actions elsewhere.

== History ==
Prior to the 1910s, the Tarawera River flowed west past Matatā before entering the Bay of Plenty. In 1917, the Tarawera River mouth was straightened, and the former mouth, traditionally known as Te Awa o te Atua, became silted and formed the Matatā Lagoon, to the north of the township.

In 2005 the town was inundated by two debris flows from the Awatarariki and Waitepuru Streams that devastated a number of buildings, but did not cause any casualties. The debris flows were caused by a band of intense rain, at a rate of over 2 mm (0.079 in) per minute, that fell into the catchments southwest of Matatā, dislodging a huge amount of debris that had built up behind a temporary dam. From January 2005 the area was subject to hundreds of shallow, low intensity earthquakes, with the most intense swarms occurring in 2005 and 2007, but continuing to at least February 2009. The largest event was of magnitude 4.2 in May 2007.

As a result of the 2005 landslides, Whakatāne District Council began to plan for a managed retreat over the next decade for residents located near the mouth of the Awatarariki Stream. The vast majority of residents accepted the need to relocate and did so with council assistance and compensation but as of October 2021, one resident has rejected both the process and the need to move and was the sole remaining occupant of this section of the town. NIWA coastal hazards expert, Rob Bell, says the general issue of forced retreat is primarily socio‑political rather than technocratic.

In 2016, scientists discovered a large amount of volcanic activity, including "an inflating magma" buildup, 10 kilometres (6.2 mi) below the surface of the town.

In 2019, the name of the town was officially gazetted as Matatā.

== Marae ==
Matatā has four marae:

- Iramoko Marae and Te Paetata meeting house, affiliated with the Ngāti Awa hapū of Te Tāwera.
- Ngāti Umutahi Marae and Umutahi meeting house, affiliated with the Ngāti Tūwharetoa hapū of Ngāti Iramoko, Ngāti Umutahi and Te Tāwera.
- Ōniao Marae and Tūwharetoa meeting house, affiliated with the Ngāti Tūwharetoa hapū of Ngāi Tamarangi, Ngāti Umutahi and Ngāti Manuwhare.
- Rangitihi Marae and Rangiaohia meeting house is affiliated with Ngāti Rangitihi.

In October 2020, the Government committed $1,646,820 from the Provincial Growth Fund to upgrade Rangitihi Marae and five other local marae, creating 10 jobs.

== Demographics ==
Matatā is described by Statistics New Zealand as a rural settlement, and covers 0.78 km^{2} (0.30 sq mi). It had an estimated population of 720 as of June 2025, with a population density of 923 people per km^{2}. Matatā is part of the larger Matatā-Otakiri statistical area.

Historical population for Matatā
Year	Pop.	±% p.a.
2006	639	—
2013	645	+0.13%
2018	681	+1.09%
2023	672	−0.27%

Matatā had a population of 672 in the 2023 New Zealand census, a decrease of 9 people (−1.3%) since the 2018 census, and an increase of 27 people (4.2%) since the 2013 census. There were 330 males, 339 females, and 3 people of other genders in 246 dwellings. 2.2% of people identified as LGBTIQ+. The median age was 42.6 years (compared with 38.1 years nationally). There were 132 people (19.6%) aged under 15 years, 102 (15.2%) aged 15 to 29, 309 (46.0%) aged 30 to 64, and 129 (19.2%) aged 65 or older.

People could identify as more than one ethnicity. The results were 58.5% European (Pākehā); 58.0% Māori; 3.1% Pasifika; 3.1% Asian; 0.9% Middle Eastern, Latin American and African New Zealanders (MELAA); and 1.8% other, which includes people giving their ethnicity as "New Zealander". English was spoken by 96.0%, Māori by 16.1%, and other languages by 2.7%. No language could be spoken by 2.2% (e.g. too young to talk). New Zealand Sign Language was known by 0.4%. The percentage of people born overseas was 8.5, compared with 28.8% nationally.

Religious affiliations were 34.4% Christian, 4.5% Māori religious beliefs, 0.4% Buddhist, 0.4% New Age, and 1.8% other religions. People who answered that they had no religion were 52.2%, and 7.1% of people did not answer the census question.

Of those at least 15 years old, 93 (17.2%) people had a bachelor's or higher degree, 306 (56.7%) had a post-high school certificate or diploma, and 144 (26.7%) people exclusively held high school qualifications. The median income was $33,400, compared with $41,500 nationally. 45 people (8.3%) earned over $100,000 compared to 12.1% nationally. The employment status of those at least 15 was 231 (42.8%) full-time, 66 (12.2%) part-time, and 24 (4.4%) unemployed.

=== Matatā-Otakiri statistical area ===
Matatā-Otakiri statistical area, which also includes the settlement of Otakiri, covers 87.44 km^{2} (33.76 sq mi) and had an estimated population of 1,880 as of June 2025, with a population density of 22 people per km^{2}.

Historical population for Matatā-Otakiri
Year	Pop.	±% p.a.
2006	1,608	—
2013	1,671	+0.55%
2018	1,737	+0.78%
2023	1,746	+0.10%

Matatā-Otakiri had a population of 1,746 in the 2023 New Zealand census, an increase of 9 people (0.5%) since the 2018 census, and an increase of 75 people (4.5%) since the 2013 census. There were 867 males, 876 females, and 3 people of other genders in 636 dwellings. 1.5% of people identified as LGBTIQ+. The median age was 40.8 years (compared with 38.1 years nationally). There were 357 people (20.4%) aged under 15 years, 270 (15.5%) aged 15 to 29, 810 (46.4%) aged 30 to 64, and 309 (17.7%) aged 65 or older.

People could identify as more than one ethnicity. The results were 73.4% European (Pākehā); 39.2% Māori; 2.1% Pasifika; 4.5% Asian; 0.7% Middle Eastern, Latin American and African New Zealanders (MELAA); and 2.7% other, which includes people giving their ethnicity as "New Zealander". English was spoken by 97.1%, Māori by 10.7%, and other languages by 4.3%. No language could be spoken by 1.7% (e.g. too young to talk). New Zealand Sign Language was known by 0.3%. The percentage of people born overseas was 11.2, compared with 28.8% nationally.

Religious affiliations were 30.4% Christian, 0.2% Islam, 2.9% Māori religious beliefs, 0.2% Buddhist, 0.3% New Age, and 1.7% other religions. People who answered that they had no religion were 55.8%, and 8.6% of people did not answer the census question.

Of those at least 15 years old, 219 (15.8%) people had a bachelor's or higher degree, 843 (60.7%) had a post-high school certificate or diploma, and 324 (23.3%) people exclusively held high school qualifications. The median income was $39,100, compared with $41,500 nationally. 126 people (9.1%) earned over $100,000 compared to 12.1% nationally. The employment status of those at least 15 was 654 (47.1%) full-time, 222 (16.0%) part-time, and 45 (3.2%) unemployed.

== Education ==
Matata School is a decile 5 state primary school with a roll of 98 students. It opened in 1872 as Matata Native School.

St Joseph's Catholic School is a decile 2 integrated primary school with a roll of 36 students. It opened in 1891.

Both schools are coeducational and cater for years 1–8. Rolls are as of July 2026.
