= Gugi Waaka =

New Zealand musical entertainer (1937–2014)

- Born: Hore Wiremu Waaka; 1 August 1937; Whakatāne, New Zealand
- Origin: New Zealand
- Died: 5 July 2014 (aged 76) Auckland, New Zealand
- Genres: Māori show band
- Instruments: Guitar, vocals
- Years active: 1960–2014
- Formerly of: Quin Tikis; Polynesian Trio; Maori Volcanics Showband; New Zealand Impacts Showband; Maori Premiers; Gugi Walker Quartet

Hore Wiremu "Gugi" Waaka (1 August 1937 – 5 July 2014), also known as Gugi Walker, was a New Zealand musical entertainer. A guitarist and singer, he was a founding member of the Quin Tikis and the Maori Volcanics Showband.

== Biography ==
Of Ngāti Awa and Ngāti Pūkeko descent, Waaka was born on 1 August 1937. He grew up at Poroporo, near Whakatāne.

After serving in the air force in the late 1950s, Waaka began his show business career and was a founding member of the Quin Tikis. Moving to Australia, he formed in the Polynesian Trio with his brother and sister-in-law, Nuki and Mahora Waaka, in 1961. The trio then joined with Matti Kemp, John Clarke and Hector Epae, forming the Maori Volcanics Showband in 1964. Waaka left the band after a few months following a minor disagreement with Nuki.

Waaka was a member of a number of other show bands, including the Maori Premiers and the New Zealand Impacts Showband, and formed the eponymous Gugi Walker Quartet.

Between 2002 and 2007 Waaka performed at the annual Aotearoa Māori Sports Awards, providing post-awards entertainment.

Following his death from heart problems on 5 July 2014, Waaka's body lay in state at Papakura Marae.
