= Sam Emery =

New Zealand farmer and politician (1885–1967)

Samuel Horouta Emery (1885 – 20 April 1967) was a New Zealand labourer, farmer, rugby player, storekeeper, carrier, businessman and local politician. Of Māori descent, he identified with the Ngāti Mahuta, Ngāti Maniapoto, Ngāti Pūkeko and Waikato iwi. He was born in Kakepuku, Waikato, New Zealand, in 1885.

From a poor family and unable to read or write, Emery ran away aged 12 to work in the gumfields. He later set up a bus service, Emery Transport Company. In 1915, he became a partner in a sawmilling business and bought a 34-passenger launch, Hikuwai. He was also the licensed postmaster at Rotoiti. He became involved with incorporating Māori land and held office in tribal trusts. In 1944 he was elected to the Rotorua County Council. After his wife Kataraina died, he organised the building of a large meeting house, Te Rangiunuora, which was opened by the Prime Minister Walter Nash.

In 1953, Emery was awarded the Queen Elizabeth II Coronation Medal.
