= Hamiora Tumutara Te Tihi-o-te-whenua Pio =

New Zealand tohunga and historian

Hamiora Tumutara Te Tihi-o-te-whenua Pio (1814–1901) was a New Zealand Māori tohunga and historian. Of Māori descent, he identified with the Ngati Awa and Ngati Tuwharetoa iwi. He was born in New Zealand in 1814.
