= Eruera Hamiora Tumutara =

Eruera Hamiora Tumutara (c.1859 – 11 January 1930) was a notable New Zealand Ringatū bishop. Of Māori descent, he identified with the Ngati Awa and Ngati Tuwharetoa iwi. He was born in Te Whaiti, Bay of Plenty, New Zealand, in about 1859.
