= Tarawera River =

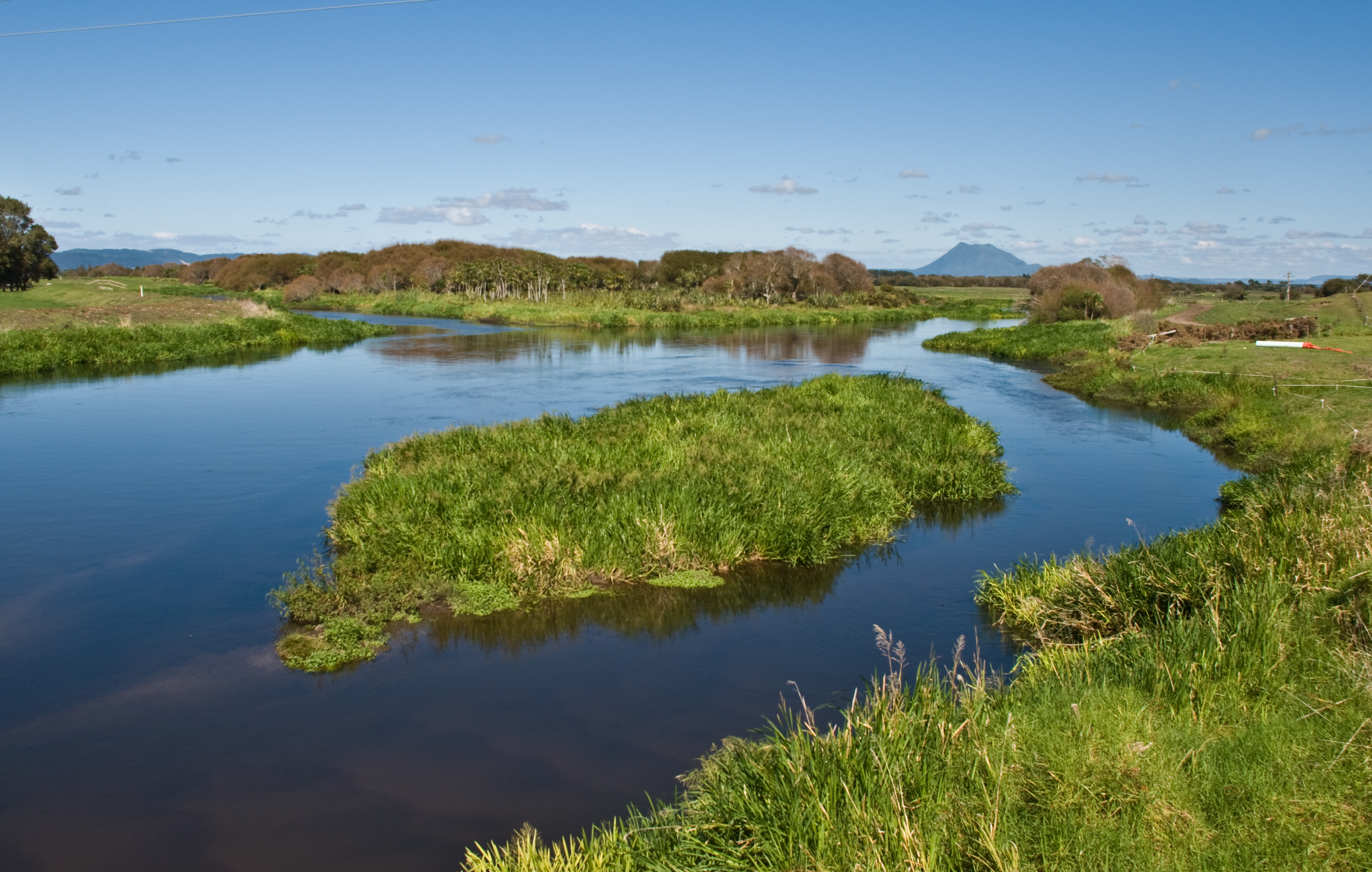
- Tarawera River on the Rangitaiki Plains
- Route of the Tarawera River

Location
- Country: New Zealand
- Region: Bay of Plenty
- District: Rotorua, Kawerau, Whakatāne
- Towns: Kawerau

Physical characteristics
- Source: Lake Tarawera
  - coordinates: 38.183939°S 176.500089°E
  - elevation: 298 m (978 ft)
- Mouth
  - location: Bay of Plenty
  - coordinates: 37.890138°S 176.788823°E
  - elevation: Sea level
- Length: 65 km (40 mi)
- Basin size: 906 km^{2} (350 mi^{2}) (measured up to Awakaponga)
- Discharge
  - average: 26 m^{3}/s (920 cu ft/s)

Basin features
- Tributaries
  - left: Mangakotukutuku Stream, Kaipara Stream, Korutu Stream, Buddles Creek, Ruruanga Stream, Lake Rotoroa, Mangaone Stream, Waikamihi Stream, Awakaponga Canal, Te Awa o te Atua / Matatā Lagoon
  - right: Waiaute Stream, Mangawhio Stream, Mangate Stream, Awaiti Canal, Old Rangitaiki Channel
- Waterfalls: Tarawera Cascades, Tarawera Falls
- Bridges: Tarawera Bridge

The Tarawera River is in the Bay of Plenty Region in the North Island of New Zealand.

It flows from Lake Tarawera, northeastwards across the northern flanks of the active volcano Mount Tarawera, and past the town of Kawerau before turning north, reaching the Bay of Plenty 6 kilometres (4 mi) west of Edgecumbe. The Tarawera Falls are located in the upper reaches of the Tarawera River.

== Geology ==
The Tarawera River drains the north-eastern aspect of the Taupō Rift with its river mouth west of Matatā. The river commences at the north-east arm of Lake Tarawera with a mean outflow of 7 m^{3}/s (250 cu ft/s), from effectively a watershed of the Ōkataina Caldera, with its risk of volcanic activity disrupting river flow. At this normal or less flow the river disappears underground into caves in the rhyolite lava flow just before the Tarawera Falls. It usually emerges about halfway up the full falls drop, but can with recent rain fully occupy the drop. There have been two known major floods following the breakdown of temporary volcanic material dams at the lake outlet.

The first, and larger, followed the 1314 ± 12 CE Kaharoa eruption. The present river start is where the Tapahoro lava flow, created by the 5526 ± 145 BP Whakatane eruption, runs into a 14,009 ± 155 BP Pokohu lava flow. The Tarawera River flows across this in a 10 m (33 ft) wide channel. The 1314 eruption blocked the outlet with a temporary dam up to 32 m (105 ft) above present outlet levels, which was subsequently eroded with a great flood that created a 350 m (1,150 ft) wide, and almost 40 m (130 ft) deep valley spillway at the start of the river. It seems the river during this flood overflowed to the east draining for a time through the Awiti Ravine, and back into the Tarawera River flood plain by the present Waiaute Stream that drains the eastern slopes of Mount Tarawera. However it also evacuated 3 km (1.9 mi) downstream from the lake at the terminus of the Pokohu lava flow the amphitheatre of the Tarawera Falls. The flood deposited large boulders up to 20 m (66 ft) in diameter for 1 km (0.62 mi) below the falls and up to 13 m (43 ft) to 8 km (5.0 mi) below the falls.

The lake outlet was blocked again after the 1886 eruption of Mount Tarawera, and the lake level increased to a maximum of 12.8 m (42 ft) above its present level. This volcanic debris dam (the debris that blocked the outlet were not just from the eruption directly but included those washed down from a creek that runs into the lake by the outlet), first broke on 1 November 1904, with a main flood surge on 3 November 1904 which was assessed at a peak flow of 700 m^{3}/s (25,000 cu ft/s). This flood resulted in the raising of the river bed (aggradation), and sedimentation problems to 50 km (31 mi) downstream of the lake.

== History and environmental issues ==
Prior to the 1910s, the Rangitaiki River drained into the Tarawera River before entering the Bay of Plenty, west of the settlement of Matatā. In 1914, the Rangitaiki River was cut directly to the Bay of Plenty, with a similar effort undertaken in 1917 for the Tarawera River. This led to the former mouth of the river, traditionally known as Te Awa o te Atua, silting up and forming the Matatā Lagoon. The former mouth of the Rangitaiki River remains to the east of the mouth of the Tarawera River, creating the Old Rangitaiki Channel.

The Tasman Pulp and Paper Mill, now owned by Norske Skog, has been discharging waste into the river since 1955. Local residents have erected signposts labelling the river as the "Black Drain" since the 1990s.

The dark colour is due to the presence of pollution from farms, sewage and stormwater but it is predominantly from pulp and paper mill effluent. As of 1997, pulp and paper mills were discharging over 160 million litres of industrial waste into the river per day. By 2006, the oxygen levels in the river had reached a level where fish could survive, however the water colour was still dark. Since 1998 the colour and light penetration (euphotic depth) have improved in the lower section of the river due to less pollution from the Tasman Mill.

In 2009, the mill gained permission to continue polluting the river for the next 25 years. In 2010, local iwi took a case to the High Court to shorten the 25 year water discharge permits issued under the Resource Management Act but the appeal was rejected.

== Gallery ==
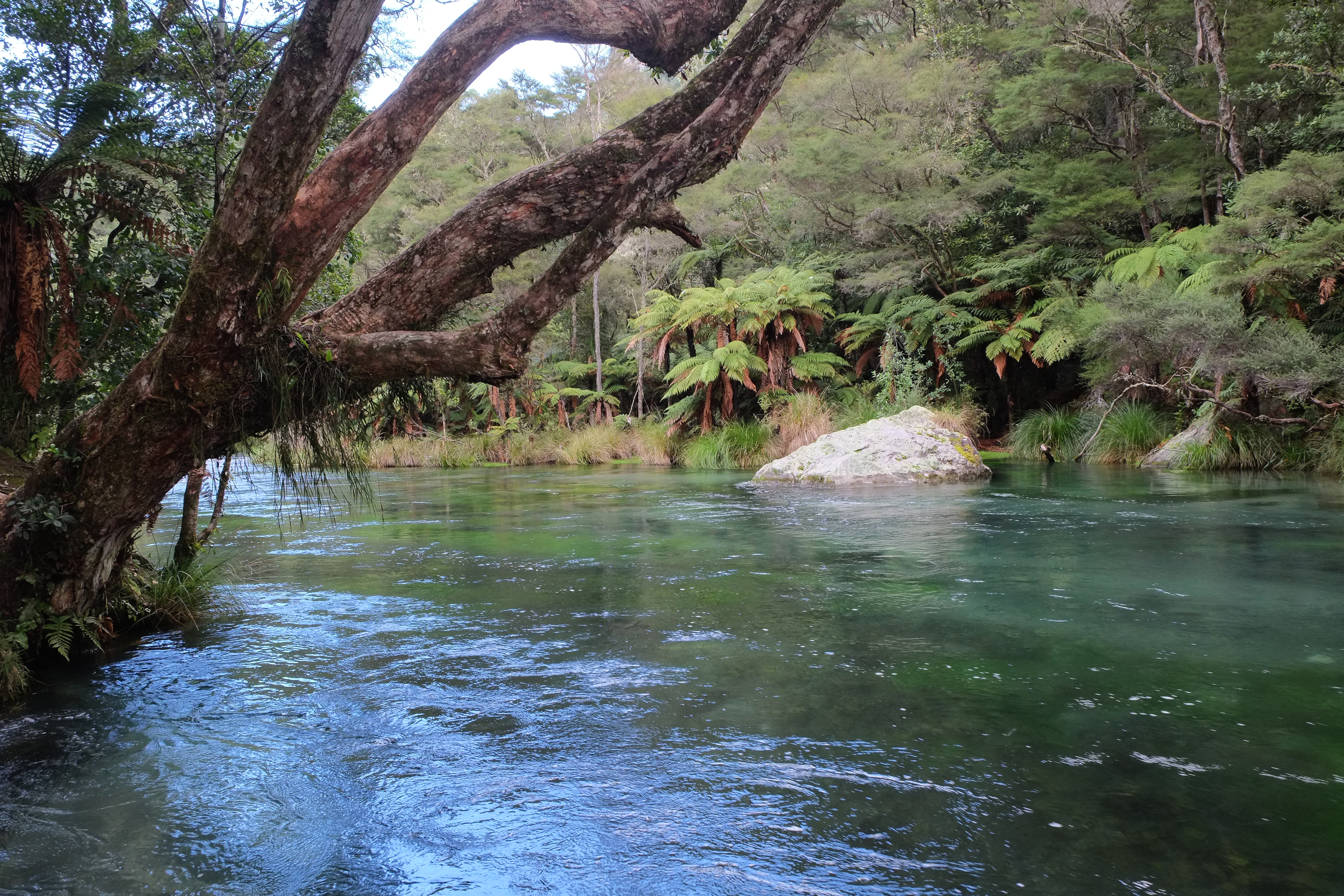
Upper Tarawera River.

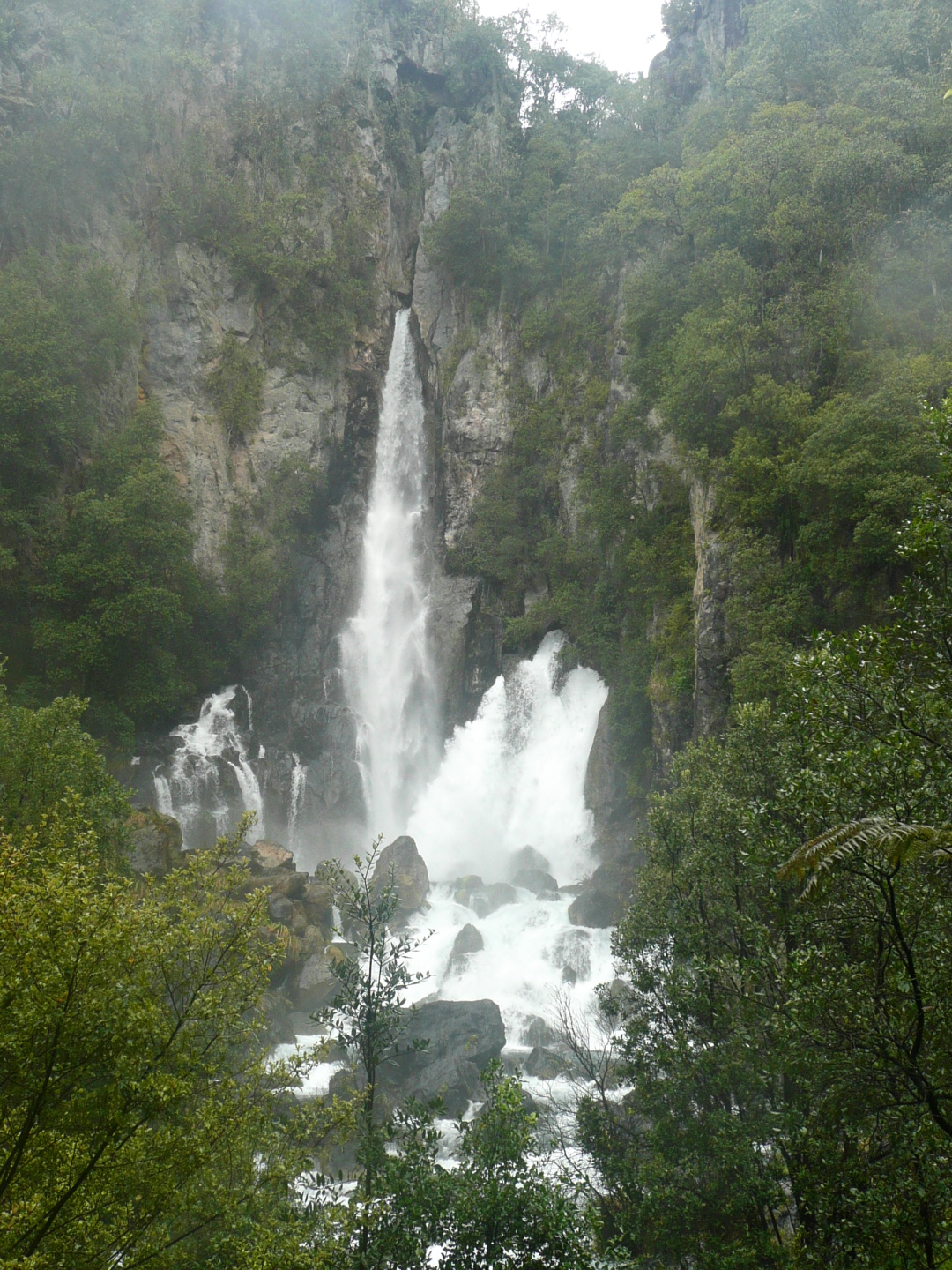
Tarawera Falls on a misty high flow day.

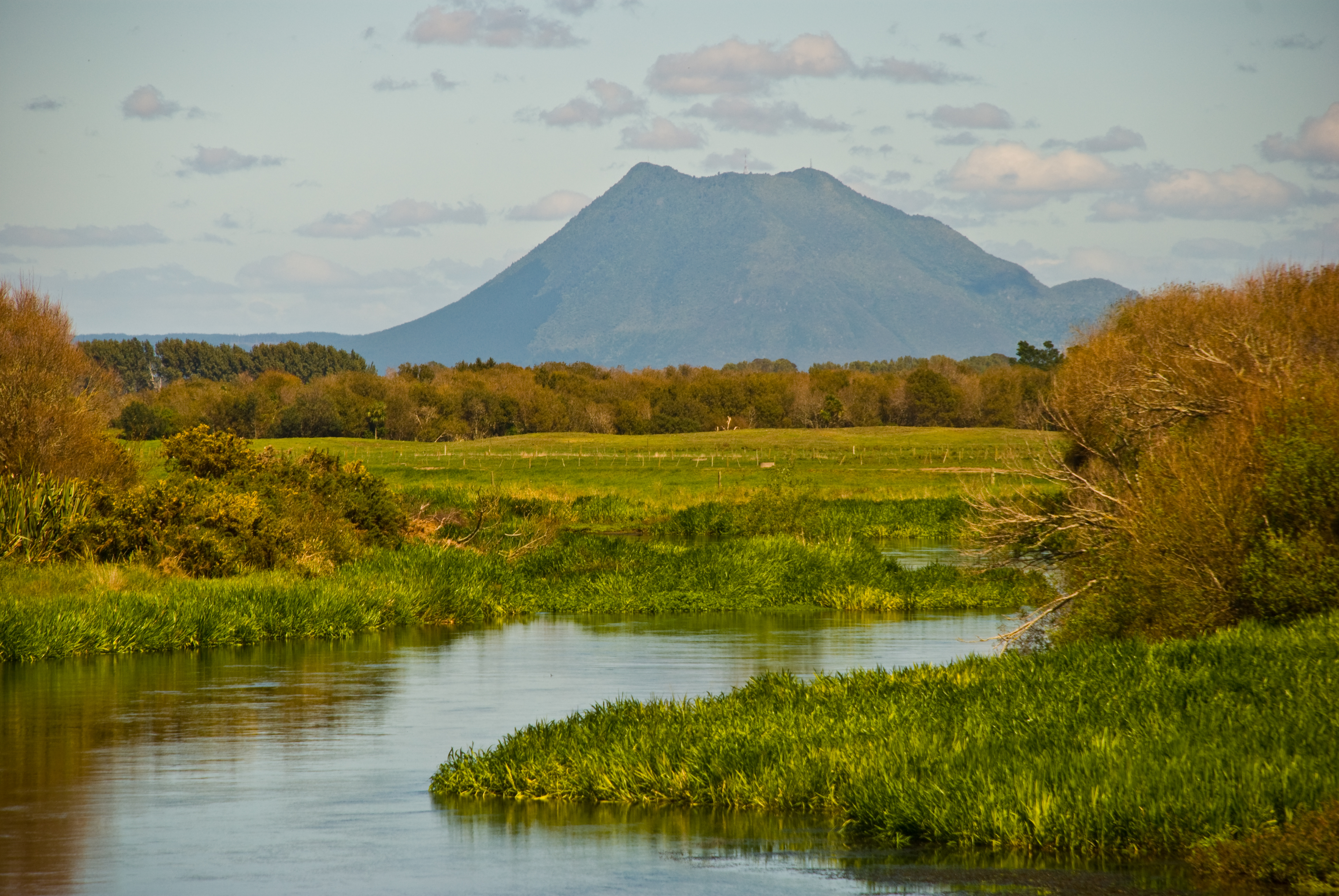
Easterly view across Tarawera River in its flood plain towards Putauaki.
