= Ngāti Awa =

Māori iwi (tribe) in New Zealand

- Iwi (tribe) in Māoridom
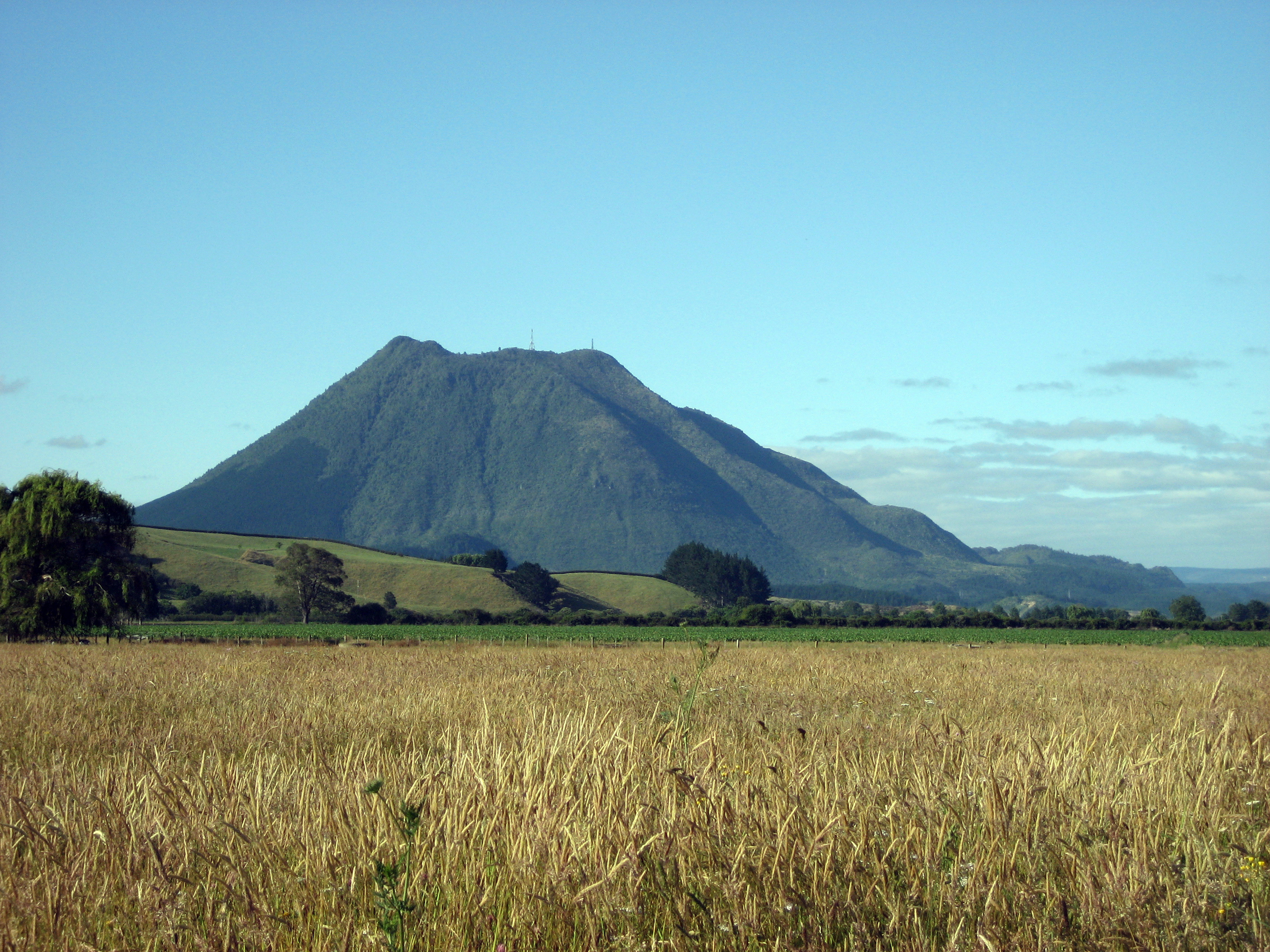
- Pūtauaki, ancestral mountain of Ngāti Awa.

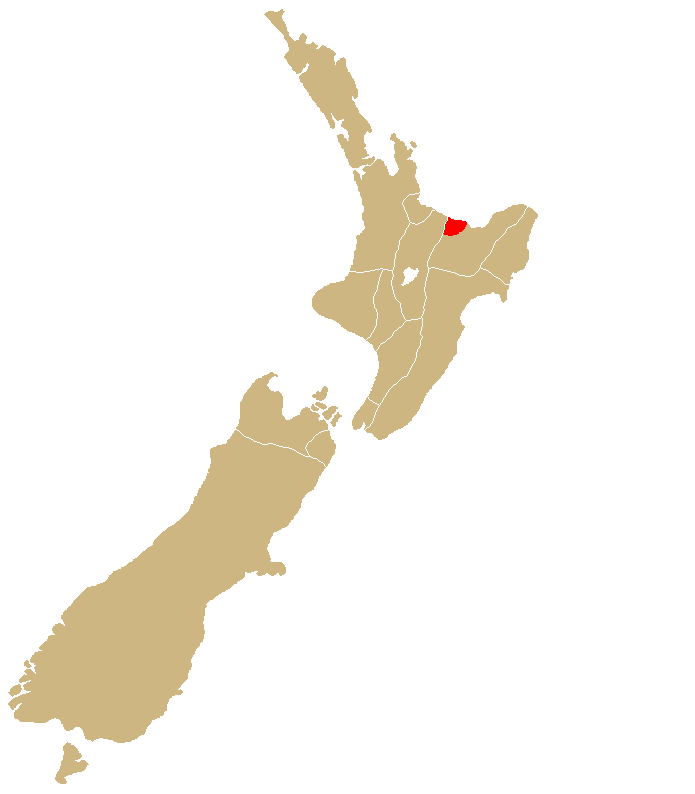
- Rohe (region): Bay of Plenty Region
- Waka (canoe): Mātaatua
- Population: 15,258

Ngāti Awa is a Māori iwi (tribe) centred in the eastern Bay of Plenty Region of New Zealand. It is made of 22 hapū (subtribes), with 15,258 people claiming affiliation to the iwi in 2006. The Ngāti Awa people are primarily located in towns on the Rangitaiki Plain, including Whakatāne, Kawerau, Edgecumbe, Te Teko and Matatā. Two urban hapū also exist in Auckland (Ngāti Awa-ki-Tamaki) and Wellington (Ngāti Awa-ki-Poneke).

== History ==
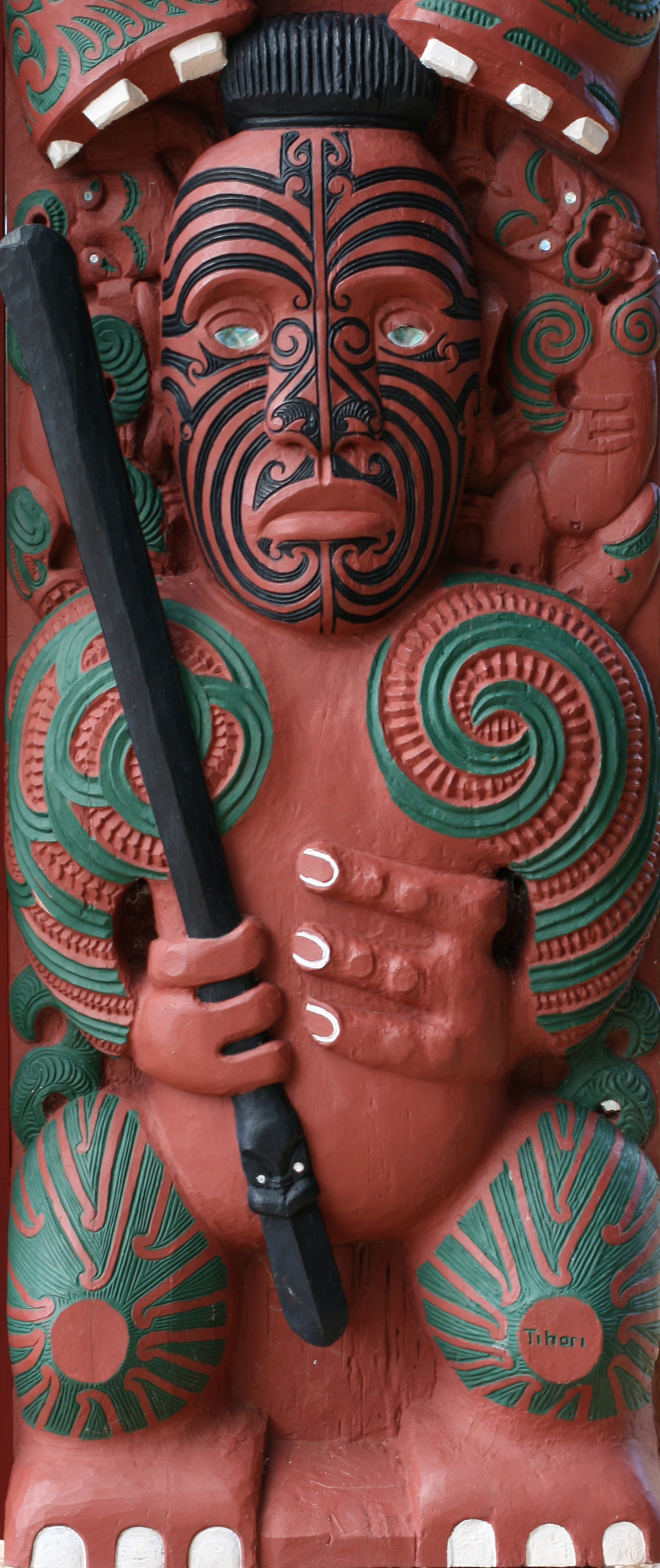
Carving representing Tihori, ancestor of the Māori tribe Ngāti Awa of Bay of Plenty, New Zealand.

=== Early history ===
Ngāti Awa traces its origins to the arrival of Māori settlers on the Mātaatua waka (canoe). The Mātaatua settlers established settlements in the Bay of Plenty and Northland. Initially, the tribe controlled a large area in Northland, but conflicts with other northern iwi resulted in a southward migration. One group eventually settled in the eastern Bay of Plenty, whose descendants would eventually found the iwi.

Awanuiarangi II is recognised as the eponymous ancestor of Ngāti Awa. Awanuiarangi II was a chief descended from Toroa, captain of the Mātaatua. Descendants of Awanuiarangi II eventually formed their own iwi, Ngāti Awa, named after their ancestor.

=== Tribal and land wars ===
Ngāti Awa was frequently at war with neighbouring iwi, including those with similar ancestry.

During the Musket Wars of about 1806-1845, Ngāti Awa played the part of both defender and aggressor. In 1818, Ngāti Awa protected Ngāti Pukeko (then an independent iwi but now a hapū of Ngāti Awa) from raid by Te Morenga and Korokoro of Ngāpuhi. Strategically withdrawing to the Urewera hills, the allies held out successfully at Okahukura pā until reinforcements arrived, ultimately driving off the raiders with heavy casualties. In an 1821-1822 raid, Pōmare and Te Wera Hauraki of Ngāpuhi returned to avenge this defeat. Ngāti Awa and Ngāti Pukeko initially tried to hold out in abandoned Tūhoe pā in Ruatoki, but after losing five of these pā the rangatira Te Mautaranui (who also descended from Tūhoe) led a wholesale evacuation that Ngāpuhi pursued nearly 70 kilometers to the south. Eventually, Te Mautaranui opened negotiations with Pōmare and secured not only peace for Ngāti Awa and Tūhoe, but Pōmare’s friendship as well. When the Tūhoe rangatira Te Rangiwaitatao was killed by Ngāti Kahungunu, Te Mautaranui was able to call upon Pōmare to join an 1824 retaliatory raid with Ngāti Whātua, Whakatōhea, Ngāti Maru, Ngāti Tamaterā, Ngāiterangi, Tūhoe, and Ngāti Awa against Ngāti Kahungunu’s Titirangi pā, which was successfully captured. When Te Mautaranui was treacherously killed by Tuakiaki of Ngāti Kahungunu in 1826, Ngāti Awa and Tūhoe called upon the help of Te Whatanui of Ngāti Raukawa and Pōmare and Te Wera of Ngāpuhi to attain revenge. The alliance successfully captured Pohaturoa and Waihau pā, slaughtering their inhabitants and killing Tuakiaki.

In 1829, the rangatira Ngarara plundered the trading ship Haweis, provoking retaliation from other iwi who feared that the attack would jeopardize their access to international trade. Ngāiterangi immediately responded with an attack on Puketapu pā, which Ngāti Awa repelled with the help of a cannon they had captured from the Haweis. The rangatira Te Hana of Ngāpuhi, for his part, simply hitched a ride on the schooner New Zealander and assassinated Ngarara when he came aboard to trade. The New Zealander was also carrying a number of Ngāti Porou passengers, and their mere presence at the scene of the assassination was enough to mobilize Ngāti Awa, Whakatōhea, and Te Whānau-ā-Apanui for a raid against Ngāti Porou at Omuru-iti, where they killed a European trader associated with the iwi. In 1830, Ngāti Maru under Tuterangianini and Te Rohu raided Ngāti Awa territory. In 1834, Ngāti Awa sent forces alongside Whakatōhea and Ngāi Tai to assist Te Whānau-ā-Apanui in the defense of Toka a Kuku pā against Ngāti Porou, Ngāpuhi, and Rongowhakaata. Although this relief force was badly mauled by Te Wera of Ngāpuhi and Kakatarau of Rongowhakaata at Puremutahuri Stream, the defenders nonetheless held the pā.

Ngāti Awa initially had good trading relations with European settlers. However, the New Zealand Wars of the 1860s resulted in the British Crown confiscating more than 1,000 km^{2} of Ngāti Awa land.

For more than a century afterwards, Ngāti Awa remained an aggrieved, struggling people. However, in 1999, the Waitangi Tribunal determined that the confiscation of Ngāti Awa land in the New Zealand Wars by the British Crown was illegal, and in 2003 a settlement was reached between Ngāti Awa and the New Zealand Government.

In the nineteenth century Ngāti Pūkeko were considered a separate iwi, but they are currently considered a hapū of Ngāti Awa.

=== Government settlement ===
In 2003, following almost ten years of negotiations between the New Zealand Government and Ngāti Awa, a settlement was announced and reparations were made to the iwi. In summary:

- The New Zealand Government (the Crown) acknowledged and apologised for the illegal confiscation of Ngāti Awa land during the New Zealand Wars
- The Crown paid NZ$42.39 million in reparations to Ngāti Awa
- The Crown agreed to return control of seven sites of historical and cultural significance to the iwi
- Three locations were renamed to their original Ngāti Awa place names.

On settlement the Ngāti Awa Research Centre that was established in 1989 to generate research for the Waitangi Tribunal claim became Ngāti Awa Research and Archives.

== Hapū and marae ==
=== Whakatāne hapū ===
The following hapū are based around Whakatāne and Coastlands:

- Ngāti Hokopū, based at Te Hokowhitu a Tū ki te Rāhui marae and Te Hokowhitu a Tūmatauenga wharenui, and at Te Whare o Toroa marae
- Ngāti Wharepaia, based at Te Hokowhitu a Tū ki te Rāhui marae and Te Hokowhitu a Tūmatauenga wharenui and Te Whare o Toroa marae
- Te Patuwai Hapu based at Pupuaruhe marae, Whakatāne and Motiti Island
- Warahoe, based at Tokitareke marae and Te Puna o Te Orohi wharenui
- Ngāi Te Rangihouhiri II, based at Te Rangihouhiri II marae
- Ngāi Taiwhakaea II, based at Taiwhakaea marae and Taiwhakaea II wharenui

=== Poroporo hapū ===
The following hapū are based around Poroporo and Paroa:

- Ngāti Pūkeko, based at Pūkeko marae
- Ngāti Rangataua, based at Rangataua marae
- Ngāti Tamapare, based at Rewatu marae and Ueimua wharenui
- Te Whānau o Tariao Tapuke, based at Rangimarie marae and Rarawhati wharenui
- Ngāti Hikakino, based at Puawairua marae

=== Te Teko hapū ===
The following hapū are based around Te Teko and Edgecumbe:

- Ngā Maihi, based at Tūteao marae
- Ngāi Tamaoki, based at Ruaihona marae
- Ngāi Tamawera, based at Uiraroa marae
- Ngāti Hāmua, based at Te Māpou marae and Rongotangiawa wharenui
- Te Pahipoto, based at Kokohinau (Tuhimata) marae and Oruatapare wharenui
- Tuariki, based at Tuariki marae
- Te Kahupāke, based in the area of Te Teko

=== Matatā and Motiti hapū ===
The following hapū are based around Matatā and on Mōtītī Island:

- Te Tāwera, based at Iramoko marae and Te Paetata wharenui, in Matatā
- Te Patuwai me Ngāti Maumoana, based at Te Hinga o te Ra marae, and at Te Rua Kopiha marae and Tamatea ki te Huatahi wharenui, on Motiti Island

=== Urban hapū ===
The following urban hapū are affiliated with Ngāti Awa:

- Ngāti Awa ki Poneke, based at Te Tumu Herenga Waka marae at Victoria University in Wellington
- Ngāti Awa ki Tāmaki Makaurau, based at Mātaatua marae and Awanuiarangi wharenui, at Māngere in Auckland

== Governance ==
=== Te Rūnanga o Ngāti Awa ===
Te Rūnanga o Ngāti Awa became the new governing body of the iwi in 2005. Representatives from the Rūnanga were responsible for negotiating the settlement with the government on behalf of Ngāti Awa. Based in Whakatāne, the rūnanga manages the financial assets of the iwi, and promotes cultural, educational and economic development in the region.

The trust manages the tribe's Treaty of Waitangi settlement under the Ngāti Awa Claims Settlement Act and is a body corporate for the tribe's land, under Te Runanga o Ngāti Awa Act. It represents the iwi in aquaculture and fisheries under the Māori Commercial Aquaculture Claims Settlement Act, and represents the iwi during resource consent consultation under the Resource Management Act. The trust is governed by one representative from each of the 22 hapū, and is based in Whakatāne.

=== Local government ===
The tribal area of the iwi is within the territory of Kawerau District Council and Whakatāne District Council.

It is also within the wider territory of the Bay of Plenty Regional Council.

== Media ==
=== Sun FM ===
Sun FM is the radio station for Ngāti Awa. It was first known as Te Reo Irirangi o Te Manuka Tutāhi during a three-week AM trial run in 1990. It went to air as Tumeke FM on 6 April 1991, became Sun FM in 1994 to increase its advertising appeal, and between 1996 and 1999 worked to increase its Māori language content. The classic hits station broadcasts on 106.5 FM in Whakatāne.

== Notable people ==
- Wepiha Apanui
- Leni Apisai
- Marlene J Bennetts
- Mere Broughton
- Catherine Carran
- Tāmati Coffey
- Samuel Horouta Emery
- Wira Gardiner
- Ngapiki Hakaraia
- Joe Harawira
- Matekoraha Te Peehi Jaram
- Georgina Kingi
- Karl Leonard
- Eruera Riini Mānuera
- Hamiora Tumutara Te Tihi-o-te-whenua Pio
- Dan Pryor
- Kara Pryor
- Linda Tuhiwai Smith
- Albert Oliphant Stewart
- Te Hura Te Taiwhakaripi
- Maata Te Taiawatea Rangitūkehu
- Eruera Hamiora Tumutara
- Gugi Waaka
- Te Kari Waaka
- Carin Wilson

== See also ==
- List of iwi
- Ngā Mānawa
