= Lake Tarawera =

Lake in New Zealand

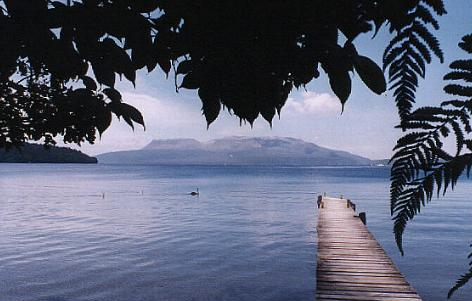
- Lake Tarawera

- Location within New Zealand Location within North Island

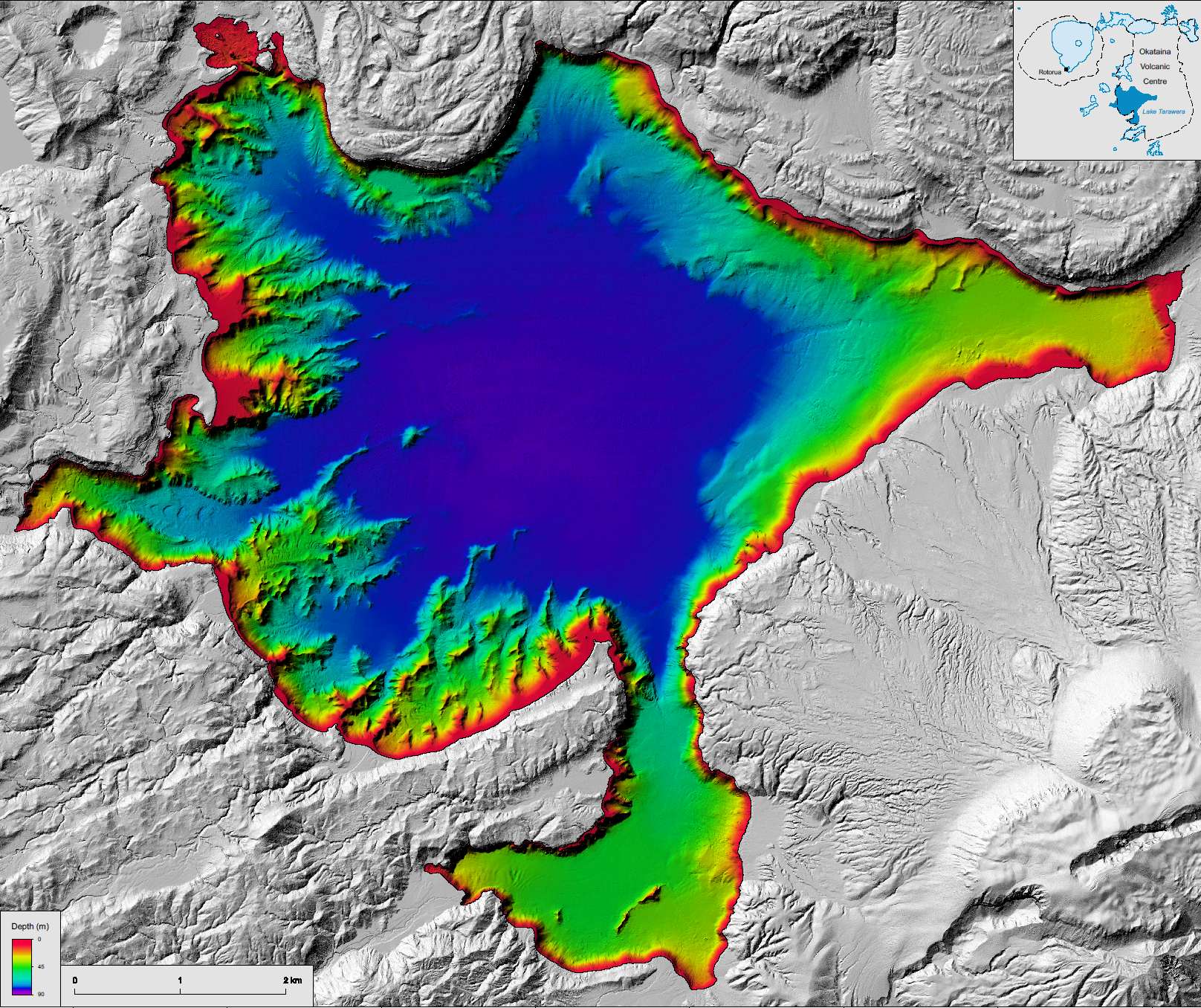
- Bathymetric map of Lake Tarawera
- Location: Rotorua Lakes, Bay of Plenty Region, North Island
- Coordinates: 38°12′S 176°27′E
- Lake type: volcanic
- Primary inflows: Tarawera Peak Stream, Te Whekau Stream, Orchard Stream, Spencer Road Ford Stream multiple springs and subsurface
- Primary outflows: Tarawera River and subsurface
- Catchment area: 143.8 km^{2} (55.5 sq mi)
- Basin countries: New Zealand
- Max. length: 11.4 km (7.1 mi)
- Max. width: 9.0 km (5.6 mi)
- Surface area: 41.0 km^{2} (15.8 sq mi)
- Average depth: 57.0 m (187.0 ft)
- Max. depth: 87.5 m (287 ft)
- Surface elevation: 298 m (978 ft)

Lake Tarawera is the largest of a series of lakes which surround the volcano Mount Tarawera in the North Island of New Zealand. Like the mountain, it lies within the Ōkataina Caldera. It is located 18 kilometres (11 mi) to the east of Rotorua, and beneath the peaks of the Tarawera massif i.e. Wahanga, Ruawahia, Tarawera and Koa. Tarawera means "Burnt Spear", named by a visiting hunter who left his bird spears in a hut and on returning the following season found that both his spears and hut had been turned to ashes.

== Geography ==
Lake Tarawera is 298 m (978 ft) above sea level, and has a surface area of 41 km^{2} (16 sq mi). To the north-west is Lake Ōkataina, to the west as you go south, lakes Ōkāreka, Tikitapu and Rotokākahi and to the south-east Lake Rotomahana. Lake Tarawera township is on the western shore, between Lake Tarawera and Lake Ōkāreka. The main road access is from Rotorua to the west.

The lake was substantially affected by the eruption of Mount Tarawera on 10 June 1886 to the lake's east. There were changes in lake level and sediment carriage.

The lake has a large catchment. This includes Lake Tarawera's immediate catchment, being 143.8 km^{2} (55.5 sq mi) in area, and the catchment of the nearby higher lakes, being a total of 380.9 km^{2} (147.1 sq mi), with an estimated mean annual precipitation of 20,001 L/s (706.3 cu ft/s).

=== Water flow ===
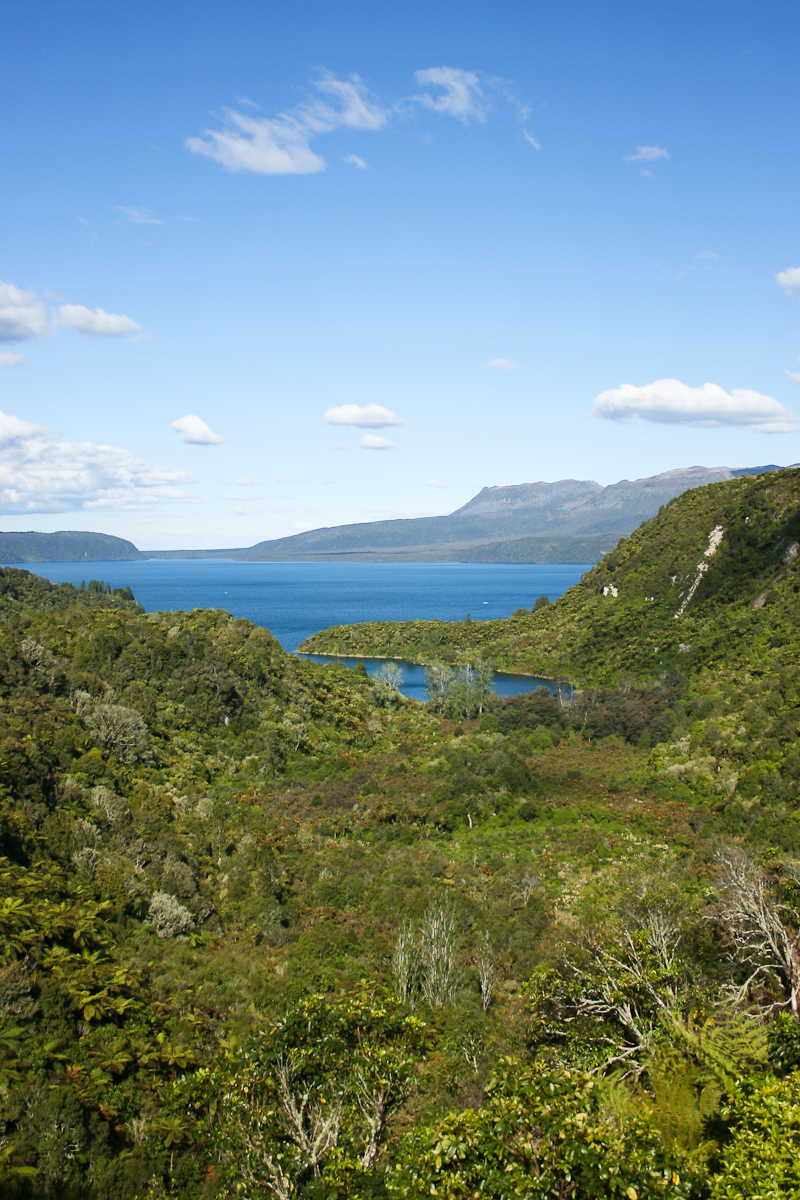
The deep blue of Lake Tarawera on a fine day.

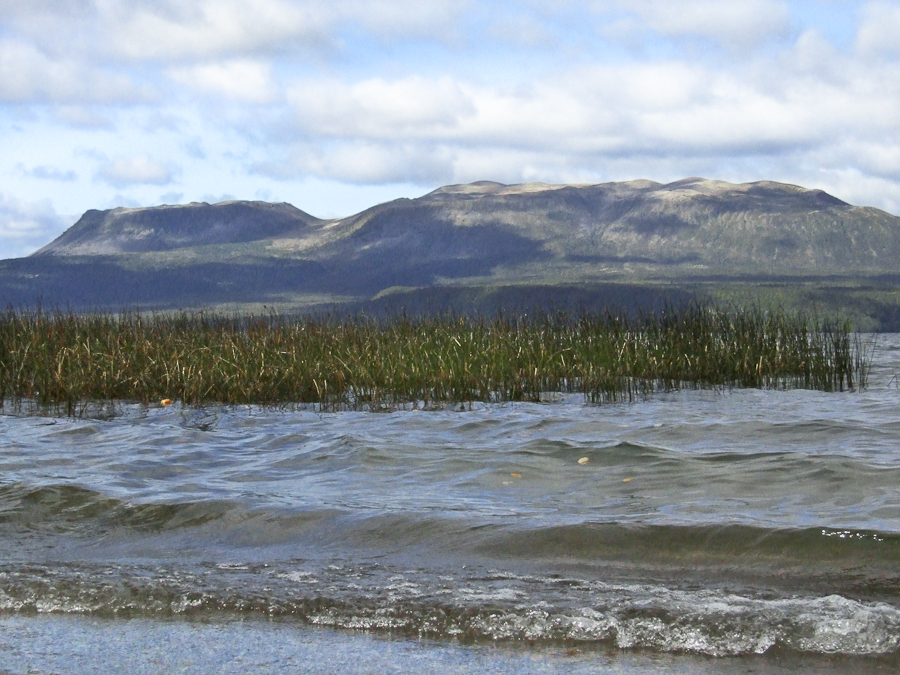
Lake Tarawera, with Mount Tarawera standing behind it

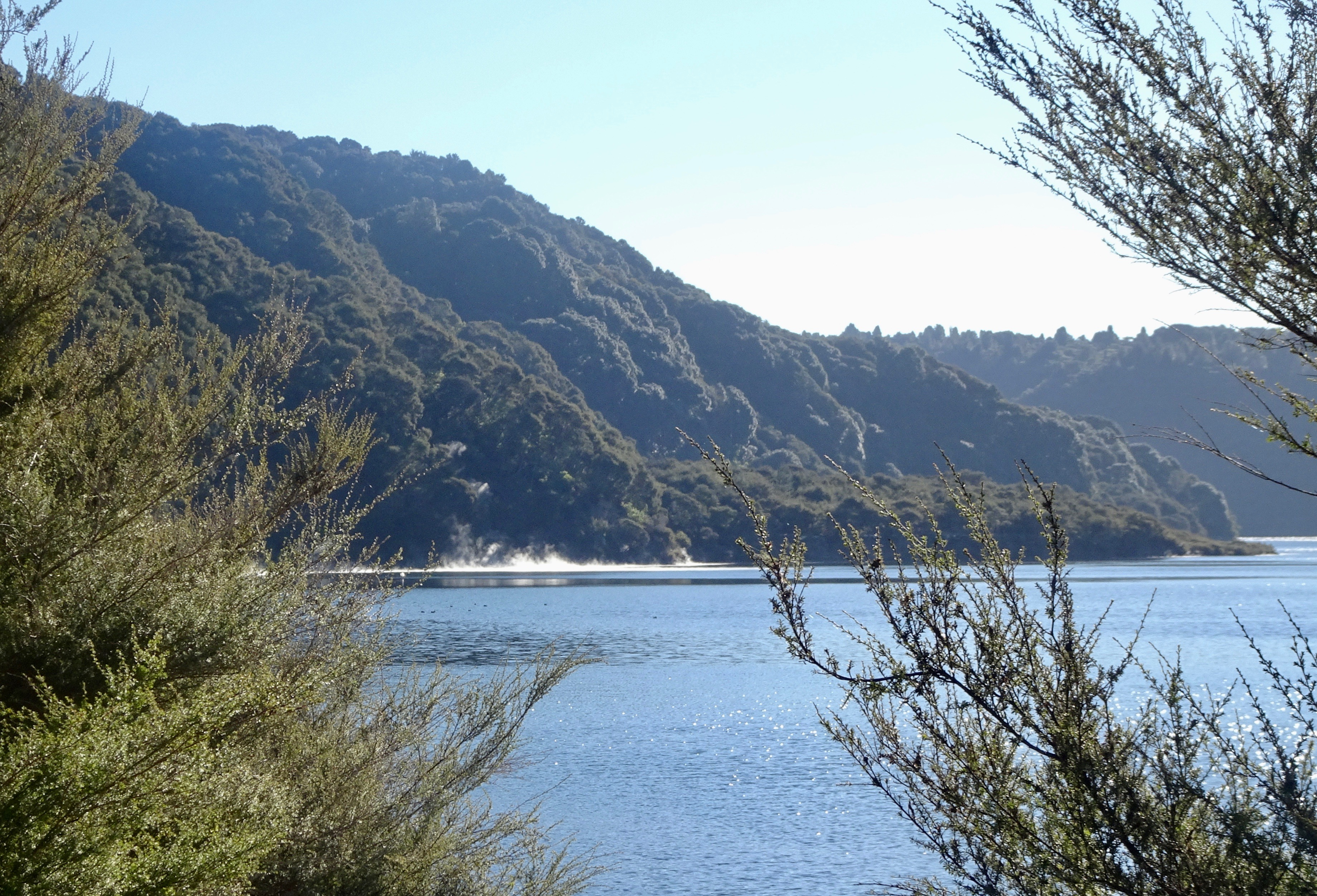
Steam rising from Hot Water Beach, Te Rata Bay, as viewed from Tarawera Track

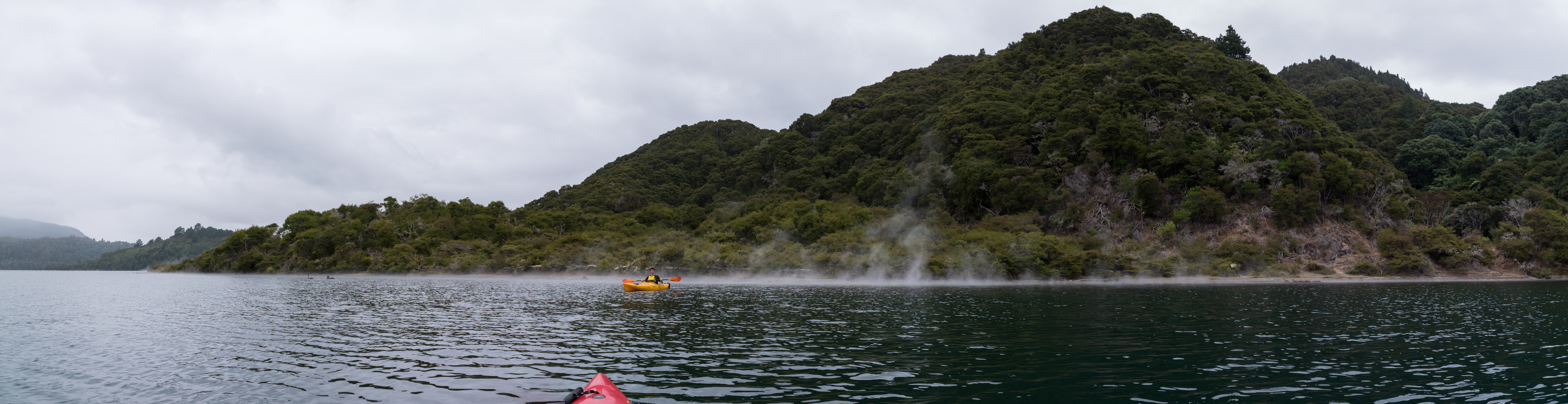
Lake Tarawera Hot Water Beach from a boat 2017

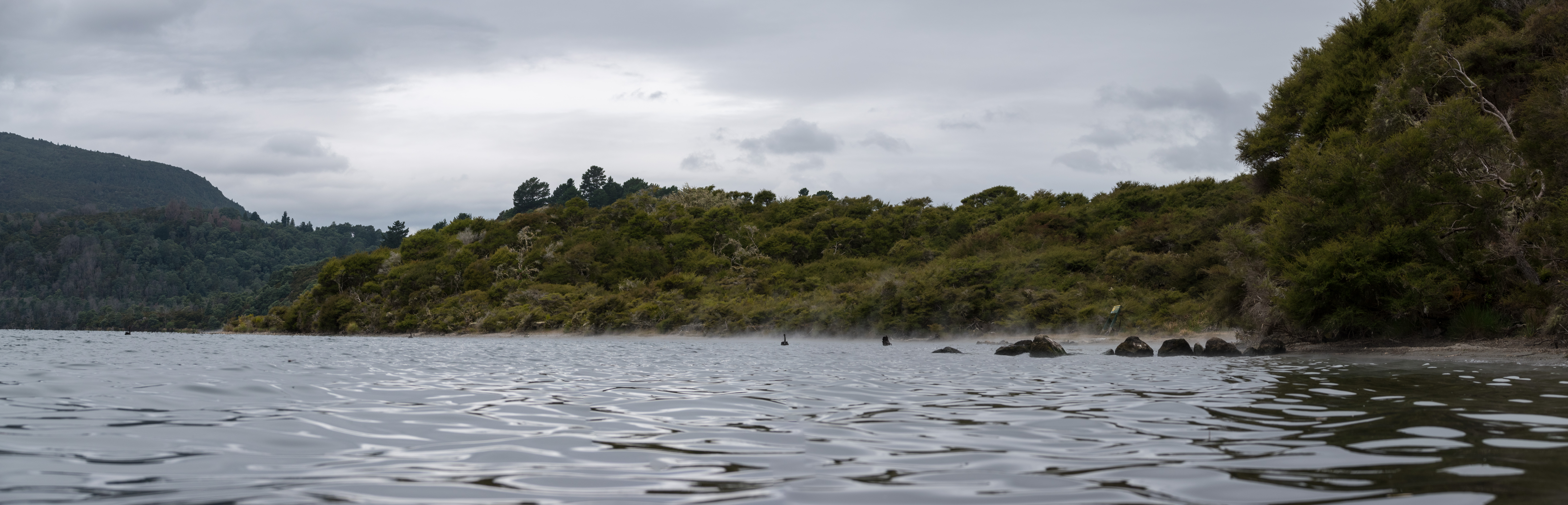
Shoreline native forest (bush) Lake Tarawera in 2017

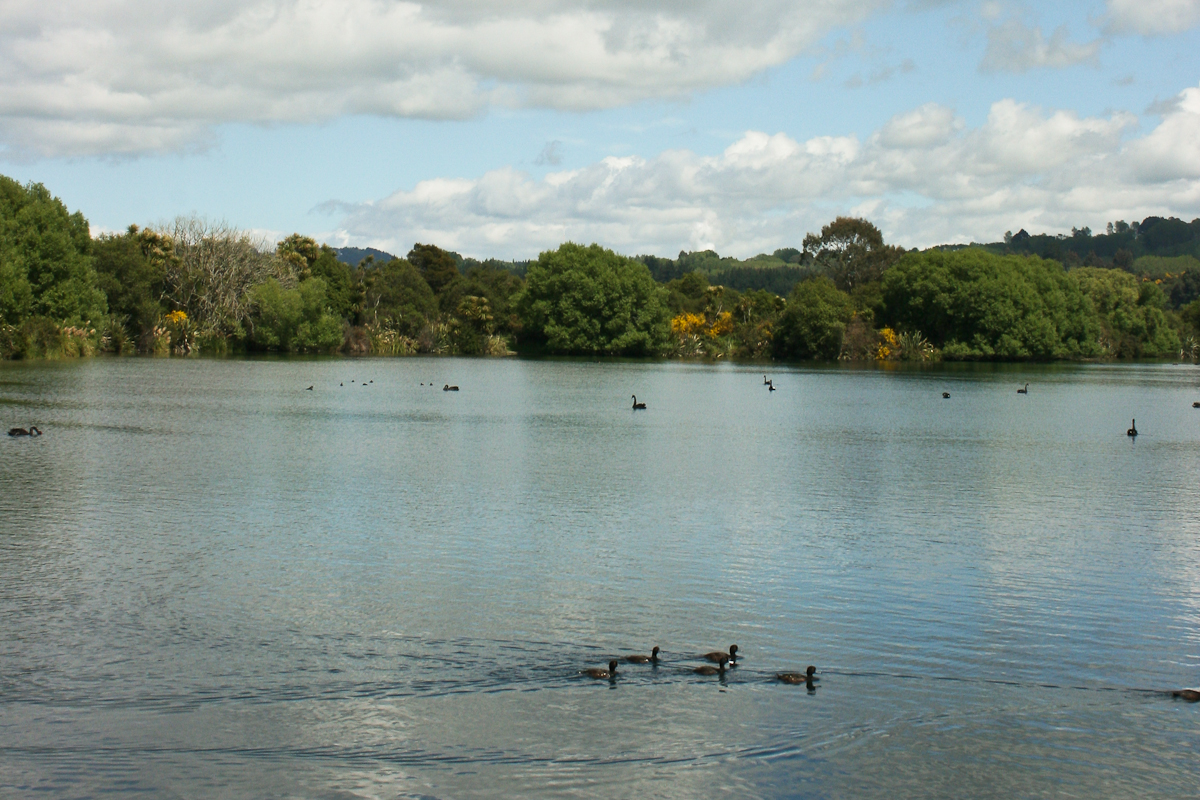
Ducks and swans on Lake Tarawera in 2007

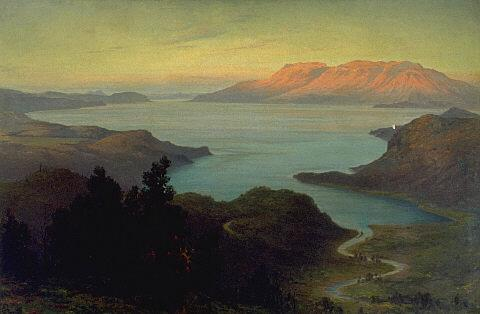
Edward Payton – Tarawera Mountain and Lake – 1924

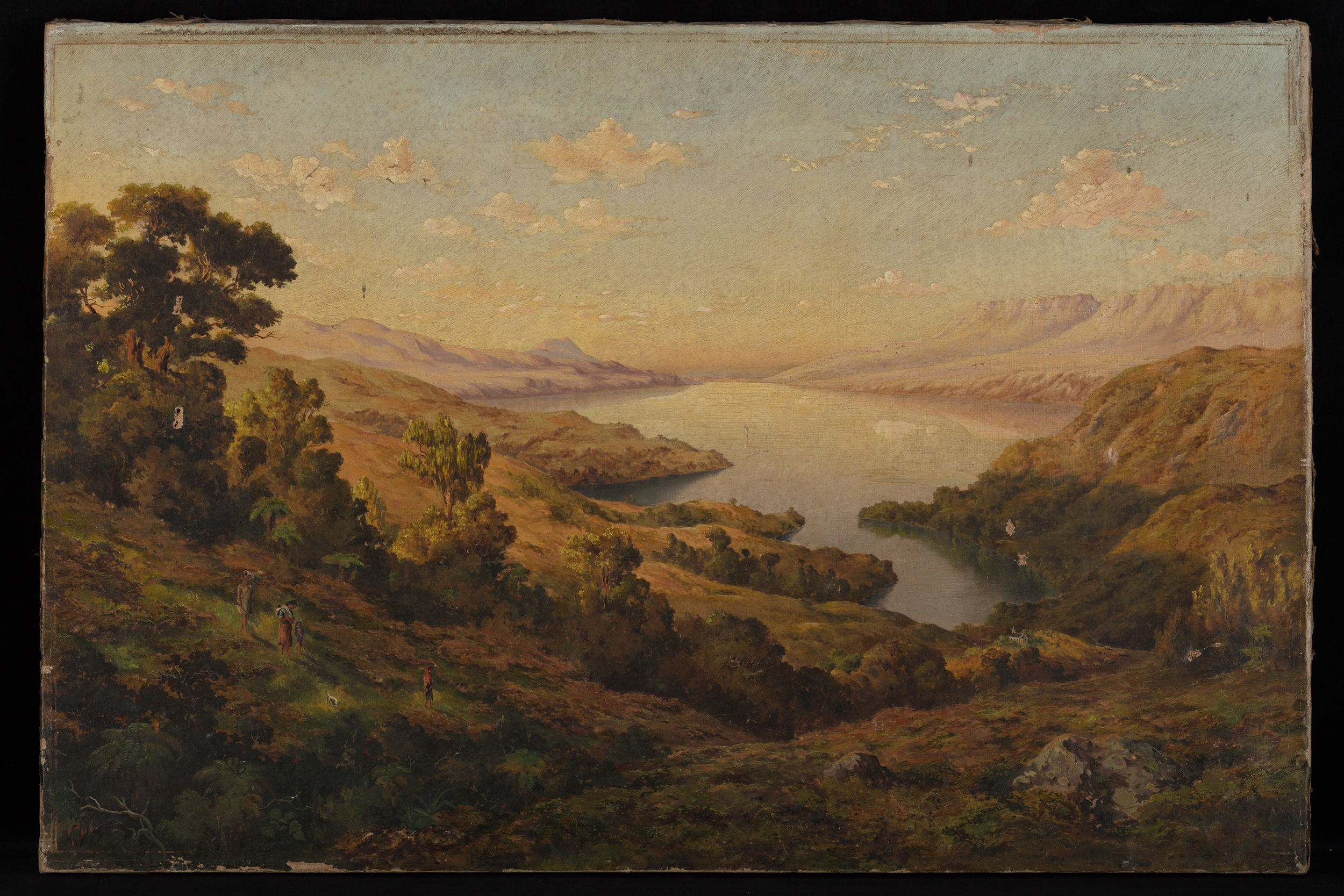
Wairoa, Lake Tarawera ca. 1880 Kennett Watkins

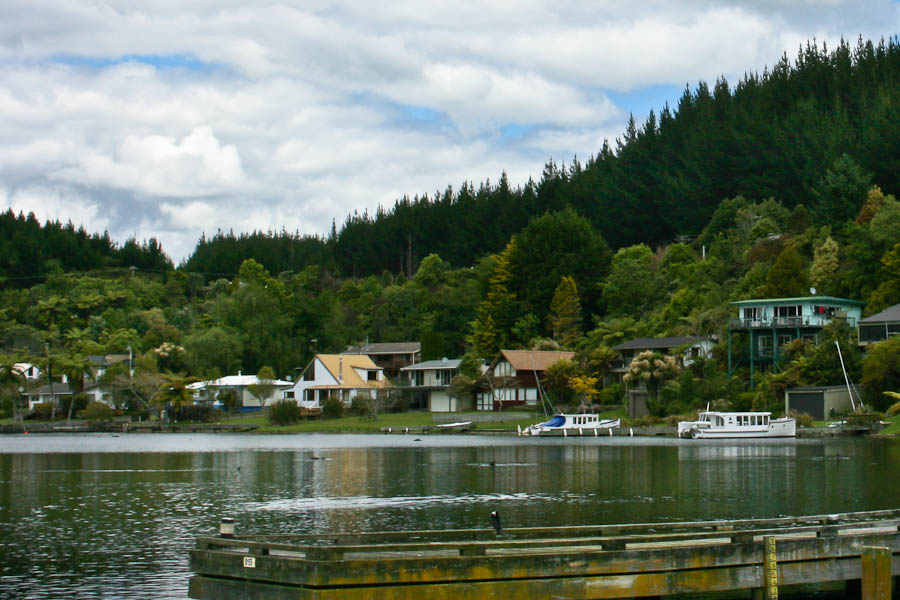
Lake Tarawera township in 2011

Lake Tarawera is filled primarily by water flowing through the volcanic rocks and ashes, only about 42% being from water flowing in streams, etc. The mean surface inflows are estimated to be:

Surface water flows to Lake Tarawera
Source	Mean Water Flow	Coordinates
Te Puroku No. 2 (Twin Creeks)	384 L/s (13.6 cu ft/s)	38°13′23″S 176°24′13″E
Wairoa Stream	347 L/s (12.3 cu ft/s)	38°12′29″S 176°22′31″E
Wairua Stream	208 L/s (7.3 cu ft/s)	38°14′24″S 176°25′28″E
Waterfall	174 L/s (6.1 cu ft/s)	38°14′21″S 176°27′17″E
Waitangi Stream	164 L/s (5.8 cu ft/s)	38°10′37″S 176°23′5″E
Te Puroku No. 1 (Twin Creeks)	123 L/s (4.3 cu ft/s)	38°13′23″S 176°24′13″E
Te Toroa	91 L/s (3.2 cu ft/s)	38°12′15″S 176°23′4″E
Camp Site	65 L/s (2.3 cu ft/s)	38°14′3″S 176°27′17″E
The Landing drain 1	32 L/s (1.1 cu ft/s)	38°12′24″S 176°22′38″E
Te Whekau Stream	20 L/s (0.71 cu ft/s)	38°10′1″S 176°23′36″E
Orchard Stream	16 L/s (0.57 cu ft/s)	38°12′18″S 176°22′38″E
Ungauged sites in Kotukutuku Bay	10 L/s (0.35 cu ft/s)	-
Ungauged sites in SE of lake	10 L/s (0.35 cu ft/s)	-
Waitangui Spring	4 L/s (0.14 cu ft/s)	38°10′28″S 176°23′24″E
Spencer Rd Ford Stream	1.5 L/s (0.053 cu ft/s)	38°9′52″S 176°23′35″E

Thus surface water inflows contribute 1,649.5 L/s (58.25 cu ft/s) which is less than the 2,358 L/s (83.3 cu ft/s) rainfall on the lake surface itself and much less than either the estimated total outflow from the lake approaching 10,000 L/s (350 cu ft/s). Therefore there is a fair subsurface inflow into the lake.

Catchment	Inflow
Tarawera	8,494 L/s (300.0 cu ft/s)
Rotomahana	1,128 L/s (39.8 cu ft/s)
Okareka	752 L/s (26.6 cu ft/s)
Okataina	625 L/s (22.1 cu ft/s)
Rotokakahi	559 L/s (19.7 cu ft/s)
Tikitapu	103 L/s (3.6 cu ft/s)

Catchment inflows to Lake Tarawera

An estimate has been made of total inflows both surface and subsurface from the surrounding lake catchments

The main hot water sources are in the southern section of the lake at the Wairua Stream, Hot Water Beach and Te Puha and Tarawera fumaroles. There is also a small geothermal area at Humphrey's Bay, to the south of Lake Ōkataina. Water varies between 37 °C (99 °F) and 90 °C (194 °F). Lake Tarawera's outflow at its north east end, has been heavily influenced by the local geology, with a mean 7 m^{3}/s (250 cu ft/s) discharged on the surface into the Tarawera River, which flows north-east into the Bay of Plenty. An estimate of subsurface outflow has been made by measuring flow below Tarawera Falls where total river flow has increased to 9.9 m^{3}/s (350 cu ft/s).

=== Geology ===
Lake Tarawera has been modified by eruptions within the Ōkataina Caldera, most recently the 1314 ± 12 CE Kaharoa eruption and the 10 June 1886 eruption. Its current outlet control is where Tapahoro lava flows created by the 5526 ± 145 BP Whakatane eruption run into a 14,009 ± 155 BP Pokohu lava flow which the Tarawera River flows across in a 10 m (33 ft) wide channel. Before the Whakatane eruption it is thought the lake had a lower level than at present. Immediately after the Whakatane eruption its level increased by at least 100 m (330 ft) with gradual cutting down and Taupō Rift subsidence to a level just before the 1314 Kaharoa eruption of 17 m (56 ft) above present lake levels. The 1314 eruption blocked the outlet in a temporary dam to a temporary lake height of 32 m (105 ft) above present lake levels, which was subsequently eroded with a great flood at one stage, to reach by the time of European settlement first surveys 8 m (26 ft) below present lake level.

The lake outlet was blocked for two decades after the 1886 eruption and the lake level increased to a maximum of 12.8 m (42 ft) above its present level. The eruption killed over 120 people, and buried the Māori village of Te Wairoa on the southwest shore of the lake. The last major decrease in lake level occurred in a flood of 1904 down the Tarawera River valley after the new volcanic material dam first broke on 1 November 1904. The main flood surge on 3 November 1904 was assessed at a peak flow of 700 m^{3}/s (25,000 cu ft/s). After 1906 it is now known that the main change in lake level relative to reference sea level would have been due to the slow subsidence of this area of the Taupō Rift. This rate can be estimated to have been about 1.5 m (4 ft 11 in) in 100 years from the nearest NZ Geonet station RGTA data which has been operative since November 2007 and shows a linear trend in height decrease since then.

Also assumed destroyed were the nearly famed Pink and White Terraces which were located to the south of the lake and accessed via boat across the lake and the old Lake Rotomahana. However, in February 2011 a team mapping the lake floor discovered what appeared to be part of the Pink Terraces. The lowest two tiers of the terraces were reportedly found in their original place at 60 metres (200 ft) deep (too deep for scuba diving without special gas gear). Subsequently, a portion of the White Terraces was reportedly rediscovered in June 2011. The announcement of the rediscovery of the White Terraces coincided with the 125th anniversary of the eruption of Mt. Tarawera in 1886. It was thought that the rest of the terraces may be buried in sediment rather than having been destroyed. More recent research question these earlier findings and reports the Pink and White terrace spring sites instead lie on land (along with a lesser-known Black Terrace spring). As of 2023 no sample of any terrace has been recovered, so any claim of survival of any of the terrace formations is unproven.

== Ecology ==
Lake Tarawera is classified as mesotrophic, with a trophic level index of 3.0 in 2014 which was a decline.

The native bush has regenerated since the 1886 eruption.

== Recreational ==
Lake Tarawera is home to eels and rainbow trout. During the summer it is popular for both fishing and water sports, and also camping as there a number of hot water beaches. Much of the more inaccessible lake shore is part of the Lake Tarawera Scenic Reserve with hunting permits possible. There are multiple popular walking trails with access to thermal features and rock paintings, often without a permit.

== Lake Tarawera township ==
The township on the shores of Lake Tarawera is described by Statistics New Zealand as a rural settlement, and covers 4.50 km^{2} (1.74 sq mi). It had an estimated population of 240 as of June 2025, with a population density of 53 people per km^{2}. Lake Tarawere township is part of the larger Kaingaroa-Whakarewarewa statistical area.

Historical population
Year	Pop.	±% p.a.
2006	270	—
2013	207	−3.72%
2018	267	+5.22%
2023	237	−2.36%

The township had a population of 237 in the 2023 New Zealand census, a decrease of 30 people (−11.2%) since the 2018 census, and an increase of 30 people (14.5%) since the 2013 census. There were 126 males and 111 females in 135 dwellings. 1.3% of people identified as LGBTIQ+. The median age was 57.2 years (compared with 38.1 years nationally). There were 24 people (10.1%) aged under 15 years, 24 (10.1%) aged 15 to 29, 114 (48.1%) aged 30 to 64, and 75 (31.6%) aged 65 or older.

People could identify as more than one ethnicity. The results were 93.7% European (Pākehā); 10.1% Māori; 5.1% Asian; 1.3% Middle Eastern, Latin American and African New Zealanders (MELAA); and 2.5% other, which includes people giving their ethnicity as "New Zealander". English was spoken by 98.7%, Māori by 1.3%, Samoan by 1.3%, and other languages by 10.1%. No language could be spoken by 1.3% (e.g. too young to talk). The percentage of people born overseas was 19.0, compared with 28.8% nationally.

Religious affiliations were 29.1% Christian, and 1.3% other religions. People who answered that they had no religion were 55.7%, and 13.9% of people did not answer the census question.

Of those at least 15 years old, 69 (32.4%) people had a bachelor's or higher degree, 117 (54.9%) had a post-high school certificate or diploma, and 30 (14.1%) people exclusively held high school qualifications. The median income was $43,600, compared with $41,500 nationally. 39 people (18.3%) earned over $100,000 compared to 12.1% nationally. The employment status of those at least 15 was 96 (45.1%) full-time, 45 (21.1%) part-time, and 3 (1.4%) unemployed.
