= Whakairo =

Traditional Māori form of art carving

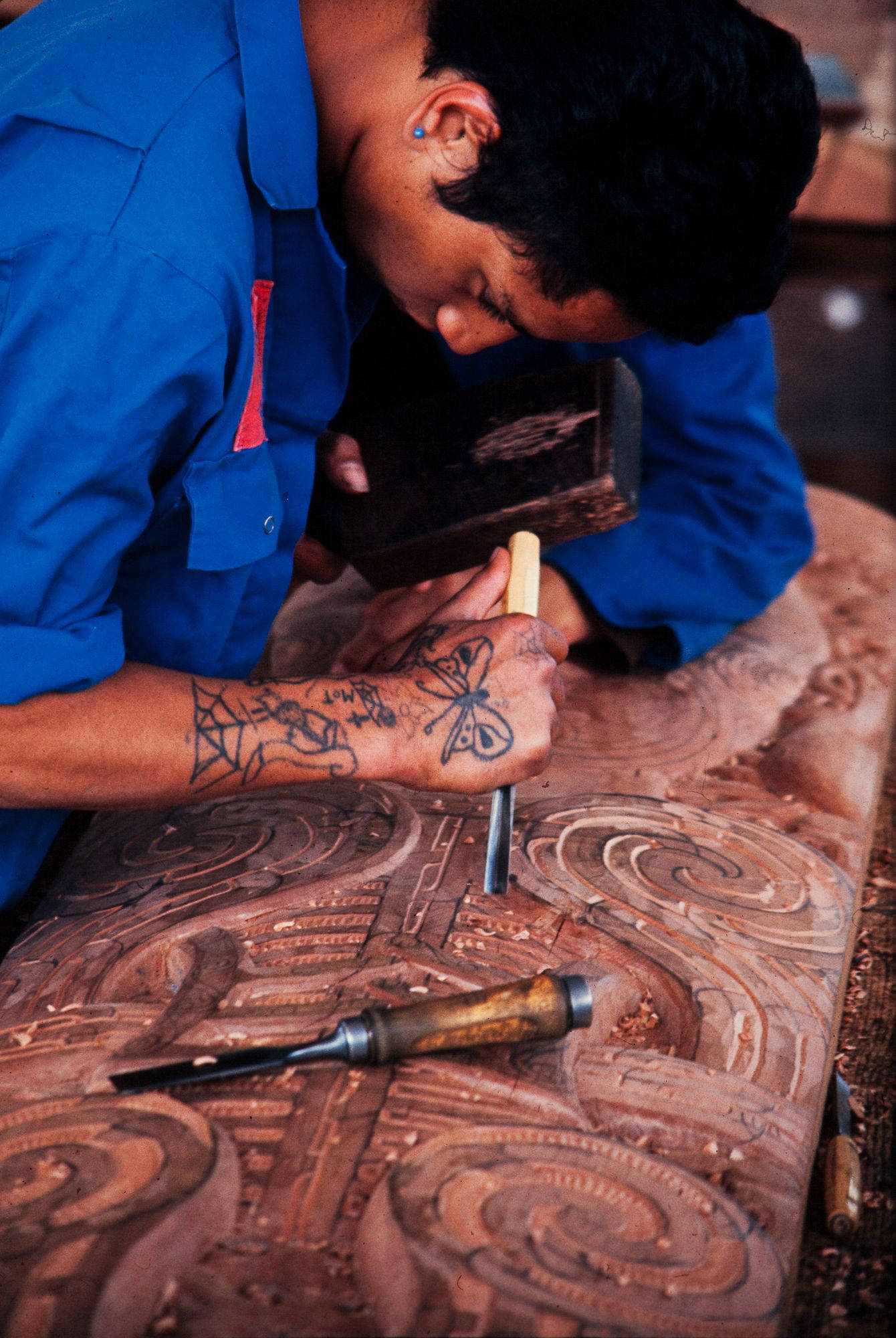
Carver working at Te Wānanga Whakairo of the New Zealand Māori Arts and Crafts Institute in 1982

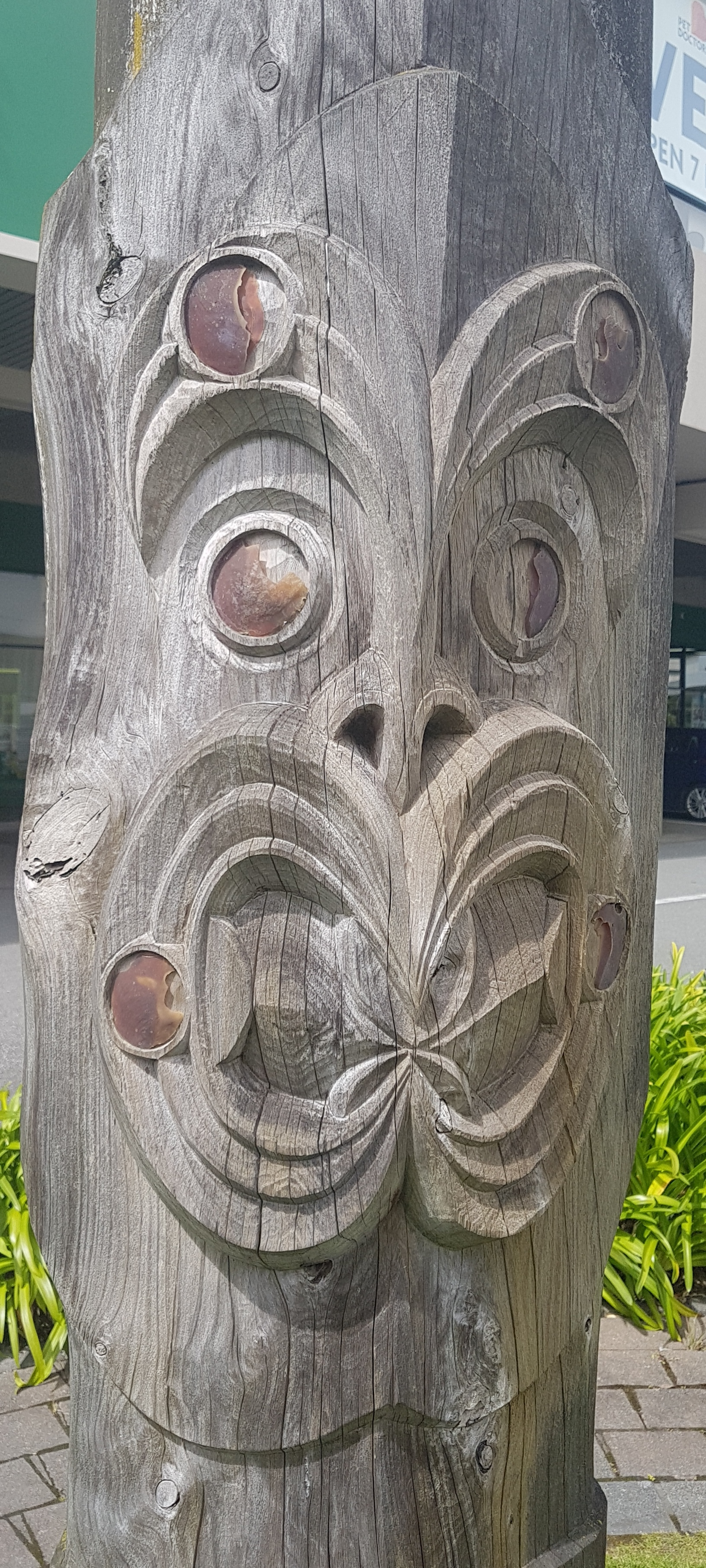
Pouwhenua carved by Eruera Te Whiti Nia and dedicated to the Māori Battalion (1996)

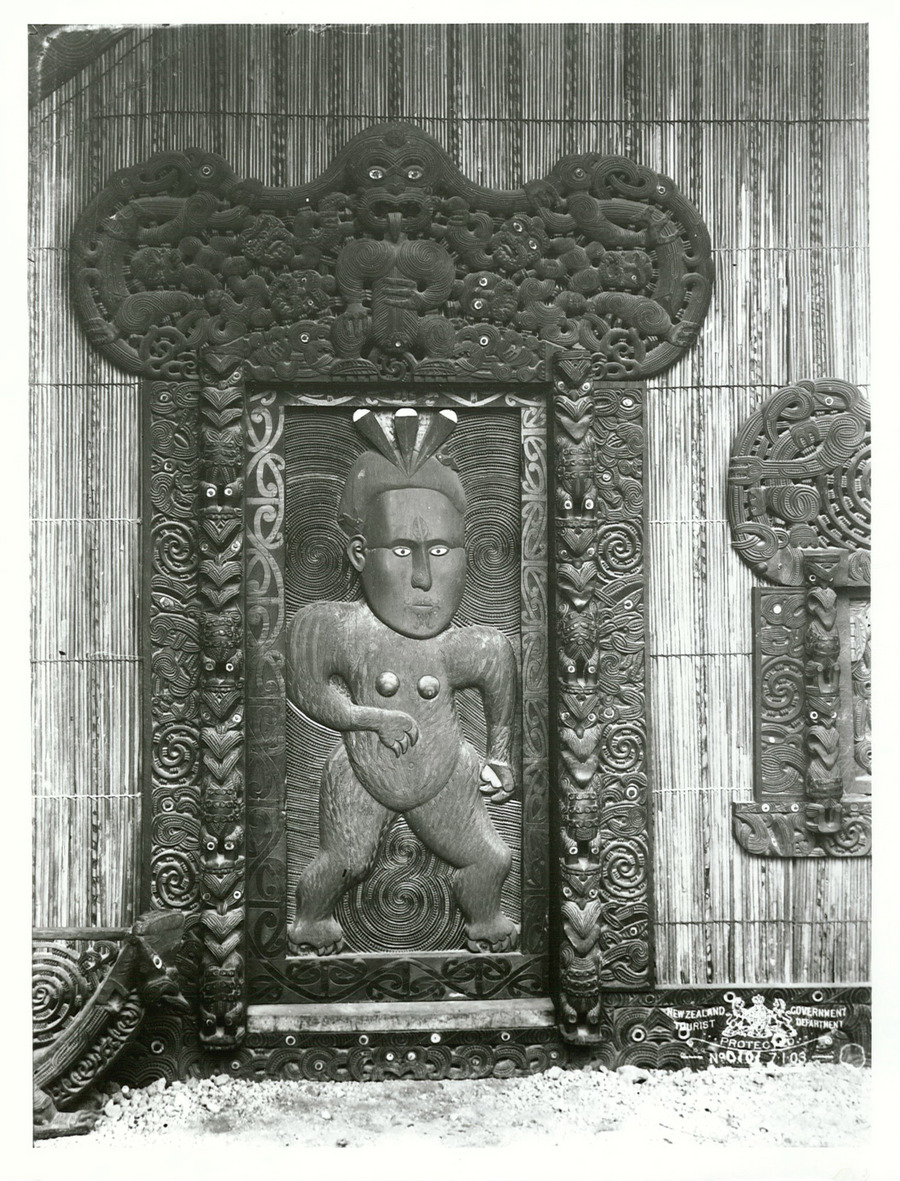
Carved doorway in the porch of Rauru, a wharenui (meetinghouse)

Toi whakairo (art carving) or just whakairo (carving) is a Māori traditional art of carving in wood, stone or bone.

== History ==
Timber was formed into houses, fencepoles, pouwhenua, containers, taiaha, tool handles and waka (canoe). Carving tools were made from stone, preferably the very hard pounamu (greenstone). Bone was used for fish hooks and needles amongst other things. Designs on carvings depict tribal ancestors, and are often important for establishing iwi and hapu identity.

After European contact, many traditionally carved items were no longer widely produced in favour of using Western counterparts, such as waka huia treasure containers being replaced with lockable seaman's chests by the 1840s. Traditionally, many expert carvers focused on creating elaborate waka taua (war canoes), however this declined during the 1860s when waka taua were superseded by whaleboats or small European style sailing ships. During the decline, carvers focused instead on carved marae, objects such as tokotoko, or carved aspects of buildings such as churches. Most traditions that survived this period into the late 1800s were centred around communal whakairo schools, mostly located around Rotorua, Te Urewera, the Whanganui River and the East Coast. Carving schools balanced producing art for their own people with commercial works, with many of the most successful being Te Arawa (Ngāti Whakaue, Ngāti Pikiao and Ngāti Tarāwhai), located near Rotorua, during the tourism boom to the area in the 1870s, with an increased need for carved works such as the model village at Whakarewarewa, and souvenirs.

The Māori Arts and Crafts Institute at Whakarewarewa in Rotorua, opened by Sir Āpirana Ngata in 1926, is a stronghold of traditional carving skills. Ngata put arts as a 'vital part' of the rejuvenation of Māori culture. Hōne Taiapa was head of this school for some time. Since the Māori Renaissance in the 1960s there has been a resurgence of whakairo, alongside other traditional Māori practices, and an expansion into contemporary art. Many carvers express their practices in explicitly spiritual terms. The Māori Art Market (funded by the state-sponsored Toi Māori Aotearoa) is a significant venue for the promotion and sale of whakairo.

== Features ==
Wooden Māori carvings are often painted to pick out features. Before modern paints were available this was often a mixture of kōkōwai (red ochre) and shark-liver oil. This was thought to preserve the carvings and also imbue them with a tapu (sacred) status. Following the introduction of metal tools there was a substantial increase in decorative ornamentation, particularly in wood and bone carving.

== Notable carvers ==
- Wero Tāroi (c. 1810–1880)
- Eramiha Neke Kapua (1867–1955)
- Piri Poutapu (1905–1975)
- Hori Pukehika (d. 1932)
- Raharuhi Rukupo (d. 1873)
- Hone Taiapa (1911–1979)
- Pine Taiapa (1901–1972)
- Inia Te Wiata (1915–1971)
- Tene Waitere (1853–1931)
- Pakariki Harrison (1928–2008)
- Thomas Aubrey Chappé Hall (1873–1958)

Te Papa and Auckland Art Gallery have substantial holdings of whakairo, with Te Papa in particular having many digitised in their Collections online website.
