= Edna Pahewa =

New Zealand weaver

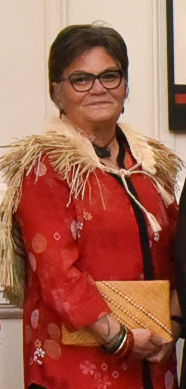
- Born: 1954; New Zealand
- Known for: Weaving & being the Head of Weaving (Tumu o Raranga) of the New Zealand Māori Arts and Crafts Institute
- Mother: Emily Schuster
- Relatives: Dawn Smith (sister)

Edna Pahewa (born 1954) is a New Zealand weaver and was the head of weaving (Tumu Raranga) at Te Rito, the weaving school of the New Zealand Māori Arts and Crafts Institute, for 18 years. Her work is held in the permanent collection of Te Papa.

== Biography ==
Pahewa began weaving as a child when she was taught by her Nanny Bub, the younger sister of Rangitīaria Dennan. Pahewa's mother, Emily Schuster, was a renowned weaver, as was Pahewa's twin sister Dawn Smith, and both women influenced Pahewa. Pahewa was also taught by Diggeress Te Kanawa.

Pahewa has taught weaving at Te Papa o Te Aroha and Te Wananga o Aotearoa, both in Tokoroa. Pahewa was the head of the New Zealand Māori Arts and Crafts Institute's weaving school, Te Rito, located in Rotorua that her mother Emily Schuster set-up in 1967. Both her mother and her sister Dawn have also held the head role of Te Tumu Raranga at the institute. After 18 years in the role Pahewa was succeeded by Meleta Bennett.

She is a member of Te Roopu Raranga Whatu o Aotearoa, the national collective of weavers, and has previously served as the organisation's chairperson. In 2005 while serving as chairperson, Pahewa helped establish the Kāhui Whiritoi group, membership of which formally acknowledges master weavers of New Zealand. She is currently serving as a committee member for the collective. Pahewa is also associated with Toi Māori Aotearoa, a Māori arts charitable trust.

In 2020 Pahewa was to represent New Zealand at the 13th Festival of Pacific Arts and Culture in Hawai’i. However this festival has been postponed until June 2024.

== Personal life ==
Pahewa affiliates with the iwi Te Arawa, Ngāti Tūwharetoa, and Tuhourangi.
