= Piri Poutapu =

New Zealand Māori carver (1905–1975)

Wiremu "Piri" Te Ranga Poutapu MBE (8 June 1905 – 20 August 1975) was a New Zealand master of Māori carving and a carpenter.

== Biography ==
Poutapu identified with the Ngāti Korokī and Waikato iwi. He was born in 1905, in Maungatautari, Waikato. He was known as Piri, the Māori transliteration of Bill, itself short for William, of which his first name Wiremu is the Māori transliteration.

Poutapu was a protégé of Te Puea Herangi who sent him to the School of Maori Arts and Crafts at Ohinemutu in 1929. He spent three years there learning adzeing, carving and traditional lore from Eramiha Neke Kapua. During this time he also worked with brothers Pine and Hōne Taiapa, leading Ngāti Porou carvers. In 1932 he returned to Ngāruawāhia where he established a carving school. One of his pupils was Inia Te Wiata.

Poutapu was one of the leaders in the building of Turongo, the Māori king's official residence at Turangawaewae Marae, between 1934 and 1938. He was a confidant and secretary to Māori king Korokī Mahuta and was then a member of the Tekau-ma-rua (council of twelve) for Māori queen Te Atairangikaahu.

Some of Poutapu's best known carvings include carvings for Rotorua Boys' High School and Te Aute College, as well as restoring the Te Winika and Ngātokimatawhaorua war canoes. The 1974 National Film Unit documentary Tāhere Tikitiki – The Making of a Māori Canoe records the 18 month long construction of the Taahere Tikitiki, a war canoe (waka taua) that Poutapu worked on.

Poutapu was appointed a Member of the Order of the British Empire, for services to Māori arts and crafts, in the 1974 Queen's Birthday Honours. He died at Turangawaewae Marae on 20 August 1975 and was buried on Mount Taupiri.
