= Clive Fugill =

Māori cultural expert, artist, and author

Clive Fugill CNZM
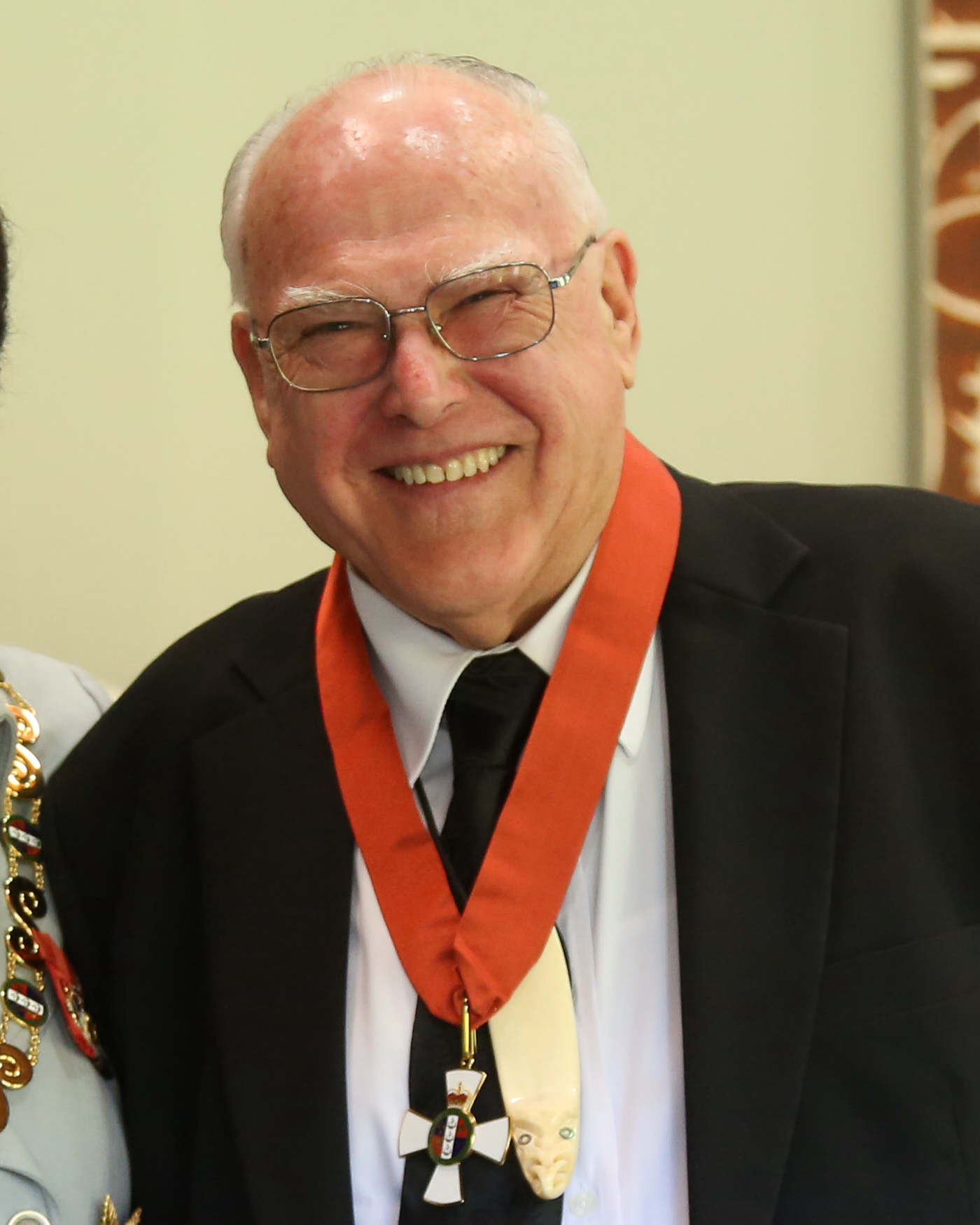
- Fugill in 2024
- Born: 1949 (age 75–76)
- Education: Te Wānanga Whakairo Rākau o Aotearoa
- Alma mater: New Zealand Māori Arts and Crafts Institute
- Occupations: Artist; lecturer; teacher
- Years active: 1959–present
- Notable work: Te Toki me Te Whao; Hoani Waititi Marae; Tutereinga Marae; Te Matatini stage; Hoe urungi
- Style: Whakairo rākau
- Movement: Māori renaissance
- Spouse: Noor

Clive Ernest Fugill CNZM (born 1949) is a New Zealand Māori tohunga whakairo (master carver), author and long serving kaiako whakairo (carving lecturer) of the New Zealand Māori Arts and Crafts Institute. He affiliates to the Ngāti Ranginui iwi of Tauranga, and also has links to Ngāti Raukawa, Ngāti Rangiwewehi and Ngāti Tūkorehe.

== Biography ==
Fugill began carving at the young age of 9 and was accepted as a student in the inaugural class of the New Zealand Māori Arts and Crafts Institute in 1967. The Institute was reconstituted at that time after being closed for over two decades due to the Second World War. He was taught by tohunga whakairo Hone Taiapa.

Through the early years of the NZMACI the focus was on the restoration of churches and marae around New Zealand. The staff and students also carved new work for public areas as Rotorua parks and RSA. This work was a forerunner to the Māori renaissance that followed in the 1970s and 1980s. Fugill continued at the institute throughout this period as a senior graduate helping to prepare artworks for over 40 Māori wharenui (meeting houses).

Fugill has served as tōhunga whakairo and Tumu Whakarae of Te Wānanga Whakairo Rākau o Aotearoa (The National Woodcarving School) at NZMACI since 1983.

=== Authorship ===
Fugill’s first published book, Te Toki Me Te Whao, describes traditional Māori tools and techniques and was published in 2016 by Oratia. It is the only book on the subject by a recognised practicing tohunga whakairo.

=== Awards and appointments ===
Fugill has been appointed to represent whakairo on New Zealand artistic governance boards including Te Waka Toi (Creative New Zealand) and Te Puia/NZMACI board.

In 2019, Fugill was awarded the John Britten Black Pin of the New Zealand Designers association for lifetime achievement in the fields of art and design.

In 2022, Fugill was honoured by his tribes at the Ngā Tohu Toi Awards in Tauranga. The citation noted his contribution to "transforming the visual experience of Māori". He commented that it "holds even more significance coming from your own people".

In the 2024 New Year Honours, Fugill was appointed a Companion of the New Zealand Order of Merit, for services to Māori art.
