= New Zealand Māori Arts and Crafts Institute =

Art school in Rotorua, New Zealand

Coordinates: 38.164°S 176.250°E

- Logo
- Other name: Te Puia
- Motto: Ngā Kete Tuku Iho
- Motto in English: The heirloom baskets (of knowledge)
- Founders: Tā Āpirana Ngata (legislator); Hōne Taiapa (carver); Emily Schuster (weaver)
- Established: 1926, reestablished 1963
- Focus: Revival and perpetuation of traditional Māori arts
- Formerly called: Rotorua Māori Arts and Crafts Institute
- Address: Hemo Rd, Tihiotonga 3010
- Location: Whakarewarewa, Rotorua, Aotearoa New Zealand

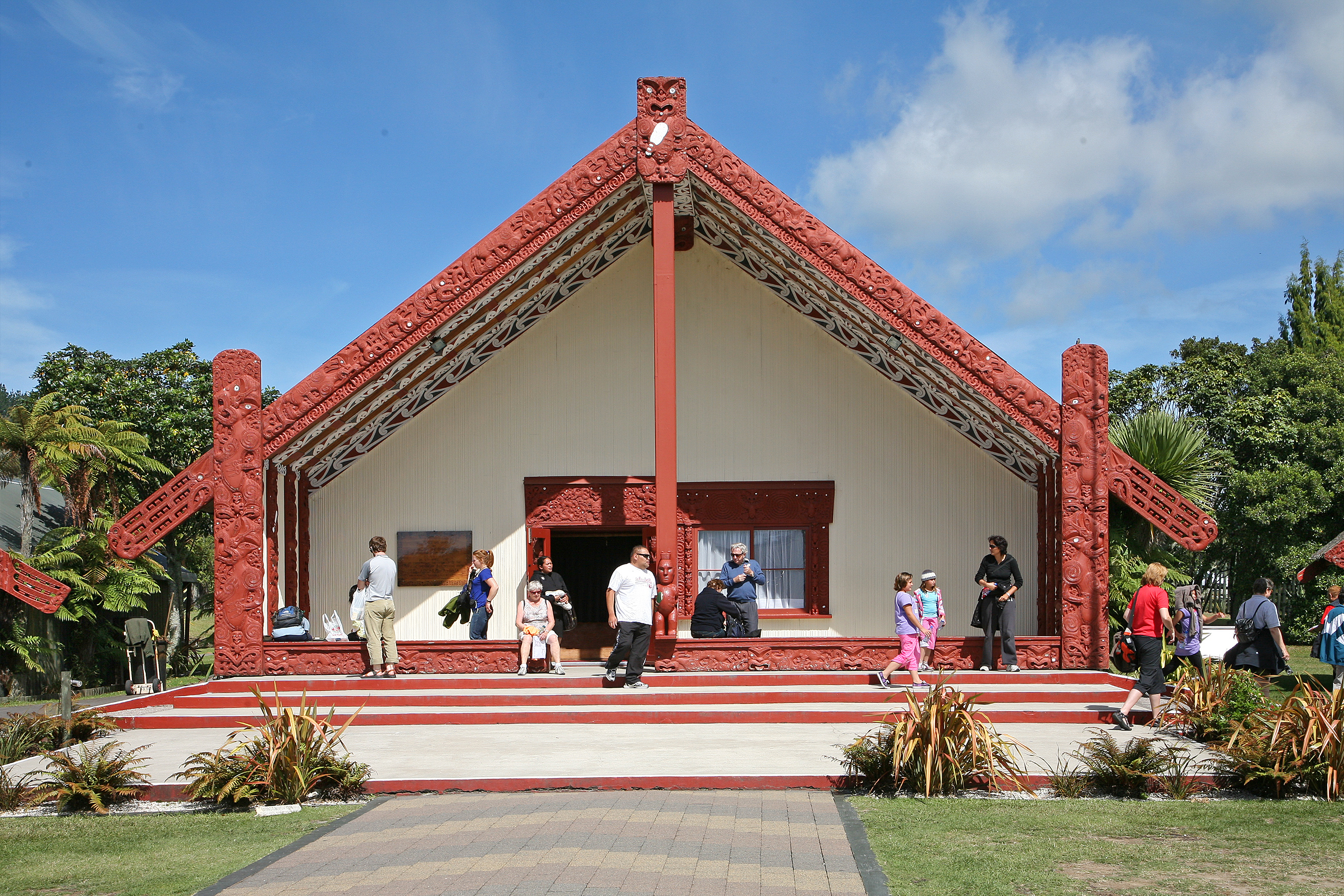
Rotowhio Marae, located at Te Puia/NZMACI and named for ancient Pā in the same site

The New Zealand Māori Arts and Crafts Institute (NZMACI) is an indigenous traditional art school located in Rotorua, New Zealand. It operates the national schools of three major Māori art forms.

NZMACI opened in 1963 as a successor school to the previous national school for woodcarving (wānanga whakairo) in Rotorua, New Zealand. The original Institute had been established in 1926 by Sir Āpirana Ngata to combat the impending threat of the loss of traditional Māori arts. The new school continued the tradition in a location well-established for traditional Māori arts and crafts. The location of the schools at Whakarewarewa enabled access to the Rotorua tourist market, which has allowed the Institute to operate with financial independence for the majority of its history. The school is associated with tours which have been guided through the Whakarewarewa Valley since the mid-19th century, now under the umbrella of Te Puia.

== History ==
The New Zealand School of Māori Arts and Crafts (Te Ao Marama) was founded in 1926 by Āpirana Ngata, then the Member of Parliament for Eastern Maori which included Rotorua. The school focused on teaching traditional Māori arts and crafts. Ngata believed that arts was vital to the rejuvenation of Māori culture. He imbedded into the training an orthodoxy that privileged certain patterns and excluded others. The school was located near the geyser field at Whakarewarewa outside of Rotorua. The original school closed as a result of the second world war.

The Rotorua Maori Arts and Crafts Institute Act 1963 founded the school as a legal entity, and the act was amended by the New Zealand Maori Arts and Crafts Institute Amendment Act 1967 which changed it from a local to a national institute, by removing most references to Rotorua. Since the spelling of Maori has changed to Māori as part of an effort to make the Māori language phonetic.

Since the Māori Renaissance of the 1980s and 1990s, Māori traditions have had more impact on contemporary art in New Zealand, leading to a blurring of the lines between art, fine arts and Māori art. The Institute exhibits at events such as Māori Art Market but its teaching and output continue to focus on more traditional items.

The Institute can be visited through Te Puia, a significant tourist attraction in Rotorua, Aotearoa.

== The Institute ==
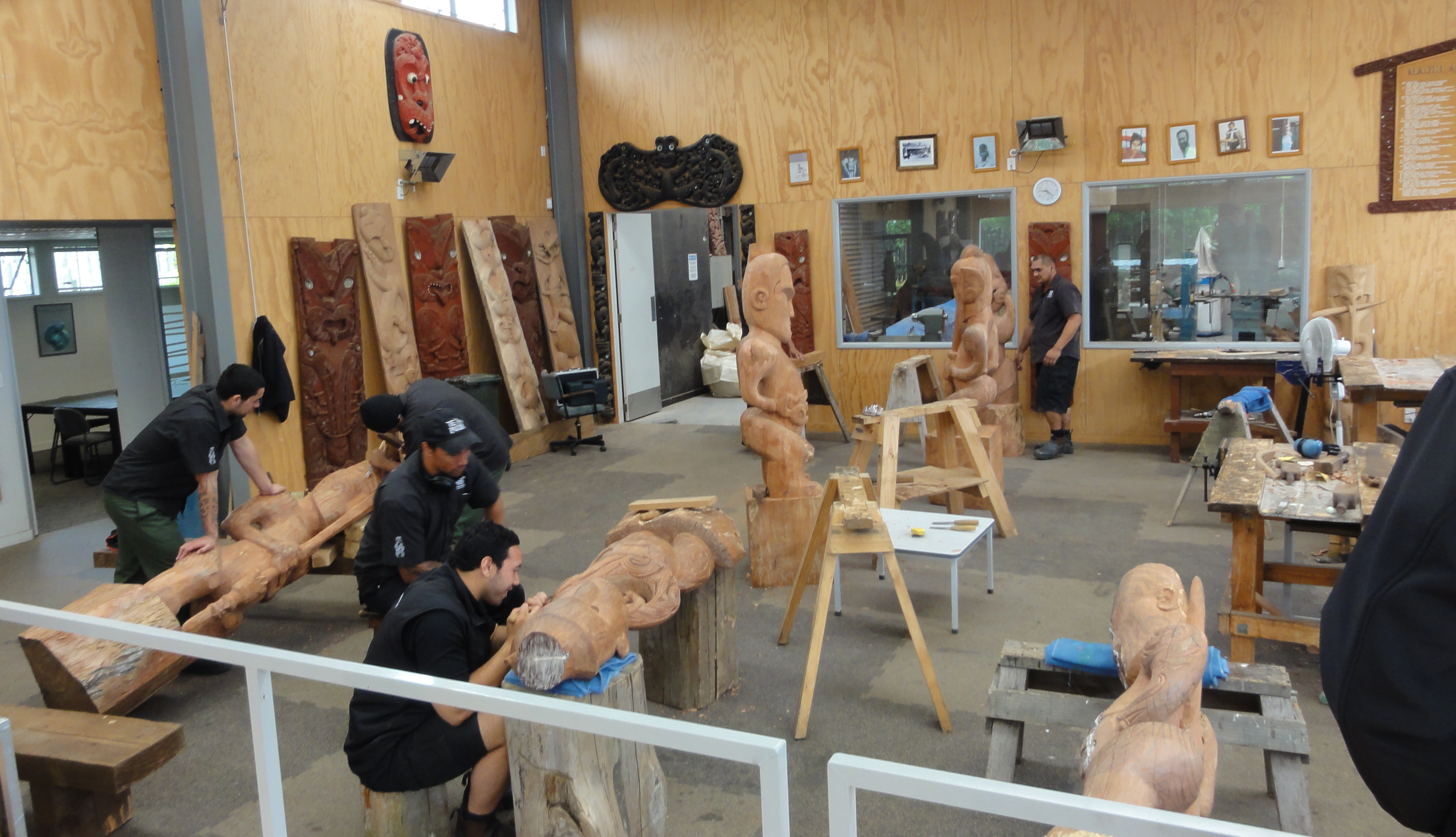
The carving school

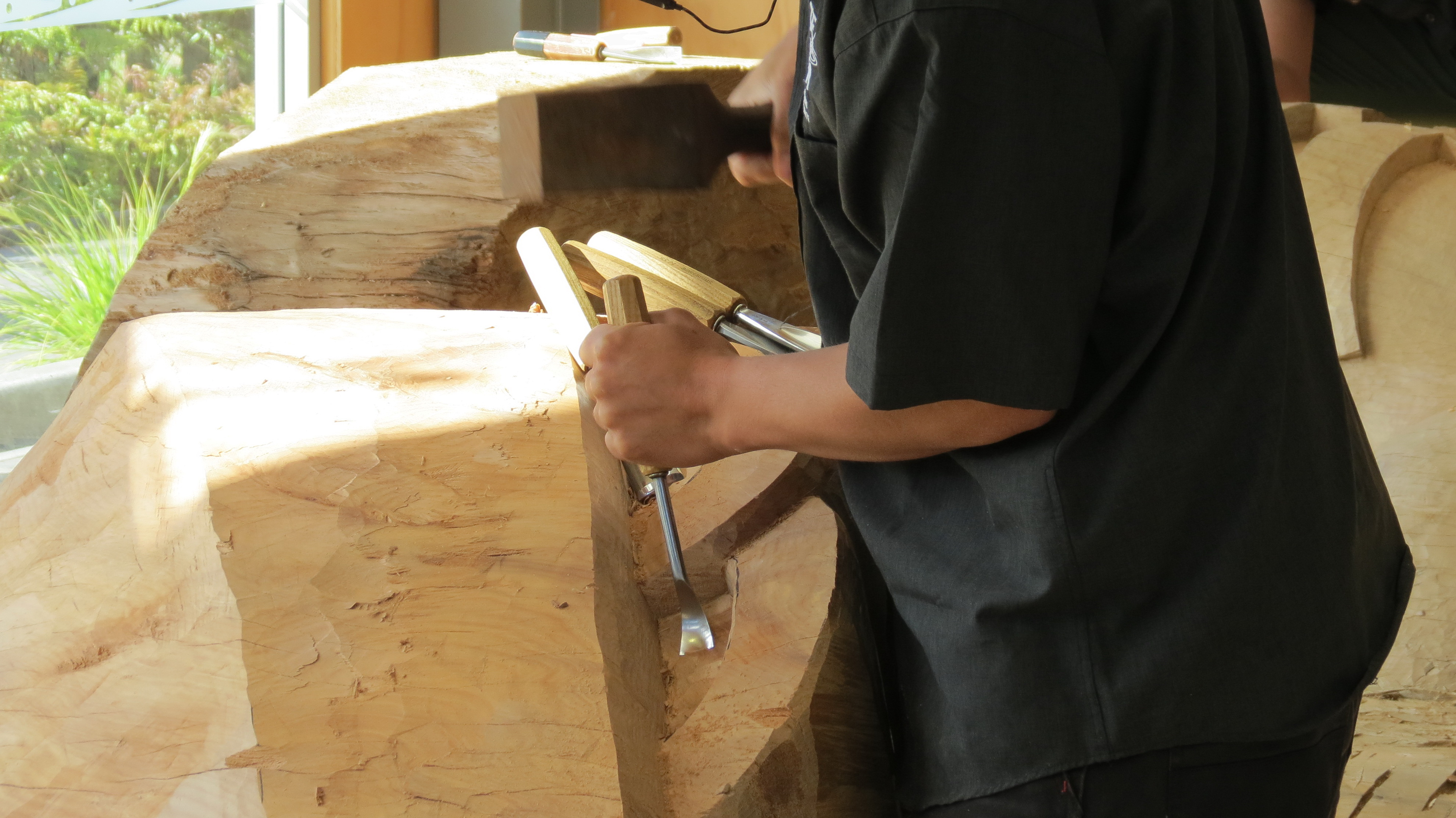
Carving in process

=== Wood Carving ===
A predominant artform of the Māori people is whakairo, carving, referred to by some as the written language of the Māori.

The national wood carving school, Te Wānanga Whakairo Rākau o Aotearoa, was opened in 1967 and has since restored and built over 40 whare whakairo around New Zealand. The first Tumu (head) of the carving school was the late renowned Tohunga Whakairo (Master Carver), Hone Taiapa.

=== Jade, Bone & Stone Carving ===
Long a part of the Te Wānanga Whakairo Rākau (carving school), the traditional adornment and toolmaking arts were moved to a dedicated school headed by artist Lewis Tamihana Gardiner and initially specialised in pounamu. The new national school for Jade, Bone & Stone Carving was named as Te Takapū o Rotowhio by local rangatira and kura whakairo graduate, Mauriora Kingi.

The school is now headed by Stacy Gordine, a master carver or tōhunga whakairo of Ngāti Porou descent.

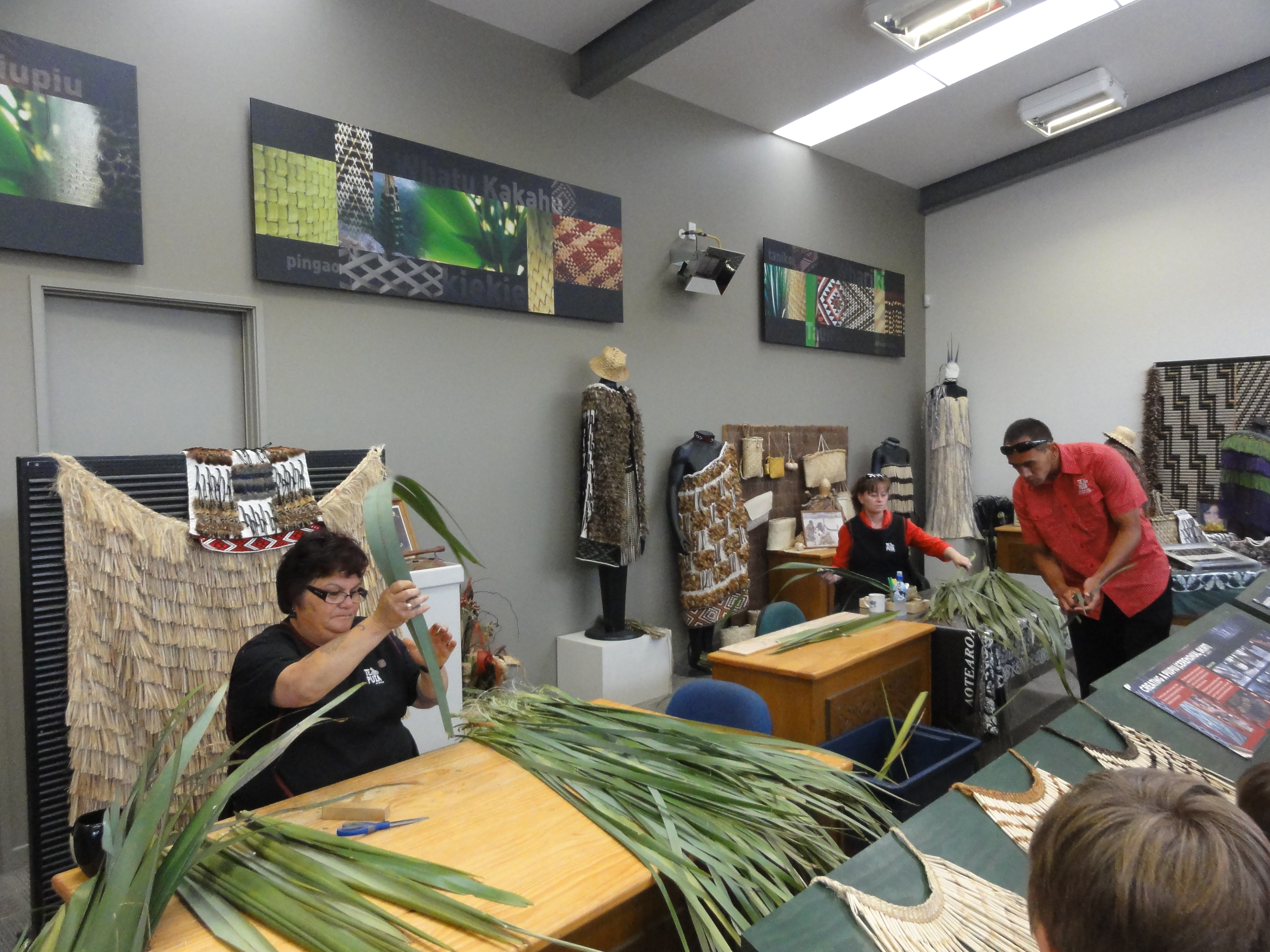
Weaving school Māori Arts and Craft Institute

=== Weaving ===
Traditional Māori textiles and weaving was an artform taught at the Institute, often referred to in the Māori language as raranga.

The weaving school named Te Whare Raranga was established in 1967 by the head of the school (Te Tumu Raranga) Emily Schuster. It was renamed Te Rito in 1988. Schuster stayed as the head until the mid 1990s and stayed on in a Cultural Advisor until her death in 1997.

Schuster was succeeded by her daughters Dawn Smith and Edna Pahewa. Pahewa held the role for 18 years. The third and Tumu was master weaver Meleta Bennett who was mentored by Pahewa. The current Tumu is Cor Marsters who also graduated from Whakairo Rākau in 2012.

The founding of the schools was part of the reassurance of whakairo and raranga and many of the alumni of the schools went on to play roles in the Māori renaissance.

== Major works ==
=== Marae restoration and building ===
Over 40 marae have been built or restored under the auspices of NZMACI, and countless more by graduates. The first cohort began with artwork for local businesses before moving on to restoration and replacement of carvings on Māori churches and meeting houses.

=== Matatini Stage ===
The Institute was responsible for carving the Māhau stage used for the world’s largest Māori cultural festival, Te Matatini. Made from over 26 tonnes of native wood, 5 tonnes of steel and 36 tonnes of concrete it is the largest Māori carved structure in existence at 30m across and over 13m high. More than 20 of the staff and students at NZMACI worked a total of over 15,000 hours to complete. The symbols used are relevant to the history of performing arts in Aotearoa. Te Māhau was debuted in 2012.

=== Pou Maumahara ===
An international commemoration of war dead located at Passchendaele Memorial Park in Zonnebeke, Belgium, the Pou Maumahara is an 8-metre, 17 tonne woodcarving which was carved from a kauri log at NZMACI. The project was driven by Belgian architect Freddy DeClerck. The Pou Maumahara was designed by Tumu Whakarae Clive Fugill and carved under the leadership of Tumu Whakairo James Rickard by the staff and students of Te Wānanga Whakairo o Aotearoa. The process took more than four years and the pou was unveiled on ANZAC day 2019.

=== Te Ahi Tupua ===
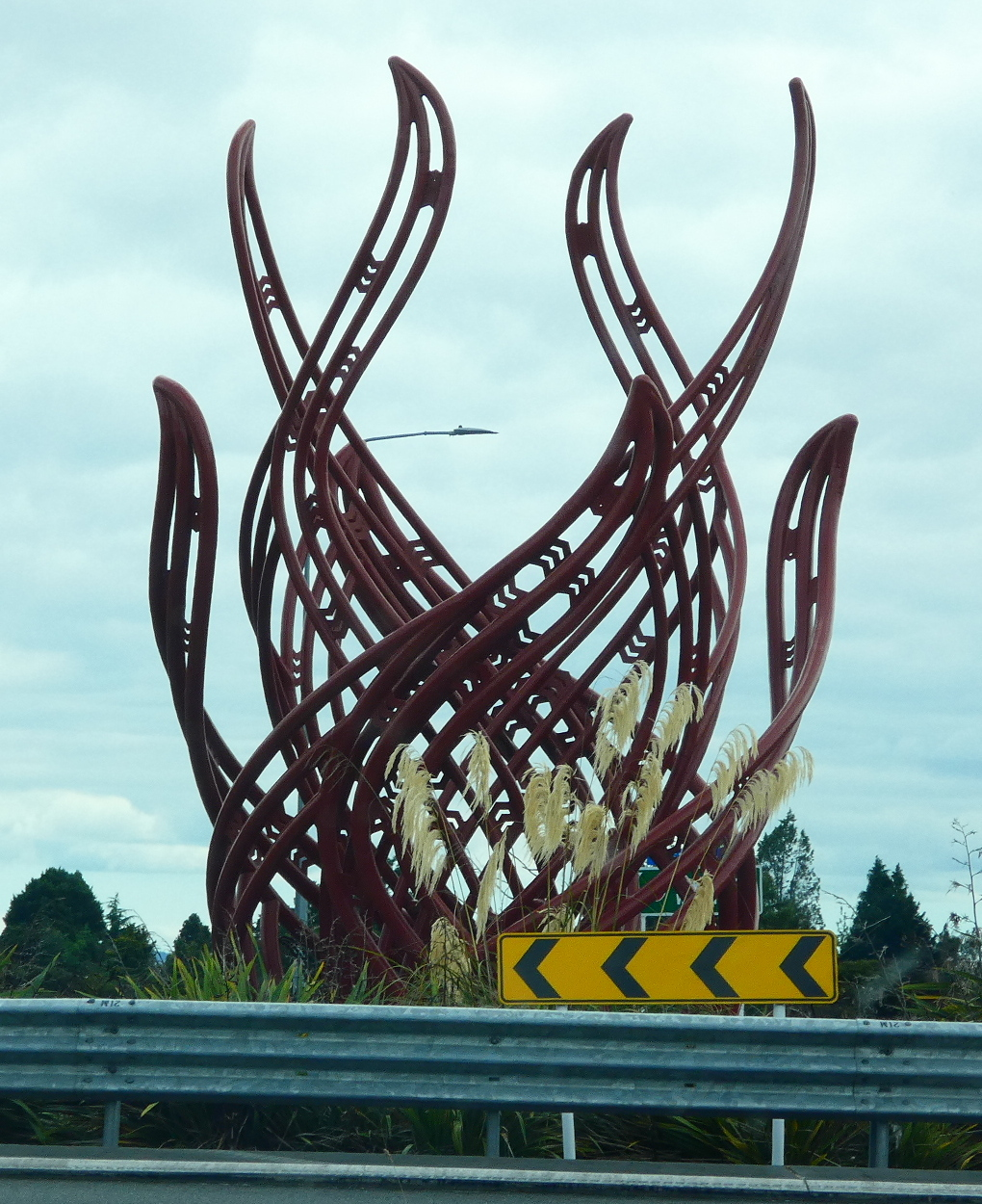
Te Ahi Tupua

Te Ahi Tupua was constructed from a design created by Tōhunga Whakairo and Tumu, Te Takapū o Rotowhio, Stacy Gordine and digitised by academics from Victoria University of Wellington. The massive sculpture uses traditional Māori visual language to tell the story of Ngātoro-i-rangi, in relation to the landmarks of the area. Ngātoro-i-rangi, a founding ancestor of the region, is the navigator said to have guided (under duress) the voyaging canoe Te Arawa to Aotearoa. He is traditionally associated with the geothermal activity in the area.

Te Ahi Tupua stands at 12m high and is the tallest sculpture of its kind and a world first in its 3D printed composite construction.

Te Ahi Tupua was commissioned as a small part of a $7.6 million restructuring of the Hemo Gorge roundabout near the location of the Institute. The project was jointly funded by NZTA under their policy of creating art alongside new road works with further support by the Rotorua District Council.

Te Ahi Tupua, along with Pōhutu Geyser and the district’s lakes now forms the basis for the emblem of the city and district of Rotorua.

== Artists ==
Reanga or intakes are cohorts of 1-4 students selected from a pool of applicants to learn Māori Arts and Crafts on a modest scholarship traditionally funded by tourism. Because the aim of the Institute is revival of the culture within communities, applicants are expected to be Māori practitioners of traditional arts, with the strongest applications coming with iwi-tono or tribal support. Graduates are expected to serve their tribes and communities.

=== Alumni ===
List of graduates: Graduate name (School, Nth intake)

- Pine Taiapa (1926 institute) Ngāti Porou
- Hōne Te Kāuru Taiapa (1926 institute) Ngāti Porou, younger brother of Pine, first master carver of the 1967 revived school.
- Piri Poutapu (1926 institute, 1929 intake) Tainui, descended in direct line from the carvers of the Tainui voyaging canoe. Entered with iwi tono by Princess Te Puea. Went on to become waka carver and royal Kingitanga carver,
- Clive Fugill (Wānanga Whakairo Rākau, 1st intake) Ngāti Ranginui
- James Rickard (Wānanga Whakairo Rākau, 1st intake) Tainui, Tohunga Whakairo, former Tumu Whakairo
- Dr Lyonel Grant (Wānanga Whakairo Rākau, 6th intake) Te Arawa
- Riki Manuel (Wānanga Whakairo Rākau, 8th intake)
- Albert Te Pou (Wānanga Whakairo Rākau, 8th intake) Tūhoe current Tumu, Te Wānanga Whakairo o Aotearoa
- Mauri Ora Kingi (Wānanga Whakairo Rākau, 8th intake) Te Arawa, Tūhourangi, Ngāti Raukawa
- Fayne Robinson (Wānanga Whakairo Rākau, 13th intake) Kāi Tahu, prominent South Island artist.
- Roi Toia (Wānanga Whakairo Rākau, 14th intake)
- Gordon Toi (Wānanga Whakairo Rākau, Nth intake) Ngāpuhi, prominent tohunga tā moko artist of the Māori tattoo revival.
- Arekatera Katz Maihi (Wānanga Whakairo Rākau, 21st intake) Ngāti Whātua, also musician and tā moko artist.
- Colin Tihi (Wānanga Whakairo Rākau, 19th intake; Takapū 6th intake) Ngāti Tarawhai, a carver and painter notably the only graduate of both carving wānanga.

=== Tumu ===
Each of the schools is headed by an expert in their traditional artform, titled Tumu. Cohorts of 1-4 students are selected from a pool of applicants to learn from the Tumu and their Pouako (tutors).

List of Tumu: (year-year) Tumu name

==== Tumu, Te Wānanga Whakairo o Aotearoa (incomplete) ====
- (1967 - 1979) Hone Taiapa
- (1983 - 1995) Clive Fugill, Ngāti Ranginui, (titular Tumu Whakarae 1995 - present)
- (2019 - 2023) Albert Te Pou, Ngāi Tūhoe
- (2023 - present) Grant Marunui

==== Tumu, Te Takapū o Rotowhio ====
- (2009 - 2013) Lewis Tamihana Gardiner, Ngāti Pikiao, Kāi Tahu
- (2013 - present) Stacy Gordine Ngāti Porou

==== Tumu, Te Rito o Rotowhio ====
- (1969 - 1997) Emily Schuster
- (1997 -2019) Edna Pahewa
- (2020 - 2024) Meleta Bennett
- (2025 - present) Cori Marsters, Te Arawa, Te Whakatōhea.

== Governance ==
Historically the minister responsible for tourism or an Associate Minister of Tourism made appointments to the NZMACI governing board. Board members have included Robert McFarlane, Ani Waaka, David Thomas, Sir Howard Morrison, Dr Erihapeti Rehu-Murchie, June Grant, Judith Stanway, Ray Watson, Erenora Puketapu-Hetet, Mike Simm, David Tapsell Ken Raureti, Robyn Bargh and Tupara Morrison.

Governance has been altered as a result of the Tiriti o Waitangi settlement negotiations between the NZ government and local iwi. As part of the NZMACI Vesting Act (2020), the local iwi: Tuhourangi, Ngāti Wāhiao and Ngāti Whakaue will be recognised as traditional and as legal owners of Te Puia and associated assets and will have official representation on the board.

== See also ==
- Pounamu
- Whakairo
- Māori traditional textiles
- Tāniko
