= Te Roopu Raranga Whatu o Aotearoa =

New Zealand national Māori weavers' collective

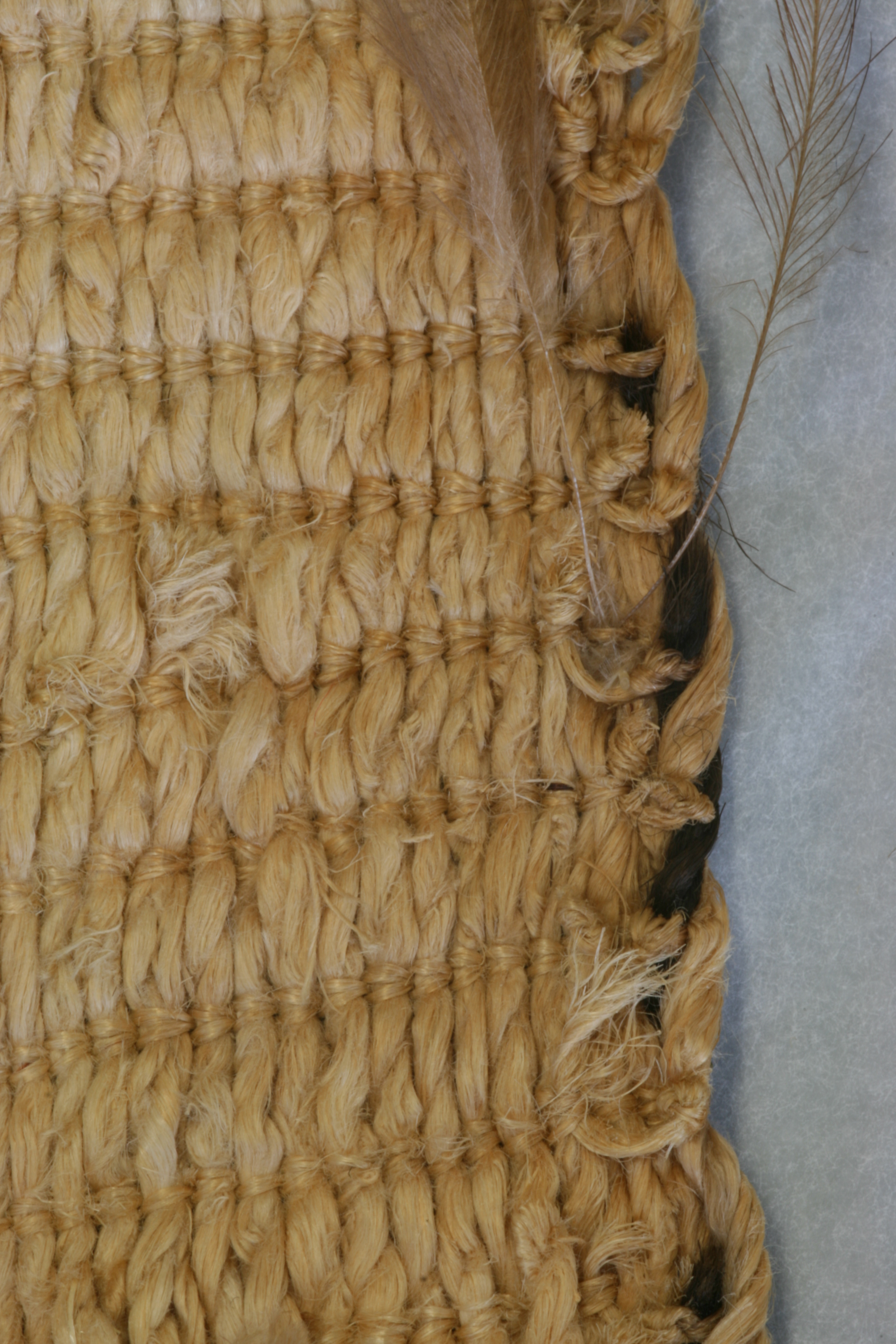
Detail of border of kahu kiwi

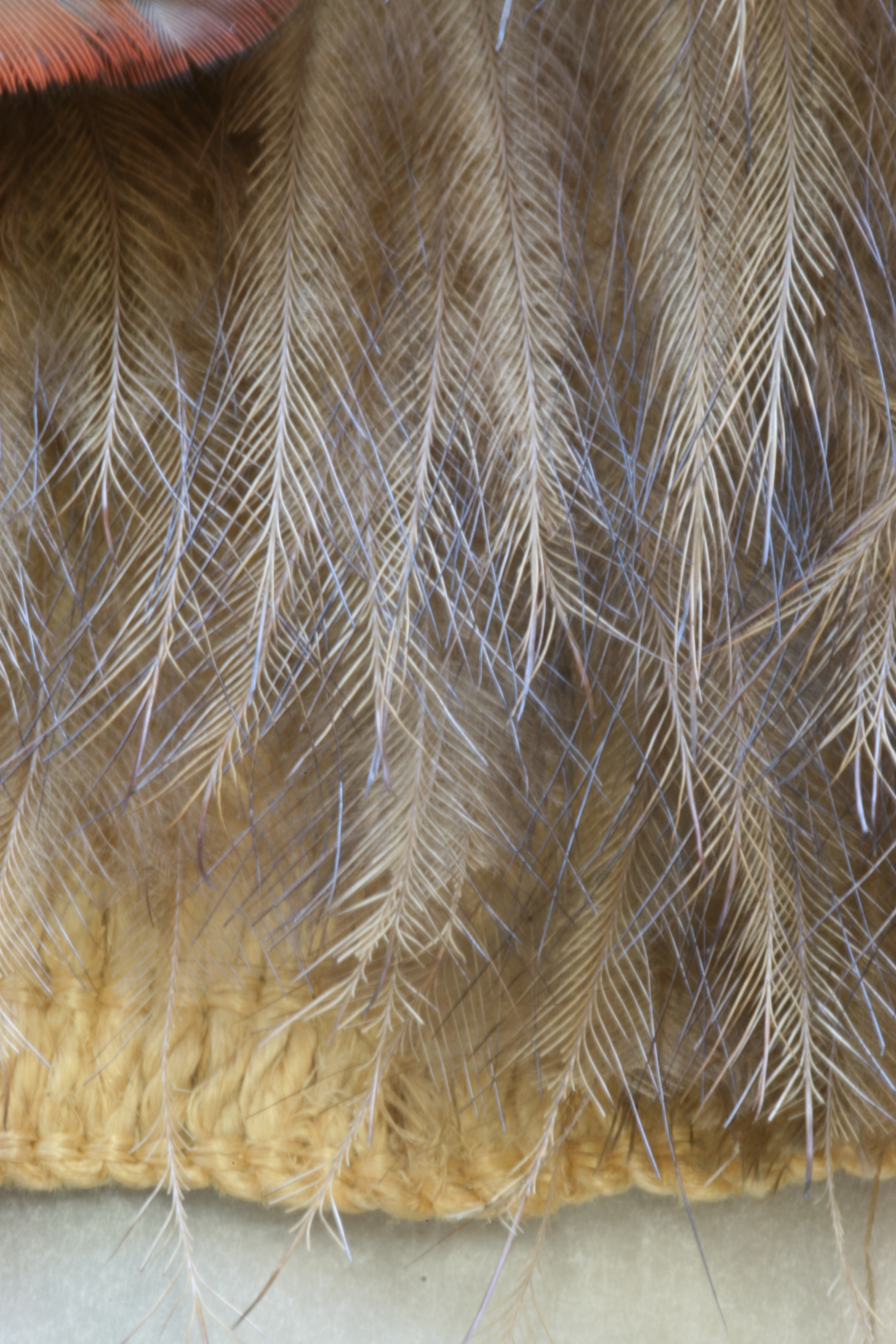
Detail of bottom border of kahu kiwi, showing the distinctive hair-like structure of kiwi feathers.

Te Roopu Raranga Whatu o Aotearoa or Māori Weavers New Zealand is the New Zealand national Māori weavers' collective, which aims to foster and preserve Māori traditional textiles. It has played an important role in facilitating the gathering of weavers of Māori and Pasifika descent to meet, teach and learn from one another.

The collective was established when the wider collective of Aotearoa Moananui a Kiwa Weavers, founded by the Māori and South Pacific Arts Council in 1983, was split into the Māori and Pasifika portions of the organisation. This split came about as a result of funding reasons — current Toi Māori Aotearoa funding is specifically targeted at Māori arts. This split of groups occurred in 1994.

Te Roopu holds national hui (attendance of which is required by a number of tertiary courses), regional workshops, publishes a newsletter, coordinates with research funding agencies and publishes books.

Emily Schuster of Māori Arts and Crafts Institute in Rotorua was the first chairperson. Diggeress Te Kanawa was a co-founder. Cath Brown was also a founding member and went on to coordinate the production of the organisation's newsletter. Christina Wirihana is the current chairperson and Te Hemo Ata Henare is the deputy chair.

There is some overlap of personnel and events with Māori Women's Welfare League, but the League has a much broader remit, longer history and more political outlook.

== National hui ==
The national hui is held biennially at Labour Weekend at different Marae around the country.

- 1983 Pakirikiri Marae, Tokomaru Bay
- 1985 Kokohinau Marae, Te Teko
- 1987 Tunohopu, Rotorua
- 1988 Omaka Marae, Blenheim
- 1990 Apumoana Marae, Rotorua
- 1992 Taurua Marae, Rotoiti, Rotorua
- 1993 Parihaka Marae, Taranaki
- 1995 Te Reo Nihi marae, Te Hāpua
- 1997 Takahanga Marae, Kaikohe
- 1999 Pakirikiri Marae, Tokomaru Bay
- 2001 Kokohinau Marae, Te Teko
- 2003 Awhitu Marae, Palmerston North
- 2005 Owae Marae, Waitara
- 2007 Maraenui Marae, Te Kaha
- 2009 Takitimu Marae, Wairoa
- 2011 Maketu Marae, Kawhia
- 2013 Rautahi Marae, Kawerau
- 2015 Roma Marae, Ahipara
- 2017 Te Wai-iti Marae, Rotoiti, Rotorua
- 2019 Ngā Hau e Whā Marae, Christchurch
