= Lyonel Grant =

New Zealand master carver and sculptor (1957- )

- Born: 1957 (age 68–69); Rotorua, New Zealand
- Education: New Zealand Māori Arts and Crafts Institute, Rotorua
- Known for: Carving, sculpture
- Awards: Arts Foundation of New Zealand, Laureate Award 2009.

Lyonel Grant (born 1957) is a New Zealand Māori master carver and sculptor.

== Carving ==
During the 1970s, Grant learnt under master carver Hōne Taiapa at the New Zealand Māori Arts and Crafts Institute in Rotorua. In 2009 Grant received an honorary Doctorate of Philosophy (Education) from Unitec Institute of Technology. The same year he also received an Arts Foundation of New Zealand Laureate Award.

Between 1985 and 1987 Grant completed his first whare whakairo (carved house, meeting house), Te Matapihi o te Rangi at Te Papa o te Aroha Marae in Tokoroa. His second whare whakairo was Ihenga at Tangatarua Marae, on the Waiariki Institute of Technology campus in Rotorua. Ihenga was completed between 1993 and 1996. In 2007 Grant co-authored Ihenga: Te Haerenga Hou, The Evolution of Māori Carving in the 20th Century with Damian Skinner. In 2009 Grant completed Ngākau Māhaki at Te Noho Kotahitanga Marae on the Unitec Institute of Technology Mt Albert campus.

== Personal life ==
Born in Rotorua, Grant affiliates to Ngāti Pikiao and Te Arawa. Grant identifies as Māori Indian.

== Exhibitions and collections ==
Grant has exhibited both internationally and nationally. His work is held in the collections of The British Museum and The Museum of New Zealand Te Papa Tongarewa.

== Gallery ==
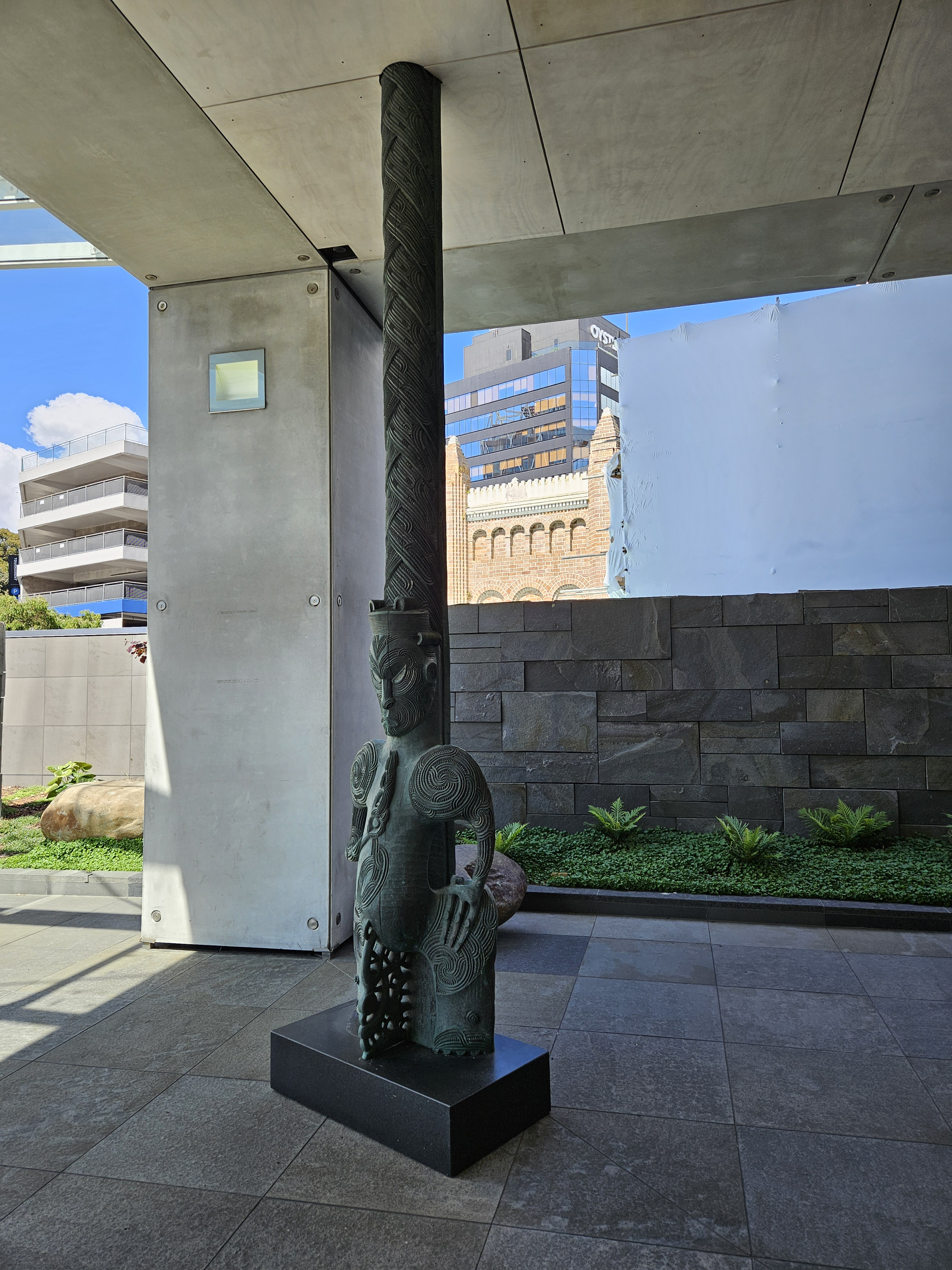
Pou Tokomanawa (1999) at the Lumley Centre in Auckland

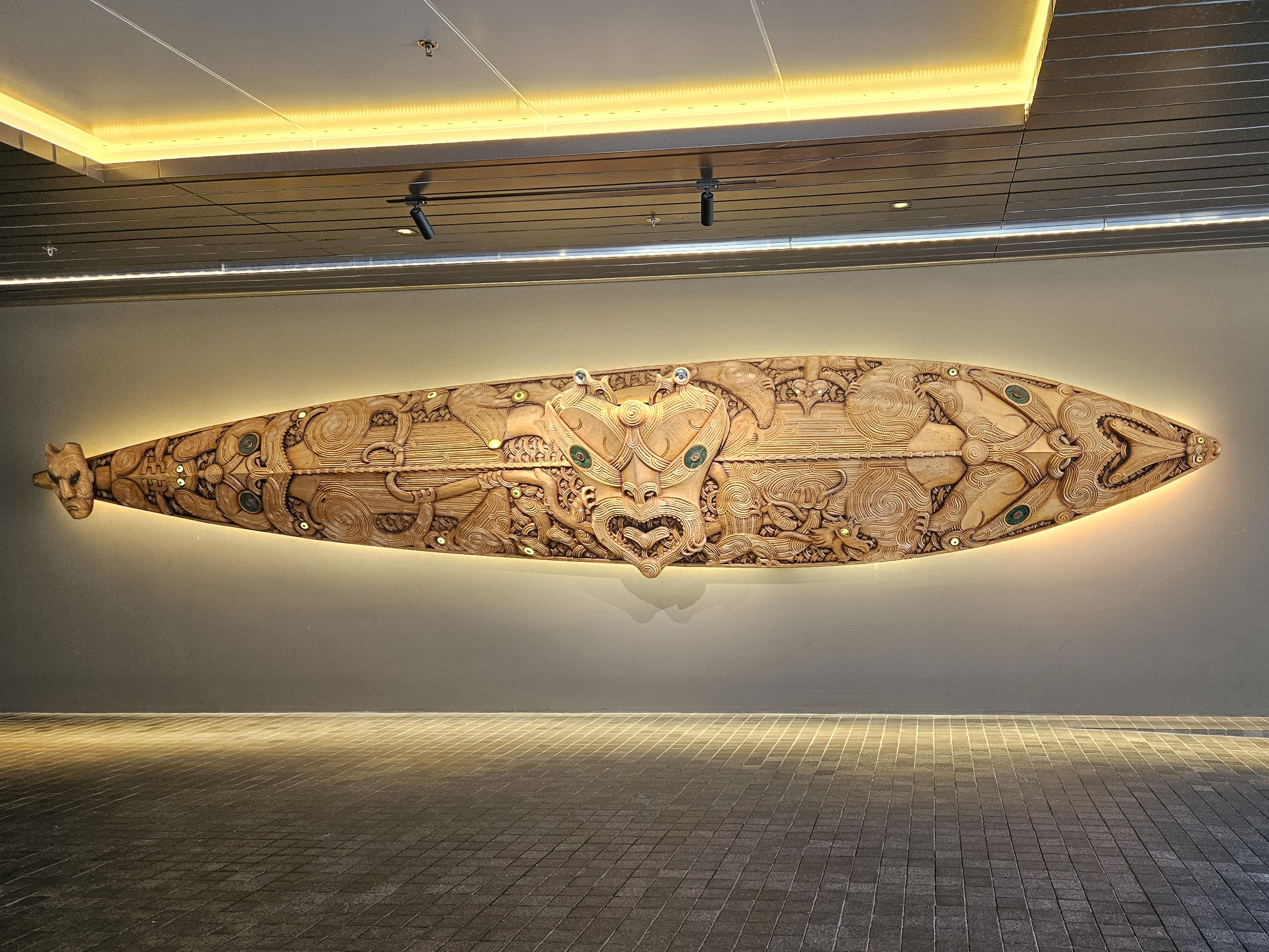
Tāmaki Herenga Waka (2020) at the Park Hyatt Auckland
