= Thomas Aubrey Chappé Hall =

New Zealand wood carver, farmer (1873–1958)

Thomas Aubrey Chappé Hall (16 June 1873 – 21 May 1958) was a New Zealand wood carver and farmer.

== Early life ==
He was born in Ruddington, Nottinghamshire, England on 16 June 1873. His parents were John Hall and Margaret Louise Chappé de Leonval. He attended Leamington and Tonbridge.

== New Zealand ==
Hall left London in 1895, moving to the Whanganui River area, where he studied whakairo (Māori traditional carving) under Hōri Pukehika, celebrated Te Āti Haunui-a-Pāpārangi carver.

He served in the Second Boer War before returning to New Zealand, marrying Ethel Marguerite Adams in 1904.
