= Roopu =

Roopū or rōpū is a Māori word for an organisation, group, or collective. The term is widely used in New Zealand as part of the name of organisations, especially those which have a strong connection with the New Zealand Māori population. In organisational names, it usually follows the word Te ("The"). Traditionally, the word is spelt roopu, but modern linguistics favours the use of a macron over a single vowel to indicate a longer sound, rather than a double letter.

Notable organisations within New Zealand that use Roopu or Rōpū as part of their names include:

- Te Roopu Huihuinga Hauora (a major Māori healthcare organisation)
- New Zealand Association of Counsellors / Te Roopu Kaiwhiriwhiri o Aotearoa
- Te Roopū Māori (the Māori students' association of the University of Otago)
- Te Roopu Pounamu (the Māori network of the Green Party of Aotearoa New Zealand)
- Te Roopu Raranga Whatu o Aotearoa (the national Māori weavers' collective)
- Te Roopu Rawakore (the National Unemployed and Beneficiaries Movement)
- New Zealand Law Students' Association Te Roopu Tauira Ture o Aotearoa
- Te Rōpū o te Ora / Women's Health League
- Te Ropu Wahine Maori Toko i te Ora (Māori Women's Welfare League)
- The Waitangi Tribunal/Te Rōpū Whakamana i te Tiriti
