= Emily Schuster =

New Zealand weaver

Emily Rangitiaria Schuster OBE QSM (née Hicks, 12 January 1927 – 5 September 1997) was a New Zealand master weaver of Te Arawa descent.

== Early life and family ==
Born in 1927 in Rotorua, Schuster was the niece of Rangitiaria Dennan, better known as Guide Rangi. She married Bob Schuster in 1950, and the couple had six children. Her twin daughters Dawn Smith and Edna Pahewa became weaving tutors and experts. She lived all her life in Rotorua.

== Contribution to weaving ==
Schuster was the convenor of the Aotearoa Moananui a Kiwa Weavers Committee since its inception in 1983, and was the weaving representative on Te Waka Toi's Māori Art Committee.

Schuster founded the weaving school at the New Zealand Māori Arts and Crafts Institute in Rotorua, in 1969. Her daughter, Edna Pahewa, is the school's current head. In 1988, Schuster and Diggeress Te Kanawa were awarded a travel grant to visit taonga kept in museums in the United Kingdom and United States. Schuster represented Aotearoa at a conservation conference in Brazil. Schuster continued to travel and teach until her death in 1997.

Daena Walker writes that Schuster has been "acknowledged internationally as one of the most gifted weavers of her generation. Her contribution to the art of Māori weaving and her knowledge of kaitiakitanga, particularly the cultivation and conservation of harakeke (flax) and its origins, has ensured the survival of this craft today."

== Honours and awards ==
In the 1983 Queen's Birthday Honours, Schuster was awarded the Queen's Service Medal for community service. In 1993, she was awarded the New Zealand Suffrage Centennial Medal. She was appointed an Officer of the Order of the British Empire, for services to Māori arts and crafts, in the 1994 Queen's Birthday Honours.
