= Te Ahi Tupua =

Sculpture in Rotorua, New Zealand

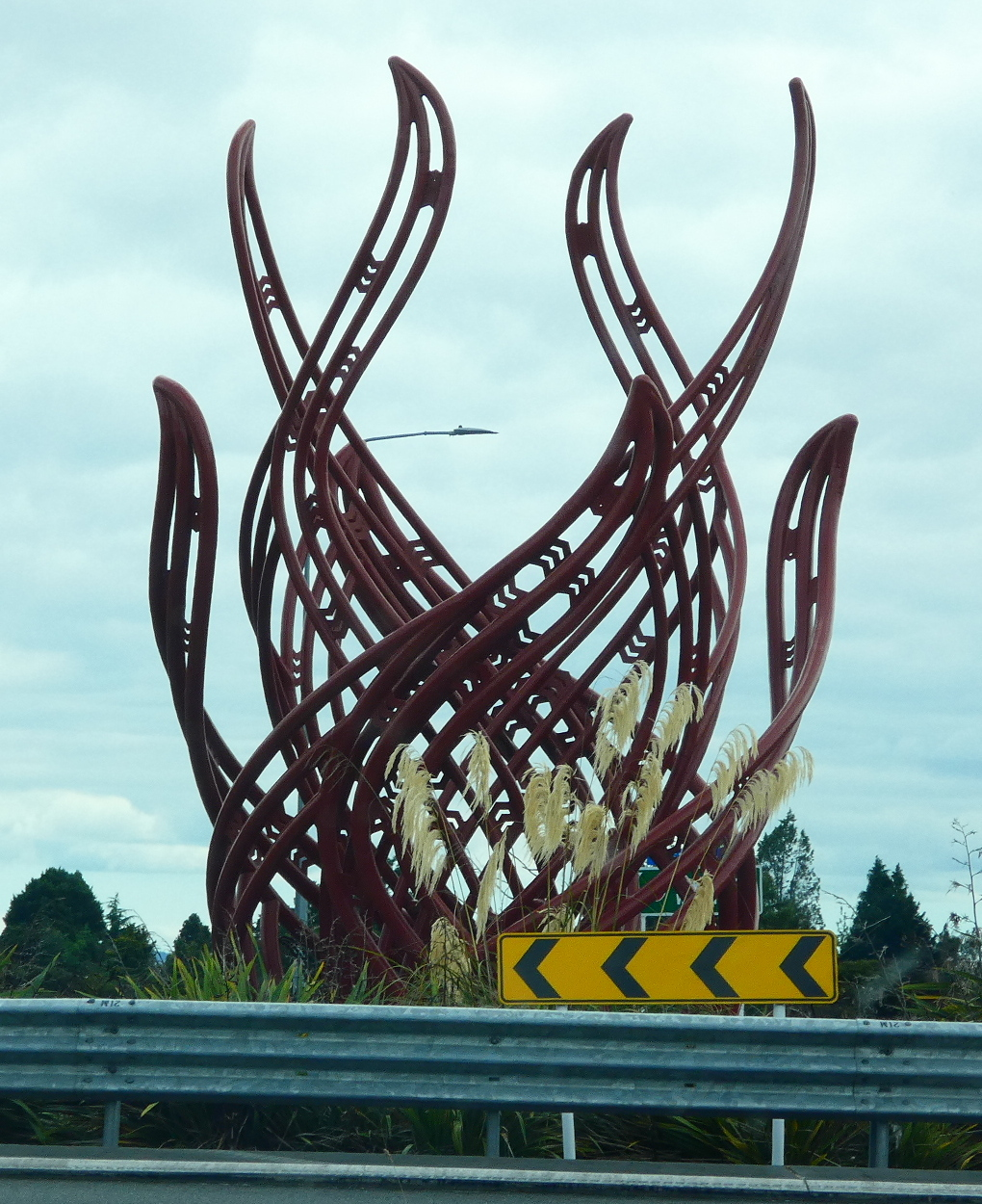
- Te Ahi Tupua in 2026
- Completion date: 2020
- Dimensions: 12 m (470 in)
- Location: 38.165°S 176.2466°E

Te Ahi Tupua is a 12-metre-tall (39 ft) sculpture in a roundabout in Rotorua, New Zealand. Designed by the New Zealand Māori Arts and Crafts Institute, the sculpture was inspired by the nearby Pōhutu Geyser and, according to the Rotorua Lakes Council, "weaves the stories of Ngātoroirangi, connections to other tribal groups and manaakitanga (hospitality)". The name Te Ahi Tupua translates as "The Eternal Fire".

Work on the sculpture began in 2015; it was initially scheduled to be installed at the roundabout in 2017, but was installed in 2020 due to delays. The costs involved in creating Te Ahi Tupua were criticised by taxpayer groups.

== Description ==
Te Ahi Tupua was designed by the New Zealand Māori Arts and Crafts Institute and was 3D printed by Kilwell Sports Ltd. Inspiration for the sculpture came from the Pōhutu Geyser. According to the Rotorua Lakes Council, the sculpture "weaves the stories of Ngātoroirangi, connections to other tribal groups and manaakitanga (hospitality)". Its manufacturer, Kilwell Fibretube, believes that Te Ahi Tupua is the world's largest 3D printed sculpture, at 12 metres (39 ft) tall.

== History ==
The idea for the sculpture came about in 2015. The original plan was to use steel for the sculpture, but due to concerns about a high weight, the material was changed and it was decided that the sculpture would be 3D printed. With the stainless steel it would have weighed approximately 12 tonnes (26,000 lb), but in 2017, before the printing began, it was expected that the 3D printed sculpture would end up weighing 800 kilograms (1,800 lb). In 2018, Te Ahi Tupua was estimated to weigh 3,450 kilograms (7,610 lb).

In September 2017, the installation of the sculpture was delayed by about a year because a sub-contractor in Canada had previous commitments. It was suggested at the time that the sculpture be slightly redesigned, which could have allowed for the discovery of other companies capable of making the sculpture.

The 3D printing took about 16,500 hours. Before the printing began, it was expected that it would be printed over a period of 79 days, in sessions of 21 hours at a time. They expected to use 63 kilometres (39 mi) worth of PLA (plastic) filament. Carbon fibre was placed over the plastic.

Te Ahi Tupua was installed in September 2020, three years later than the initially scheduled installation date of July 2017. The sculpture was transported to the Hemo Gorge roundabout by helicopter and then put into place by crane. The inner helix was not initially placed according to plan, and required some temporary minor modifications before the outer helix was installed.

In December 2020, the New Zealand Taxpayers' Union and Rotorua District Residents and Ratepayers' groups placed a sign near the sculpture on State Highway 5 which read "Monumental waste ahead. Cost $743,000 and counting". Another sign called the sculpture "Rotorua's Biggest Waste of Money". The signs were removed.

In early 2022, scaffolding was placed around Te Ahi Tupua and work began on repainting the sculpture because some of the paint was peeling. At the time it was expected to take two months. Around that time the sculpture also experienced damage from people climbing on it and from vandalism. The sculpture had to be repaired in March 2023 after damage believed to be caused by someone climbing on it. From the sculpture's installation to March 2023, the total repair costs were $7,127, not including the repairs in March.

== Costs ==
The original expectation was that the sculpture would cost $500,000, but it ended up costing $743,029. In February 2021, an official information request by Local Democracy Reporting revealed that maintenance of the sculpture would involve washing that would cost about $1,000 per year and a repaint once every seven years that would cost about $30,000. These maintenance costs would average out to about $5,200 per year.

In December 2016, the sculpture was estimated to cost $500,000. At the time it was planned that funding of $200,000 would come from the New Zealand Transport Agency, $150,000 from the Rotorua Lakes District Council's art budget and $50,000 from Te Puia. The council voted in December 2016 that if they could not find funders for the additional $100,000, they would fund it themselves.

There were also $9,328.05 worth of "installation traffic management costs".

== Cultural context and reception ==
The sculpture reflects Māori cosmology and storytelling traditions, particularly those associated with geothermal activity in the Rotorua region.

The costs involved in creating Te Ahi Tupua were a subject of controversy. Jordan Williams, the executive director of the New Zealand Taxpayers' Union, said in 2019 that "Petrol taxes are supposed to go to building safer roads, not artists and sculptors" and "With so many dying on our roads due to underinvestment, a $200,000 roundabout sculpture is a questionable use of money."
