= Te Hemo Ata Henare =

New Zealand Māori weaver

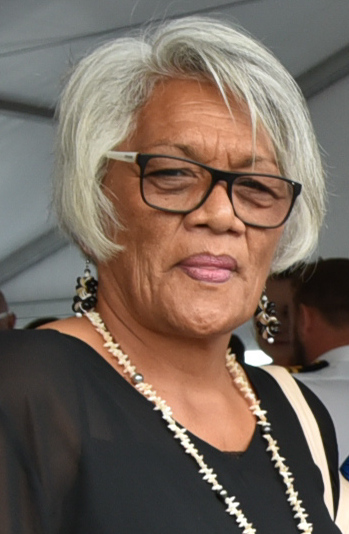
- Born: New Zealand
- Education: Massey University
- Known for: Weaving

Te Hemo Ata Henare is a New Zealand Māori tohunga raranga (master weaver).

== Biography ==
Henare's tribal affiliations are with Ngāti Kahu, Ngāti Hine and Te Whakatōhea. She learnt to weave when she was 12 years old. As an adult she became a teacher of weaving, and teaches at NorthTec polytechnic college in Northland. She holds a bachelor's degree and a master's degree in Māori visual arts from Massey University.

Henare is deputy chair of Te Roopu Raranga Whatu o Aotearoa.

She was married to Erima Henare (died 2015) and is the mother of politician Peeni Henare.
