= Robyn Bargh =

New Zealand book publishing executive

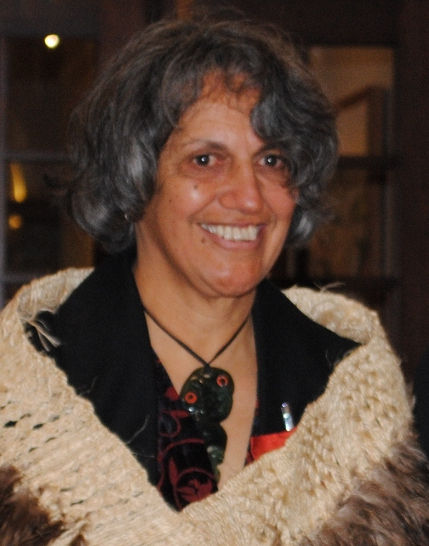
Bargh in 2012

Robyn Rangihuia Bargh CNZM (née Young) is a publisher and a director, council or board member of many organisations in the book industry and other arts-related organisations in New Zealand. Her work has been recognised with a number of prestigious awards including the Women in Publishing New Venture Award (1994), the Te Waka Toi Te Tohu Toi Kē Award (2006) and the Book Industry Lifetime Achievement Award (2018), and she was made a Companion of the New Zealand Order of Merit in the 2012 New Year Honours.

== Biography ==
Bargh was brought up on a farm in Horohoro, 15 km south of Rotorua and went to school in Rotorua. Her mother was Hepora Raharuhi and her father was Robert Young, and she grew up as Robyn Young. Bargh is of Ngāti Kea Ngāti Tuarā and Ngāti Awa descent. She trained as a teacher in Hamilton and studied for a Bachelor of Arts at Massey University, where in 1974 she met her future husband Brian Bargh, then studying for a Master of Agricultural Science.

Her career in publishing started in 1980 when she and Brian moved to Papua New Guinea for several years with their two children and Bargh worked as a researcher and editor at the University of Papua New Guinea. When they returned to New Zealand, she worked in editing, publishing and policy jobs in various government departments. In 1991, Bargh and her husband founded Huia Publishers with the aim of bringing a Māori perspective to New Zealand literature by encouraging Māori writers and revitalising the Māori language with the publication of Māori language and teaching and learning materials. In 1995, she established the Huia Short Story Awards for Maori Writers (now the Pikihuia Awards).

Huia Publishers was named from part of Bargh's own name, Rangihuia.

=== Boards and directorships ===
Bargh retired from her management role at Huia Publishers in 2014 but remains on the Board of Directors.

She is the Chair of the Māori Literature Trust, Deputy Chair of Te Rūnanga o Ngāti Kea Ngāti Tuara, Director of Te Puia, the New Zealand Māori Arts and Crafts Institute (huia), a member of the Victoria University Council and a trustee of the Herewahine Farms Trust. She has also been a member of the Council of the Publishers Association of New Zealand.

Robyn was a member of the Establishment Group for Māori Television and a trustee of Te Awhiorangi/Te Reo Māori Television Trust. She has chaired boards of Booksellers New Zealand and the theatre company Taki Rua Productions.

== Awards and honours ==
Bargh's work and achievements have been recognised with a number of awards. These include the Women in Publishing New Venture Award in 1994, the Te Waka Toi Te Tohu Toi Kē Award in 2006 and the Massey University 75th Anniversary Medal for Distinguished Service in 2002.

In the New Year Honours List 2012, she was made a Companion of the Order of New Zealand for services to the Māori language and publishing.

In August 2018, she received the 2018 Book Industry Lifetime Achievement Award, in recognition of her work as founder and director of Huia Publishers, and her role in continuing leadership in the field of Māori literature.

== Bibliography ==
- Stories on the Four Winds: Ngā Hau e Whā (edited by Brian Bargh and Robyn Bargh) (Huia Publishers, 2016)
