= Māori Art Market =

Art market in New Zealand

Māori Art Market is a biennial Toi Māori event in New Zealand, featuring art exhibitions, art sales, live art demonstrations (such as wood carving and tattooing), as well as presentations and master classes. It features traditional and contemporary Māori art by Māori artists. It was inspired by the Santa Fe Indian Market.

== About ==
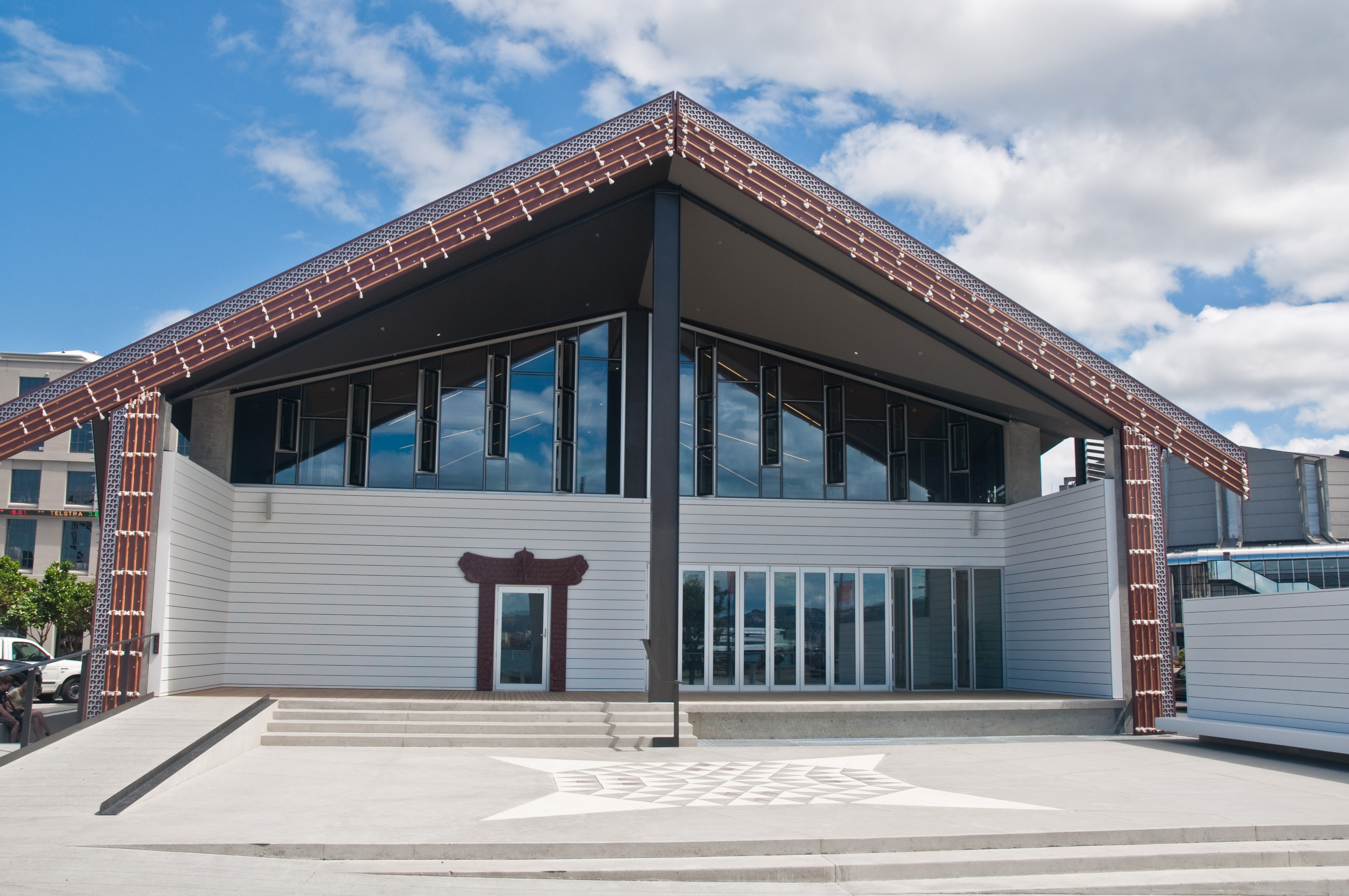
Te Wharewaka o Pōneke - the site of the 2017 and 2019 Māori Art Market

The genesis of the Market was Darcy Nicholas's Fulbright Studies in 1984, which proposed the idea to Ihakara Puketapu, Professor Ngatata Love of the Department of Maori Affairs and Glen Wiggs of the New Zealand Crafts Council. This led to the Roi Toia and June Grant working with Nigel Reading of the Spirit Wrestler Gallery in Vancouver. The markets are also linked to the 2010 World Art Market (WAM!) project held in Canada. The events are managed by Toi Māori Aotearoa, a government funded charitable trust for the promotion of Māori arts.

The first Māori Art Market was held in 2007 in the TSB Arena, Wellington. The second Market in 2009 was held in Te Rauparaha Arena, Porirua City. The third market was held 6th-9 October 2011 in Te Rauparaha Arena, Porirua City. It was part of New Zealand 2011, a series of events linked to the 2011 Rugby World Cup.

There was a market planned for December 2016 but the impact of an earthquake in New Zealand in November caused a postponement, due to the closure of Toi Māori's headquarters. It was held at Te Wharewaka o Pōneke, a venue on Wellington's waterfront 18 and 19 of March 2017. In 2019 the Māori Art Market was held again at Te Wharewaka o Pōneke and coincided with the national kapa haka competition Te Matatini. There were nearly 200 artists showcased.
