= Hōri Pukehika =

New Zealand Māori leader and woodcarver (1851–1932)

Hōri "George" Pukehika
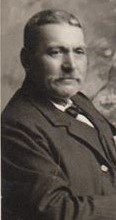
- Hōri "George" Pukehika, c. 1910
- Born: 23 March 1851; Pipiriki
- Died: 30 May 1932 (aged 81); Pungarehu Marae
- Other name: George Puk
- Education: learned from Kawana Moraro and his son, Utiku Mohuia, the official carvers for their iwi
- Known for: Wood carving, Native Sanitary Inspector, and a leader of Te Āti Haunui-a-Pāpārangi of the lower Whanganui River
- Notable work: panels for pa entry at Christchurch International Exhibition 1906, Te Waiherehere restoration 1921, a mantelpiece for Melbourne Exhibition, mantlepiece for Dunedin South Seas Exhibition
- Spouse: Pango Ngākaari then Tira Rātana
- Children: 3 daughters and 2 sons: Rawinia Pukehika Johnston (born 1902), Ngakari Tukia "Pango" Pukehika Park (1907–1971), George Hōri Pukehika (1906–1970), Tarawa Pukehika (1910–1959), and Ngamare Pukehika (1319–1948)
- Parents: Wikirini Te Tua (father); Peti Te Oiroa (mother)
- Awards: Māori War Medal

Hōri Pukehika (23 March 1851 – 30 May 1932) was a New Zealand Māori tribal leader and woodcarver.

== Youth and Family ==
Pukehika was born in Pipiriki, New Zealand. He was of the Ngatiruaka, Ngati Hinepango, Ngapaerangi, and Ngati Tuera hapū, and the iwi Te Ati Haunui-a-Paparangi. His father was Te Wikirini Te Tua of Te Āti Haunui-a-Pāpārangi iwi, and his mother was Peti Te Oiroa of Ngāti Pāmoana. When he was 17 years of age, he was among those who watched from the bank of the river as the chosen warriors fought in the battle of Moutoa Island in May 1864. He accompanied Te Keepa Te Rangihiwinui (also known as Major Kemp, the first Māori to command British soldiers) in pursuit of Te Kooti. He was honoured with the Māori War Medal for his bravery in 1869 at the Battle of Te Pōrere near Taupō, where Te Keepa attacked Te Kooti's pā. He was a popular orator for young men who looked up to him as the last of the great Māori warriors of the colonial wars.

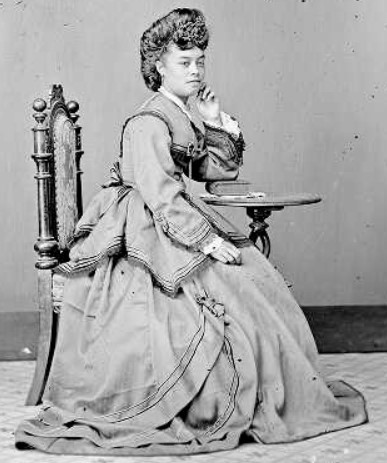
Pango Ngākaari Tukia of Rānana, Whanganui River c. 1868

In 1868 Hōri Pukehika married Pango Ngākaari Tukia of Rānana, Whanganui River. She, along with her two children, had been abandoned by Major Benjamin Trafford of the 65th Regiment who had been in Whanganui between 1847 and 1863 before he returned to England. Their son died young.

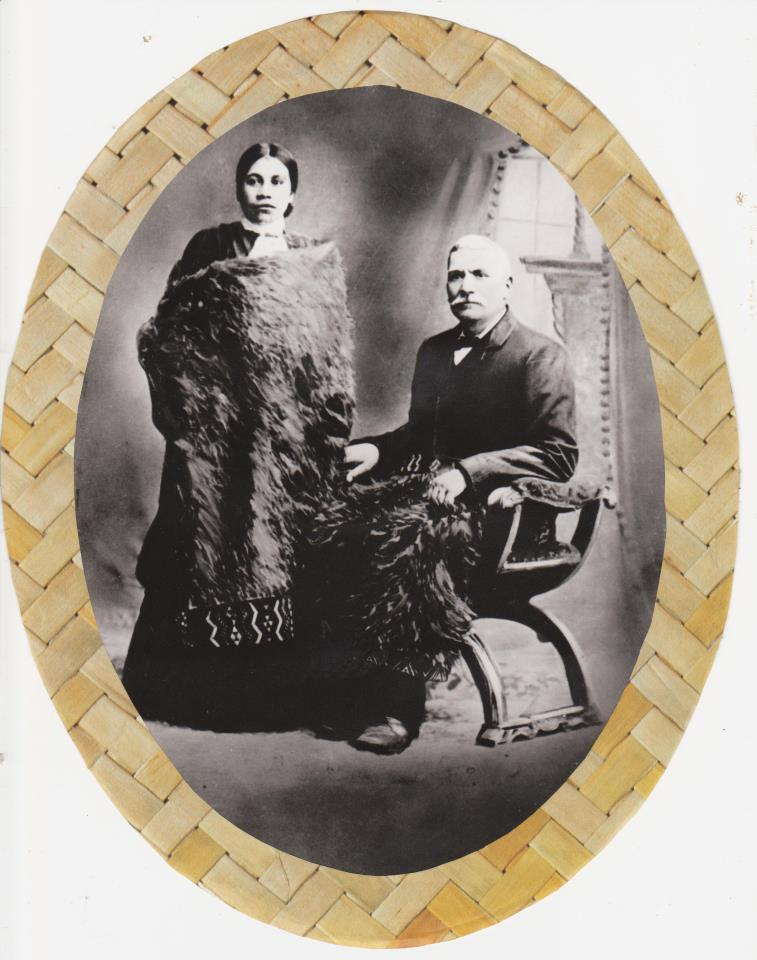
Erita "Tira" (born Rātana) and Hōri "George" Pukehika

Hōri Pukehika later married Tira Rātana (also known as Erita). According to the family descendants, he gifted his first wife Ngākaari a plot of land and included her as part of the family even after he married Erita. They lived in Putiki where they had five children: Rawinia Pukehika later Johnston (1902), George Hōri Pukehika (1906–1970), Ngakari Tukia "Pango" Pukehika later Park (1907–1971), Tarawa Pukehika (1910–1959), and Ngamare Pukehika (1913–1948). He was a strong supporter of the Rātana movement and believed in abstaining from alcohol.

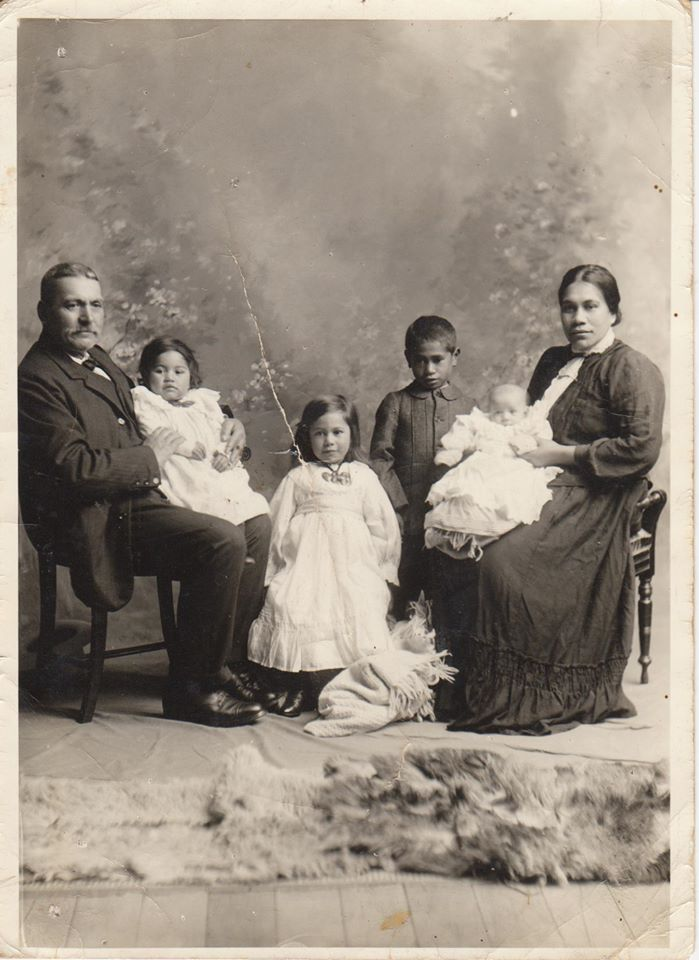
Pukehika family c. 1910

Hōri Pukehika served as a civic leader in his home community, and he coordinated the annual New Zealand riverboat and Māori canoe championships. He was a strong supporter of maintaining and enhancing Māori culture. While a young man, he had hidden the armour of Chief Hongi Hika, fearing that this precious artifact of early history—a gift from King George IV while Hongi was on a visit to England—would fall into the hands of European speculators. In 1908, while serving as the Native Sanitary Inspector he retrieved the armour which was then archived in the Dominion Museum in Wellington. He was elected a life member of the Whanganui Regional Museum board of trustees.

== His woodcarving ==
According to the Records of the Auckland Museum (2004), Pukehika worked with the following carvers: Te Paku-o-Te-Rangi 1877, Poutama 1888, Tawhitinui 1880s, and Maranganui 1905. His most famed works were a mantelpiece for the Melbourne International Exhibition (1880) and another for New Zealand and South Seas Exhibition (1889) in Dunedin, the entry to the model pā at the Christchurch International Exhibition (1906), and the Te Waiherehere restoration in 1921.

=== Christchurch International Exposition ===
He is best known for creating the entrance of the model pā at the New Zealand International Exhibition in Christchurch in 1906–07.

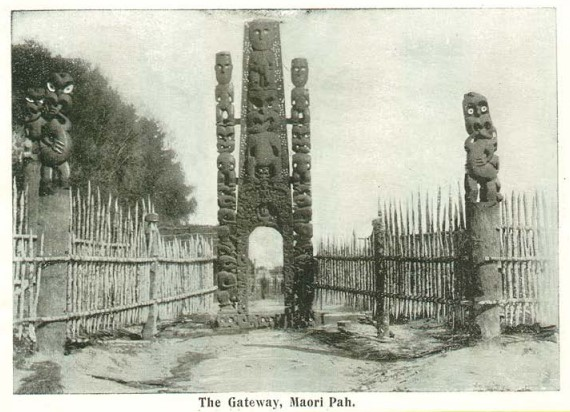
Entry to Maori pā at 1906 Christchurch International Exposition, carving by Hori Pukehika

His carving was reproduced and used on the cover of the souvenir booklet for the Exhibition. He and Tuta Niho-Niho lived at the model pā for nearly six months. Approximately 65,000 people visited the pā. His wife, Tira Rātana Pukehika, also attended and participated in various events. She was highlighted in the exposition report by James Cowan:

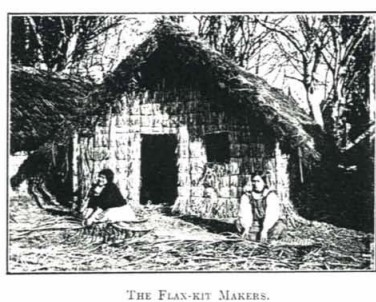
Tira Rātana aka Erita Pukehika (1868–1935), weaver at Christchurch International Exposition 1906–07, sitting at right in front of raupo house.

Amongst the handicrafts in which the Maoris employed themselves in the pa was the ancient art of weaving flax and feather mats or cloaks. One particularly fine specimen of a kahu-kiwi, or mat of kiwi (apteryz) feathers-the feathers are woven or stitched on the outside of a soft flax fabric-was made by Tiria Hori [sic], a young woman of the Ngatituera Tribe, from Pukerimu, on the Wanganui River. This beautiful cloak was ornamented with a handsome border of the pattern known as taniko: the dyes used were made from the bark of native trees—the toatoa for the red colouring, and the raurekau for the black.

Sir Peter Henry Buck KCMG DSO, also known as Te Rangi Hīroa or Te Rangihīroa, who led the exposition pā's sanitary infrastructure design and maintenance, admitted that he first learned about Māori weaving from by Tira Pukehika. He was quoted in a 1949 newspaper article: “If it weren’t for Tira's patience in the first place a subsequent paper I wrote on weaving would never have been recognised.” His paper brought him success and led to his receiving a Fellowship of the Royal Society of New Zealand.

== Death and legacy ==
Before his death in 1932, a complete carving of the whakamahau (verandah) of a wharepuni completed by Pukehika and Te Ture was presented by Trihapehi Parewa—granddaughter of Te Reimana, chief of Te Tawhitinui—to the Whanganui Regional Museum in 1930.

Hōri Pukehika died at Pungarehu on 30 May 1932, said to be aged 85, and was survived by his second wife Tira, three daughters and two sons. His portrait, a photograph taken in the 1920s, was mounted in the Whanganui Regional Museum. A Māori mantelpiece, brought from the great meeting house Waiherehere, at Koriniti (Whanganui River), was preserved in the Whanganui Regional Museum.

== References for Pukehika's woodcarving art ==
- Barns, E (1937). Little Journeys into the Lives of Notable Maori Chiefs and Chieftainesses of the W District, whose portraits hang in the Museum Building. Wanganui: Alexander Museum. pp. 10–13.
- Church, I. (1996). "Hori Pukehika". In Orange, C. (ed.). Dictionary of New Zealand Biography, Volume Three, 1901–1920. Auckland, NZ: Auckland University Press. pp. 410–411.
- Cresswell, J.C.M. (1977). Maori Meeting Houses of the North Island. Auckland, NZ: P.C.S. Publications. p. 108.
- Cowan, James (1910). Official Record of the New Zealand International Exhibition of Arts and Industrie. Held at Christchurch 1906-7. A Descriptive and Historical Account. Wellington: Government Printer. p. 330.
- Hardie, R. (1975). Ngati Pamoana: Koriniti: Whanganui River 1975. Wanganui: Koriniti Marae Committee. p. 19.
- McEwen, J.M. (1966). "Maori Art". In McLintock, A.H. (ed.). An Encyclopedia of New Zealand, Vol. 2. Wellington, NZ: R. E. Owen, Government Printer. p. 426.
- Phillipps, William J. (1955). Carved Maori Houses of Western and Northern Areas of New Zealand. Dominion Museum Monograph 9. Wellington, NZ: Government Printer. pp. 74, 86.
- Simmons, D.R. (1985). Whakairo: Maori Tribal Art. Auckland, NZ: Oxford University Press. p. 96.
- Simon, M.T. (2002). Taku Whare E: My home my heart. Volume 2. Whanganui: Moku Whanau Traust. p. 94.
- Sorrenson, Keith, ed. (1988). Na To Hoa Aroha: From Your Dear Friend. The Correspondence between Sir Apirana Ngata and Sir Peter Buck 1925–1950. Vol 3. Auckland, NZ: Auckland University Press. pp. 119, 165.
