= Pine Taiapa =

New Zealand wood carver, farmer, rehabilitation officer, writer and genealogist

- Born: 1901
- Died: 1972 (aged 70–71)
- Education: Te Aute College, New Zealand Māori Arts and Crafts Institute
- Known for: Māori carving on wharenui
- Spouse: Mereaira Te Ruawai Taiapa.

Pineamine "Pine" Taiapa (1901–1972) was a notable New Zealand wood carver, farmer, rehabilitation officer, writer, and genealogist. He was one of the first students of the School of Māori Arts in Rotorua under Āpirana Ngata. As a carver, he was part of over ninety-nine wharenui (Māori meeting houses) around New Zealand.

== Biography ==
Taiapa was born in Tikitiki, East Coast, New Zealand, in 1901, to Tamati Taiapa and Maraea Iritawa Taiapa (née Potae). Of Māori descent, he identified with the Ngāti Porou iwi. His secondary school education was at Te Aute College in Hawkes Bay.

His earliest carving teacher was master carver Hone Ngatoto, who invited him to work alongside him on the Tikitiki War Memorial Church. The building of this memorial, St. Mary's Church in Tikitiki, was instigated by Ngāti Porou leader Āpirana Ngata in the early 1920s and is regarded as 'one of the most beautiful Māori churches in New Zealand'.

Taiapa went on to be one of the first students under Āpirana Ngata at the School of Māori Arts in Rotorua in 1927 which became the New Zealand Māori Arts and Crafts Institute. Between 1947 and 1940, Taiapa worked on over sixty wharenui (meeting houses). Taiapa was then a soldier in World War II, part of the Māori Battalion. On his return, he went back to carving and worked on a further thirty-nine wharenui.

== Personal life and death ==
He married Mereaira Te Ruawai Taiapa, by whom he had a child. His younger brother Hōne Taiapa was also a carver. He died in Tikitiki on 9 February 1972, age 70.
