= Hōne Taiapa =

Māori wood carver and carpenter

Hōne Taiapa MBE
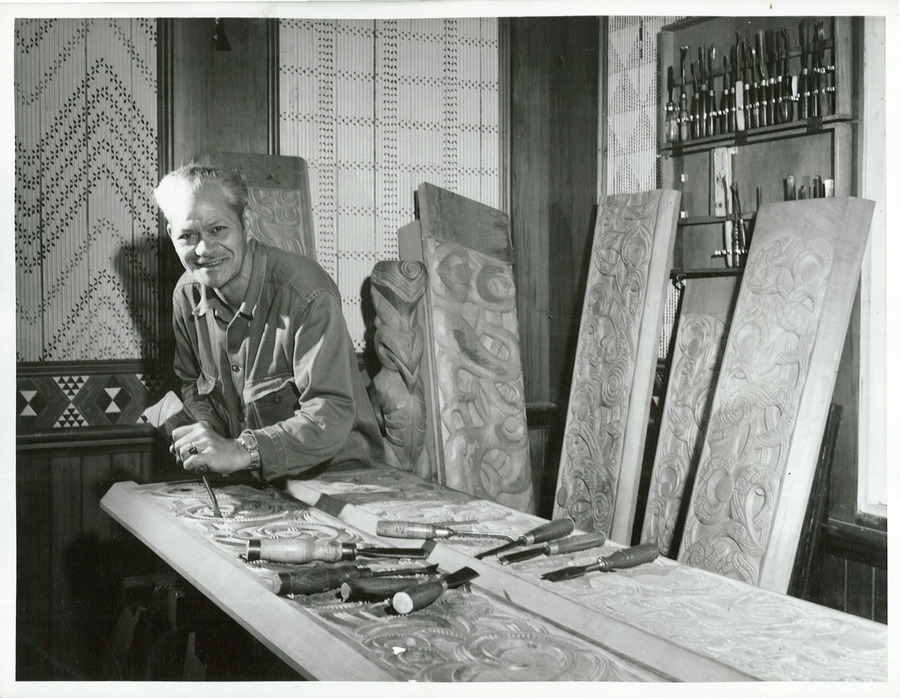
- Taiapa at NZMACI in 1966
- Born: Hōne Te Kāuru Taiapa; 10 August 1912; Tikitiki, New Zealand
- Died: 10 May 1979 (aged 66); Rotorua, New Zealand
- Other name: John Taiapa
- Occupation: Carver
- Relatives: Pine Taiapa (brother)

Hōne Te Kāuru Taiapa MBE (10 August 1912 – 10 May 1979), also known as John Taiapa, was a Māori master wood carver (tohunga whakairo) and carpenter of Ngāti Porou. He was the younger brother of master Māori carver Pine Taiapa. The two brothers worked closely with politician Sir Āpirana Ngata on reintroducing the Māori arts & crafts to the country after World War II. Both men, for example, demonstrated Māori carving skills by carving and restoring lost or damaged traditional marae all along the North Island of New Zealand alongside fellow carvers or students they had been training as part of a programme by the New Zealand Department of Education to educate teachers to reintroduce Māori arts and crafts to school children. New Zealand poet Hone Tuwhare included a poem about the wood carver, "On a theme by Hone Taiapa", in his 1973 collection Something Nothing.

== Early life ==
Taiapa was born at Tikitiki on the East Coast in 1912, one of 14 children of Tāmati Taiapa and Maraea Te Iritawa. In the early 1930s he went to assist his brother Pine, who was a student of carving at a school of Māori arts and crafts that had been established at Ohinemutu in Rotorua in 1927. The brothers studied under Rotohiko Haupapa, an Arawa carver. Haupapa died in 1932 and Eramiha Kapua took over teaching at the school. Kapua told his students not to bother with tapu observances around carving, in case they got it wrong. The first building Hone Taiapa worked on was Te Hono ki Rarotonga at Tokomaru Bay, in 1934. Between 1934 and 1937 he worked on buildings at Otaki, Waitara, Ruatoria and on the assembly hall at Te Aute College, as well as assisting with the meeting house at Waitangi.

A 1959 article discussed how Pine and Hone Taiapa approached different tribal styles of carving:

When Pine and John started carving, tribal sentiments were very much more pronounced than they are to-day. Their earliest teacher, Rotohiko Haupapa, it seems, was not very happy about teaching men of other tribes and Pine and John used East Coast models for their earliest work, rather than trespass on what was thought of as a closed Arawa domain. So, by the time Te Hono Ki Rarotonga was finished, they knew the style of Ngati Porou. However, wider knowledge was needed for their next big job, the Waitangi house. This house contains slabs carved in five different styles: East Coast, Gisborne, Arawa, Whanau Apanui and Ngapuhi. John recalls how the carving team managed the Ngapuhi style which at that time was entirely forgotten and had not been practised for over a century: they stayed in Auckland for a while and carved small models of Ngapuhi work they found in the Auckland Museum. This was the only time small models were made; later when they had to carve in the Taranaki style for the house in Waitara, it was easy to imitate the style just by looking at the models in the museum. By then, the principle had been accepted that a practised modern carver may have to use several tribal styles, according to the area where the house was built.

By the time the Waitangi meeting house was completed in 1937, Hone "considered himself a full trained carver".

== Career ==
The Rotorua School of Maori Arts and Crafts closed during World War 2 then reopened with Taiapa as an instructor and later head of the school. The school closed in the late 1950s. During this period Taiapa also worked as a builder to supplement his carving work.

Taiapa led the team of carvers that carved most of the pieces for Arohanui ki te Tangata in Lower Hutt, which was opened in September 1960.

In the 1960 Queen's Birthday Honours, Taiapa was appointed a Member of the Order of the British Empire, for cultural services to the Māori people, especially in the field of wood carving.

In 1963 the New Zealand Māori Arts and Crafts Institute was established by an Act of Parliament.Taiapa became the head of the Institute's Wood Carving School at Whakarewarewa, Rotorua when it opened in 1967. He then trained and guided the next generation of master carvers to take his place; he died in 1979. Notable disciples of Taiapa are Rangi Hetet, Clive Fugill and James Rickard, all now widely considered as 'tohunga whakairo' or master carvers.
