= Māori renaissance =

Cultural movement in New Zealand

The Māori renaissance, as a turning point in New Zealand's history, describes a loosely defined period between 1970 and the early 2000s, in which Māori took the lead in turning around the decline of their culture and language that had been occurring since the early days of European settlement. In doing so, social attitudes towards Māori among other New Zealanders also changed.

== 1800–1969, background ==
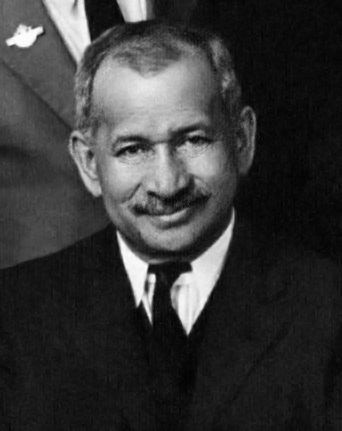
Āpirana Ngata, 1934

At the start of the twentieth century the Māori population had been in sharp decline, primarily due to exposure to European diseases: it had then reached a low point of fewer than 50,000 people, from a total population of over 800,000. However, the population increased thereafter as natural immunity began to set in. Politically too, change was afoot. After European settlement began, Māori had become increasingly concerned that their culture and language were being marginalised. Until 1914, and possibly later, the perception of the Māori race by Pakeha was that it was capable and worthy of being saved but only by assimilation into a European system. James Carroll, a Māori member of parliament who became the first Māori to win a European electorate, at Waiapu in 1887, and who later served in cabinet, took a similar view. He believed Māori: "...could succeed very well in European society." In general terms, he thought Māori should concentrate on a rural existence while leaving the towns to non-Māori. From a group called the Young Māori Party, formed in the 1890s and also following the line of a more rural, separate Māori development, there emerged a new leader of the Māori cause, Āpirana Ngata. He became the first Māori to obtain a degree, in 1893, and he went on to become a respected, long-serving MP, from 1905 to 1943. Ngata too worked on land based policies for Māori, which had led to a blossoming in Māori art and culture. In 1939, the Second World War began; many Māori were exposed to a world outside New Zealand and were placed in positions of authority within the armed forces, such as in the Māori Battalion, positions they could not have achieved in their rural idylls back home. When they returned, a rapid drift into the cities took place and as Māori became increasingly urbanised, concerns again grew that despite the benefits of assimilation, such as better healthcare, Māori culture and language were dying out.

== 1970–75 ==
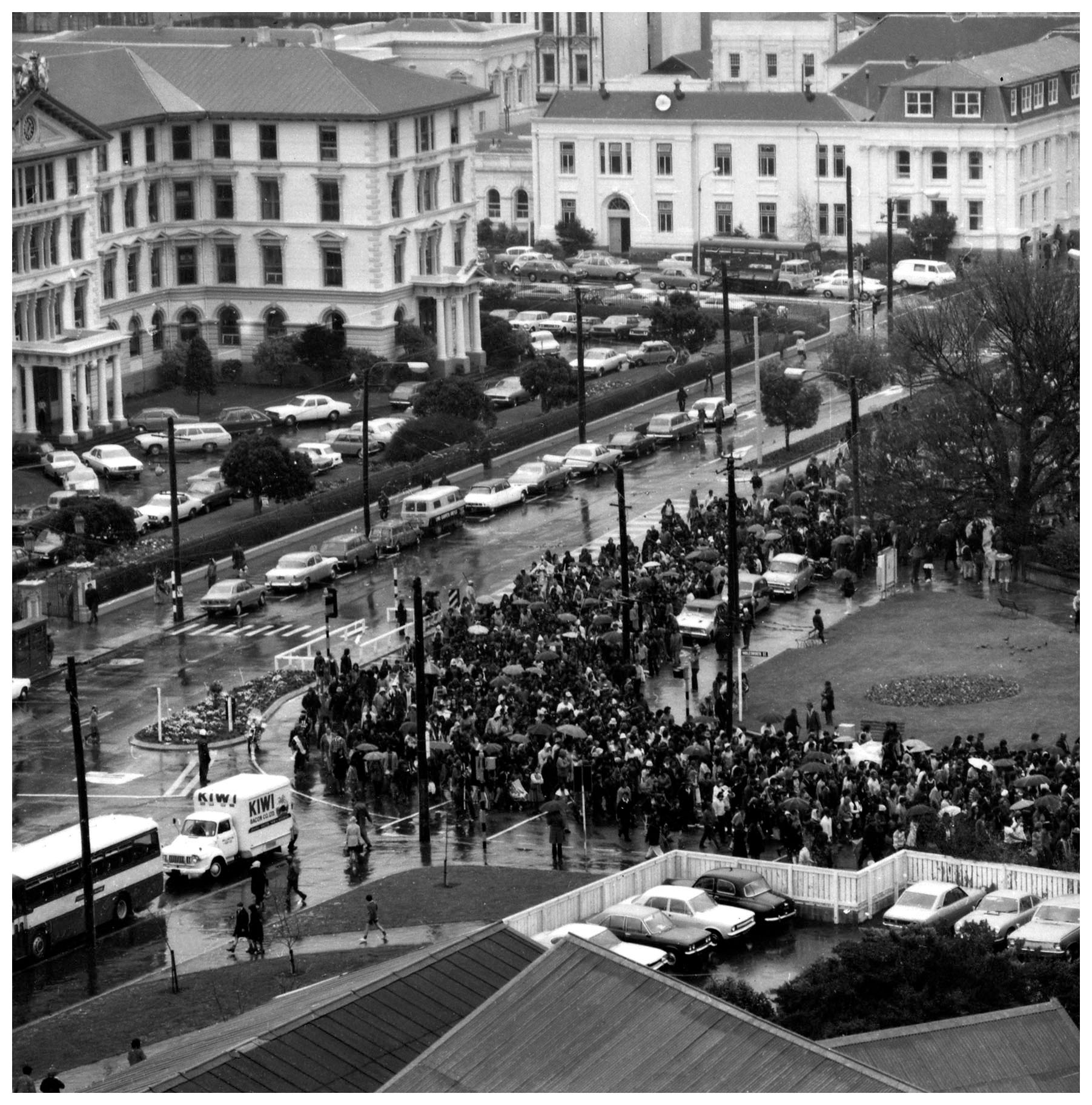
Māori Land March – 13 October 1975, outside Parliament in Wellington

By the start of the 1970s, a new generation of young, educated Māori looked for ways to redress the decline and to breathe new life into what survived of Māori culture. Ngā Tamatoa (the Young Warriors) was a group formed by Auckland University students and, by 1972, it had branches in Wellington and Christchurch. One of its leaders said at the time there was that "rage" at what had been lost and at how Māori "had become assimilated pseudo-Pakeha". The group chose to protest, focusing on the challenges facing Māori then, not on past grievances. Protest began on Waitangi Day, 6 February 1971, when Ngā Tamatoa disrupted Rob Muldoon, the Finance Minister's, speech at Waitangi and a flag-burning incident took place. In 1975, a hīkoi (land march) led by Whina Cooper traversed the length of the North Island and finished outside the Parliament building in Wellington. Thousands had joined the march, illustrating how Māori concerns about the loss of their culture and landholdings were reaching the wider public. This was followed by the Bastion Point occupation in 1977–78. In 1975, the Treaty of Waitangi Act was passed, creating the Waitangi Tribunal with judicial powers to inquire into Crown breaches of the Treaty.

== 1976–2002 ==
Māori identified an urgent need to address the declining use of the Māori language (te reo Māori). Promoting use of Māori was seen as the cornerstone of Māori cultural growth. From the early 1980s, the kōhanga reo movement of language nests was started, and this was followed by the creation of kura kaupapa in which schooling in Māori took place. By 1996, there were 765 kōhanga in the country. Most of the funding for this came from Māori communities, not central government. In 1987, the Māori Language Act came into force. It made Māori an official language and it created the Māori Language Commission, which says it focuses on "promoting te reo as a living language and an ordinary means of communication".

By 1979, both main parties had recognised that New Zealand was ethnically diverse and in principle they had accepted the argument that Māori should be able to follow their own path and not be drowned within Pākehā mores. The Labour government of the mid-1980s maintained the ongoing reforms. A bi-cultural approach to government policies had begun to set in. In 1985, the Treaty of Waitangi Act was amended to give the Tribunal jurisdiction to cover claims going back to 1840, opening the way for numerous further claims from disgruntled iwi and hapū. Although the list of tangible benefits to Māori from the Treaty grew ever larger in the late 1980s, such as huge government payments to settle Tribunal claims, the non-Māori public were generally dissatisfied. To assuage more the nation's conscience than to better inform the public of historical reality around the Treaty, the sesquicentenary of its signing in 1990 was a choreographed theatrical exercise reflecting better what the nation wanted to see rather than to inform about underlying historical issues. The past was remolded to appeal to the electorate. Ongoing Treaty settlements well into the hundreds of millions of dollars had begun: by 2001, and partly as a result of Treaty settlements, Māori assets had reached NZ$8.99 billion. Tribunal work relating to Treaty principals began to appear in legislation: by 1999, action related to the Treaty was required in eleven statutes from a total of 29 in which the Treaty was mentioned. Elsewhere, the Te Maori art exhibition (1984–1987) saw Māori art exhibited internationally for the first time.

By the 1990s, the fundamentals of a Māori recovery were well entrenched, and Māori advancement continued despite ongoing obstacles, such as the slow pace of Treaty settlements and a downturn in the economy. By 2000, the percentage of Māori in higher education, skilled and managerial roles had increased. Activism returned in the 1990s, carried out by some who wanted further advances. Moutoa Gardens in Whanganui were occupied in 1995 by iwi claiming ownership rights and in Auckland, One Tree Hill's lone pine was damaged. Parliamentary changes took place as well. MMP was introduced at the 1996 General Election and by 2002 the number of designated Māori seats had risen from four to seven. In 2002, there were 20 Māori MPs in a parliament of around 120 seats.

== 2003–present, post-renaissance developments and reflection ==
The year 2004 saw the founding of the Māori Party, to date New Zealand's most successful Māori-specific party. Founded by former Labour MP Tariana Turia, the party gained four seats in the following year's general election. In the 2008 election, its seats increased to five, and the party also won seats in 2011 and 2014. In 2008, the party entered a loose alliance with the National Party, firstly as part of the opposition, and in 2011 and 2014 as a minor partner in government. Disaffection with National led to a slump in support in the Māori Party in 2017, and it won no seats.

Concerns have been raised about the scope of the Waitangi Tribunal extending back to 1840, because "the past is interpreted by legal reasoning to suit presentist purposes." Historians will interpret the past differently from lawyers, using diachronic rather than a lawyer's synchronic analysis. By allowing claims back to 1840, it has been argued that the reality of what happened in the past, based on the values of that past time, is being altered because it is being judged in the context of contemporary norms, which is unfair.

Joseph Williams became the first Māori person appointed to the Supreme Court, in 2019. Since the 1970s, the Renaissance has been a significant literary movement. It stresses a separate form of Māori nationalism, with its own forms of expression and its own history, that can be seen as representing a new post-colonial New Zealand. An established catalogue of notable authors has emerged, including Keri Hulme and Witi Ihimaera.

Proportional to the total New Zealand population, people claiming to be of Māori descent represented 8 percent in 1966 and about 14 percent in 1996.

== See also ==
- Māori language revival
- Treaty of Waitangi claims and settlements
- Māori protest movement

== Bibliography ==
- King, Michael (2004). The Penguin History of New Zealand Illustrated. Penguin Group (NZ). ISBN 978-014300669-5.
- Moon, Paul (2013). Turning Points – Events that changed the course of New Zealand history. New Holland. pp. 191–203. ISBN 978-1-86966-379-7.
