= Toi Māori Aotearoa =

New Zealand Māori arts charitable trust

Toi Māori Aotearoa (English: Māori Arts New Zealand) is a charitable trust that promotes Māori traditional arts and Māori artists, both in New Zealand and overseas.

Much of Toi Māori's funding comes indirectly from the government, through Creative New Zealand, Te Puni Kōkiri, etc.

Toi Māori receives major funding from Creative New Zealand (Arts Council of New Zealand) to retain networks of artists across a broad range of contemporary arts practice supported by a network of 10 national art form committees. Its activities are exemplified by national gatherings of artists where exhibitions, workshops, presentations, discussions and debates update artists on current trends and opportunities. These national gatherings increasingly identify and promote the new leadership within contemporary Māori arts. Two limited liability companies are used to undertake major international projects. A project company and an event company. Examples are the Toi Māori Art Market occurring every two years in the Wellington region. At this major showcase of the visual arts, indigenous artists join guest artists from the Pacific Rim including Asia, Australia, USA and Canada. In 2005 Maori Art Meets America was a collaborative effort with Air New Zealand and Tourism New Zealand. From that very successful promotion, the idea of a New Zealand-based showcase was conceived resulting in the Toi Māori Art Market. These have been held in 2007, 2009, 2011, 2014, 2016/17. In 2010 Toi Maori established a relationship with the National Museum of the Netherlands and currently has a large ornately carved ceremonial canoe(waka) based there. This waka called Te Hono ki Aotearoa (The binds to New Zealand) has featured in events in the Netherlands London and will continue to feature at special events in Europe art festivals.
