= Moko (Tapuika) =

Moko, sometimes known as Moko-tangata-kotahi or Nga Moko-o-Tauaroa, was a Māori rangatira (chief) of the Tapuika iwi within the Te Arawa confederation of tribes in the area around Paengaroa, Bay of Plenty. He gathered the tribe together after the murder of his maternal uncle Marukukere by a group of settlers from the east and led them to victory over the easterners at the Battle of Omaro-poporo. He is the ancestor of the hapu Ngāti Moko.

== Life ==
Moko's mother was Puriti, through whom he was a direct descendant of Tapuika, who travelled on the Arawa from Hawaiki. Puriti was married to Tahere of Tanui, but, while he was away, she had an affair with Tauaroa of Ngāti Maniapoto. Tauaroa instructed her to name the child Moko ("facial tattoo") after his facial tattoo if it was a boy and Raparapa ("sole") if it was a girl, and then left. When Tahere found out about the pregnancy, he sent her away to her brother Marukukere at Waitangi in the Bay of Plenty. There she gave birth to a boy, who was named Moko in accordance with his birth father's instructions. Marukukere raised Moko until he was an adult and then sent him to Waikato to live with his father Tauaroa.

=== Battle of Omaro-poporo ===
After the conquest of Maketu by Rangihouhiri, Marukukere had allowed a group of people from the east, led by Nainai or Kahu, to settle in the area of Paengaroa, Maketu, and Rangiuru in return for helping Tapuika with the work at harvest time. Eventually, these settlers chafed under this obligation, so they murdered Marukukere, when he visited them at their pā (Rangiuru or Huimanuka), and ate him. Tapuika attempted to take revenge for the killing under the command of Marukukere's cousin Tawakeheimoa, but in a battle sometimes called Omaro-poporo, he was defeated and killed.

When Moko learnt of Marukukere's death and the subsequent defeat, he returned to the Bay of Plenty along with his two sons, Te Rangituapake and Tuhuatahi. He gathered all the people of Tapuika together at Ohinewhiti and Opiki. once they had made their plans, Moko went to a place near Pakotore (either Taengaoteureomai or Rorakonui), where a powerful tohunga called Kaiongaonga, performed a range of special rites in order to bring Moko victory in the forthcoming conflict.

After this, Moko led his forces out to battle at Punakauia, on the Kaituna River, near Canaan / Kenana. This battle was called Omaro-poporo. Nainai attacked first and, as his men charged, Moko ordered his son Te Rangituapake to lead the counter-attack, but he refused out of fear. Moko asked his second son, Tuhuatahi, to lead the counter-attack instead, which Tuhuatahi did, with great success. After a long fight, the forces of Tapuika were compelled to withdraw to their fortress. Nainai besieged them, but Mako and Tuhuatahi regrouped, led the men out and routed the enemy. Nainai was killed, along with most of his warriors. Some of the defeated enemy stayed in the region as Ngati Kahu, a hapu of Tapuika which still existed as of 1894, others settled at Te Tuahuaoteatua in Tauranga as Ngaetane, and yet others went to Taupo and Opoutihi.

As a result of his leadership in this war, Mako became the leading rangatira of Tapuika. Thereafter, Tapuika lived in peace with Ngati Whakahinga, who held Maketu by this point.

== Family and legacy ==
Moko married while he was living with Tauaroa in Waikato and had two sons:

- Te Rangituapake
- Tuhuatahi, who was born with a hunchback

The hapu Ngati Moko is descended from Moko. They have a marae at Te Puke, called Ngāti Moko Marae, with a wharenui called Mokotangatakotahi, in Moko's honour.

== Bibliography ==
- Stafford, D.M. (1967). Te Arawa: A History of the Arawa People. Rotorua, New Zealand: A.H. & A.W. Reed.
- Stokes, Evelyn Mary (1992). Te Raupatu o Tauranga Moana: Vol 2 Documents relating to tribal history, confiscation and reallocation of Tauranga lands. Waitangi Tribunal.
- Tarakawa, Takaanui; Smith, Percy (1893). "Ko te Hoenga mai o te Arawa, Raua ko Tainui i Hawaiki / The Coming of Te Arawa and Tainui Canoes from Hawaiki to New Zealand". Journal of the Polynesian Society. 2: 220–252.
