= Bill Gray (rugby union) =

New Zealand rugby union player

- Born: William Ngataiawhio Gray; 23 December 1932 Te Puke, New Zealand
- Died: 10 January 1993 (aged 60) Rotorua, New Zealand
- Height: 1.80 m (5 ft 11 in)
- Weight: 82 kg (181 lb)
- School: Te Puke High School

Rugby union career
- Position: Second five-eighth
Provincial / State sides
Years	Team	Apps	(Points)
1950–1966	Bay of Plenty		
International career
Years	Team	Apps	(Points)
1955–1957	New Zealand	6	(0)
–	New Zealand Maori		

William Ngataiawhio Gray (23 December 1932 – 10 January 1993) was a New Zealand rugby union player. A second five-eighth, Gray represented Bay of Plenty at a provincial level, and was a member of the New Zealand national side, the All Blacks, from 1955 to 1957. He played 11 matches for the All Blacks including six internationals.

Affiliating to Te Arawa and Tapuika, Gray was a New Zealand Maori representative and captain. In 1956, he was awarded the Tom French Cup for Māori rugby union player of the year.

An accomplished tennis player, Gray won the New Zealand Māori tennis championship in 1950.

Awards
Preceded by Pat Walsh	Tom French Memorial; Māori rugby union player of the year 1956	Succeeded by Muru Walters
