= Hayden Reid =

- Full name: Hayden Brian Reid
- Born: 24 January 1978 (age 48)
- School: Te Puke High School
- University: University of Otago
- Occupation: Pastor

Rugby union career
- Position: Fullback / Centre / Wing
Senior career
Years	Team	Apps	(Points)
2006–08	Rugby Viadana		
2008–10	Rugby Roma		
Provincial / State sides
Years	Team	Apps	(Points)
1999–01	Otago	32	(60)
2002–03	North Harbour	12	(15)
2005–06	Bay of Plenty	17	(5)
Super Rugby
Years	Team	Apps	(Points)
2001	Highlanders	1	(0)
2002	Blues	2	(0)
National sevens team
Years	Team		Comps
- New Zealand 7s

Hayden Brian Reid (born 24 January 1978) is a New Zealand former professional rugby union player and rugby sevens international. He is now a Pastor with the Curate Church.

== Biography ==
Reid was raised on a kiwifruit orchard in Te Puke and attended Te Puke High School.

A utility back, Reid began playing with Otago in 1999 after moving to Dunedin for university and he appeared once for the Highlanders during the 2001 Super 12 season. He returned to the north island in 2002 and played twice for the Blues while attached to North Harbour. After two years back home competing with the Bay of Plenty, Reid played professional rugby in Italy from 2006 to 2010, with two seasons each at Viadana and Roma.

Reid is a former maths teacher at Tauranga Boys College and has been a Pastor from 2014 to 2024 before returning to Tauranga Boys College.
