= Joan Chapple =

New Zealand's first plastic and hand surgeon, also a photographer (1934–2013)

Joan Chapple CNZM
- Born: Shirley Joan Chapple; 10 March 1934; Te Puke, New Zealand
- Died: 22 May 2013 (aged 79)
- Education: University of Otago
- Known for: First female plastic and hand surgeon in New Zealand
- Awards: New Zealand Suffrage Centennial Medal

Shirley Joan Chapple CNZM (10 March 1934 – 22 May 2013) was New Zealand's first female plastic and hand surgeon. She was also a photographer and author.

== Early life and education ==
Chapple was the middle child of five children of Kingsley and Winifred Chapple. Chapple and her siblings were educated at Te Matai Primary School in the Bay of Plenty, where Kingsley Chapple was headmaster. Chapple was a cousin of Maurice Gee. Chapple went on to Te Puke High School, and Epsom Girls' Grammar School.

She completed a year at the University of Auckland before being accepted to the medical school at the University of Otago. Chapple excelled, being awarded the Stanley Wilson Prize when she graduated with distinction in surgery in 1957. She was one of nine female graduates among more than 90 students.

== Career ==
Chapple returned to Auckland as a house surgeon, and completed her FRACS in general surgery in 1963. She was the second woman in New Zealand to gain a specialist surgical qualification, after Jean Sandel earned FRCS in 1947 and FRACS in 1957.

Chapple travelled overseas for postgraduate training, visiting Australia, Britain, and Russia. She worked with hand surgeon Paul Brand in India, and then travelled to the US, although this trip was cut short due to an accusation of anti-American activities.

Chapple was appointed to the Plastic Surgical Unit at Middlemore Hospital on her return in the 1960s, working with William Maxwell Manchester.

As the only woman surgeon, Chapple was unable to attend the regular meetings of the surgical fraternity, which took place at the male-only Northern Club. Her exclusion was made worse when she became an unmarried mother in 1972. She was denied maternity leave and dismissed from her post, which occasioned public controversy.

Chapple was appointed later to a part-time role in Auckland Hospital's accident and emergency department. Chapple practised techniques which were considered unorthodox at the time. Specifically, she taught the importance of handling tissues gently, the role of haemostasis, maintain blood supply to tissues, and avoidance of unnecessary sutures. Chapple's ideas were not accepted among other surgeons. In 1980 Chapple self-published a book explaining her approach, Wound Care and Healing: The Physiological Challenge. The book, which included case studies and her own photographs, was expanded and reprinted in 2001.

Some of Chapple's photographs are held at Te Papa.

Chapple died on 22 May 2013, and was survived by her daughter and granddaughter.

== Awards and honours ==
In 1993, Chapple was awarded the New Zealand Suffrage Centennial Medal.

In the 2001 Queen's Birthday Honours, Chapple appointed a Companion of the New Zealand Order of Merit, for services to medicine and the community.

== Publications ==
- Shirley Joan Chapple (1 January 2003). Wound Care and Healing: The Physiological Challenge. ISBN 978-0-473-09601-4. Wikidata Q108864144.
- The management of soft tissue conditions and injuries : philosophy, principles and practice : a handbook for the care of wounds, 1991, Auckland; Allen & Hanburys
- Scarred for Life, a 1987 DVD co-authored with David Clark and the Lopdell Centre, on the dangers of amateur tattoos.
- Suturing of Wounds, Ingrowing toenails, and Crush Injuries and Complex Lacerations, 1983 video tapes produced by the Audiovisual Centre, University of Auckland
