= Mangorewa River =

- Route of the Mangorewa River
- Mouth of the Mangorewa River Mangorewa River (North Island)

Location
- Country: New Zealand

Physical characteristics
- Source
  - location: Mamaku Plateau
  - coordinates: 38°00′25″S 176°05′10″E
- Mouth
  - location: Paraiti River
  - coordinates: 37°57′37″S 176°10′18″E

Basin features
- Progression: Mangorewa River → Paraiti River → Kaituna River → Bay of Plenty

The Mangorewa River is a river of the Rotorua Lakes District and the Bay of Plenty Region of New Zealand's North Island. It flows northeast from its sources on the Mamaku Plateau northwest of Lake Rotorua. The Paraiti River begins at the confluence of the Mangorewa River and the Ohaupara Stream.

== Geography ==
The Mangorewa Scenic Reserve is located on the right banks of the Mangorewa River, adjacent to Tauranga Direct Road.

== History ==
Prior to the Tapuika Claims Settlement Act 2014, the name Paraiti River was used on some maps for both the Mangorewa River and lower Paraiti River.

== See also ==
- List of rivers of New Zealand
