= Marukukere =

Marukukere was a Māori rangatira (chief) of the Tapuika iwi within the Te Arawa confederation of tribes in the area around Paengaroa, Bay of Plenty. He welcomed a group of tribes from outside the Arawa region onto his land and was killed by them as a result. He is the eponymous ancestor of the hapu Ngāti Marukukere.

== Life ==
Marukukere was a direct descendant of Tapuika, who travelled on the Arawa from Hawaiki. He had one sister Puriti, who was married to Tahere of Tanui, but got pregnant with Tauaroa of Ngāti Maniapoto. When he found out, Tahere sent her back to Marukukere at Waitangi, where she had the child, Moko. He lived around the same time that Rangihouhiri brought Ngāi Te Rangi into the Bay of Plenty region.

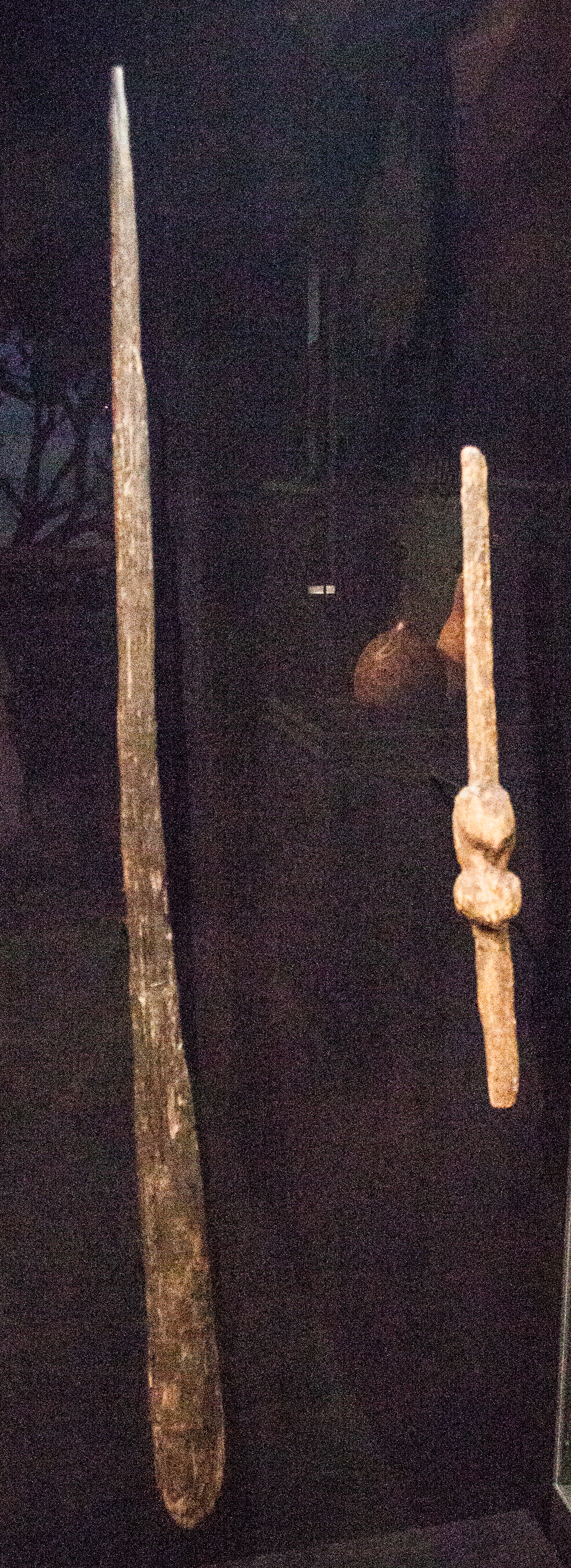
Two kō (digging sticks).

When Marukukere was the dominant leader of Tapuika, a group of people arrived from the east, led by Nainai or Kahu, and asked to settle in the area of Paengaroa, Maketu, and Rangiuru Marukukere allowed them to do this in return for helping them with the work at harvest time. When the time came around, Marukukere would send his dog Kauaeranga to the settlers with a kō (digging stick) in its mouth, to tell them that it was time. Eventually, they decided that this practice was insulting so they cooked and ate the dog. When Marukukere came to the settlers' pā at Rangiuru or Huimanuka to find out what happened to the dog, the people cooked and ate Marukukere too.

Tapuika attempted to take revenge for the killing under the command of Tawakeheimoa, but in a battle sometimes called Omaro-poporo, he was defeated and killed. Subsequently, Marukukere's nephew, Moko, gathered the people of Tapuika at Ohinewhiti and Opiki and led them to total victory over the settlers in a second battle of Omaro-poporo.

== Bibliography ==
- Stafford, D.M. (1967). Te Arawa: A History of the Arawa People. Rotorua, New Zealand: A.H. & A.W. Reed.
- Stokes, Evelyn Mary (1992). Te Raupatu o Tauranga Moana: Vol 2 Documents relating to tribal history, confiscation and reallocation of Tauranga lands. Waitangi Tribunal.
