= Michael Hardie Boys =

Governor-General of New Zealand from 1996 to 2001

The Right Honourable Sir Michael Hardie Boys GNZM GCMG QSO KStJ
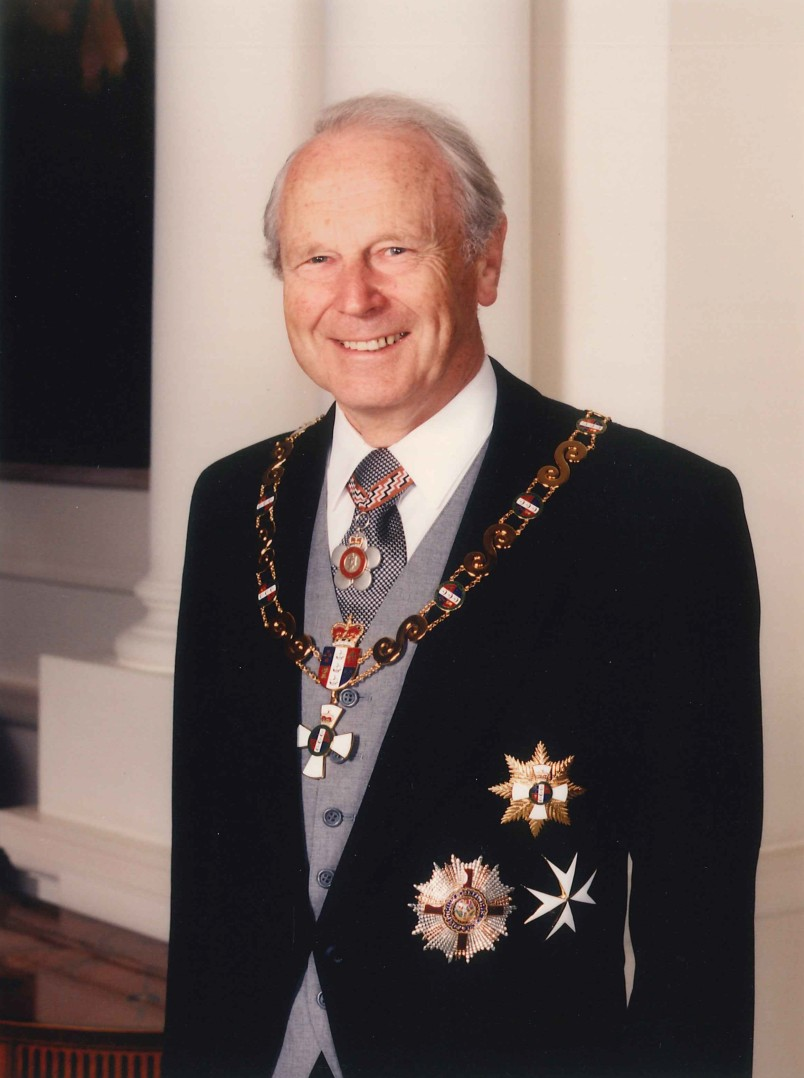

17th Governor-General of New Zealand
- In office 21 March 1996 – 21 March 2001
- Monarch: Elizabeth II
- Prime Minister: Jim Bolger; Jenny Shipley; Helen Clark
- Preceded by: Dame Catherine Tizard
- Succeeded by: Dame Silvia Cartwright

Personal details
- Born: 6 October 1931 Wellington, New Zealand
- Died: 29 December 2023 (aged 92) Waikanae, New Zealand
- Spouse: Mary Zohrab (m. 1957)
- Relatives: Reginald Hardie Boys (father)
- Profession: Lawyer; jurist

Sir Michael Hardie Boys (6 October 1931 – 29 December 2023) was the 17th governor-general of New Zealand from 1996 to 2001. A lawyer and jurist by profession, Hardie Boys was put forward as governor-general by Prime Minister Jim Bolger, in part for his understanding of constitutional law. This was an important factor, as in 1996 the country was about to hold its first election under mixed-member proportional representation (MMP).

Prior to appointment as governor-general, he sat on the High Court (then called the "Supreme Court"), the Court of Appeal and was appointed a Privy Counsellor.

== Early life and family ==
Hardie Boys was born in 1931 in Wellington, the son of Edith May (née Bennett) and Reginald Hardie Boys (1903–1970), a lawyer and later judge of the Supreme Court. After his schooling at Hataitai School and Wellington College, Hardie Boys gained a Bachelor of Arts and Bachelor of Laws from Victoria University College in 1954. Hardie Boys married Mary Zohrab, a great-granddaughter of Octavius Hadfield, in 1957. They had two sons and two daughters.

== Legal career ==
A lawyer by profession, Hardie Boys was a partner in his father's law firm; this became Scott Hardie Boys & Morrison. He was on the council of the Wellington District Court Law Society (1973–1979) before he became its president in 1979. He was on the council of the New Zealand Law Society (1976–1979). For the New Zealand Law Society, he served on the Legal Aid Board before appointed its chairman in 1978.

Hardie Boys became a judge of the High Court of New Zealand in 1980 (prior to 1980, the name was Supreme Court, i.e. he sat in the same court that his father had). In 1989, he was elevated to the Court of Appeal, and was appointed a Privy Counsellor. In 1994, he was elected as an Honorary Bencher at Gray's Inn, and in 1995 became an Honorary Fellow of Wolfson College, Cambridge. He was also a visiting fellow at Wolfson. In the 1996 New Year Honours, Hardie Boys was appointed a Knight Grand Cross of the Order of St Michael and St George.

== Governor-General ==
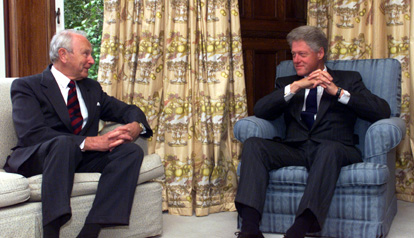
Hardie Boys (left) with United States President Bill Clinton, 1999

On 21 March 1996, Hardie Boys was appointed by Queen Elizabeth II, Queen of New Zealand on the advice of Prime Minister Jim Bolger, as the Governor-General of New Zealand. As the forthcoming 1996 general election would be the first mixed-member proportional representation (MMP) election, the appointment of a lawyer with an understanding of constitutional law was desirable. Bolger had notified all leaders of parties then represented in parliament, to ensure broad cross-party support. At subsequent appointments, other party leaders are only notified very shortly before the announcement is made, if at all.

In May 1996, shortly before the introduction of MMP, Hardie Boys announced that his role in the event of an unclear election outcome would be limited; he stated that he would not personally decide who led a government but would act on the advice of elected politicians.

In the 1996 Queen's Birthday Honours, Hardie Boys was the first person appointed a Knight Grand Companion of the New Zealand Order of Merit. He was also appointed a Knight of the Order of St John of Jerusalem in April 1996.

Controversy ensued in 1996 when he stated his opposition to Minister of Youth Affairs Deborah Morris's suggestion that young people have access to contraceptives. Later, in 2001, further controversy arose when he made an implied attack on the Clark Labour Government's scrapping of the air defence wing of the Royal New Zealand Air Force.

As governor-general, Hardie Boys had constitutional, ceremonial and community functions as per New Zealand's conventions. The constitutional duties involved summoning parliament at the beginning of each parliamentary session, delivering the prime minister's speech from the throne as part of these openings, (Note: The speech from the throne would be read by the monarch if in the country but during Hardie Boys' term, Elizabeth II did not visit; she had last been in New Zealand in November 1995 and next in February 2002.) the signing of bills that had been passed by parliament into law. Ceremonial duties included bestowing royal honours, and to prorogue parliament at the end of its term. Ceremonial duties included acting as patron for many of the country's societies.

Hardie Boys travelled extensively in the South Pacific, visiting Niue, Tokelau, and the Cook Islands – where he served as Governor-General – as well as Tonga, Samoa, Fiji, New Caledonia, and French Polynesia. His visits to New Caledonia and French Polynesia were the first by a New Zealand governor-general. Hardie Boys hosted United States President Bill Clinton during the 1999 APEC Summit in Auckland, and represented New Zealand at the 50th anniversary of NATO in Washington. He made a full state visit to China in November 2000.

Upon the completion of his term on 21 March 2001, Sir Michael and Lady Hardie Boys were both appointed additional Companions of the Queen's Service Order.

== Retirement and death ==
After his retirement as Governor-General of New Zealand, Hardie Boys served as a judge of the Kiribati Court of Appeal. He lived in retirement at Waikanae, where he helped out at Kapanui School's literacy programme.

In 2004, Hardie Boys stated his opposition to New Zealand becoming a republic, stating in an interview: "If it ain't broke, don't fix it."

Hardie Boys died in Waikanae on 29 December 2023, at the age of 92. His wife, Mary, Lady Hardie Boys, died on 26 June 2024, also at Waikanae.

== Arms ==
Coat of arms of Sir Michael Hardie Boys
Notes Michael Hardie Boys was granted armorial bearings with life supporters by the College of Arms on 8 February 2000, which consist of: Crest Perched on a Log fesswise a New Zealand bellbird proper holding in the beak an Anchor Or. Escutcheon Gules between two Pallets Argent a Cross formy convex Or on each limb a Mullet Gules on a Chief Or the Royal Crown between two full bottomed Wigs proper. Supporters On either side a North Island Weka proper. Motto Certus et Constans (Sure and Steadfast – in reference to the Boys' Brigade)

== Explanatory footnotes ==
Government offices
Preceded by Dame Catherine Tizard	Governor-General of New Zealand; 1996–2001	Succeeded by Dame Silvia Cartwright
