= Okere Falls Power Station =

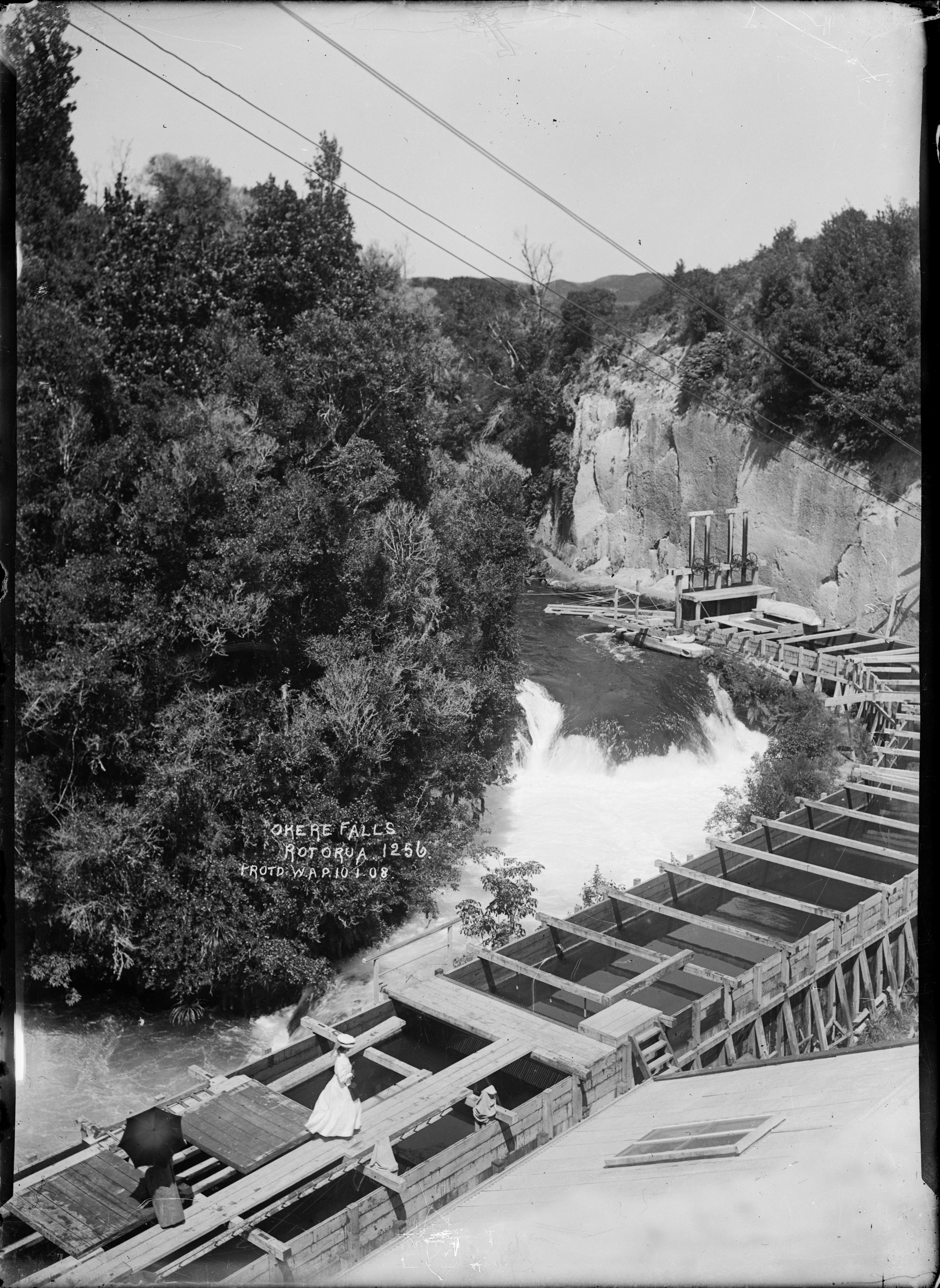
- Power station in 1908

- Location within New Zealand
- Country: New Zealand
- Coordinates: 38°0.86′S 176°20.73′E

Dam and spillways
- Impounds: Kaituna River

Power Station
- Commission date: 1901
- Decommission date: 1939
- Installed capacity: 200kW

Okere Falls Power Station is a hydroelectric power station that came into production in May 1901, bringing electricity to Rotorua. At the time, Rotorua was only the fourth town in New Zealand to have electricity. The power station was the first power station built by the New Zealand government, and it remained in operation until 1936.

== History ==
With Rotorua's expanding tourism industry in the 19th century, demand grew for having electrical lighting. In 1897, land was secured at Okere Falls for a powerhouse, followed by a tender in 1899 to build a hydro-electric power plant.

Rotorua's demand for electricity grew rapidly and by 1907 could not be met by the existing turbine anymore. In 1908, a new wing dam out from the head gates into the river was completed, bringing in enough water to run a second 100 kilowatts (130 hp) turbine, doubling the station's output to 200 kilowatts (270 hp). Each of the 'Waverley' horizontal turbines was connected by leather belts to two 50 kilowatts (67 hp) generators

Today, a viewing platform overlooking the Okere Falls waterfall also takes in the remains of the original dynamo house. In 1995, one of the old 100 kW turbines was retrieved from the riverbank through the same cutting that was originally used to lower it to the dynamo house. It is now on display at the start of the Okere Falls track.
