= Paraiti River =

- Route of the Paraiti River
- Mouth of the Paraiti River Paraiti River (North Island)

Location
- Country: New Zealand

Physical characteristics
- Source: Confluence of the Mangorewa River and Ohaupara Stream
  - coordinates: 37°57′37″S 176°10′18″E
- Mouth
  - location: Kaituna River
  - coordinates: 37°49′46″S 176°23′27″E

Basin features
- Progression: Paraiti River → Kaituna River → Bay of Plenty
- Tributaries
  - left: Ruru Stream, Kiwi Stream, Upokoongauru Stream, Otamamariri Stream
  - right: Pipikarihi Stream, Mangapouri Stream, Ruato Stream, Onaia Stream

The Paraiti River is a river of the Rotorua Lakes District and the Western Bay of Plenty District of New Zealand's North Island. It flows northeast from the confluence of the Mangorewa River and Ohaupara Stream, and flows into the Kaituna River.

== Geography ==
The upper section of the Paraiti River forms a section of the border between the Rotorua Lakes District and the Western Bay of Plenty District.

== History ==
The river is traditionally considered tapu by Te Arawa hapū of the area, as many urupa and burial caves are located alongside the river. The river was traditionally used for eel fishing. Two defensive pā are located in the upper section of the river, Te Pehu and Te Weta, both of which utilised limestone caves as a part of the defenses of the pā, and the pā Kaiwaka was located at the mouth of the Paraiti River at it reaches the Kaituna River.

Prior to the Tapuika Claims Settlement Act 2014, the name Paraiti River was used on some maps for both the Mangorewa River and lower Paraiti River.

From 2017, the Kōkako Ecosystem Expansion Programme has worked to improve outcomes for kōkako populations in the Paraiti River catchment, through pest management and land management. The Paraiti Catchment Care Group, established in 2020, is a group focused on restoring the natural environment of the river, and mitigating the impacts of farming and forestry on the river's catchment.

== See also ==
- List of rivers of New Zealand
