= Te Ranga =

- Interactive map of Te Ranga
- Coordinates: 37.905°S 176.273°E
- Country: New Zealand
- Region: Bay of Plenty
- Territorial authority: Western Bay of Plenty District
- Ward: Maketu-Te Puke Ward
- Established: pre-European
- Electorates: Rotorua; Waiariki (Māori)

Government
  - Territorial authority: Western Bay of Plenty District Council
  - Regional council: Bay of Plenty Regional Council
  - Mayor of Western Bay of Plenty: James Denyer
  - Rotorua MP: Todd McClay
  - Waiariki MP: Rawiri Waititi

Area
  - Total: 79.31 km^{2} (30.62 sq mi)
- Elevation: 27 m (89 ft)

Population (2023 Census)
  - Total: 312
  - Density: 3.93/km^{2} (10.2/sq mi)
- Time zone: UTC+12 (NZST)
  - Summer (DST): UTC+13 (NZDT)
- Postcode: 3188
- Area code: 07

Te Ranga is a settlement in the Western Bay of Plenty District and Bay of Plenty region of New Zealand's North Island.

It was a key site during the New Zealand Wars.

== Demographics ==
Te Ranga covers 79.31 km^{2} (30.62 sq mi). It is part of the Rangiuru statistical area.

Historical population
Year	Pop.	±% p.a.
2006	255	—
2013	261	+0.33%
2018	333	+4.99%
2023	309	−1.48%

Te Ranga had a population of 309 in the 2023 New Zealand census, a decrease of 24 people (−7.2%) since the 2018 census, and an increase of 48 people (18.4%) since the 2013 census. There were 153 males and 162 females in 108 dwellings. 1.9% of people identified as LGBTIQ+. There were 72 people (23.3%) aged under 15 years, 57 (18.4%) aged 15 to 29, 150 (48.5%) aged 30 to 64, and 33 (10.7%) aged 65 or older.

People could identify as more than one ethnicity. The results were 93.2% European (Pākehā); 18.4% Māori; 1.9% Pasifika; 1.9% Asian; 1.0% Middle Eastern, Latin American and African New Zealanders (MELAA); and 3.9% other, which includes people giving their ethnicity as "New Zealander". English was spoken by 100.0%, Māori by 1.0%, Samoan by 1.0%, and other languages by 5.8%. No language could be spoken by 1.0% (e.g. too young to talk). The percentage of people born overseas was 11.7, compared with 28.8% nationally.

Religious affiliations were 22.3% Christian, 1.0% Māori religious beliefs, and 1.0% other religions. People who answered that they had no religion were 70.9%, and 5.8% of people did not answer the census question.

Of those at least 15 years old, 42 (17.7%) people had a bachelor's or higher degree, 144 (60.8%) had a post-high school certificate or diploma, and 54 (22.8%) people exclusively held high school qualifications. 21 people (8.9%) earned over $100,000 compared to 12.1% nationally. The employment status of those at least 15 was 147 (62.0%) full-time, 42 (17.7%) part-time, and 6 (2.5%) unemployed.

== Education ==
Te Ranga School is a co-educational state primary school for Year 1 to 8 students, with a roll of 177 as of July 2026. The school opened in 1927.
