= Anne Rowse =

New Zealand dancer

Anne Elizabeth Rowse ONZM (born 15 August 1931) is a retired New Zealand dancer and was director of the New Zealand School of Dance for 25 years.

== Biography ==
Rowse was born on 15 August 1931, the daughter of Garnet William Rowse and Nancy May James. She trained in ballet in New Zealand and then travelled to England, arriving there in 1952. She danced with Festival Ballet, now the English National Ballet, in London from 1952 to 1960. From 1978 to April 1993, Rowse was director of the New Zealand School of Dance. Under the leadership of Rowse in 1982 the national training institute introduced a contemporary dance programme which included a change of name from the National School of Ballet.

In the 2001 Queen's Birthday Honours, Rowse was appointed an Officer of the New Zealand Order of Merit, for services to ballet and dance.

In 2013, Rowse co-edited an account of the history of The Royal New Zealand Ballet, titled The Royal New Zealand Ballet at 60.
