= Tapuika =

Māori iwi (tribe) in New Zealand

- Iwi (tribe) in Māoridom
- Rohe (region): Te Takapu o Tapuika
- Waka (canoe): Arawa
- Maunga (mountain): Rangiuru
- Awa (river): Kaituna River
- Population: 2,022
- Website: www.tapuika.iwi.nz

Tapuika is a Māori iwi of New Zealand. Their rohe (territory), "Te Takapu o Tapuika" (the belly of Tapuika) includes Te Puke and Rangiuru in the Bay of Plenty region.

== History ==
The iwi is descended from Tia and his son Tapuika, who travelled with Tama-te-kapua and Ngātoro-i-rangi on the Arawa canoe, which made landfall in New Zealand at Maketu in the Bay of Plenty. When other members of crew started staking claims to land, Tia declared the area from Maketu west to Wairakei stream in Papamoa, to be the belly of his son Tapuika. This is still the name of the rohe today. Later, Tapuika settled in this area. Tia then explored the area inland from this section of the coast, all the way to Lake Taupō and claimed parts of it for his descendants, although he was tricked out of Taupo itself by Ngātoro-i-rangi. Waitaha, the descendants of Tia's twin brother, Hei, settled the area immediately northwest of Tapuika.

When Te Rangihouhiri led the Ngāi Te Rangi invasion of Maketu, Tapuika fought alongside Waitaha, other iwi of Te Arawa, and forces from Waikato to retain the peninsula, but they were defeated at the Battle of Poporohuamea. Tapuika joined four subsequent attempts to drive Ngāi Te Rangi out of Maketu, led by the Ngāti Whakaue chiefs Taiwere, Moekaha, Te Ariariterangi, and Te Roro-o-te-rangi. The first three ended in major defeats; the last culminated in a peaceful settlement in which the loss of Maketu was conceded.

In the tenth generation after the arrival of the Arawa, the Tapuika chief Marukukere allowed a group from the east led by Nainai or Kahu to settle within the rohe in exchange for help during the harvest time. They ultimately chafed under this requirement and killed him, but this death was avenged by Moko at the Battle of Omaropoporo.

In the 1820s, Tapuika prospered as a result of the trade in flax and even bought their own ships which they used to sell flax and agricultural produce in Auckland and Sydney. However, their population was reduced as a result of the Musket Wars and influenza epidemics.

The tribe submitted a claim to the Waitangi Tribunal and entered into negotiations with the Crown, which culminated in the Tapuika Claims Settlement Act 2014.

== Hapū and marae ==
Marae of Tapuika.
1 Te Matai (Ngāti Kurī)
2 Te Paamu (Ngāti Marukukere)
3 Moko (Ngāti Moko)
4 Makahae (Ngāti Tuheke)
5 Tawakepito

There are four hapū within Tapuika, which are affiliated with five marae in Te Puke and Rangiuru:

Hapū	Marae	Wharenui	Address
Ngāti Kurī	Te Matai	Tapuika	49 McMeeking Road, Rangiuru
Ngāti Marukukere	Te Paamu	Tia	20 Malcolm Avenue, Rangiuru
Ngāti Moko	Moko	Mokotangatakotahi	314 SH2, Waitangi Te Puke
Ngāti Tuheke	Makahae (Te Kahika)	Makahae	20 Te Kahika Road West, Te Puke
Ngāti Tuheke	Tawakepito	Tawakepito	16 Te Kahika Road West, Te Puke

== Governance ==
The Tapuika Iwi Authority Trust is the post-treaty settlement governance entity under the Tapuika Claims Settlement Act 2014. In this context, it is responsible for managing the assets that it received in the settlement for Tapuika and represents Taupuika on the Te Maru o Kaituna River Authority. Tapuika Oranga Ake Trust represents the iwi as a mandated iwi organisation under the Māori Fisheries Act 2004 and as an Iwi Aquaculture Organisation under the Māori Commercial Aquaculture Claims Settlement Act 2004. It is run in parallel with Tapuika Iwi Authority Trust (i.e. the two organisations have identical boards). A subsidiary, Tapuika Holdings Limited, manages the iwi's fishing quota and share of the income from Moana Pacific (Aotearoa Fisheries Ltd). Tapuika Iwi Authority Trust also serves as the iwi authority for Tapuika under the Resource Management Act 1991, through a subsidiary, the Tapuika Resource Management Unit.

The board has eleven members, two for each of the hapū of Tapuika and three "taurahere" representatives for members of Tapuika outside the rohe. The chair of board, as of 2026, is Henare Hori Ahomiro. The board reports to all members of Tapuika at an annual general meeting.

A Kaunihera Koehe ("Council of Elders") advise the iwi on all matters relating to culture, language, genealogy, history, and traditions.

== Notable people ==
- Tia, early Māori explorer
- Moko, tribal leader
- Bill Gray, All Black 1955–1957
- Nehe Milner-Skudder, All Black 2015-2018

== See also ==
- List of Māori iwi

== Bibliography ==
- Locke, Samuel (1882). "Historical Traditions of Taupo and East Coast Tribes". Transactions and Proceedings of the Royal Society of New Zealand. 15: 433–459.
- Stafford, Don (1967). Te Arawa: A History of the Arawa People. Reed. ISBN 9780947506100.
