= Phil Broadhurst =

New Zealand composer (1949–2020)

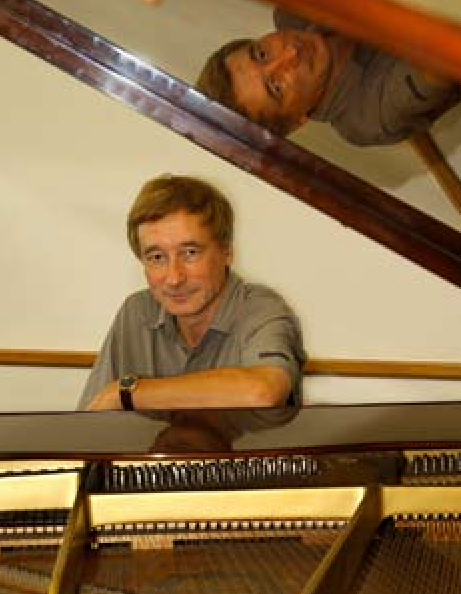
Broadhurst in 2008

Philip Douglas Broadhurst MNZM (26 June 1949 – 24 April 2020) was a New Zealand composer, jazz pianist, music lecturer and radio presenter.

== Education ==
Broadhurst has a master's degree from Massey University, completed in 2007. His thesis examined the music of French jazz pianist Michel Petrucciani.

== Career ==
Broadhurst hosted the Art of Jazz programme on Radio New Zealand for more than 20 years.

From 2000 until 2016, Broadhurst was Head of Jazz Studies at the New Zealand School of Music at Massey University's Albany campus in Auckland.

The 2011 album Delayed Reaction was a tribute to Michel Petrucciani and was reviewed favourably in the JazzTimes.

== Honours and awards ==
In the 2001 Queen's Birthday Honours, Broadhurst was appointed a Member of the New Zealand Order of Merit, for service to jazz music.

At the NZ Music Awards in 2016, Broadhurst won Jazz Tui for the third album Panacea from his Dedication trilogy.

== Personal life ==
Broadhurst lived in Auckland with his wife Julie Mason. He died on 24 April 2020, aged 70.

== Discography ==
- Sustenance, 1982
- Iris, 1985
- Sustenance 3, 1987
- Live at The London Bar, 1993
- Delayed Reaction, 2011
- Flaubert’s Dance, 2013
- Panacea, 2015

== See also ==
- Nathan Haines
