= Stanley Palmer (artist) =

New Zealand artist

Stanley Arthur Palmer ONZM (born 1936) is a New Zealand painter and printmaker.

== Biography ==
Palmer was born near Thames in the Coromandel, New Zealand and studied at Dunedin Technical College and Dunedin Teachers' Training College in the late 1950s. Although he has become well known for his prints, his formative years were spent painting. In 1969 he was awarded a Queen Elizabeth II Art Council grant and in 1970 he quit his day job as an art teacher to become a professional printmaker and painter. Palmer lives in Mount Eden, Auckland.

By the late 1970s his printmaking repertoire included woodcuts, monoprints and bamboo engravings. The scenes he portrays mainly feature New Zealand coasts with themes of colonisation, conservation, humanity and the land.

Palmer has had regular and numerous one-man exhibitions at leading galleries in Auckland, Wellington, Christchurch and Dunedin.

His work is represented in the national art collection housed in the Museum of New Zealand Te Papa Tongarewa and also in most other New Zealand public collections including the Marlborough District Council, Auckland Art Gallery and the Christchurch Art Gallery.

In the 2001 Queen's Birthday Honours, Palmer was appointed an Officer of the New Zealand Order of Merit, for services to fine art.

Palmer is the author of several books including East which includes 136 of his works including paintings, woodcuts, bamboo engravings and monoprints and To The Harbour which includes monoprints based on his childhood memories of the Manukau Harbour.

Palmer travelled to Gallipoli in 2014 and created a number of artworks which were exhibited at Blenheim's Millennium Public Art Gallery in 2016 in an exhibition called 'Shall Be My Brother: Gallipoli Remembered'.

Stanley Palmer was surprised to find out that he was named as a donor to the Labour party in 2017 as a result of a donation behind an "over-inflated" art auction. Stanley Palmer said "he was unaware he had been listed as a big party donor, but wasn't concerned by the disclosure".
