= Reginald Hardie Boys =

New Zealand lawyer and judge (1903–1970)

The Honourable Reginald Hardie Boys QC
- Born: 8 June 1903; Otautau, New Zealand
- Died: 6 December 1970 (aged 67); Auckland, New Zealand
- Occupations: Lawyer; judge
- Spouse: Edith May Bennett (m. 1929)
- Children: 2
- Relatives: Michael Hardie Boys (son)

Reginald Hardie Boys QC (8 June 1903 – 6 December 1970) was a New Zealand lawyer and judge. He was appointed Queen's Counsel and a judge of the Supreme Court (now High Court) in 1958.

== Early life and family ==
Hardie Boys was born in Otautau on 8 June 1903, the son of Frederick William Boys, a Primitive Methodist clergyman, and Hannah Jane Boys (née Hardie). His surname at birth was Boys, but he later used his middle name (his mother's maiden name) as part of his surname, sometimes written Hardie-Boys. He was educated at Palmerston North Boys' High School.

On 2 October 1929, Hardie Boys married Edith May Bennett at St Paul's Methodist Church in Palmerston North, and the couple went on to have two sons, including Michael Hardie Boys.

== Career ==
Hardie Boys became a barrister and solicitor in 1924, practising in Wellington. Over the following 33 years, he worked either on his own account, or as a senior partner in his own law firm conducted under various firm names including: Hardie Boys and Fortune; Hardie Boys, Haldane, and Fortune; Hardie Boys and Haldane; and Scott, Hardie Boys and Morrison. The majority of his legal practice was in the courts, particularly in the Supreme Court and Court of Appeal in later years. In 1948, he was counsel for the Crown before the parliamentary inquiry into the film industry, and in 1954 he was appointed counsel to assist the board of inquiry that investigated the Tangiwai railway disaster.

On 4 March 1958, Hardie Boys was appointed Queen's Counsel, and in July that year he was appointed a judge of the Supreme Court, to be based in Auckland. In October 1968, he was appointed an additional judge for the Court of Appeal.

Hardie Boys served the legal profession as a council member of both the Wellington District Law Society and the New Zealand Law Society, and was president of the Wellington District Law Society in 1954.

== Military service ==
During the later years of World War II, Hardie Boys served in the Pacific as part of N Force, having been commissioned as a second lieutenant (temporary) in the Wellington Regiment (City of Wellington's Own) on 3 April 1942.

Hardie Boys later served as president of the Wellington branch of the Returned Services' Association (RSA), and was also a member of the national executive committee of the RSA.

== Death and legacy ==
Hardie Boys died in Auckland on 6 December 1970, at the age of 67. His obituary in The Press newspaper described him as "one of New Zealand's foremost legal figures". His wife, Edith May Hardie Boys, died in 1985. Their son, Michael, became a judge of the High Court in 1980, a judge of the Court of Appeal and privy counsellor in 1989, and served as New Zealand's 17th governor-general, from 1996 to 2001.
