= 2001 Birthday Honours (New Zealand) =

Awards list for New Zealand

2001 Queen's Birthday Honours
- Previous: 2001 Special Honours; Next: 2002 New Year Honours
- Type: New Zealand royal honours: New Zealand Order of Merit; Queen's Service Order; Queen's Service Medal
- Date: 4 June 2001
- Country: New Zealand

Highlights
- Total recipients: 184

The 2001 Queen's Birthday Honours in New Zealand, celebrating the official birthday of Queen Elizabeth II, were appointments made by the Queen in her right as Queen of New Zealand, on the advice of the New Zealand government, to various orders and honours to reward and highlight good works by New Zealanders. They were announced on 4 June 2001.

The recipients of honours are listed here as they were styled before their new honour.

== New Zealand Order of Merit ==
=== Distinguished Companion (DCNZM) ===
- Patricia Mary Harrison QSO – of Dunedin North. For services to education and the community.
- The Right Honourable John Steele Henry QC – of Auckland. For services as a judge of the Court of Appeal.
- Dr David Henry Lewis – of Waitakere (West Auckland). For services to yachting and exploration.
- Sister Pauline Margaret O'Regan CBE – of Christchurch. For services to education and the community.
- Dr Ranginui Joseph Isaac Walker – of Auckland. For services to Māori.

=== Companion (CNZM) ===
- The Most Reverend Denis George Browne – of Hamilton. For services to the community.
- Judy Coralyn Sylvia Callingham – of Auckland. For services to drama.
- Dr Shirley Joan Chapple – of Auckland. For services to medicine and the community.
- Emeritus Professor John Dunmore JP – of Auckland. For services to literature and historical research.
- Audrey Lily Eagle – of Dunedin. For services to botanical art.
- Emeritus Professor Sir Raymond William Firth – of London, United Kingdom. For services to anthropology.
- Margaret Mary Hutchison – of Wellington. For services to women and the community.
- Norman William Kingsbury JP – of Hamilton. For services to education.
- Emeritus Professor George Alexander Knox MBE – of Christchurch. For services to ecology and biological science.
- Gary Albert Paykel – of Auckland. For services to manufacturing and the community.
- Dr Merimeri Penfold – of Te Atatū South. For services to Māori.
- Hapimana Toby Rikihana – of Christchurch. For services to education.
- Emeritus Professor William Edward Willmott – of Christchurch. For services to New Zealand–China relations.
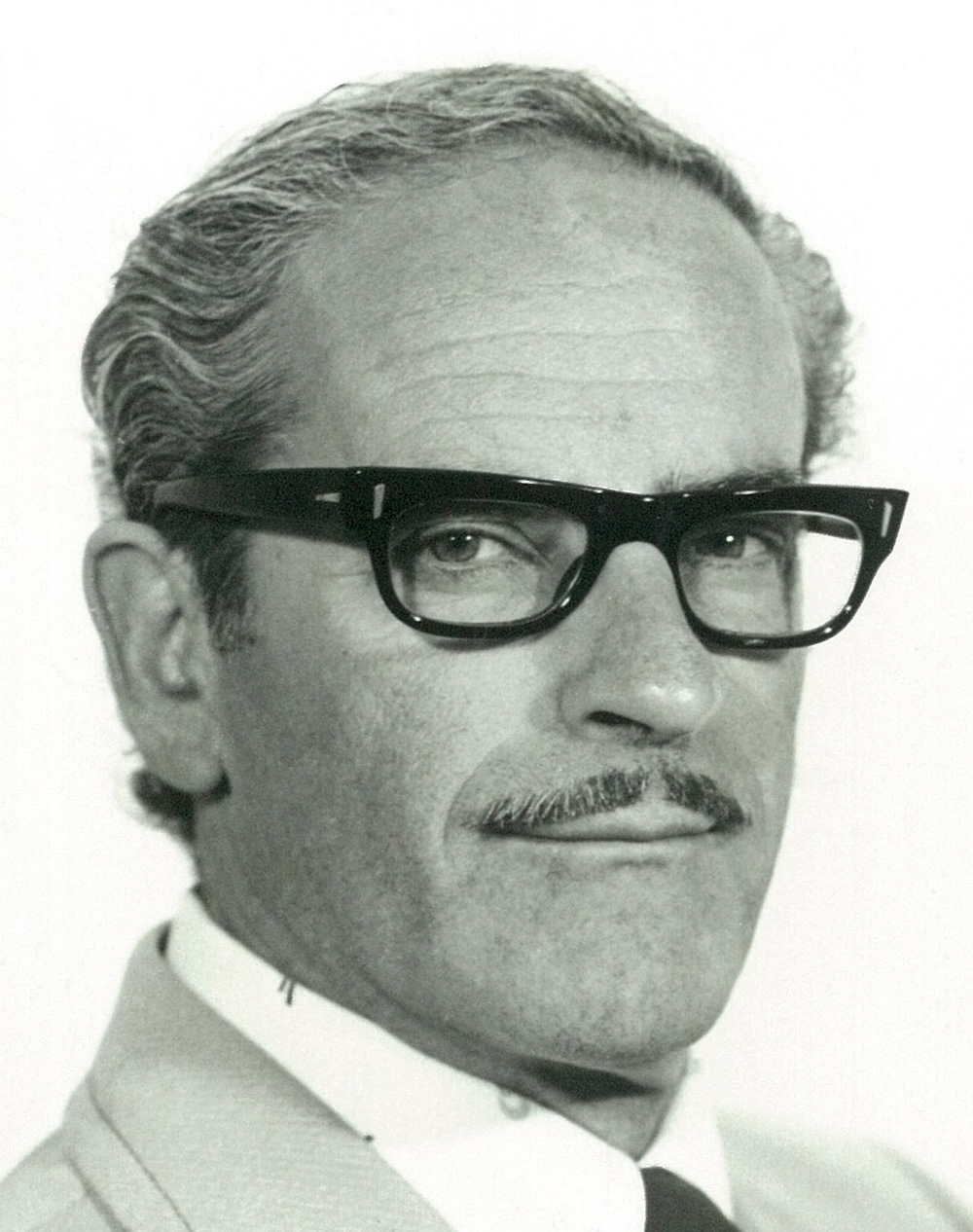
John Dunmore

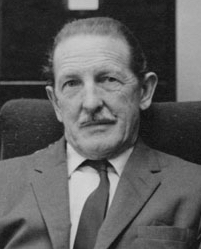
Sir Raymond Firth

=== Officer (ONZM) ===
- Dr David Maxwell O'Neill Becroft – of Auckland. For services to medicine.
- William David Benjamin JP – of Westport. For services to local-body and community affairs.
- Peter Wilson Boag – of Wellington. For public and community services.
- Michael Shane Campbell – of Tītahi Bay. For services to golf.
- Warrant Officer Class One Hohaia Charles Collier – of Paraparaumu; Royal New Zealand Infantry Regiment.
- Dr Karen Mary Cooper – of Hastings. For services to science.
- Dr Lawrence James Croxson – of Tūrangi. For services to dental health.
- Michael Patrick Doolan – of Christchurch, currently in Hampshire, United Kingdom. For services to social welfare.
- Robert Leslie Field – of Feilding. For services to the motor industry.
- Paul Fitzharris – of Waitati; lately Assistant Commissioner of Police, New Zealand Police.
- Dr Brian Edgar Goulden – of Palmerston North. For services to the equine industry.
- Eleanor Ann Hawthorn – of Pukekohe. For services to pharmacy and the community.
- Elizabeth Hawthorne – of Auckland. For services to the theatre.
- Robyn Mary Hunt JP – of Wellington. For services to people with disabilities.
- Dr Austin Vernon Mitchell – of London, United Kingdom. For services to New Zealand interests in the United Kingdom.
- Stanley Arthur Palmer – of Auckland. For services to fine art.
- Commodore Alan John Peck – of Lower Hutt; Royal New Zealand Navy.
- Ann Robinson – of Auckland. For services to glass art.
- Elizabeth Anne Rowse – of Wellington. For services to ballet and dance.
- Catherine Rosaleen Saunders – of Auckland. For services to broadcasting and the community.
- Peter Charles Sinclair – of Auckland. For services to broadcasting.
- Ralph Allan Stockdill – of Wellington. For services to employment relations.
- John Douglas Storey – of Te Awamutu. For services to the dairy industry.
- Duncan Wishart Taylor JP – of Waiareka, Oamaru. For services to local government.
- Michael Anthony Walsh – of Lower Hutt. For services to softball.
- Susan Accushla Wilson – of Wellington. For services to the theatre.

Additional

- Colonel Martin John Angus Dransfield – Colonels' List, New Zealand Army.
- Wing Commander Russell Graeme Pirihi MVO – Royal New Zealand Air Force.
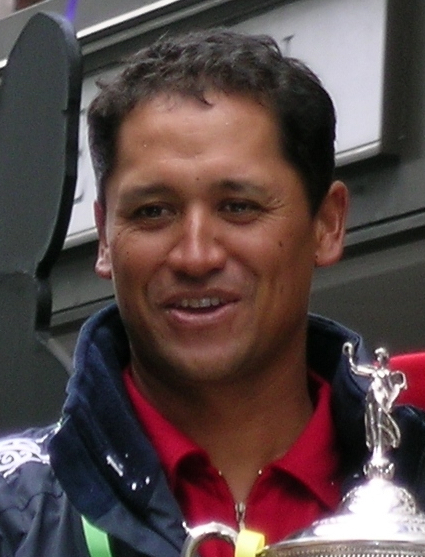
Michael Campbell

Robyn Hunt

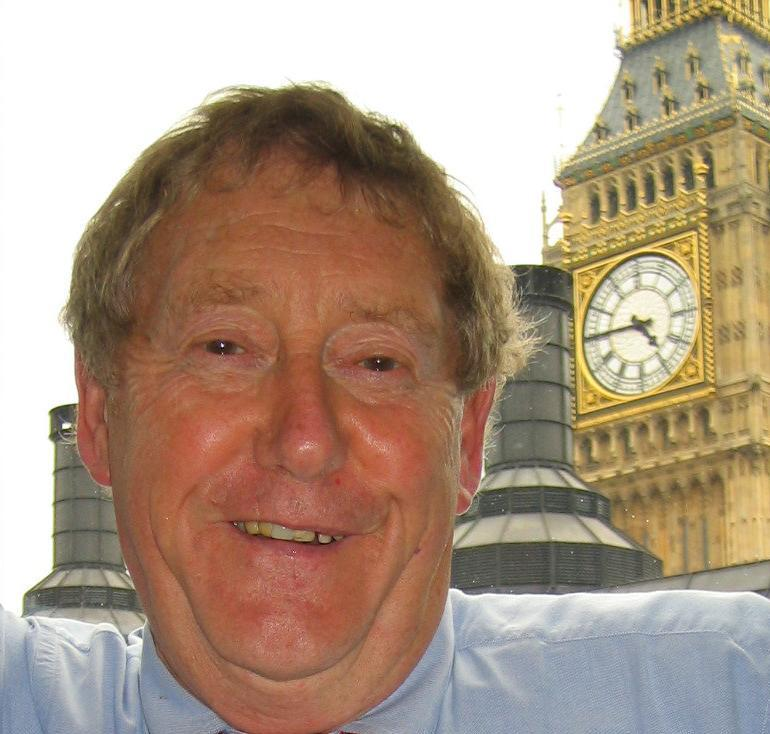
Austin Mitchell

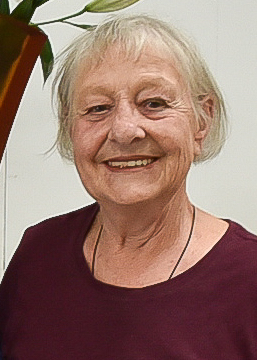
Ann Robinson

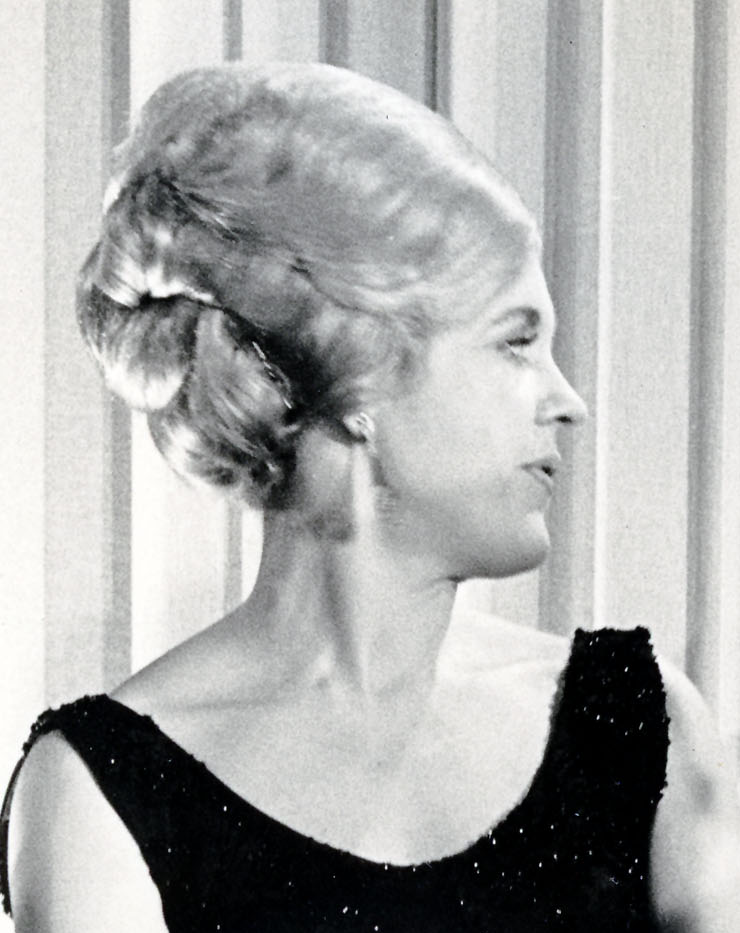
Catherine Saunders

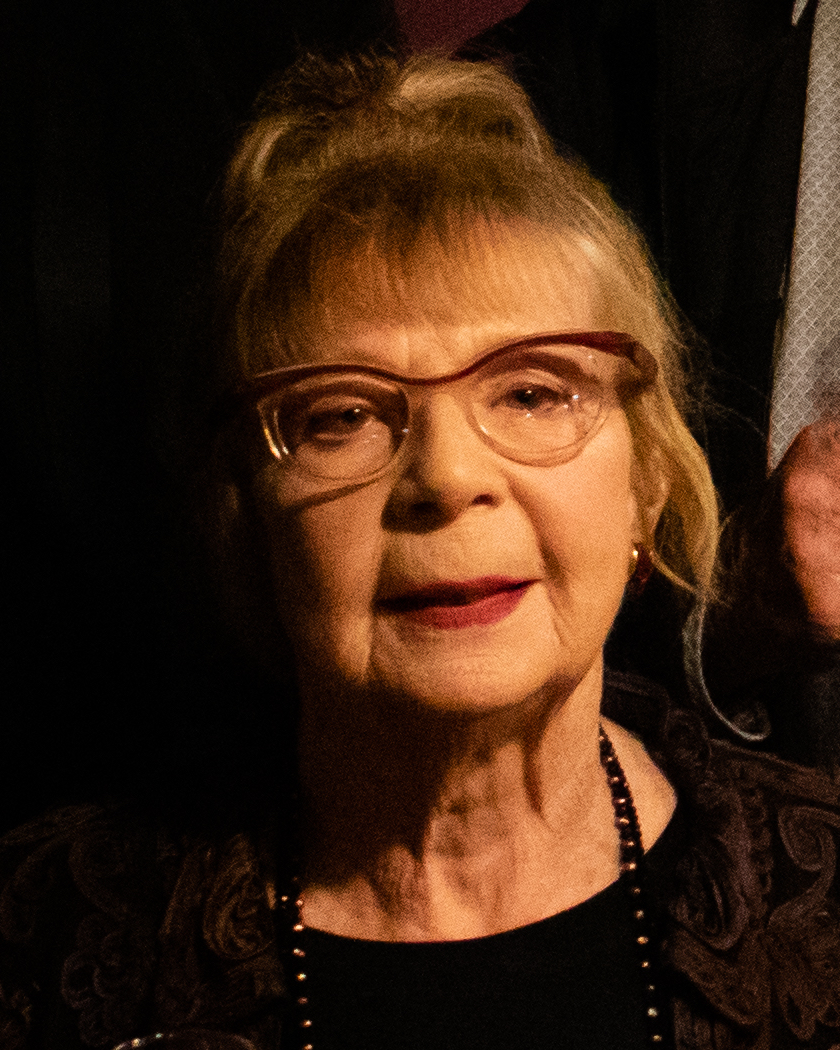
Susan Wilson

=== Member (MNZM) ===
- Maureen Rose Aitken – of Plimmerton. For services to the community.
- Kerry Ayling Ashby – of Manukau City. For services to rowing.
- William David Baillie – of Auckland. For services to athletics.
- Richard Peter Bentley – of Manukau City. For services to the community.
- Dr Katharine Helen Campbell Bowden – of Tutukaka. For services to public health and the community.
- Philip Douglas Broadhurst – of Auckland. For services to jazz music.
- Graham Read Burgess – of Auckland. For services to cricket.
- Kenneth Soo Keung Chan JP – of Wellington. For services to the Chinese community.
- Wilma Coppins – of Auckland. For services to the community.
- Jesse Maisey Crutchley – of Ranfurly. For services to farming, local bodies and the community.
- Patrick John Davidsen – of Nelson; chief fire officer, Stoke Volunteer Fire Brigade. For services to the New Zealand Fire Service and the community.
- Yvonne Dufaur – of Auckland. For services to volunteer management.
- Carroll Elizabeth Finlayson JP – of Pōkeno. For services to the community.
- Trevor Richard Duncan Flint – of Christchurch. For services to table tennis.
- Warrant Officer Seaman Reece Stuart Golding – Royal New Zealand Navy.
- Dr Ross Clifton Gordon – of Stratford. For services to the community.
- Mary Frances Haughey – of Christchurch. For services to the community.
- Warrant Officer Marine Technician (Propulsion) James Donald Hayes – Royal New Zealand Navy (Retired).
- Murray John Henshall – of Auckland. For services to mental health.
- Galumalemana Alfred Hunkin – of Tawa. For services to the Pacific Islands community.
- Cecil Henry Irwin JP – of Dunedin. For services to education.
- Bruce George Kilmister – of Auckland. For services to the community.
- Terrence Edward King JP – of Invercargill. For services to the community.
- Jadwiga Lendnal – of Wellington. For services to the Polish community.
- Andrew Roy Leslie JP – of Petone. For services to rugby.
- Daniel Samuel Lewis JP – formerly of Wellington and now of Caulfield, Victoria, Australia. For services to the community.
- Graham James Lindsay JP – of Blenheim. For services to economic development.
- Suzanne Joy Lynch – of Auckland. For services to entertainment.
- Edith Jessie McGimpsey – of Waimate. For services to the community.
- Doris Elizabeth Mehrtens – of Hokitika. For services to the community.
- Cynthia Ann Mills JP – of Porirua. For services to the community.
- Elizabeth (Liz) Ceiridwen Moore (Mrs Lambert) – of Auckland. For services to education.
- James Moriarty – of Wellington. For services to drama.
- Shirley Erena Murray – of Raumati Beach. For services as a hymn writer.
- Cyril Te Hiringanuku Ngamane – of Thames. For services to the community.
- Associate Professor Angela Rosalind Creighton Pack – of Dunedin. For services to dentistry.
- Diana Rae Parsons – of Christchurch. For services to music and the community.
- Linda Pearson – of Auckland. For services to community health.
- John Charles Perriam – of Cromwell. For services to the wool industry.
- Edith Rae – of Whakatāne. For services to the community.
- Karl Robinson – of Auckland. For services to welfare work.
- Patrick Bernard Robinson JP – of Rawene. For services to local government and the community.
- John Leonard Schwabe – of Palmerston North. For services to music.
- Henry John Stace ED – of Picton. For services to marine heritage and local-body affairs.
- Alan Reynal Stevens – of Lower Hutt. For services to athletics.
- Maureen Te Rangi Rere I Waho Waaka – of Rotorua. For services to tourism and the community.
- Dr John Warham – of Christchurch. For services to ornithology.
- Apo Henarata Te Huia Wawatai – of Tikitiki. For services to the community.
- Judith Williams – of Wellington. For services to the New Zealand Portrait Gallery.
- Arthur James Wright – of Ohinewai. For services to horse trials.

Additional

- Corporal Mark Anderson – Corps of Royal New Zealand Military Police.
- Major Andrew Carson Dunn – Royal New Zealand Army Medical Corps.
- Staff Sergeant Alan Bruce Marriott – Corps of Royal New Zealand Engineers.
- Flight Sergeant Peter Alexander Wilson – Royal New Zealand Air Force.
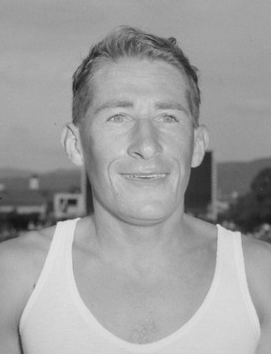
Bill Baillie

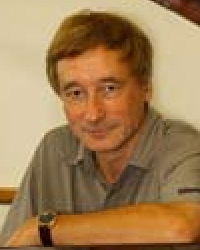
Phil Broadhurst

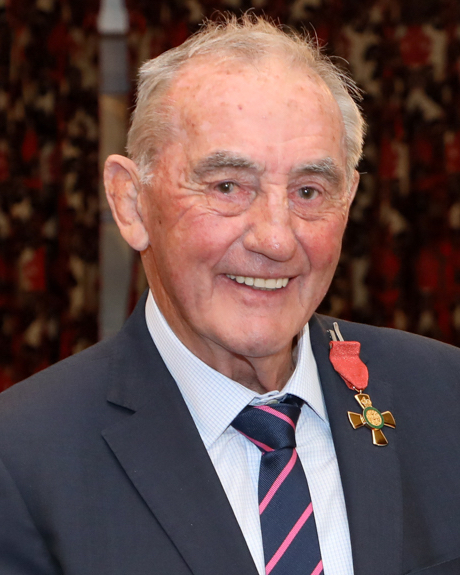
Andy Leslie

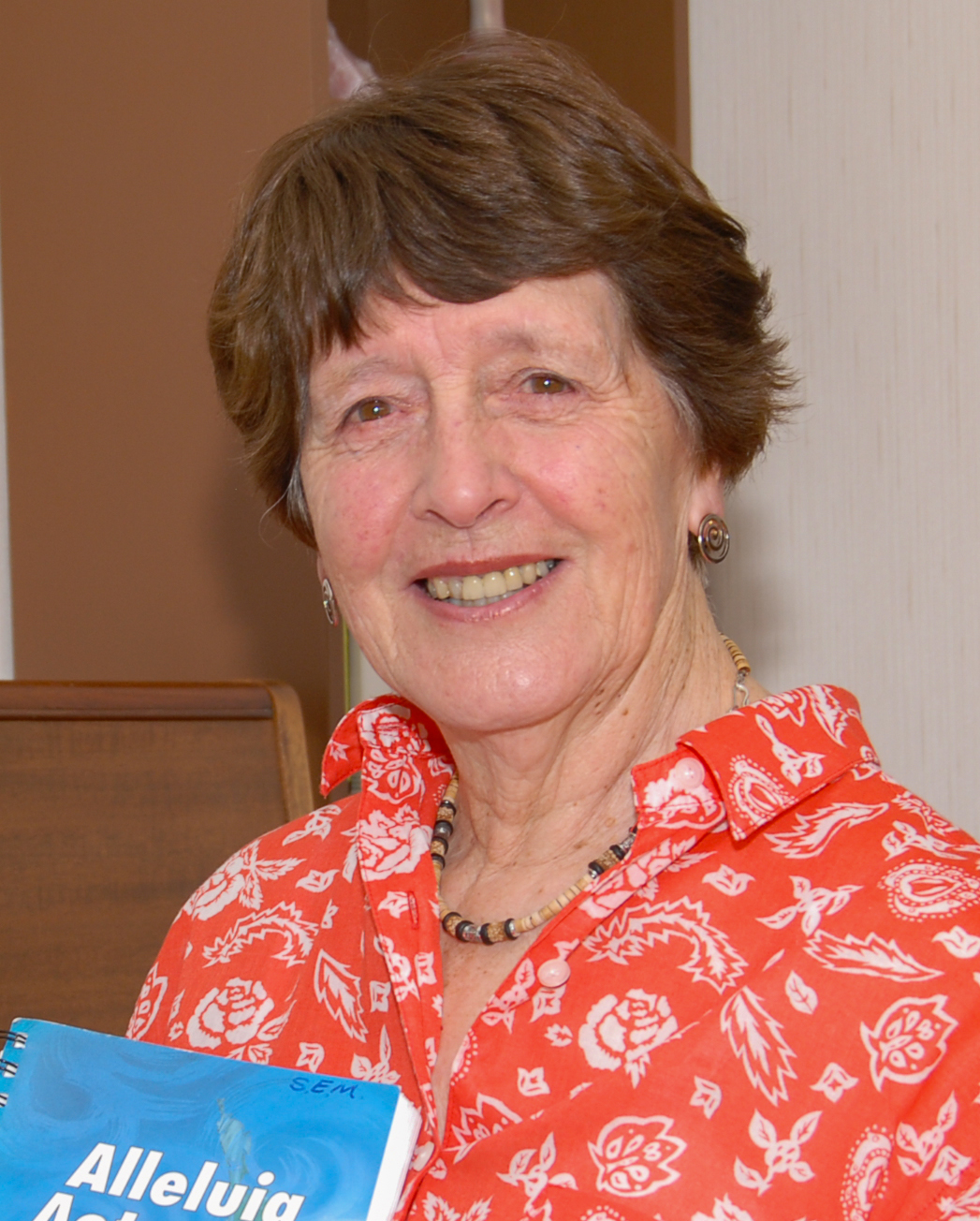
Shirley Murray

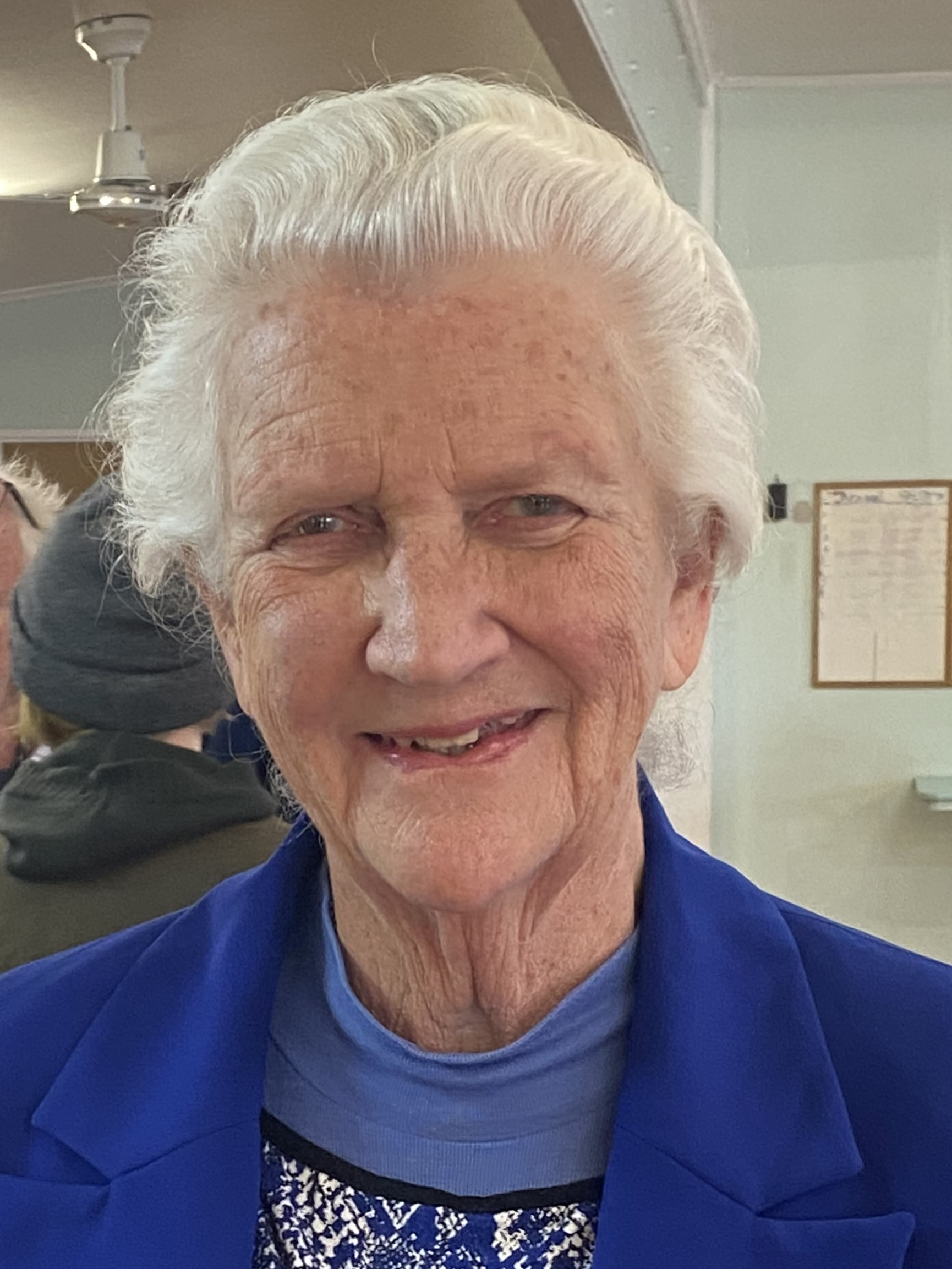
Angela Pack

== Companion of the Queen's Service Order (QSO) ==
=== For community service ===
- Foster John Husband – of Taramea Bay, Riverton.
- Dorothy May McCaw – of Milton.
- The Reverend John Alexander Marsden – of Auckland.
- Merle Elizabeth Newlove – of Dargaville.
- Pauline Eunice Tangiora QSM JP – of Mahia.
- Jeanette Kathleen Tarbotton – of Ashburton.
- John Elliott Watson – of Wellington.
- Judith Ann Wilson – of Manukau City.

=== For public services ===
- Ross Leslie Allen JP – of New Plymouth.
- Frana Grace Cardno JP – of Te Anau.
- Anthony Paul Holman – of Auckland.
- Nita Vilna Hornbrook JP – of Nelson, New Zealand.
- Leo Francis McKendry – of Blenheim.
- Mollie Ngan-Kee JP – of Lower Hutt.
- Olwen Grace Mary Norton – of Timaru.
- Susan Ann Urquhart – of Wellington.
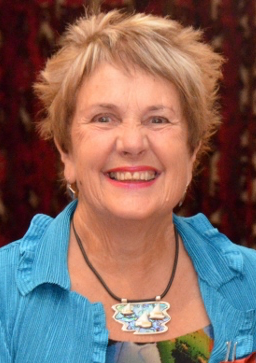
Frana Cardno

== Queen's Service Medal (QSM) ==
=== For community service ===
- Leslie Walter Carrick – of Dunedin.
- Mary Nancye Christina Carrick – of Dunedin.
- Raymond Colin Clayton – of Rotorua.
- Johnny Tahu Cooper – of Lower Hutt.
- Nina Jackalyn Crawford – of Waiuku.
- Gillian Patricia Davies – of Wellington.
- Lois Annis Duncan – of Wellington.
- Patricia Mary Fowle – of Waihi.
- Judith Ann Fowler – of Auckland.
- David Langton Gallop – of Christchurch.
- Jack Douglas Gillespie – of Christchurch.
- Frank Barton Greenem – of Palmerston North.
- Leonie Elizabeth Gunning – of Auckland.
- Shirley Jean Hyland – of Gisborne.
- Teata Inakura – of Kumeū.
- Brian John Kennedy – of Auckland.
- James Robert Lynch – of Wellington.
- Raymond Maurice McConchie – of Nelson.
- Andrew James McKenzie – of Carterton.
- William McKenzie – of North Shore City.
- Mary Susanne (Honey) Martin JP – of Taupō.
- James John Oliver Mitchell JP – of Manukau City.
- Vera Lily Kate Mummery – of Auckland.
- Shirley Ivy May Pearpoint – of Feilding.
- Margaret Effie Roberts (Margot Lloyd) – of North Shore City.
- Ina Jean Rountree – of Manukau City.
- Kenneth Gordon Sager – of Putāruru.
- Merle Napper Sheehan – of Rangiora.
- Tapaeru Skinnon – of Wellington.
- Colin Woulds Smith – of Hamilton.
- Betty Stone – of Greymouth.
- Desmond Brian Waite – of Auckland.
- Heather Anne Walker – of Wairoa.
- Verna Lenice Warner JP – of Taumarunui.
- Tutarangi Wichman – of Havelock North.
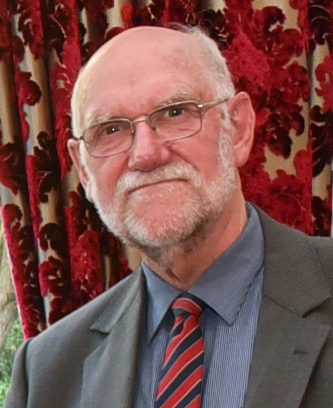
Jim Lynch

=== For public services ===
- Ashley George Bell – of Levin.
- Graham John Bell – of Rotorua; detective inspector, New Zealand Police.
- John Patrick Cyril Blumsky – of Waikuku Beach.
- Alexander Maurice Clarke – of Wainuiomata.
- Trevor Vincent Collings – of Papakura.
- Beryl Joy Doyle JP – of Paraparaumu Beach.
- John Douglas Walter Gadsby JP – of Hastings; fire force commander, Hastings District Council Rural Fire Authority.
- Pamela Maureen Garbes – of Kaikōura.
- (Doreen) Ruth Hammond JP – of Lower Hutt.
- John William Hull JP – of Pukekohe.
- Pamela Jamieson – of Huntly.
- Gordon David Kirk – of Christchurch.
- Frank William Leadley – of Opua.
- William Charles Nicholl MacLean – of Johnsonville; lately station commander, Johnsonville Volunteer Fire Brigade, New Zealand Fire Service.
- Norman Charles McIntosh – of Hamilton; senior constable, New Zealand Police.
- Keith Leslie McKenzie – of Taumarunui.
- Davida Morehu Mita – of Palmerston North.
- Dawne Muriel Morton – of Wanganui.
- Warren Keith Oliver – of Grey Valley; volunteer fireman, Ikamatua Volunteer Fire Brigade, New Zealand Fire Service.
- Alexander Bruce Ott – of Governors Bay.
- Wayne Ingoa Panapa – of Hamilton; senior constable, New Zealand Police.
- David Harold Parker JP – of Warkworth.
- Judith Ngaire Maud Pickard – of Hamilton.
- Nicholas John Pupich – of Blackball; senior station officer, Ikamatua Volunteer Fire Brigade, New Zealand Fire Service.
- Alison Marie Quigan – of Palmerston North.
- Ralph Ian Rayner – of Clareville.
- Lance Andrew Rollo – of Wainuiomata; constable, New Zealand Police.
- Yvonne Gladys Saville – of Christchurch.
- Manu Robert Alan Tawhai – of Wellington.
- Jack Trevor Van Dyk JP – of Auckland.
- Michael Paul Walsh – of North Shore City; constable, New Zealand Police.
- Cyril Whitaker – of Havelock North.
- Francis William Woodward – of Hamilton.
