= 2001 Special Honours (New Zealand) =

Awards list for New Zealand

- Previous: 2001 New Year Honours; Next: 2001 Queen's Birthday Honours
- Type: New Zealand royal honours: New Zealand Order of Merit; Queen's Service Order
- Date: 20 March 2001; 21 March 2001
- Country: New Zealand

Highlights
- Total recipients: 3

The 2001 Special Honours in New Zealand were two Special Honours Lists, published in New Zealand on 20 and 21 March 2001. Appointments were made to the New Zealand Order of Merit and the Queen's Service Order to recognise the incoming governor-general, Dame Silvia Cartwright, and the outgoing governor general and viceregal consort, Sir Michael and Lady Hardie Boys.

== New Zealand Order of Merit ==
=== Principal Companion (PCNZM) ===
Additional

- The Honourable Dame Silvia Rose Cartwright DBE – Governor-General Designate
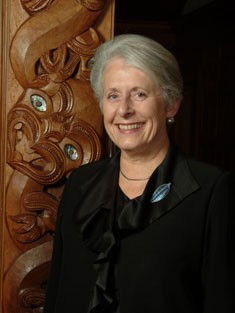
Dame Silvia Cartwright

== Companion of the Queen's Service Order (QSO) ==
Additional, for community service

- (Edith) Mary, Lady Hardie Boys

Additional, for public services

- The Right Honourable Sir Michael Hardie Boys GNZM GCMG – Principal Companion of the Queen's Service Order and Governor-General and Commander-in-Chief in and over New Zealand since 1996
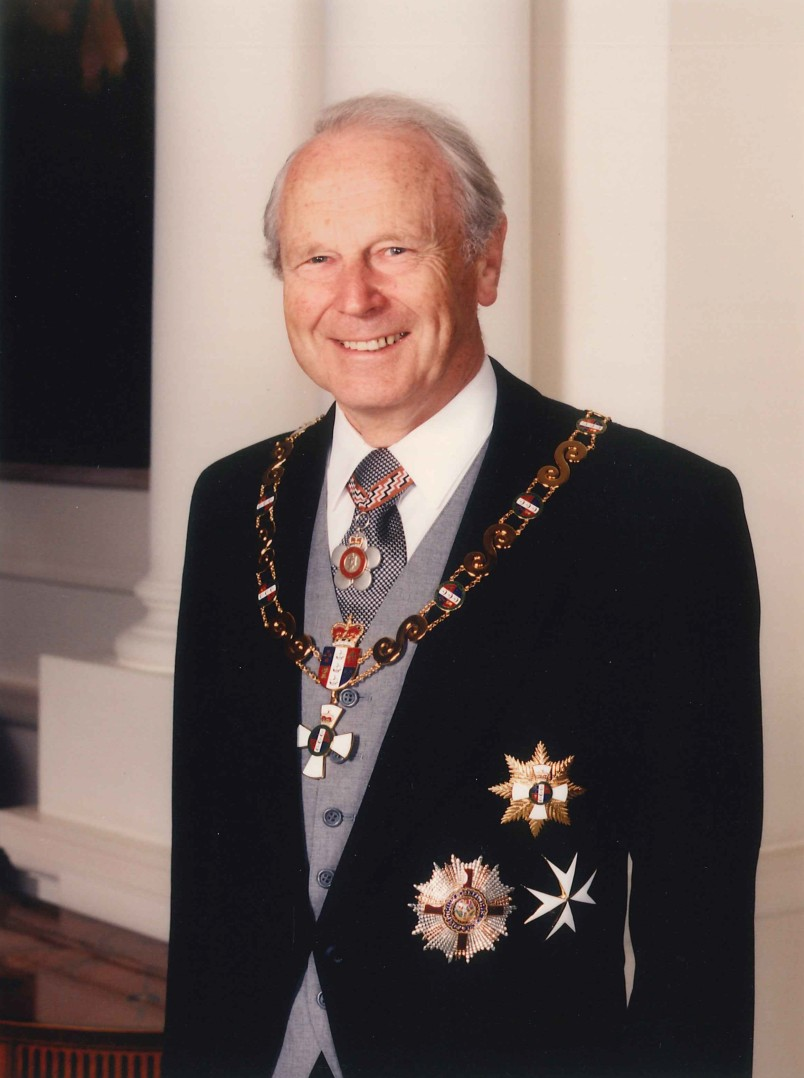
Sir Michael Hardie Boys
