= Kaituna River =

River in New Zealand

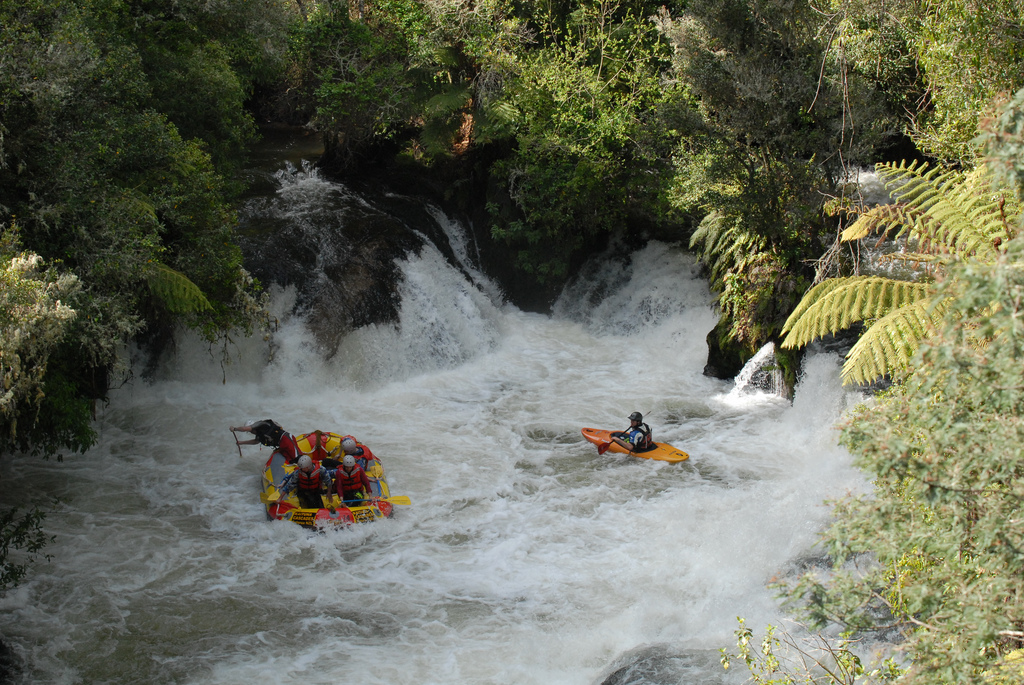
- Rafting on the Kaituna River
- Route of the Kaituna River
- Mouth of the Kaituna River Kaituna River (North Island)

Location
- Country: New Zealand

Physical characteristics
- Source: Lake Rotoiti
  - location: Ōkere Inlet
  - coordinates: 38°01′03″S 176°20′41″E
- Mouth
  - location: Bay of Plenty
  - coordinates: 37°44′54″S 176°24′54″E
- Length: 53 km (33 mi) (approx)
- Discharge
  - average: 36 m^{3}/s (1,300 cu ft/s)

Basin features
- Progression: Kaituna River → Bay of Plenty → Pacific Ocean
- Tributaries
  - left: Hururu Stream, Paraiti River, Pakipaki Stream, Parawhenuamea Stream, Waiari Stream, Raparapahoe Canal, Kopuaroa Canal
  - right: Onepu Stream
- Waterfalls: Okere Falls, Tutea Falls, Trout Pool Falls, Kaituna Falls
- Bridges: Okere Bridge, Kaituna River Bridge

The Kaituna River is in the Bay of Plenty region of the North Island of New Zealand. It is the outflow from Lakes Rotorua and Rotoiti, and flows northwards for 45 kilometres (28 mi), emptying into the Bay of Plenty at Maketu. It was the subject of a claim concerning the effluent flowing down the river from Lake Rotorua, which resulted in movement to a land treatment system.

The New Zealand Ministry for Culture and Heritage gives a translation of "eat eels" for Kaituna.

The upper section of the Kaituna, also referred to as Okere River, offers some of the best whitewater kayaking and rafting in the world, with the Okere Falls area containing the highest commercially rafted waterfall, 7 metres (23 ft), in the world. It is also famous for its trout fishing.

== Geography ==
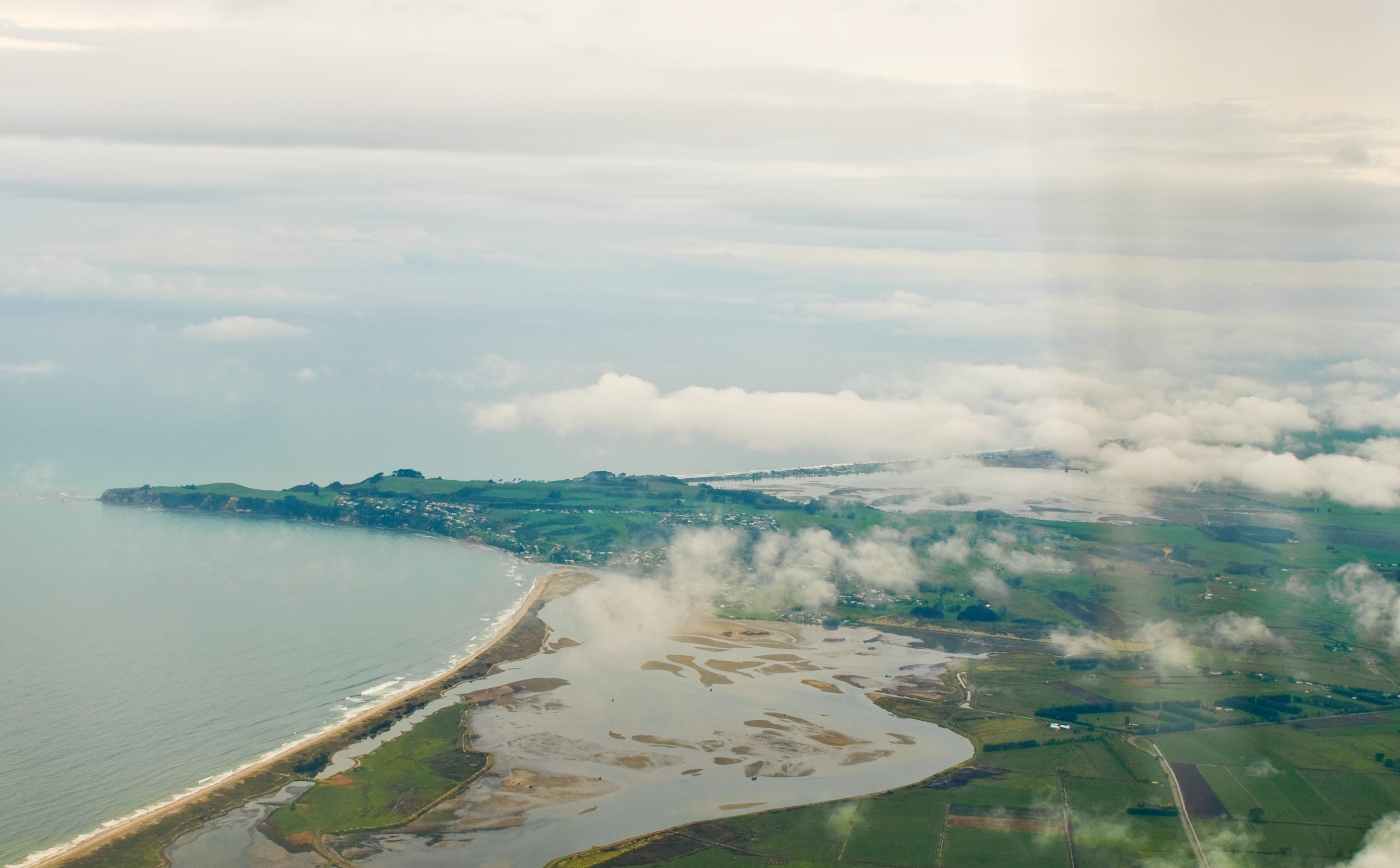
The Kaituna River enters the Bay of Plenty directly via Te Tumu Cut, and at the Maketu Estuary (pictured)

Kaituna River flows north from the Ōkere Inlet of Lake Rotoiti, the location of Okere Falls, a small settlement on the lake. This section of the river is referred to as the Ōkere River by locals. Notable waterfalls in the upper gorge are Okere Falls, Tutea Falls (the highest commercially rafted waterfall), and Trout Pool Falls, all of which are accessible via the Okere Falls track. The river is joined by numerous tributaries, including the Paraiti River, Raparapahoe Canal and Kopuaroa Canal.

The majority of the river empties into the Bay of Plenty via the Te Tumu Cut, a man-made channel constructed in 1956. Smaller amounts of water flow into the former natural mouth of the river, the Maketu Estuary, via the Papahikawai Channel, and a man made channel called Ford's Cut. The Kaituna River historically bypassed the Maketu Estuary during times of high flooding, flowing directly into the Bay of Plenty near the modern Te Tumu Cut once every 30-50 years.

== History ==
The river has traditional significance in Māori culture, especially to Te Arawa-affiliated iwi and hapū. Traditional stories describe the Arawa migratory waka visiting the river catchment, and finding small communities already living in the area. The descendants of the ancestors Ngātoro-i-rangi, Tama-te-kapua, Tia and Hei settled in the river catchment, establishing kāinga and fortified pā. Modern iwi and hapū, who trace their lineage to these ancestors, include Tapuika, Waitaha, Ngāti Rangiwewehi, Ngāti Pikiao and Ngāti Whakaue. The river is an important traditional resource, and was used for fishing, with the riperian edges used to grow crops, including kūmara, and the harvesting of harakeke (flax). The name of the river refers to eels being a major food resource.

In 1879, early European settlers petitioned the government for 3,000 acres (1,200 ha) of land at Te Puke, and established a flax industry along the Kaituna River shores. The river became a major transportation route between Te Puke and Tauranga in the latter 19th century. In 1881, snags were removed from the river to allow river boats to run between Canaan Landing, near Te Puke, and the river port at Maketu from May 1881, until Northern Steamship closed its office on 29 September 1917.

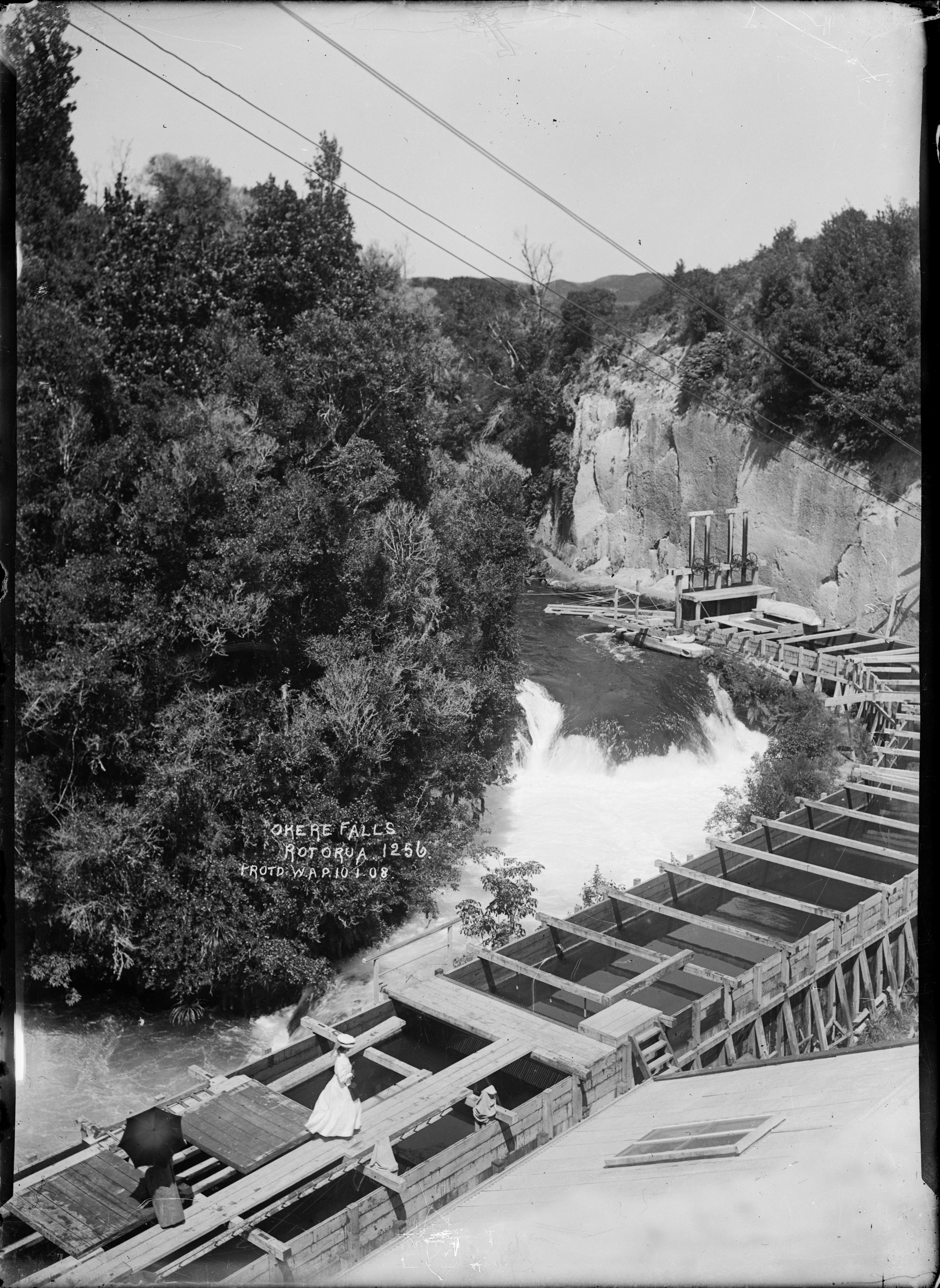
The Okere Falls Power Station c. 1908

The Okere Falls Power Station was established at the source of the river in 1901, as the first generating plant built by the New Zealand government. Several proposals for a larger power station have been considered, but the high cost of those projects has meant that none have been built to date. The power station operated until 1936.

In 1907, a major flood led to the river bypassing the Maketu Estuary and flowing directly into the Bay of Plenty. In 1922, Ford's Cut was constructed between the river and Maketu Estuary as an attempt to direct floodwaters towards the estuary. A new channel directly into the ocean, the Te Tumu Cut, was constructed in 1956. By the 1980s, that had led to significant ecological degradation of the Maketu Estuary.

During the 1960s and 1980s, much of the river catchment underwent significant drainage works. The river and its tributaries were straightened and stopbanks were constructed.

During the 1970s, Lake Rotorua was becoming eutrophic under heavy nutrient loadings, leading the Ministry of Works to propose diverting some sewage flow into the Kaituna River. Local iwi objected however, and filed a claim with the Waitangi Tribunal. Their objections included the insult to other iwi (leading to loss of mana) and destruction of the rivers mauri (life force or essence) which they believed would destroy its ability to sustain aquatic life. However, the Ministry of Works report stated that the mauri concept was essentially religious in nature and not scientifically verifiable, while on the other hand, diluting the waste would help prevent excess pollution and keep costs at a reasonable level. In Māori culture, religion and science are not treated separately as they tend to be in Western culture. In 1990 however, the Rotorua Land Treatment Scheme saw an upgrade to treatment facilities to remove 80% of nitrogen and phosphorus from the effluent, and land application to reduce eutrophication and satisfy Māori cultural wishes. This has led to better environmental, economic and cultural outcomes for all parties.

In 1982, the Ōkere Gates were constructed at the source of the river, to regulate the flow of water between Lake Rotoiti and the Kaituna River.

In 2008 there was a consultation regarding the installation of a new 13.5 megawatts (18,100 hp) hydro electric power dam below the river at the end of Trout Pool Road. This would involve the creation of a man made dam and the flooding of some land, destroying a section of river known as "Awesome Gorge" and leaving the section known as "Gnarly Gorge" with a highly reduced flow. Kayaking and rafting groups and local iwi raised objections. The Department of Conservation granted a concession for the project in December 2007.

== Whitewater rafting ==
The Kaituna River is a world-famous white-water destination. The river has been run regularly by rafting and kayak since 1991. It is used for recreational kayaking, commercial tandem kayaking, rafting and sledging. It is a winter destination for paddlers from the northern hemisphere. The entrance to the upper gorge contains a slalom course that has been used by international teams for their off-season training prior to world championships and Olympic competition. The upper gorge contains a number of play features, including the famous "bottom hole". The entire river has been run. The temperate rainforest, warm water, and its unusual character means the river is well known in international whitewater kayak videos.

== Gallery ==
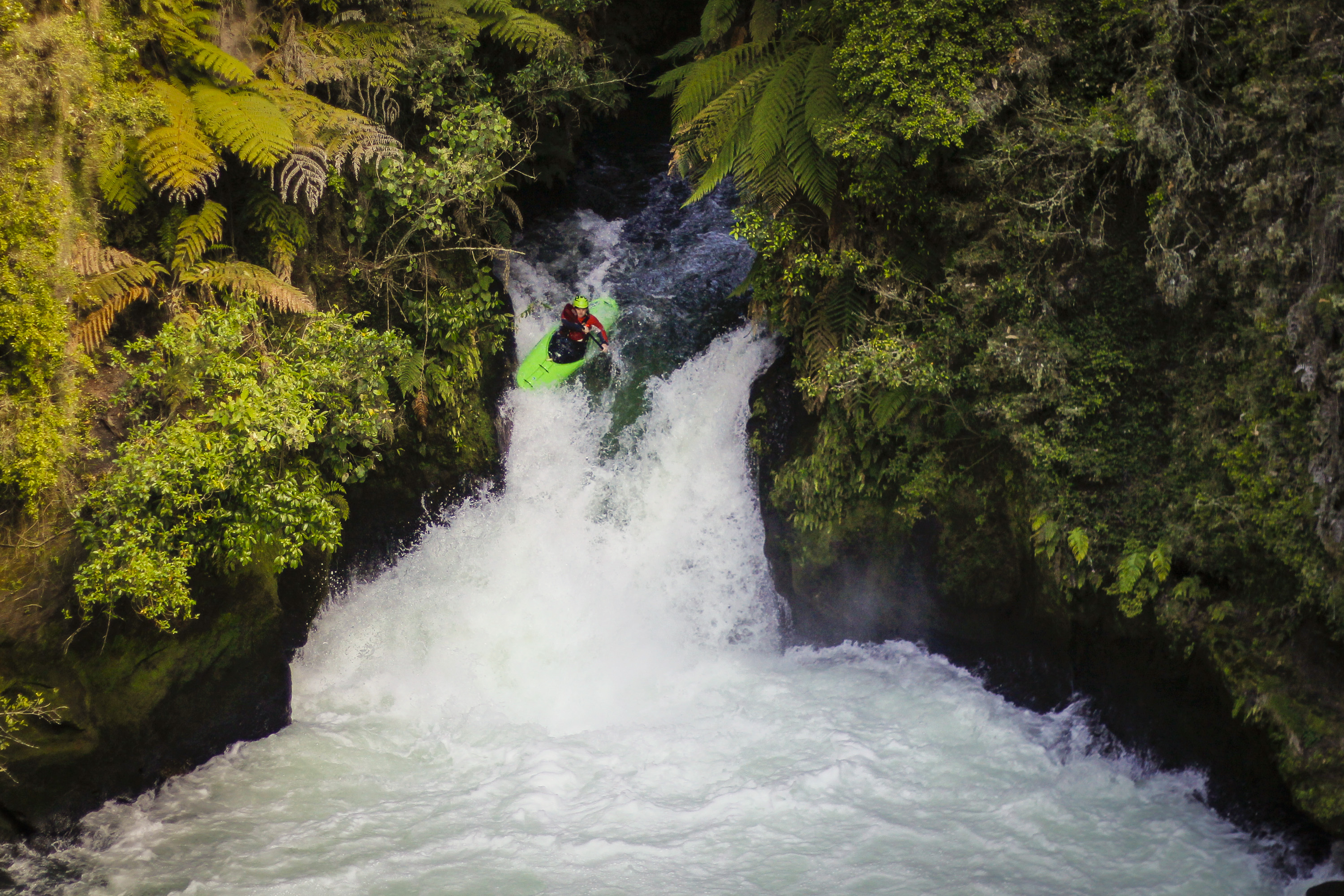
Tutea Falls

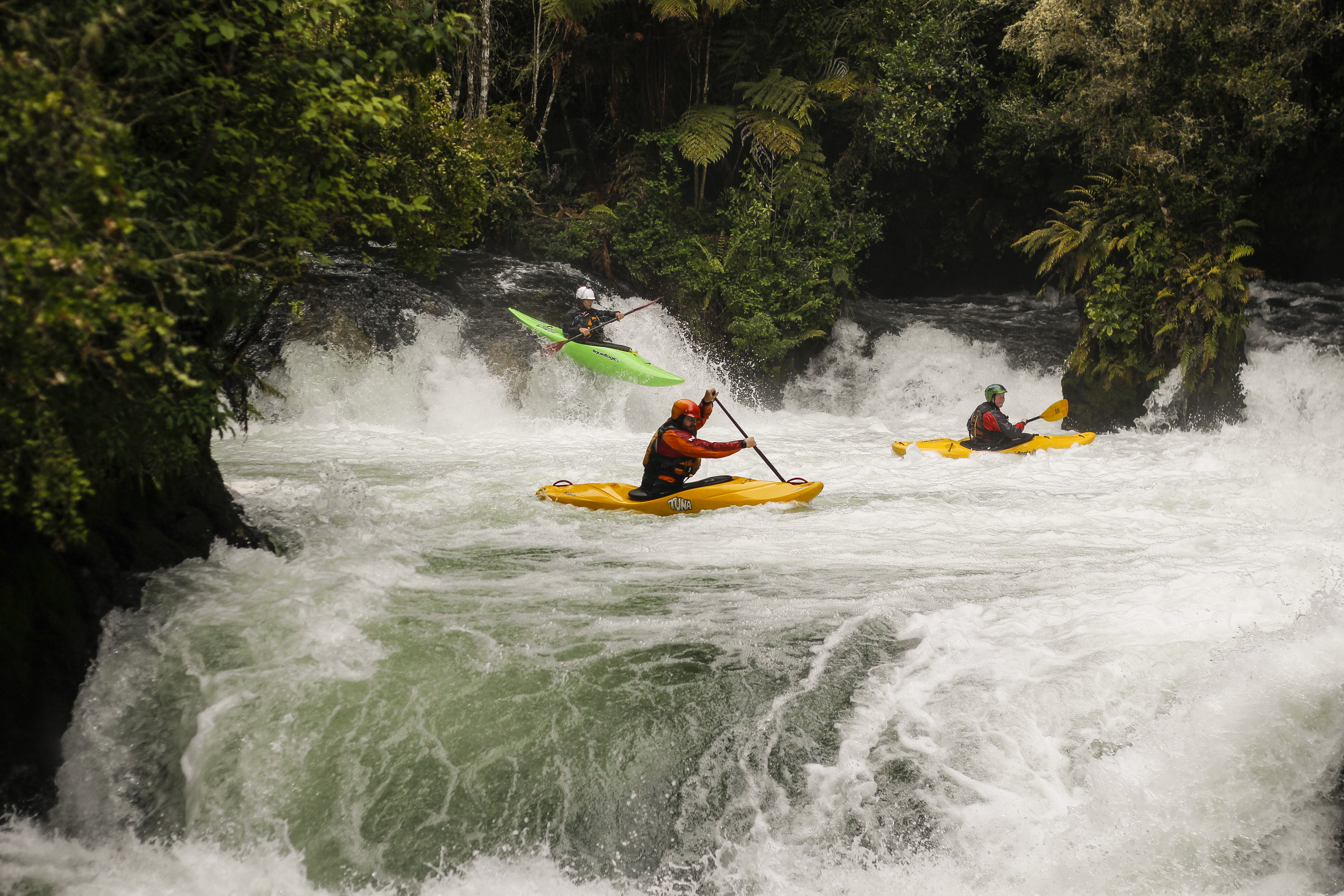
The Weir

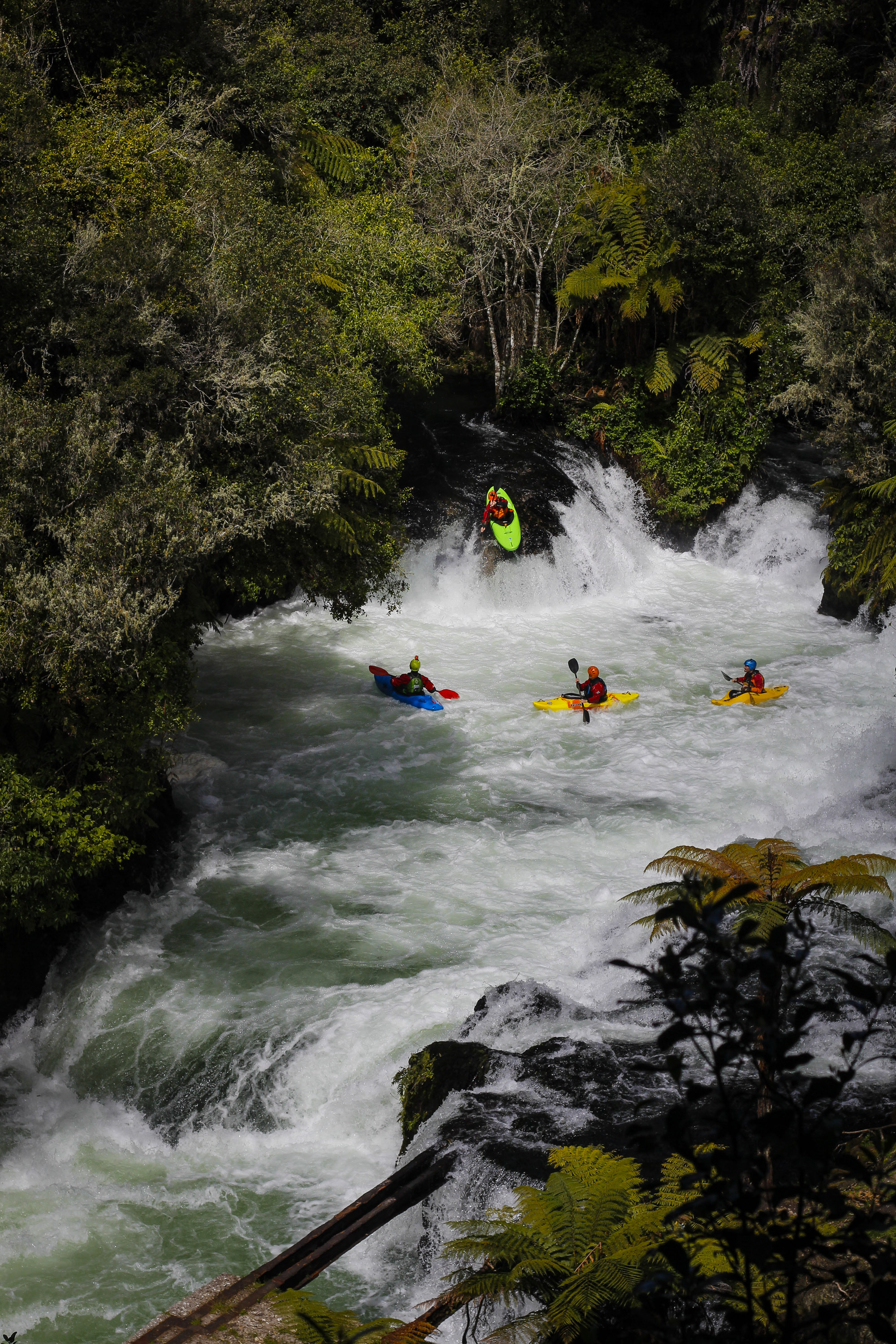
Okere Falls and The Weir

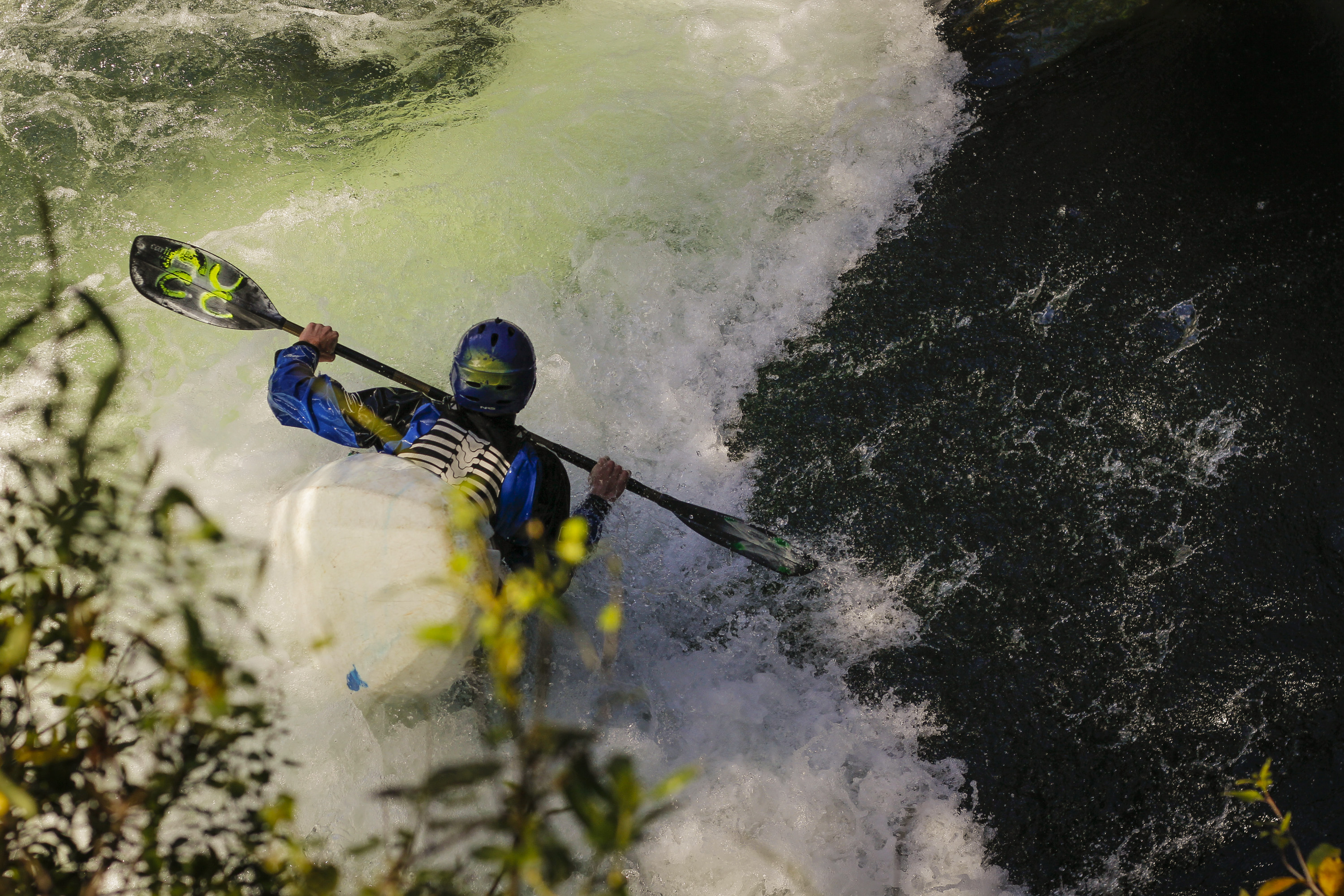
Bottom Play Hole

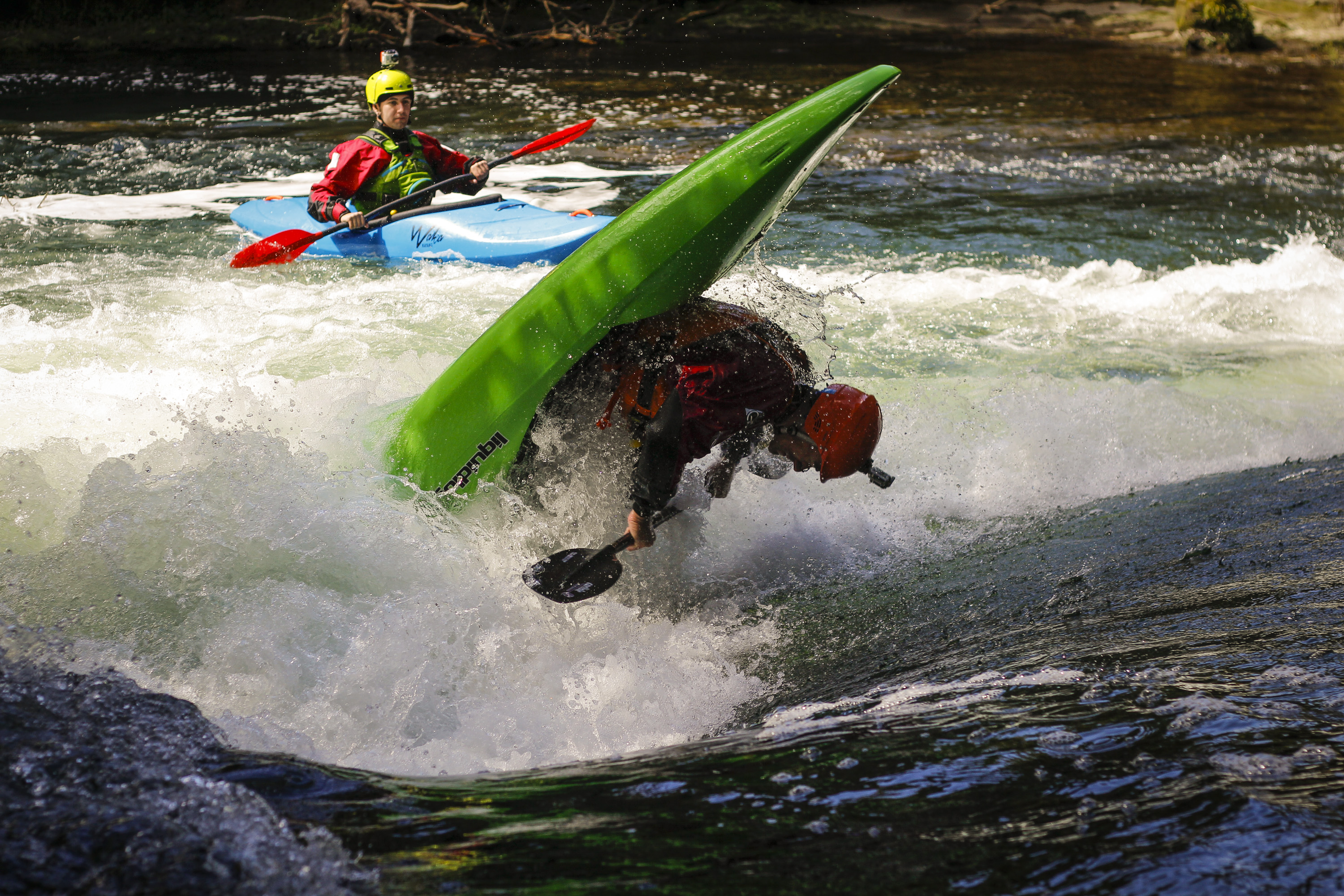
Bottom Play Hole
