= Te Puke High School =

School in New Zealand

Location
- 19 Tui Street; Te Puke 3119; New Zealand; 37°47′17.49″S 176°19′5.33″E

Information
- Funding type: State
- Motto: Aim High – Plus Ultra; Whaia Te Matauranga Tiketike
- Ministry of Education Institution no.: 123
- Principal: Alan Liddle
- Years offered: 9–13
- Gender: Coeducational
- Enrolment: 1,104 (July 2026
- Houses: Blake, Hillary, Morihana, Ngata, Sheppard
- Colours: Navy Blue, White, Maroon
- Nickname: TPHS
- Socio-economic decile: 3
- Website: tphs.nz

Te Puke High School is a state, co-educational secondary school located in Te Puke, New Zealand. The school serves students from Year 9 to Year 13, and had a roll of 915 students as of February 2017.

== Students ==
The two largest ethnic groups at the school are New Zealand European, which comprises 45% of students, and Māori, which comprises 37%. The rest of the school comprises 5% Indian, 4% Other European, 3% Kiribati, 2% Other Pacific, 2% South East Asian, 1% Other Asian and 1% Other. 51% of students are female, and 49% are male.

== Curriculum ==
Te Puke High School redesigned the Junior School Curriculum (Years 9 and 10) around 2015–2016, for "21st Century Learning" moving away from the traditional isolated subject classes (e.g. Mathematics or English) and enhanced the Integrated Learning approach. They created "Themes" consisting of five core subjects, English, History/Social Science, Mathematics, Physical Education/Health and Science, in which all five subjects are taught in a cross-curricular approach. They created SPINS (SPecial INterest Subjects) which have been traditionally called "Options" (e.g. Materials, Drama, Visual Arts). The final aspect was Foci. Foci's are where students can enhance a deeper understanding/knowledge into a particular interest of two subjects (e.g. A "Board Gaming" foci can focus on the Mathematical and Social Science sides of "gaming", and interest "gaming" students. Te Puke High School is looking to integrate some of these concepts into the Senior Curriculum over the next few years.

== Facilities ==
In 2013, some redevelopment took place at the school. A main school block was created in a 'V' shape, with several learning pods on each side, the special needs unit at the tip, and a large courtyard in the centre. Each "pod" can have up to three classes operating within it at a time, and science labs are located between the pods. The school wharenui was also rebuilt. In early 2017, the Performing Arts/Administration Block went under much needed renovations.

== Houses ==
Te Puke High School consists of five houses/factions:

- Blake – Red

Named after Sir Peter Blake

- Hillary – Yellow

Named after Sir Edmund Hillary

- Morihana – Purple

Named after Sir Howard Morrison

- Ngata – Green

Named after Sir Āpirana Ngata

- Sheppard – Blue

Named after Kate Sheppard

== Notable alumni ==
- Ruia Morrison – tennis player
- Joan Chapple – New Zealand's first plastic and hand surgeon, also a photographer (1934–2013)
