= Rangiuru =

Rural community in the Bay of Plenty, New Zealand

- Interactive map of Rangiuru
- Coordinates: 37.844254°S 176.361105°E
- Country: New Zealand
- Region: Bay of Plenty
- Territorial authority: Western Bay of Plenty District
- Ward: Maketu-Te Puke Ward
- Established: pre-European
- Electorates: East Cape; Waiariki (Māori)

Government
  - Territorial authority: Western Bay of Plenty District Council
  - Regional council: Bay of Plenty Regional Council
  - Mayor of Western Bay of Plenty: James Denyer
  - East Cape MP: Dana Kirkpatrick
  - Waiariki MP: Rawiri Waititi

Area
  - Total: 22.79 km^{2} (8.80 sq mi)
- Elevation: 27 m (89 ft)

Population (2023 Census)
  - Total: 333
  - Density: 14.6/km^{2} (37.8/sq mi)
- Time zone: UTC+12 (NZST)
  - Summer (DST): UTC+13 (NZDT)
- Postcode: 3189
- Area code: 07

Rangiuru is a rural community in the Bay of Plenty of New Zealand's North Island.

== Demographics ==
Rangiuru community covers 22.79 km^{2} (8.80 sq mi). It is part of the Rangiuru statistical area.

Historical population of the community
Year	Pop.	±% p.a.
2006	267	—
2013	279	+0.63%
2018	261	−1.32%
2023	312	+3.63%

Rangiuru community had a population of 312 in the 2023 New Zealand census, an increase of 51 people (19.5%) since the 2018 census, and an increase of 33 people (11.8%) since the 2013 census. There were 162 males, 147 females, and 3 people of other genders in 99 dwellings. 1.0% of people identified as LGBTIQ+. There were 69 people (22.1%) aged under 15 years, 60 (19.2%) aged 15 to 29, 135 (43.3%) aged 30 to 64, and 42 (13.5%) aged 65 or older.

People could identify as more than one ethnicity. The results were 77.9% European (Pākehā); 15.4% Māori; 8.7% Pasifika; 8.7% Asian; 3.8% Middle Eastern, Latin American and African New Zealanders (MELAA); and 11.5% other, which includes people giving their ethnicity as "New Zealander". English was spoken by 95.2%, Māori by 1.0%, and other languages by 12.5%. No language could be spoken by 1.0% (e.g. too young to talk). The percentage of people born overseas was 22.1, compared with 28.8% nationally.

Religious affiliations were 27.9% Christian, 2.9% Hindu, 1.0% Māori religious beliefs, and 5.8% other religions. People who answered that they had no religion were 51.9%, and 8.7% of people did not answer the census question.

Of those at least 15 years old, 42 (17.3%) people had a bachelor's or higher degree, 141 (58.0%) had a post-high school certificate or diploma, and 72 (29.6%) people exclusively held high school qualifications. 33 people (13.6%) earned over $100,000 compared to 12.1% nationally. The employment status of those at least 15 was 126 (51.9%) full-time, 48 (19.8%) part-time, and 6 (2.5%) unemployed.

=== Rangiuru statistical area ===
The Rangiuru statistical area, which also includes Te Ranga, covers 220.47 km^{2} (85.12 sq mi) and had an estimated population of 3,100 as of June 2025, with a population density of 14 people per km^{2}.

Historical population of the statistical area
Year	Pop.	±% p.a.
2006	2,376	—
2013	2,415	+0.23%
2018	2,676	+2.07%
2023	2,832	+1.14%

Rangiuru statistical area had a population of 2,832 in the 2023 New Zealand census, an increase of 156 people (5.8%) since the 2018 census, and an increase of 417 people (17.3%) since the 2013 census. There were 1,500 males, 1,329 females, and 6 people of other genders in 870 dwellings. 1.4% of people identified as LGBTIQ+. The median age was 36.7 years (compared with 38.1 years nationally). There were 576 people (20.3%) aged under 15 years, 573 (20.2%) aged 15 to 29, 1,269 (44.8%) aged 30 to 64, and 417 (14.7%) aged 65 or older.

People could identify as more than one ethnicity. The results were 66.7% European (Pākehā); 35.8% Māori; 6.6% Pasifika; 7.6% Asian; 1.5% Middle Eastern, Latin American and African New Zealanders (MELAA); and 3.6% other, which includes people giving their ethnicity as "New Zealander". English was spoken by 96.7%, Māori by 10.1%, Samoan by 0.2%, and other languages by 11.3%. No language could be spoken by 1.7% (e.g. too young to talk). New Zealand Sign Language was known by 0.3%. The percentage of people born overseas was 16.2, compared with 28.8% nationally.

Religious affiliations were 26.3% Christian, 1.1% Hindu, 0.3% Islam, 4.4% Māori religious beliefs, 0.4% Buddhist, 0.4% New Age, and 3.9% other religions. People who answered that they had no religion were 53.7%, and 9.9% of people did not answer the census question.

Of those at least 15 years old, 297 (13.2%) people had a bachelor's or higher degree, 1,254 (55.6%) had a post-high school certificate or diploma, and 708 (31.4%) people exclusively held high school qualifications. The median income was $40,100, compared with $41,500 nationally. 216 people (9.6%) earned over $100,000 compared to 12.1% nationally. The employment status of those at least 15 was 1,242 (55.1%) full-time, 327 (14.5%) part-time, and 87 (3.9%) unemployed.

== Marae ==
Rangiuru has three local marae:

- Te Matai or Ngāti Kurī Marae and its Tapuika meeting house are affiliated with the Tapuika hapū of Ngāti Kurī.
- Te Paamu Marae and Tia meeting house are affiliated with the Tapuika hapū of Ngāti Marukukere.
- Tūhourangi Marae and Tūhourangi meeting house are affiliated with Tūhourangi.

In October 2020, the Government committed $500,000 from the Provincial Growth Fund to upgrade the marae, and create 50 jobs.

== Education ==
Rangiuru School is a co-educational state primary school for Year 1 to 8 students, with a roll of 98 as of July 2026. The school opened in 1919.
