= Te Puke =

Town in the Bay of Plenty, New Zealand

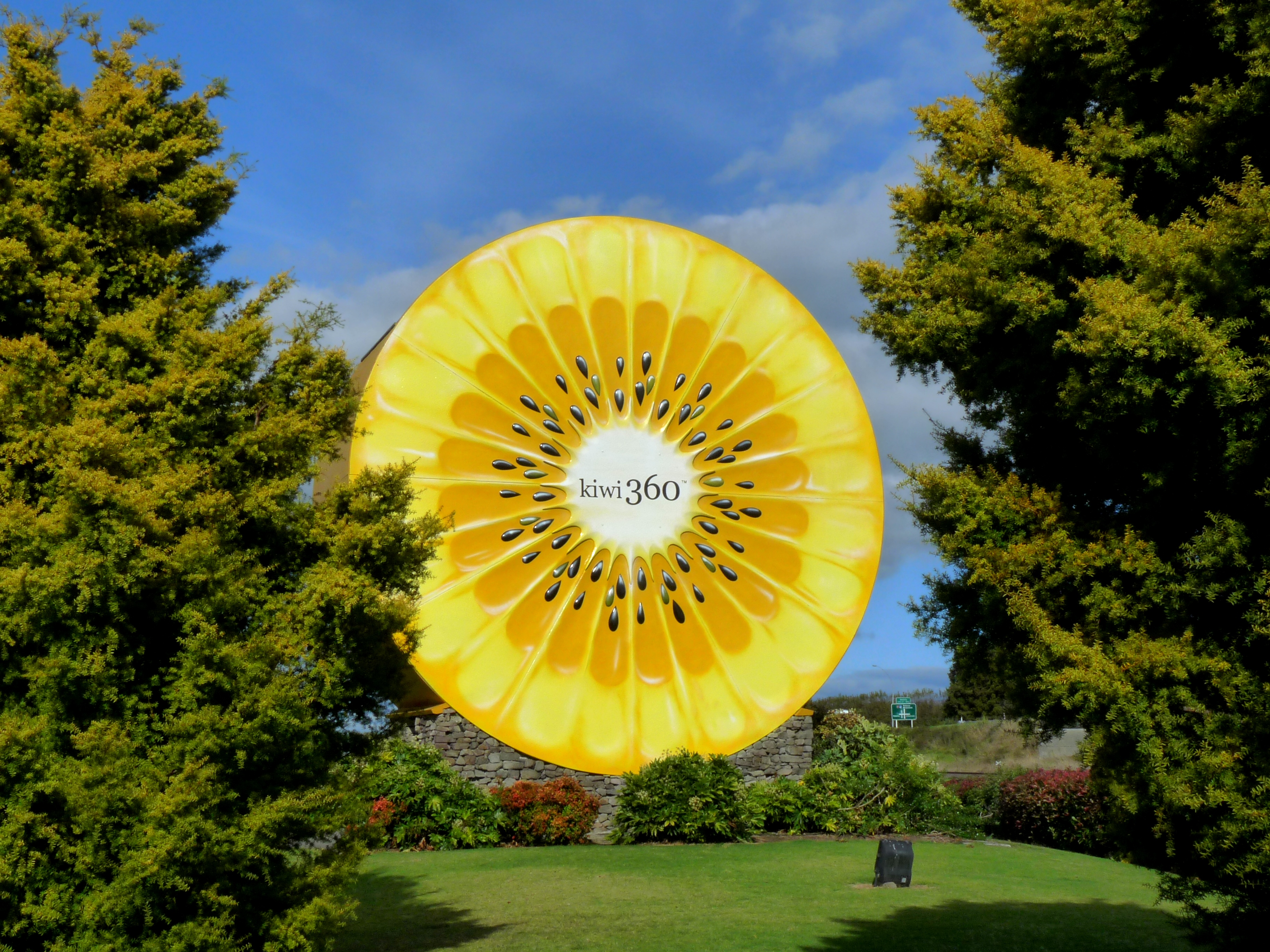
- The giant kiwifruit in Te Puke
- Interactive map of Te Puke
- Coordinates: 37°46′S 176°19′E
- Country: New Zealand
- Region: Bay of Plenty
- Territorial authority: Western Bay of Plenty District
- Ward: Maketu-Te Puke Ward
- Community: Te Puke Community
- Settled: pre-European
- Founded: 1880
- Electorates: Rotorua; Waiariki (Māori)

Government
  - Territorial authority: Western Bay of Plenty District Council
  - Regional council: Bay of Plenty Regional Council
  - Mayor of Western Bay of Plenty: James Denyer
  - Rotorua MP: Todd McClay
  - Waiariki MP: Rawiri Waititi

Area
  - Total: 12.13 km^{2} (4.68 sq mi)

Population (June 2025)
  - Total: 10,400
  - Density: 857/km^{2} (2,220/sq mi)
- Time zone: UTC+12 (NZST)
  - Summer (DST): UTC+13 (NZDT)
- Postcode: 3119
- Area code: 07
- Website: tepukegoodnessgrowshere

Te Puke (/tɛˈpʊkɛ/ teh-PUU-keh) is a town located 18 kilometres (11 miles) southeast of Tauranga in the Western Bay of Plenty of New Zealand. It is particularly well known for the cultivation of kiwifruit.

Te Puke is close to Tauranga and Maketu, which are both coastal towns/cities, as well as the small townships of Waitangi, Manoeka, Pongakawa, and Paengaroa. The Tauranga Eastern Link, completed in 2015, moved State Highway 2 away from Te Puke and removed large volumes of traffic from its streets.

The town's name comes from the Māori language, which translates to the hill; it is on a hill near the Papamoa Hills.

== Demographics ==
Te Puke covers 12.13 km^{2} (4.68 sq mi) and had an estimated population of 10,400 as of June 2025, with a population density of 857 people per km^{2}.

Historical population
Year	Pop.	±% p.a.
2006	6,960	—
2013	7,326	+0.73%
2018	8,631	+3.33%
2023	9,114	+1.09%
The 2006 population is for a larger area of 13.40 km^{2}. Source:

Te Puke had a population of 9,114 in the 2023 New Zealand census, an increase of 483 people (5.6%) since the 2018 census, and an increase of 1,788 people (24.4%) since the 2013 census. There were 4,530 males, 4,566 females, and 15 people of other genders in 2,964 dwellings. 2.1% of people identified as LGBTIQ+. The median age was 35.7 years (compared with 38.1 years nationally). There were 1,782 people (19.6%) aged under 15 years, 1,803 (19.8%) aged 15 to 29, 3,912 (42.9%) aged 30 to 64, and 1,614 (17.7%) aged 65 or older.

People could identify as more than one ethnicity. The results were 61.1% European (Pākehā); 29.0% Māori; 4.9% Pasifika; 20.3% Asian; 1.1% Middle Eastern, Latin American and African New Zealanders (MELAA); and 2.0% other, which includes people giving their ethnicity as "New Zealander". English was spoken by 92.7%, Māori by 7.0%, Samoan by 0.5%, and other languages by 16.3%. No language could be spoken by 2.6% (e.g. too young to talk). New Zealand Sign Language was known by 0.4%. The percentage of people born overseas was 25.4, compared with 28.8% nationally.

Religious affiliations were 26.6% Christian, 3.0% Hindu, 0.5% Islam, 3.7% Māori religious beliefs, 1.0% Buddhist, 0.3% New Age, and 11.0% other religions. People who answered that they had no religion were 47.1%, and 7.0% of people did not answer the census question.

Of those at least 15 years old, 1,116 (15.2%) people had a bachelor's or higher degree, 3,750 (51.1%) had a post-high school certificate or diploma, and 2,472 (33.7%) people exclusively held high school qualifications. The median income was $37,000, compared with $41,500 nationally. 399 people (5.4%) earned over $100,000 compared to 12.1% nationally. The employment status of those at least 15 was 3,687 (50.3%) full-time, 900 (12.3%) part-time, and 273 (3.7%) unemployed.

Individual statistical areas
Name	Area (km^{2})	Population	Density (per km^{2})	Dwellings	Median age	Median income
Te Puke West	8.11	3,597	444	1,089	33.1 years	$38,500
Te Puke East	2.18	2,736	1,255	936	36.1 years	$35,300
Te Puke South	1.84	2,775	1,508	942	40.3 years	$36,600
New Zealand					38.1 years	$41,500

== History ==
=== Development ===
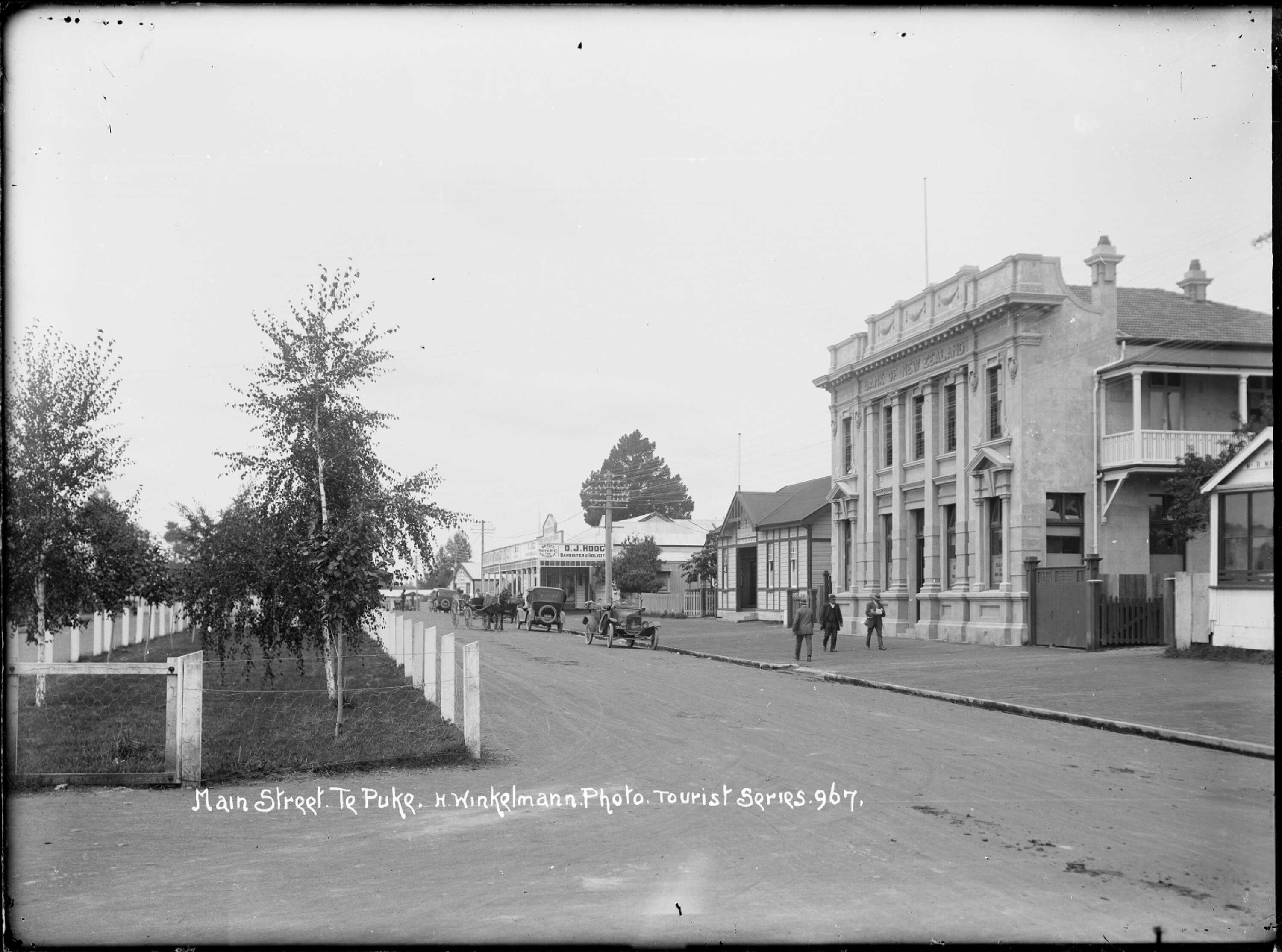
View of the main street of Te Puke in 1915

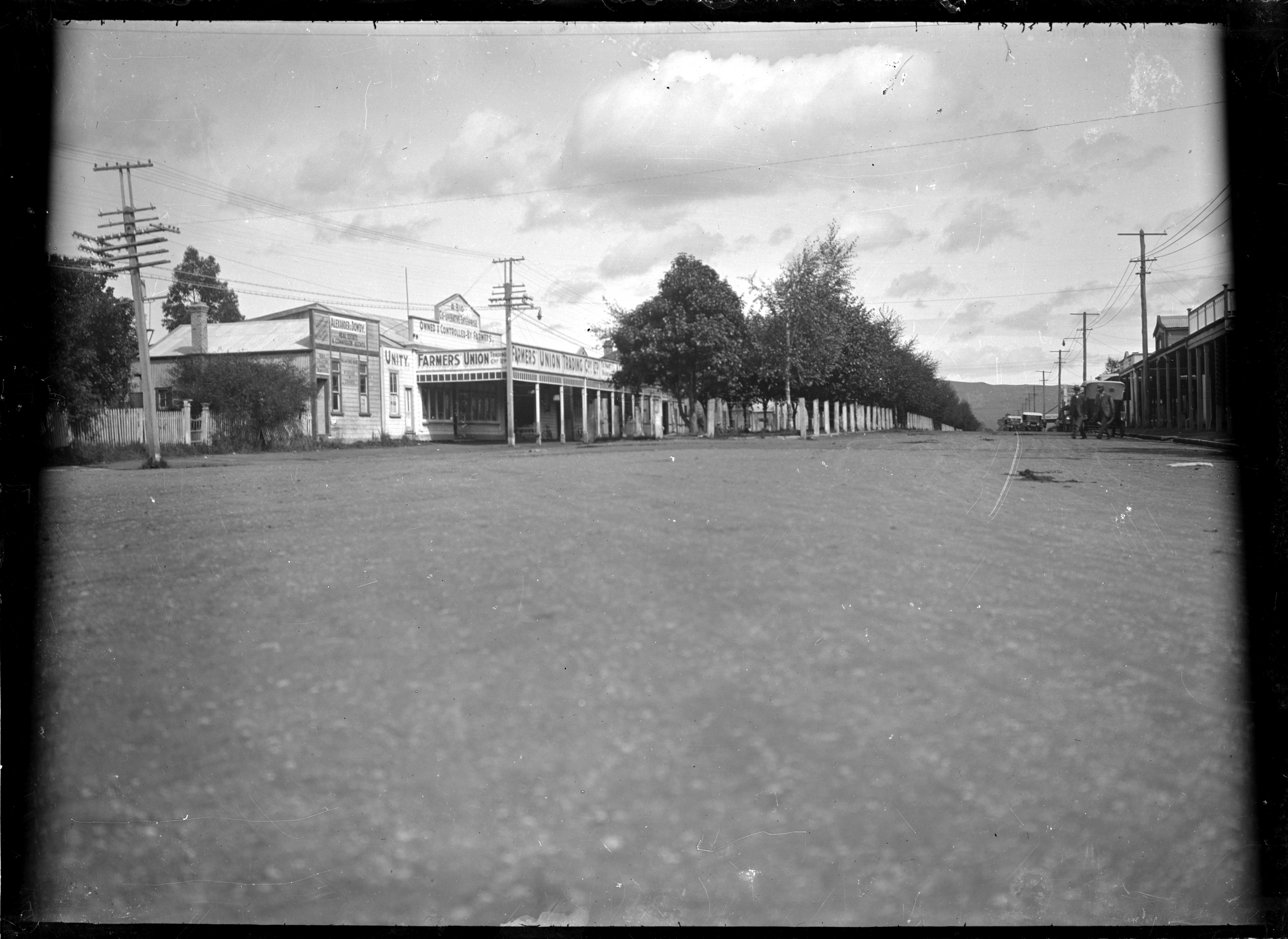
View of Main Street in 1924 including Alexander & Dowdy real estate agents, building and Farmers' Union Trading Company

=== Railway ===
The East Coast Main Trunk Railway passes through Te Puke and opened in 1928. Rail passenger services were provided by the Taneatua Express which operated between Auckland and Taneatua between 1928 and 1959. In February 1959, the steam hauled express train service was replaced by a railcar service operated by 88 seaters that only ran as far as Te Puke. The railcar service operated between 1959 and 1967, when it was cancelled due to both mechanical problems with the railcars and poor patronage, the latter largely due to the circuitous and time-consuming rail route between Auckland and the Bay of Plenty at that time.

== Marae ==
There are five marae in Te Puke, affiliated with local iwi and hapū:

- Haraki Marae and meeting house are affiliated with Waitaha and the Ngāti Rangiwewehi hapū of Ngāti Rangiwewehi ki Tai.
- Makahae – Te Kahika Marae is affiliated with the Tapuika hapū of Ngāti Tuheke. In October 2020, the Government committed $4,525,104 from the Provincial Growth Fund to upgrade the marae and nine others, creating an estimated 34 jobs.
- Manoeka Marae and Hei meeting house are affiliated with Waitaha.
- Moko – Ngāti Moko Marae and the Mokotangatakotahi meeting house are affiliated with the Tapuika hapū of Ngāti Moko.
- Tawakepito Marae and Tawakepito meeting house is affiliated with the Tapuika hapū of Ngāti Tuheke.

== Economy ==
Agriculture is the backbone of the district's economy. The warm, moist climate and fertile soils are favourable for horticulture, with production of kiwifruit, avocados and citrus fruit such as lemons and oranges. The town markets itself as the "Kiwifruit capital of the world". Dairy cattle and other livestock are also farmed.

Today, Te Puke has a reasonably large main shopping street, Jellicoe Street, which is also the main road passing through Te Puke. There are a number of schools, religious organisations, cultural groups, and a variety of clubs in the town.

A large number of residents work picking or packing kiwifruit during April or May, as well as others coming from other nearby towns and cities. It can swell past 10,000 some seasons.

== Education ==
Te Puke High School is the town's co-educational state high school for Year 9 to 13 students, with a roll of 1,104 as of July 2026. Te Puke District High School opened in 1923, and became Te Puke High School in 1954.

Te Puke has two state primary schools for Year 1 to 6 students: Fairhaven School, with a roll of 484, and Te Puke Primary School, with a roll of 306. Fairhaven School includes a Māori language immersion unit. The school opened in 1957. Te Puke Primary School opened in 1883.

It has one state intermediate school for Year 7 to 8 students: Te Puke Intermediate, with a roll of 518. The school includes a bilingual learning programme in Māori.

Te Kura Kaupapa o Te Matai is a co-educational state Māori language immersion primary school for Year 1 to 8 students, with a roll of 43. It opened in 1887 and became a full immersion Māori language school in 1996. Following a decline in roll, it made English a compulsory subject in 2010. The school is located 3 km southeast of Te Puke.

== Climate ==
Climate data for Te Puke (1991–2020 normals, extremes 1973–present)
Month	Jan	Feb	Mar	Apr	May	Jun	Jul	Aug	Sep	Oct	Nov	Dec	Year
Record high °C (°F)	32.5 (90.5)	33.0 (91.4)	30.1 (86.2)	27.4 (81.3)	24.0 (75.2)	20.6 (69.1)	19.5 (67.1)	20.5 (68.9)	24.9 (76.8)	25.3 (77.5)	31.5 (88.7)	32.2 (90.0)	33.0 (91.4)
Mean maximum °C (°F)	28.3 (82.9)	28.6 (83.5)	26.5 (79.7)	24.3 (75.7)	21.4 (70.5)	18.5 (65.3)	17.7 (63.9)	18.6 (65.5)	21.0 (69.8)	22.8 (73.0)	25.6 (78.1)	26.7 (80.1)	29.5 (85.1)
Mean daily maximum °C (°F)	24.0 (75.2)	24.1 (75.4)	22.6 (72.7)	20.2 (68.4)	17.6 (63.7)	15.1 (59.2)	14.4 (57.9)	15.3 (59.5)	16.8 (62.2)	18.5 (65.3)	20.3 (68.5)	22.2 (72.0)	19.3 (66.7)
Daily mean °C (°F)	18.8 (65.8)	19.1 (66.4)	17.4 (63.3)	15.1 (59.2)	12.7 (54.9)	10.4 (50.7)	9.8 (49.6)	10.4 (50.7)	12.0 (53.6)	13.6 (56.5)	15.2 (59.4)	17.4 (63.3)	14.3 (57.8)
Mean daily minimum °C (°F)	13.6 (56.5)	14.1 (57.4)	12.2 (54.0)	10.0 (50.0)	7.8 (46.0)	5.6 (42.1)	5.2 (41.4)	5.5 (41.9)	7.2 (45.0)	8.7 (47.7)	10.0 (50.0)	12.6 (54.7)	9.4 (48.9)
Mean minimum °C (°F)	7.9 (46.2)	8.6 (47.5)	7.0 (44.6)	3.8 (38.8)	1.6 (34.9)	0.0 (32.0)	−0.4 (31.3)	−0.1 (31.8)	1.5 (34.7)	2.5 (36.5)	4.0 (39.2)	6.9 (44.4)	−1.2 (29.8)
Record low °C (°F)	2.4 (36.3)	3.4 (38.1)	1.3 (34.3)	0.0 (32.0)	−2.0 (28.4)	−3.5 (25.7)	−2.9 (26.8)	−2.6 (27.3)	−0.5 (31.1)	−0.3 (31.5)	0.7 (33.3)	2.0 (35.6)	−3.5 (25.7)
Average rainfall mm (inches)	96.6 (3.80)	119.3 (4.70)	128.8 (5.07)	173.0 (6.81)	148.9 (5.86)	174.8 (6.88)	168.0 (6.61)	156.4 (6.16)	130.6 (5.14)	118.7 (4.67)	93.0 (3.66)	136.2 (5.36)	1,644.3 (64.72)
Source: Earth Sciences NZ
