= Toatoa =

Toatoa is a Māori word that is the common name for several species of plants that are endemic to New Zealand.

- Haloragis erecta
- Phyllocladus alpinus
- Phyllocladus toatoa
- Phyllocladus trichomanoides, also known as tanekaha
