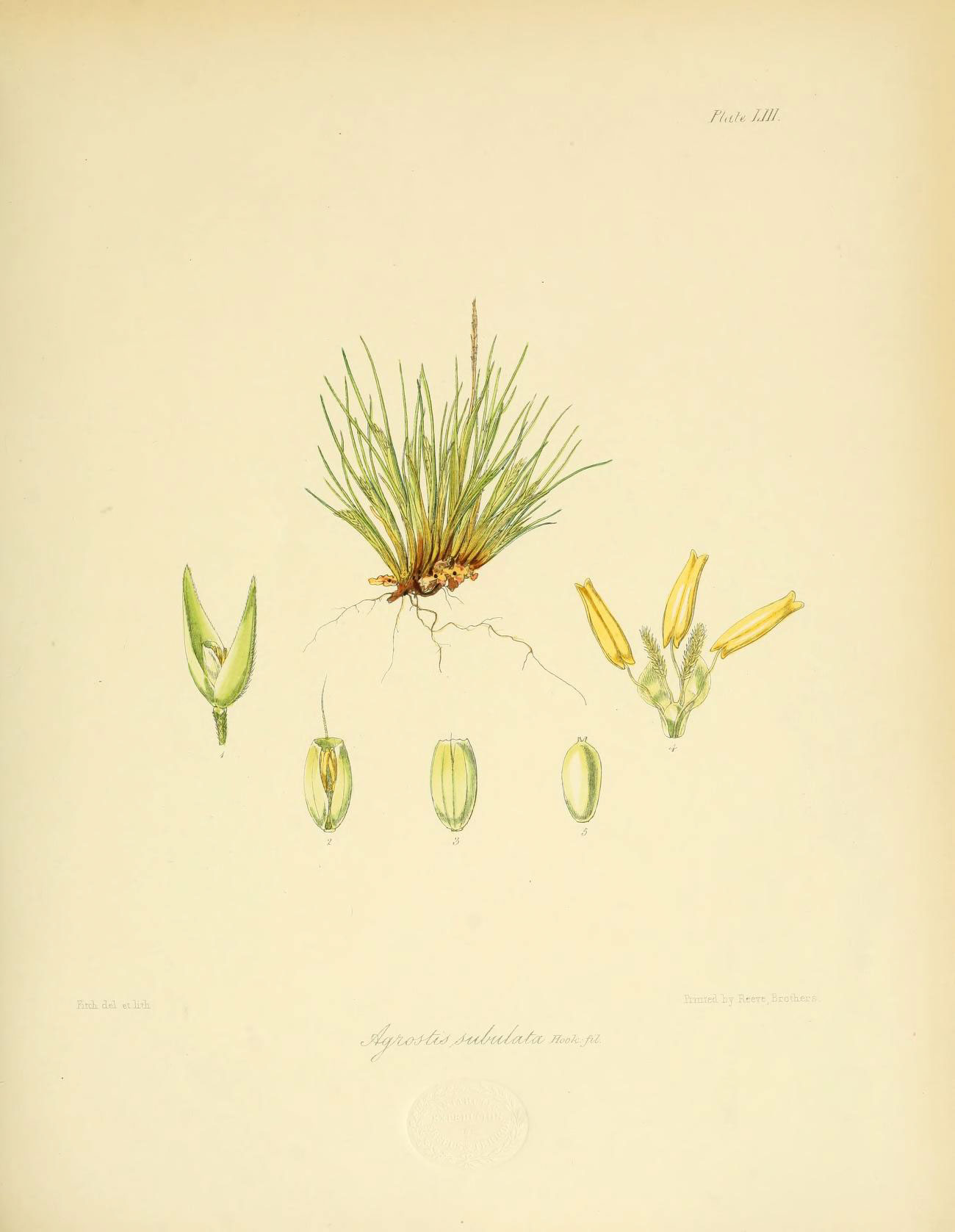
- Plate LIII (artist Fitch)

Conservation status
- Naturally Uncommon (NZ TCS)

Scientific classification
- Kingdom: Plantae
- Clade: Embryophytes
- Clade: Tracheophytes
- Clade: Spermatophytes
- Clade: Angiosperms
- Clade: Monocots
- Clade: Commelinids
- Order: Poales
- Family: Poaceae
- Subfamily: Pooideae
- Genus: Agrostis
- Species: A. subulata

Binomial name
- Agrostis subulata Hook.f.

= Agrostis subulata =

Species of grass

Agrostis subulata is a member of the genus Agrostis, in the tribe Poeae and family Poaceae (i.e., the grass family). It is endemic to the New Zealand Subantarctic Islands, specifically the Auckland Islands, Campbell Island, and Antipodes Island.

== Description ==
Agrostis subulata is a perennial, densely tufted, clumping grass, with erect dull blue-green leaves which are taller than the spiked inflorescences.

A. subulata is similar to A. muelleriana, another small, cold-climate Agrostis species which also has dense panicles. However, the two species are geographically separated (A. muelleriana is not found on the New Zealand Subantarctic Islands), and the glumes, panicle branches, and leaves of A. subulata are more scabrid.

== Habitat ==
It is found in herbfields, in Chionochloa antarctica grasslands and on peat covered rock ledges.

== Conservation status ==
Agrostis subulata was deemed At Risk - Naturally Uncommon in 2023 under the New Zealand Threat Classification System. All previous iterations of conservation statuses of vascular plants in Aotearoa New Zealand (2009, 2014, and 2018) also considered A. subulata At Risk - Naturally Uncommon.

While no specific threats have been listed, the classifier Range Restricted, meaning that the plant is only found in a small area, has always been attached to the designation. While many range restricted species are not known to be declining, they are still at greater threat than widespread species, because new threats are more likely to rapidly cause decline.

== Taxonomy ==
Agrostis subulata was first described in 1845 by Joseph Hooker in his Flora Antarctica.

=== Etymology ===
Agrostis - from the Greek agrostis (a forage plant, a kind of grass), cf. agros (a field).

subulata - From the Latin subulatus (awl-shaped, tapered from a broad base to a fine point).
