= Pureora Forest Park =

Protected rainforest park in New Zealand

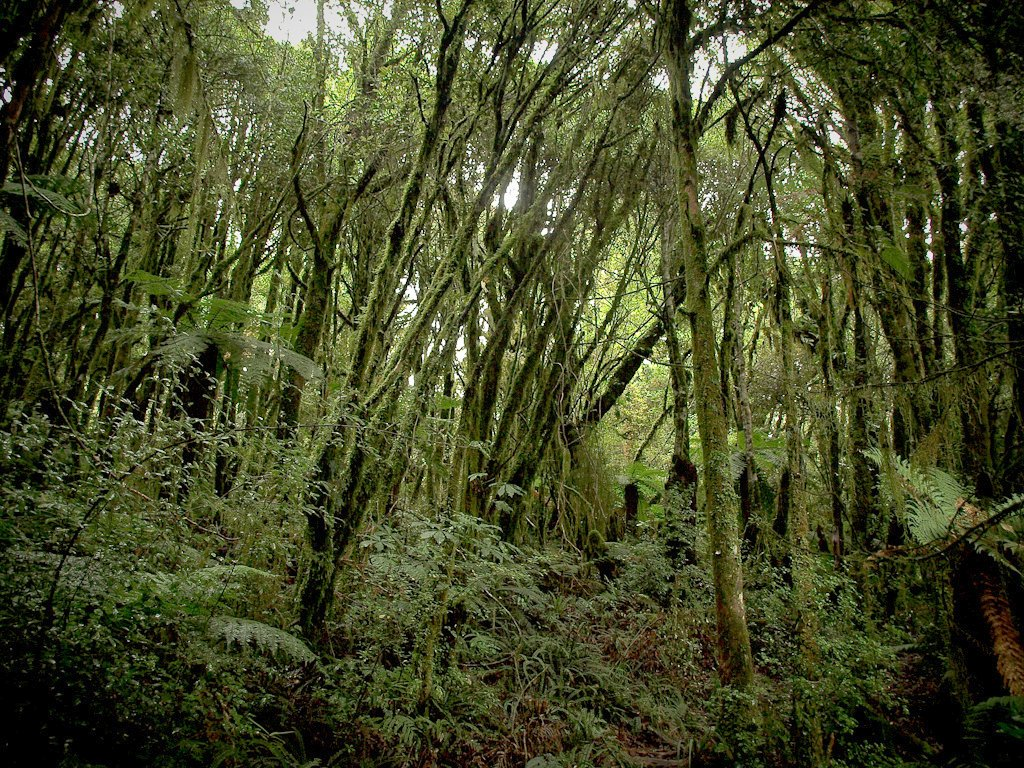
- Pureora Forest Park

- Location within New Zealand
- Location: North Island, New Zealand
- Nearest city: Rotorua
- Coordinates: 38°37′S 175°32′E
- Area: 75,957 hectares (187,690 acres)
- Established: 1978
- Governing body: Department of Conservation

Pureora Forest Park is a 760-square-kilometre (290 sq mi) protected area in the North Island of New Zealand. Within its rich rainforest are an abundance of 1,000-year-old podocarp trees. It is "recognised as one of the finest rain forests in the world". Established in 1978, after a series of protests and tree sittings, the park is one of the largest intact tracts of native forest in the North Island and has high conservation value due to the variety of plant life and animal habitats. New Zealand's largest tōtara tree is located nearby on private land.

== History ==
Anti-logging protests were led by conservation activists Stephen King, Shirley Guildford, and others in the late 1970s in what is now Pureora Forest Park. They had a novel way of erecting platforms on treetops, sitting over it to protest logging operations in the forests. The result of their efforts was tri-fold: the park was established in 1978; the New Zealand Government changed rules to meet the protesters' demand to permanently stop logging operations; and the Native Forest Restoration Trust was formed which ensured that the park develops several areas into its present format. One of the pine forest areas that was restored with native species of trees, with great efforts of Guildford, was named in her memory in 1988 a year after her death as the "Shirley Guildford Grove".

== Geography ==
Bounded by the Rangitoto and Hauhungaroa Ranges, Pureora Forest Park is situated between Lake Taupō and Te Kūiti, mostly in Waikato region but some of the park to the south is in the Manawatū-Whanganui region. It is accessible from State Highway 32, which lies to the west of Lake Taupō. Peaks include Mount Pureora (1,165 metres (3,822 ft)), and Mount Titiraupenga (1,042 metres (3,419 ft)). To the north west is a peak called Pukeokahu (844 metres (2,769 ft)) that should not be confused with a mountain of the same name much further south in the Rangitikei District of Manawatū-Whanganui region. They are popular among the bike trekkers and also the mountain hikers who use the mountain routes through the park to reach the peaks.

Within the park are Waihora Lagoon and Waihora Stream. The Okahukura Stream is east of Okahukura Road. The Waipa Mires can be seen from Select Loop Road. There are several valleys within the park. These include the Mangakahu Valley, as well as the Tunawaea Valley southeast of Ōtorohanga. The Maramataha Valley is located in the southwestern part of the park and the nearby Maramataha River is impassable in high water.

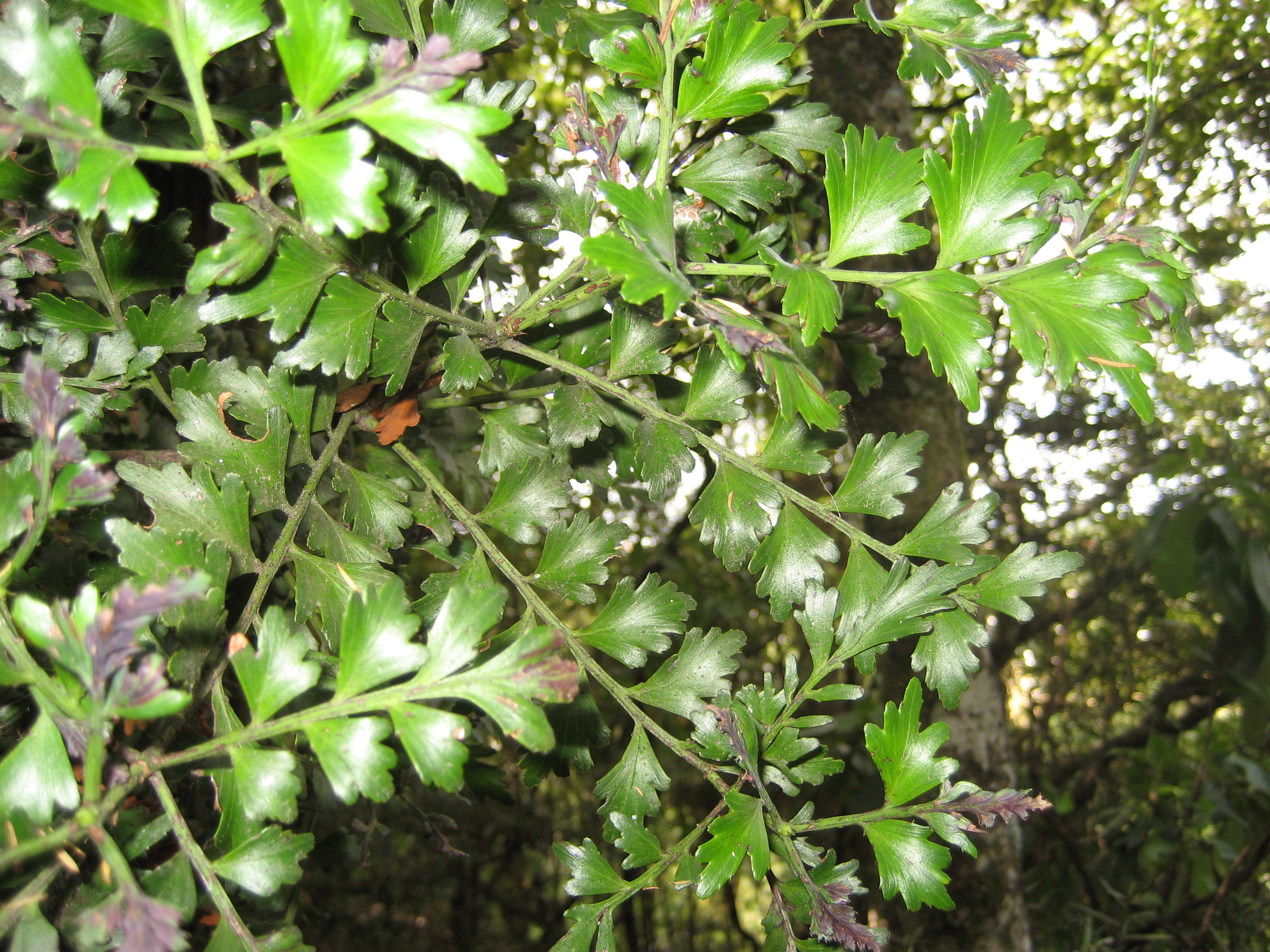
Remains of tānekaha (Phyllocladus trichomanoides) were found at the subfossil forest discovered within the park in 1983.

A buried, subfossil forest that had been submerged under pumice after the eruption of Taupō crater (c. AD 186) was discovered in 1983. The way the trees fell following the eruption is still evident, with the large tree trunks lying in rows.

=== Climate ===
Climate data for Pureora Forest, elevation 549 m (1,801 ft), (1991–2020 normals, extremes 1947–present)
Month	Jan	Feb	Mar	Apr	May	Jun	Jul	Aug	Sep	Oct	Nov	Dec	Year
Record high °C (°F)	30.0 (86.0)	29.8 (85.6)	29.5 (85.1)	23.9 (75.0)	20.6 (69.1)	16.5 (61.7)	15.8 (60.4)	18.4 (65.1)	21.7 (71.1)	23.9 (75.0)	27.3 (81.1)	27.8 (82.0)	30.0 (86.0)
Mean daily maximum °C (°F)	20.6 (69.1)	21.0 (69.8)	19.1 (66.4)	15.9 (60.6)	12.8 (55.0)	10.3 (50.5)	9.6 (49.3)	10.5 (50.9)	12.2 (54.0)	14.1 (57.4)	16.3 (61.3)	18.6 (65.5)	15.1 (59.1)
Daily mean °C (°F)	15.3 (59.5)	15.9 (60.6)	13.9 (57.0)	11.2 (52.2)	8.8 (47.8)	6.6 (43.9)	5.8 (42.4)	6.6 (43.9)	8.1 (46.6)	9.9 (49.8)	11.5 (52.7)	13.9 (57.0)	10.6 (51.1)
Mean daily minimum °C (°F)	10.0 (50.0)	10.7 (51.3)	8.8 (47.8)	6.5 (43.7)	4.7 (40.5)	3.0 (37.4)	2.1 (35.8)	2.7 (36.9)	3.9 (39.0)	5.6 (42.1)	6.7 (44.1)	9.2 (48.6)	6.2 (43.1)
Record low °C (°F)	−2.5 (27.5)	−2.2 (28.0)	−4.5 (23.9)	−5.8 (21.6)	−7.8 (18.0)	−7.5 (18.5)	−9.0 (15.8)	−7.9 (17.8)	−6.3 (20.7)	−4.7 (23.5)	−2.7 (27.1)	−1.9 (28.6)	−9.0 (15.8)
Average rainfall mm (inches)	111.3 (4.38)	75.8 (2.98)	83.2 (3.28)	136.8 (5.39)	142.1 (5.59)	162.3 (6.39)	146.9 (5.78)	185.2 (7.29)	178.7 (7.04)	109.8 (4.32)	104.2 (4.10)	109.5 (4.31)	1,545.8 (60.85)
Source: NIWA

== Fauna and flora ==
Lower altitudes are characterised by tawa and tree ferns, as well as tall native trees, including kahikatea, mataī, miro, rimu, and tōtara. The Pouakani Tōtara tree, New Zealand's tallest Tōtara, is located east of the Field Centre. The giant tōtara, rimu, mataī, miro and kahikatea trees tower 40–60 metres, and belong to an ancient family of trees dating from the dinosaur era. Higher altitudes include kāmahi and Hall's tōtara; sub-alpine herbs are abundant near the peaks. Grasses within the park include toetoe. The Pouakani Tōtara Tree is the largest recorded tōtara tree in New Zealand and is located just outside the park in the Wairapara Moana Incorporation reserve, located on the SH30 road.

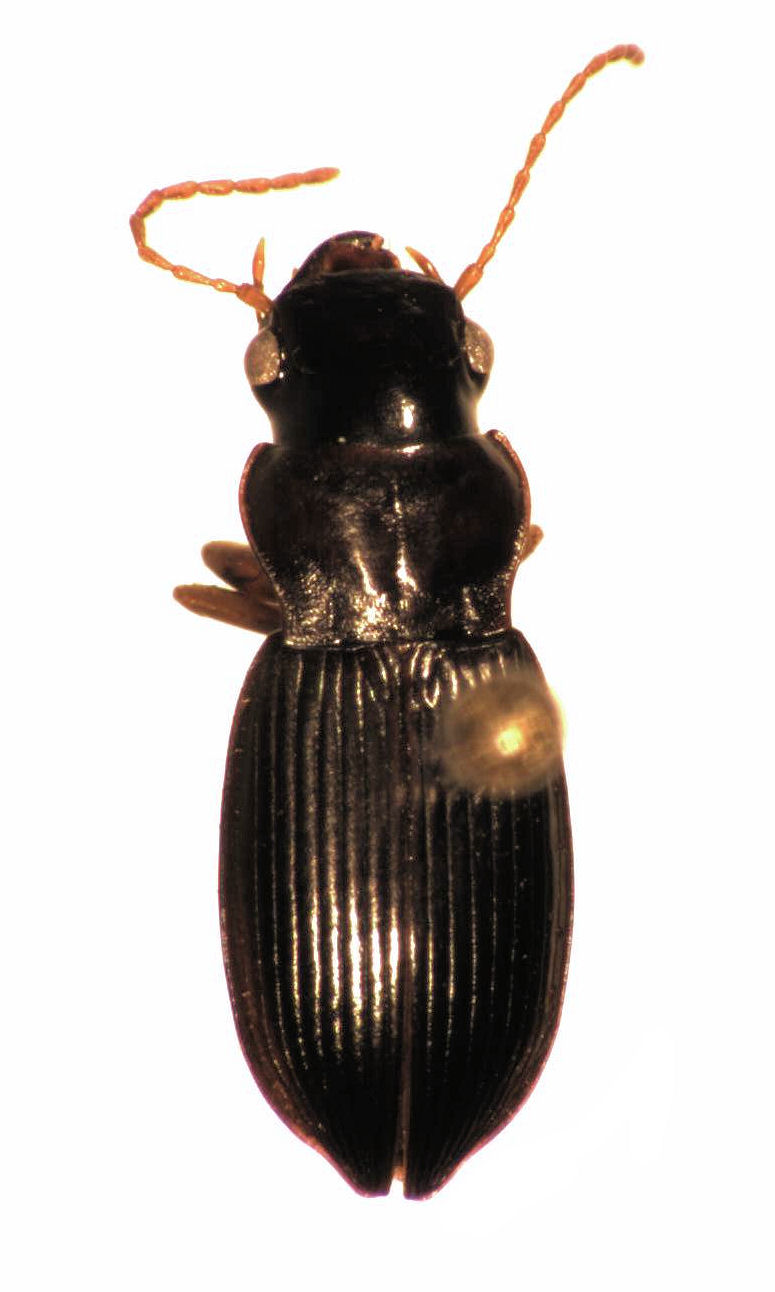
Allocinopus sculpticollis, from Mount Pureora.

The invasive house mouse has a significant population within the park. There is rich native bird life in the forest including the rare North Island kōkako and the kākā, kākāriki, kūkū (kererū, a native pigeon), and North Island robin. Sika deer have been shot or sighted within the confines of the park, believed to be an illegal liberation. Pigs are present, and of the at least eleven pest species that co-exist within the park, possums and goats are subject to management operations.

== Tourism ==
Camping, picnicking, swimming, and mountain biking (e.g. the Timber Trail opened in 2013) are popular within the park's confines. And the Pureora Forest Park Hunting Competition has brought hunters to the area since 1987.

There are many areas in the park that are interesting to both tourists and scientists. The Forest Tower is a 12-metre-tall tower located about ten minutes by foot from the Bismarck Road car park. Popular with ornithologists, birds such as kūkū, kākāriki, and kākā are evident in the area. The 1978 Treetop Protest Site is still accessible today and includes platforms high in the trees. A 1940s steam hauler, used to transport logs through the forest for milling, and a 2-tonne Caterpillar tractor are still present in the reserve; the latter was used in the 1950s to harvest many totara for posts.

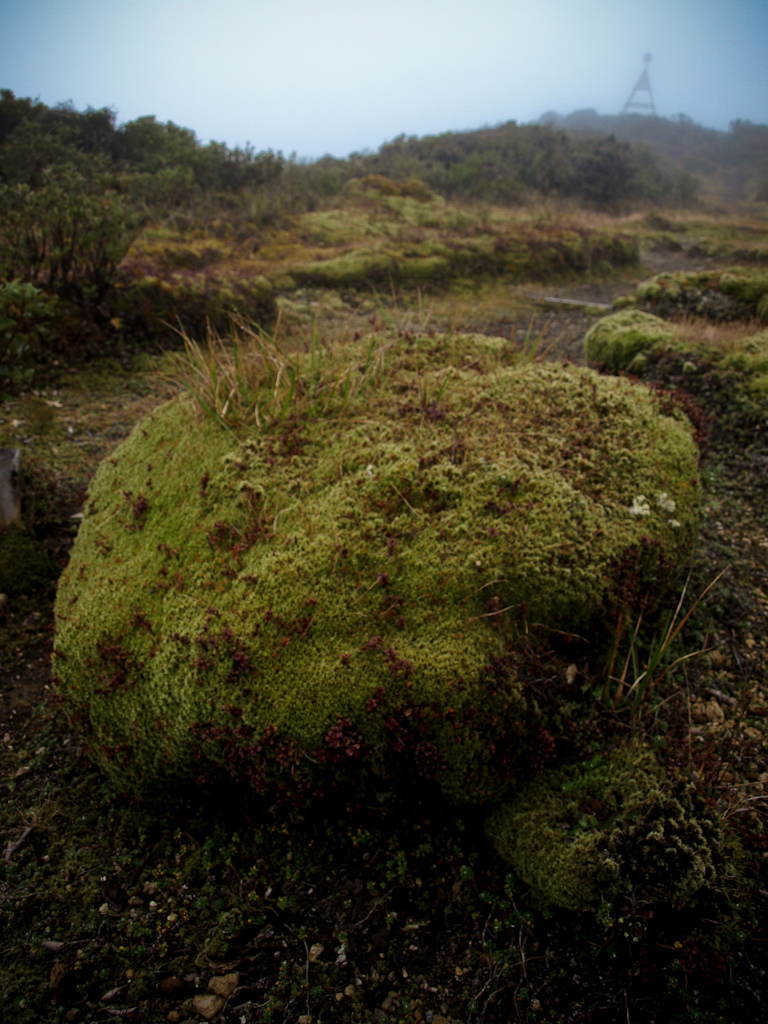
The Pureora forest

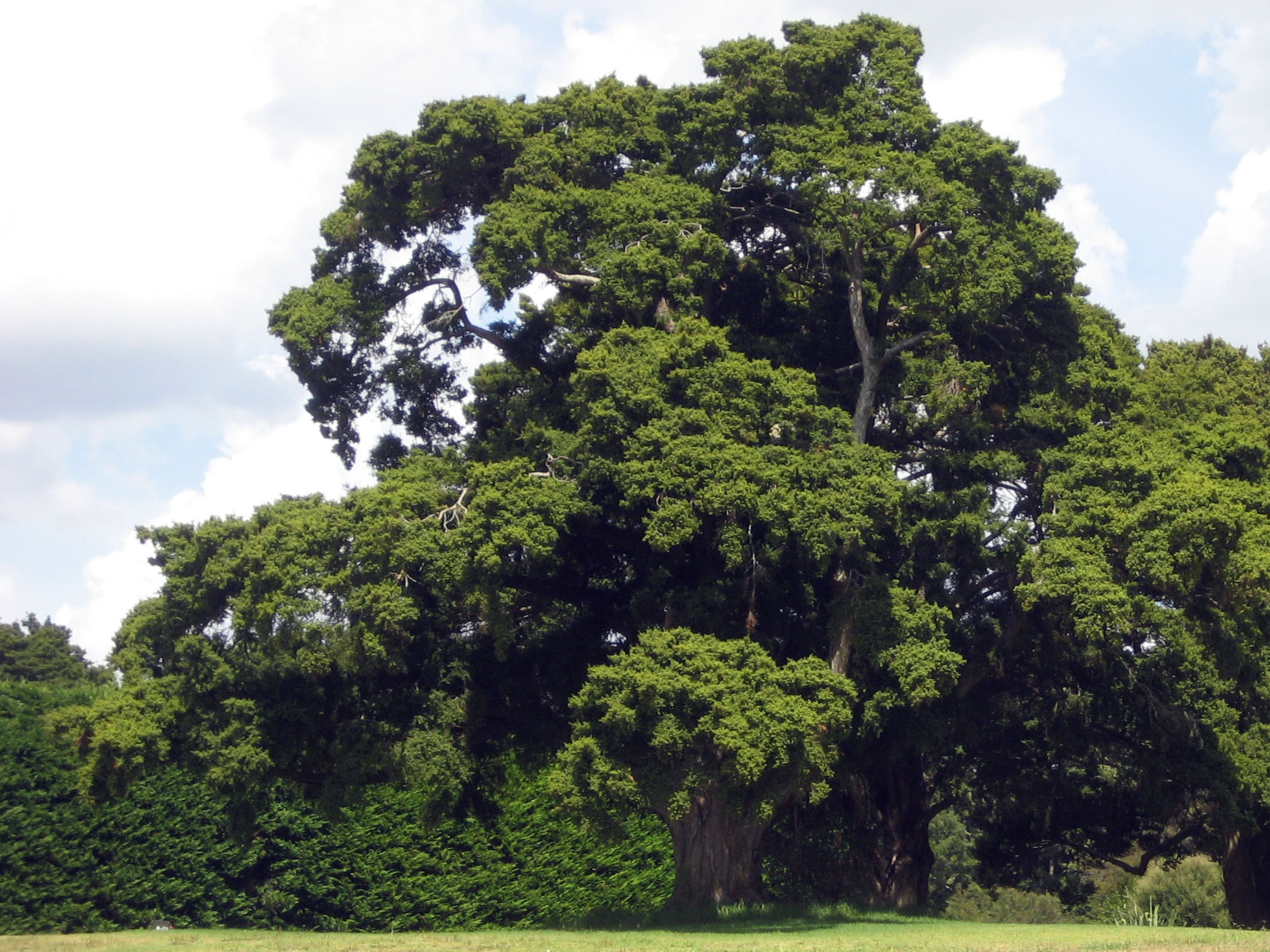
Podocarpus totara found in Pureora Forest Park

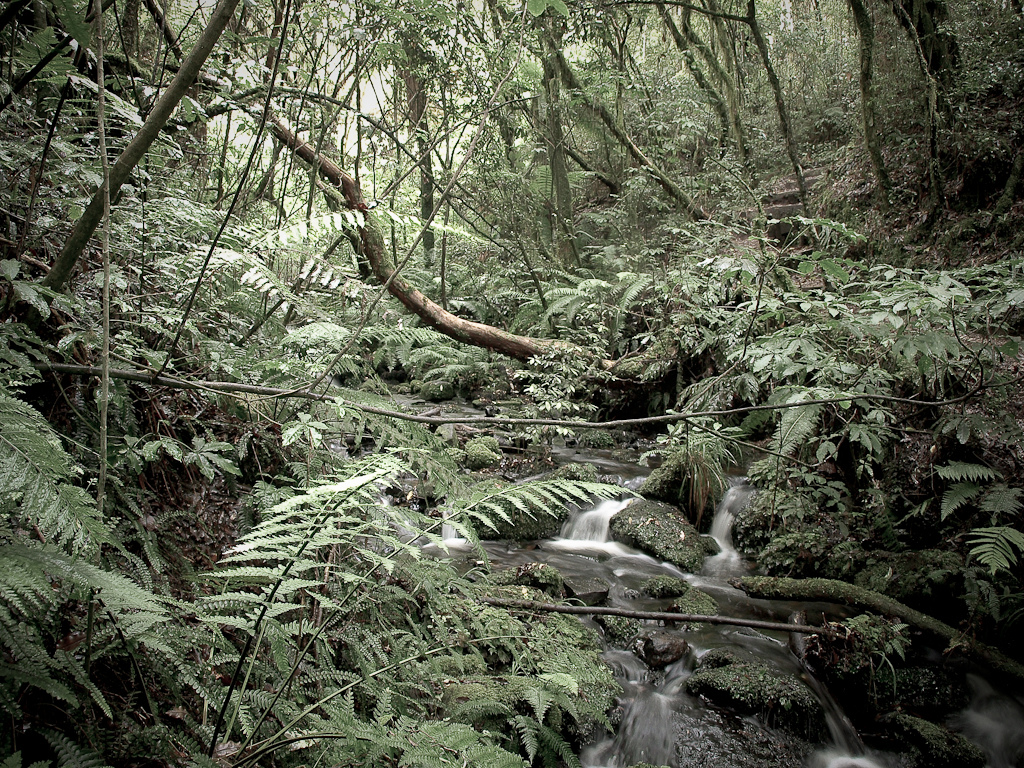
Forests in Pureora

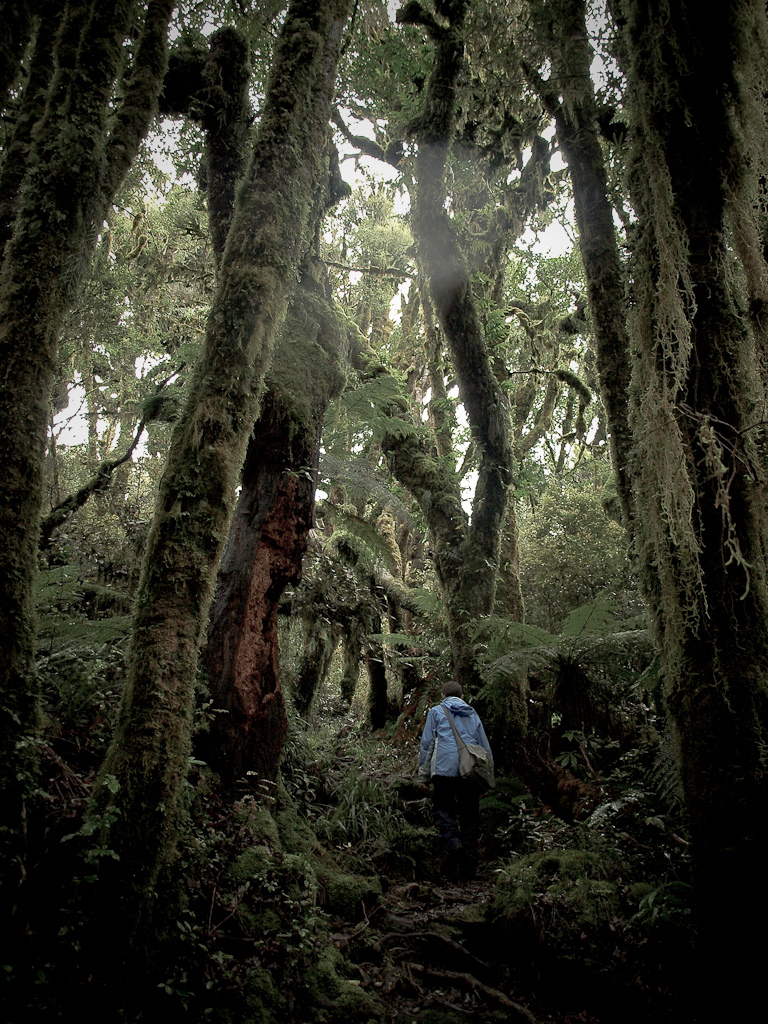
Tall trees in Pureora forest area

== See also ==
- Forest parks of New Zealand
- Conservation in New Zealand
- Tramping in New Zealand
