= List of historic places in Taupō District =

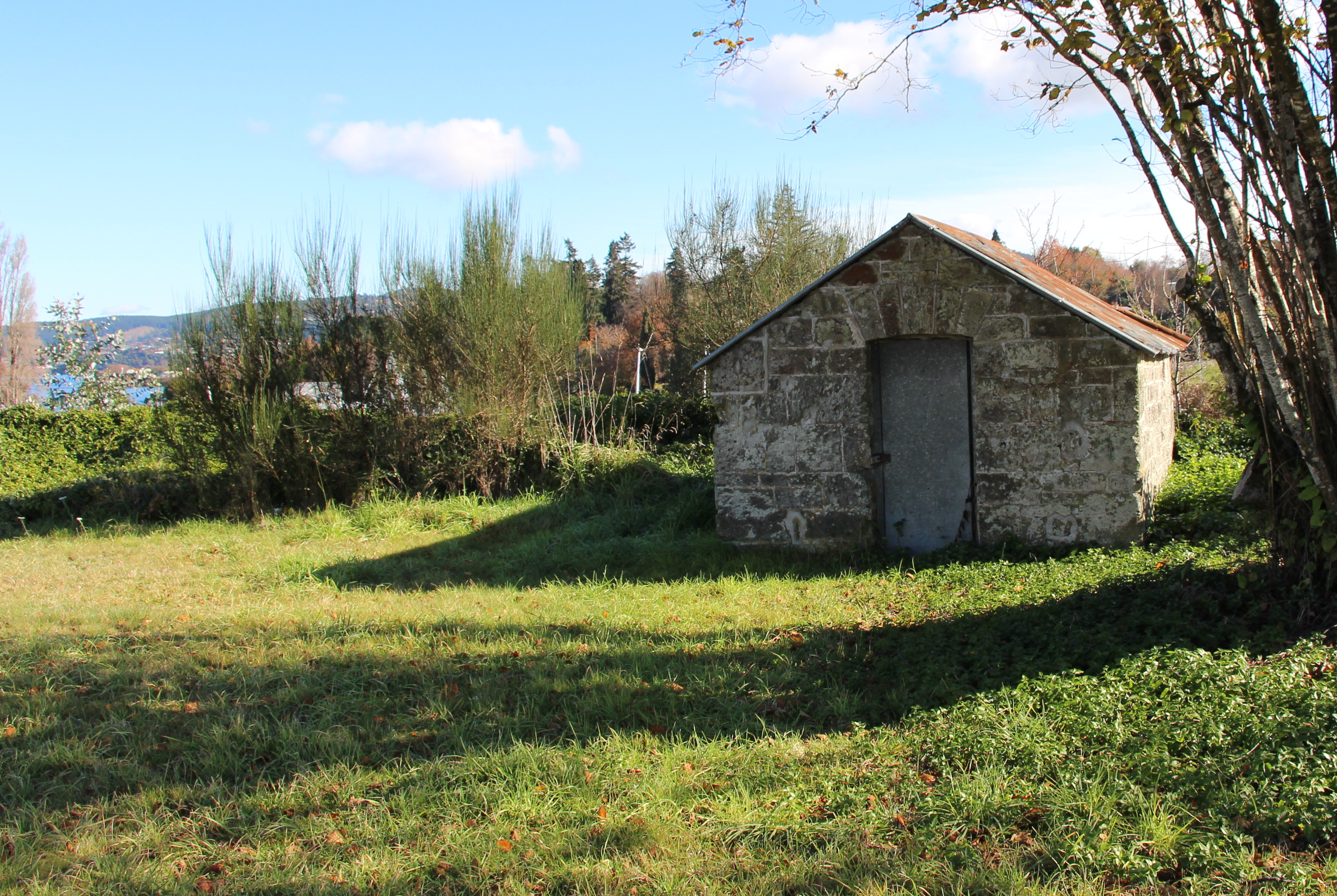
The former New Zealand Armed Constabulary magazine, a Category 2 historic place in Taupō

The Taupō District is a territorial authority in central North Island, New Zealand, primarily in Waikato region. The district center of Taupō is located on the shores of New Zealand's largest lake, the volcanic Lake Taupō. Settled by the Ngāti Tūwharetoa, the region was first seen by Europeans in the 1830s, but was largely unsettled due to its isolated location and a lack of suitable farmland. The New Zealand Armed Constabulary erected a fort (dubbed the Tapuaeharuru Redoubt) at the site during Te Kooti's War in 1869, which later grew into the town of Taupō. The region's geothermal activity has brought extensive tourism to the region since the 1870s.

Heritage New Zealand classification of sites on the New Zealand Heritage List / Rārangi Kōrero, in accordance with the Heritage New Zealand Pouhere Taonga Act 2014, distinguishes between Category 1 ("places of special or outstanding historical or cultural significance") and Category 2 ("places of historic or cultural significance"). Five sites on the list are located in the Taupō District, with two in the town itself.

== Sites ==
Historic sites in Taupō District
Name	Classification	Location	Constructed	Registered	List number	Notes	Image	Ref.
St Werenfried's Church (Catholic)	Category 1	45 Prince of Wales Drive, Waihi Village	1889–1895	2015	943	A timber church building constructed by Mill Hill Missionary John Smiers and John O’Shea over a six-year period and opened on Christmas Day, 1895. Features a corrugated iron roof and a metal-clad spire. Stained glass windows designed by Dutch artist Martin Roestenburg were added in 1957; these show a Māori reimagination of the Madonna and Jesus. Tukutuku paneling was added to the church in the 1970s.		
Magazine (former)	Category 2	23 Story Place, Taupō	1873–1874	2004	942	A small storage house built as a magazine by the New Zealand Armed Constabulary at the Tapuaeharuru Redoubt following Te Kooti's War. Unlike the other (mainly timber) buildings at the redoubt, it was constructed from pumice in order to remain fireproof. It was abandoned in 1885, but restored in the 1960s following historical interest in the site. It was managed by Heritage New Zealand from 1968 to 2019, when the property was transferred to the Ngāti Tūwharetoa.	A small stone building with no windows and a rusted metal roof	
Taupō Courthouse (former)	Category 2	23 Story Place, Taupō	1881	2004	941	One-storey timber building constructed by the New Zealand Armed Constabulary as a meeting hall and Native Land Court courtroom. After the withdrawal of the constabulary in 1885, it was converted into a full-time courthouse. It was replaced by another nearby courthouse in 1962 and moved a short distance; after this, it fell under Heritage New Zealand management and for a period saw use as a youth club meeting hall. Since 1989, it has been used as a Kōhanga reo, providing language immersion in Māori to children.	A single story building in a grassy environment with white walls and a blueish roof	
Waihohonu Hut	Category 1	Tongariro National Park	1903–1904	1993	7098	A two-roomed timber-framed hut with corrugated iron sheathing and pumice insulation. It was built by the Department of Tourist and Health Resorts in 1903–1904 as the first recreational mountain hut in Tongariro National Park, New Zealand's oldest national park. It is the oldest surviving recreational mountain hut in New Zealand. Although tourist use declined in 1908 with the construction of the North Island Main Trunk, it became a base point for access to Mount Ruapehu by the Ruapehu Ski Club, the country's first ski club. A new hut was constructed in 1968, although the old building continued to be used until overnight stays were discouraged by park management in 1979.	A bright red hiking shelter in a forested environment	
Canoe Site	Category 2	Pureora Forest Park	-	1987	6311	Privately owned site of Māori significance.		
