= Stephen King (conservationist) =

New Zealand conservationist (born 1950s)

- Born: Stephen Tamatea King; 1952 or 1953 (age 72–73); Te Aroha, New Zealand
- Organization: Native Forest Restoration Trust
- Known for: Treesitting and conservation activism

Stephen Tamatea King (born 1952/1953) is a New Zealand botanist and conservationist, known for his barefoot campaigns to protect native forests.

King gained national prominence in 1978 for his campaigns to protect native forests from logging, after leading the world's first treesitting protest on an ancient tōtara tree. He went on to serve as chairman of the Native Forest Restoration Trust, which he helped establish in 1980.

== Early life and education ==
King was born in 1952 or 1953 and was the third oldest of 12 children. He grew up in Te Aroha, before the family moved to Northcote, Auckland, in 1960. His father fostered his love of nature from a young age, and as an early teenager he earned himself the nickname "nature boy".

King attended Westlake Boys' High School. At 15, he became a registered nurseryman, propagating native plants from seeds and recording their growth in detailed notes. In his late teens, he began receiving invitations from other schools to speak to students about conservation. In 1970, at 17, he won the inaugural Young Conservator of the Year award.

After high school, King studied horticulture at Massey University for two years, before dropping out to study at Bible College in Christchurch. Six months later, King was expelled from the college for refusing to wear shoes.

King left Christchurch, and walked barefoot to the top of the South Island, crossed the Cook Strait via ferry, and then walked as far as Ōtaki, before hitchhiking the rest of his way back to Auckland.

== Conservation work ==
In 1971, the government, led by prime minister Robert Muldoon, proposed to mill significant areas of native beech forests, and replace it with non-native Pinus radiata. King served as the Auckland branch chairperson at the Native Forest Action Council (NAFC). In 1975, the NAFC began a petition, titled the Maruia Declaration, to demand legal protection for native forests. King led a team of campaigners in Auckland, door-knocking every home in Muldoon's electorate to collect signatures for the petition. The petition obtained 341,000 signatures and was submitted to parliament in 1977, resulting in protections for native forests in the West Coast.

King made headlines in 1978, as part of a group of protesters that spent a week staying on a tōtara tree, in protest of the felling of thousand-year old trees in what is now the Pureora Forest Park. On 18 January the protesters started climbing and occupying trees following an anti-logging protest involving a hundred people, and after logging was suspended on 21 January for safety reasons, an indefinite hold was placed on 24 January. A full logging ban was introduced three years later.

Following the protest, King and Shirley Guildford, another protester, devised a plan to renew the native forest; the Forestry Service agreed to make a failed pine plantation in Pureora available to them to experiment with. They set up a nursery and began propagating seeds from tōtara, kahikatea and matai trees. In 1980, they established the Native Forest Restoration Trust, with support from Sir Edmund Hillary as its patron. By 1981, the trust had collected over a million seeds, and propagated 500,000 seedlings in their nursery; by 1984 the trust had planted 25,000 native trees in Pureora alone.

In January 1988, King lead another group of protesters from the trust, along with English botanist David Bellamy, and climbed the same tōtara he had occupied ten years prior. The trust were protesting a decision by the government to sell four blocks (7000 ha) of land to the Forest Corporation, rather than vesting it in the Department of Conservation. The trust said the land, which had been milled of native forest and planted with pine a decade earlier, was key to reconnecting parts of the forest that had been split. In October 1990, Prime Minister Mike Moore announced that Pureora would be restored as a native forest.

In January 2000, on the 21st anniversary of his initial protest, King again climbed one of the tōtara trees in Pureora and released three carrier pigeons – one with a key attached to its leg – to send a symbolic message to the government that setting up a trust was "key" to managing the forest's future.

King has been involved in the protection of kauri trees in the Northland Peninsula. King is also one of the patrons of the New Zealand Trust for Conservation Volunteers.

== Personal life ==
King has notably spent the majority of his life barefoot, stating he "loves the feeling of papatūānuku (Note: A figure in Māori mythology who represents the land.) beneath his feet".

King was sentenced to four months' community detention in 2010 for possession of objectionable images, including child pornography.
