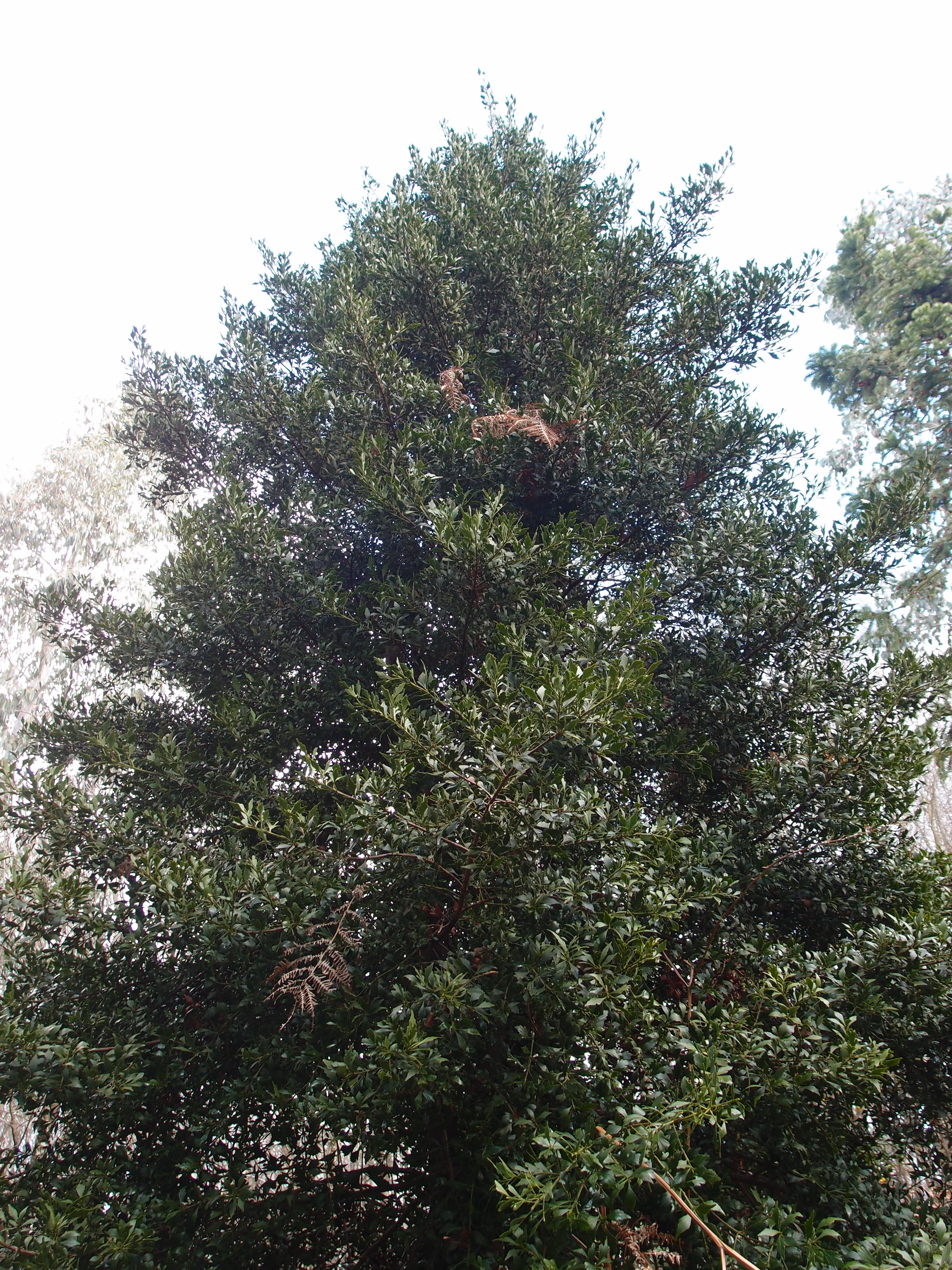

Conservation status
- Least Concern (IUCN 3.1)

Scientific classification
- Kingdom: Plantae
- Clade: Tracheophytes
- Clade: Gymnosperms
- Division: Pinophyta
- Class: Pinopsida
- Order: Araucariales
- Family: Podocarpaceae
- Genus: Phyllocladus
- Species: P. aspleniifolius

Binomial name
- Phyllocladus aspleniifolius (Labill.) Hook.f.

Synonyms
- Brownetera aspleniifolia (Labill.) Tratt.; Phyllocladus billardierei Mirb., nom. illeg. superfl.; Phyllocladus glaucus Carrière; Phyllocladus rhomboidalis Rich.; Phyllocladus serratifolius Nois. ex Henkel & Hochst.; Phyllocladus trichomanoides var. glaucus (Carrière) Parl.; Podocarpus aspleniifolius Labill.; Thalamia aspleniifolia (Labill.) Spreng.

= Phyllocladus aspleniifolius =

Species of conifer

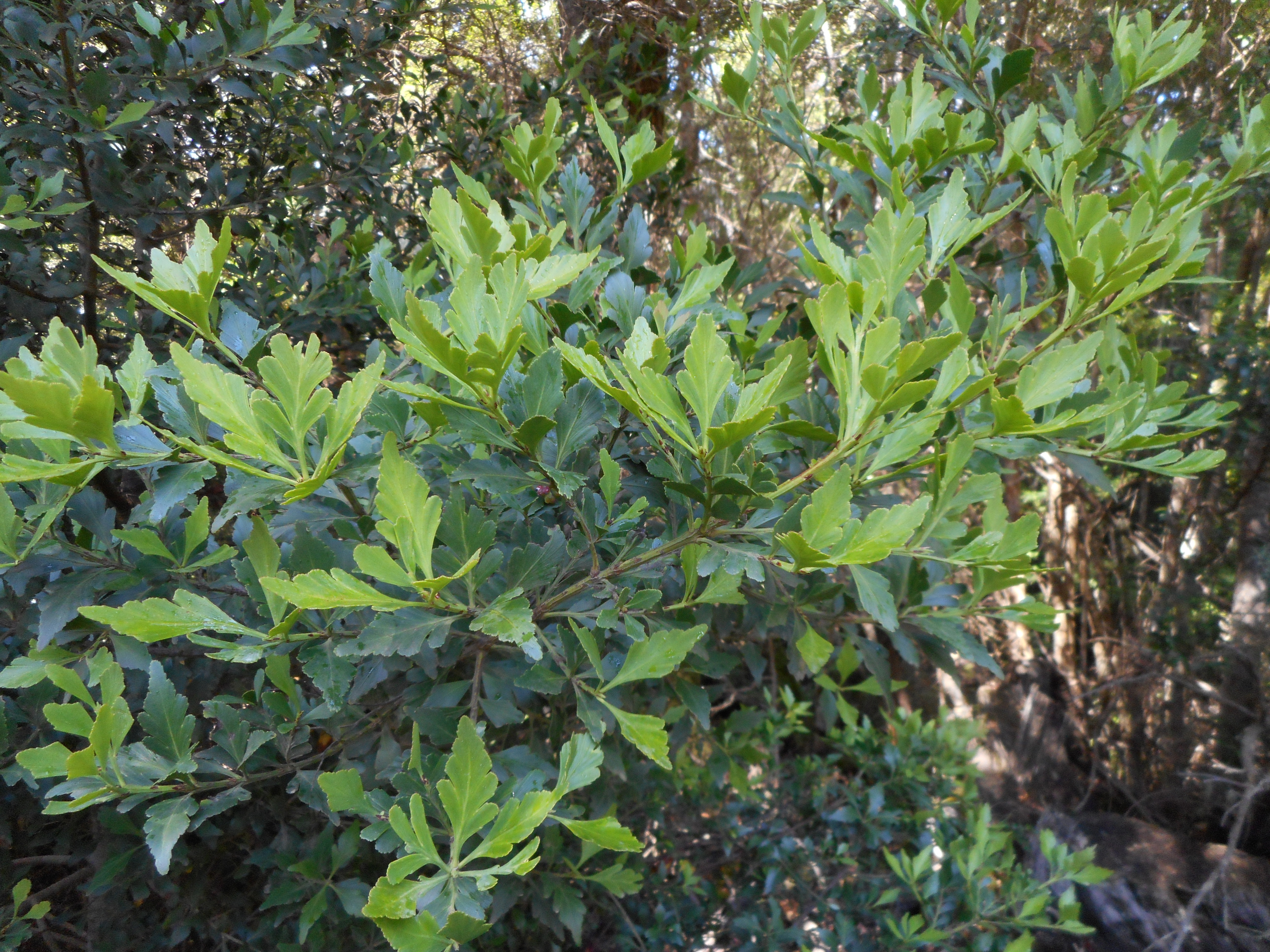
Phyllocladus aspeniifolius

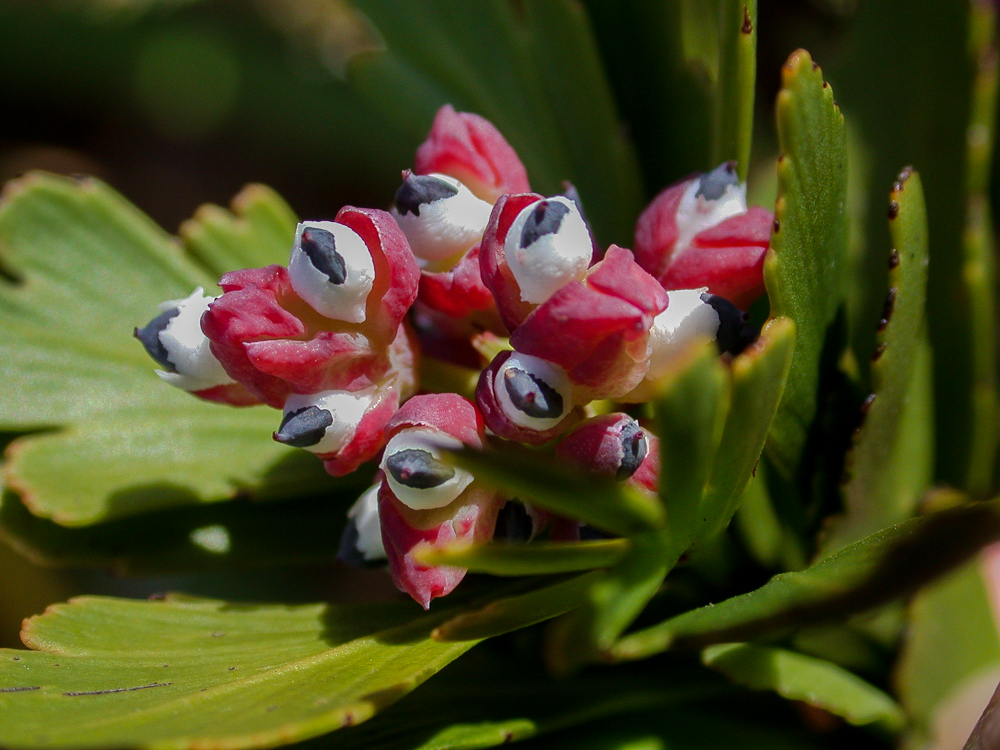
Female cones of Phyllocladus aspleniifolius

Phyllocladus aspleniifolius, the celerytop pine, is a species of coniferous tree in the family Podocarpaceae, endemic to Tasmania, Australia. It is widespread and common in Tasmania, with the most abundance in the western highlands. Its leaves appear similar to those of a celery plant, hence the common name.

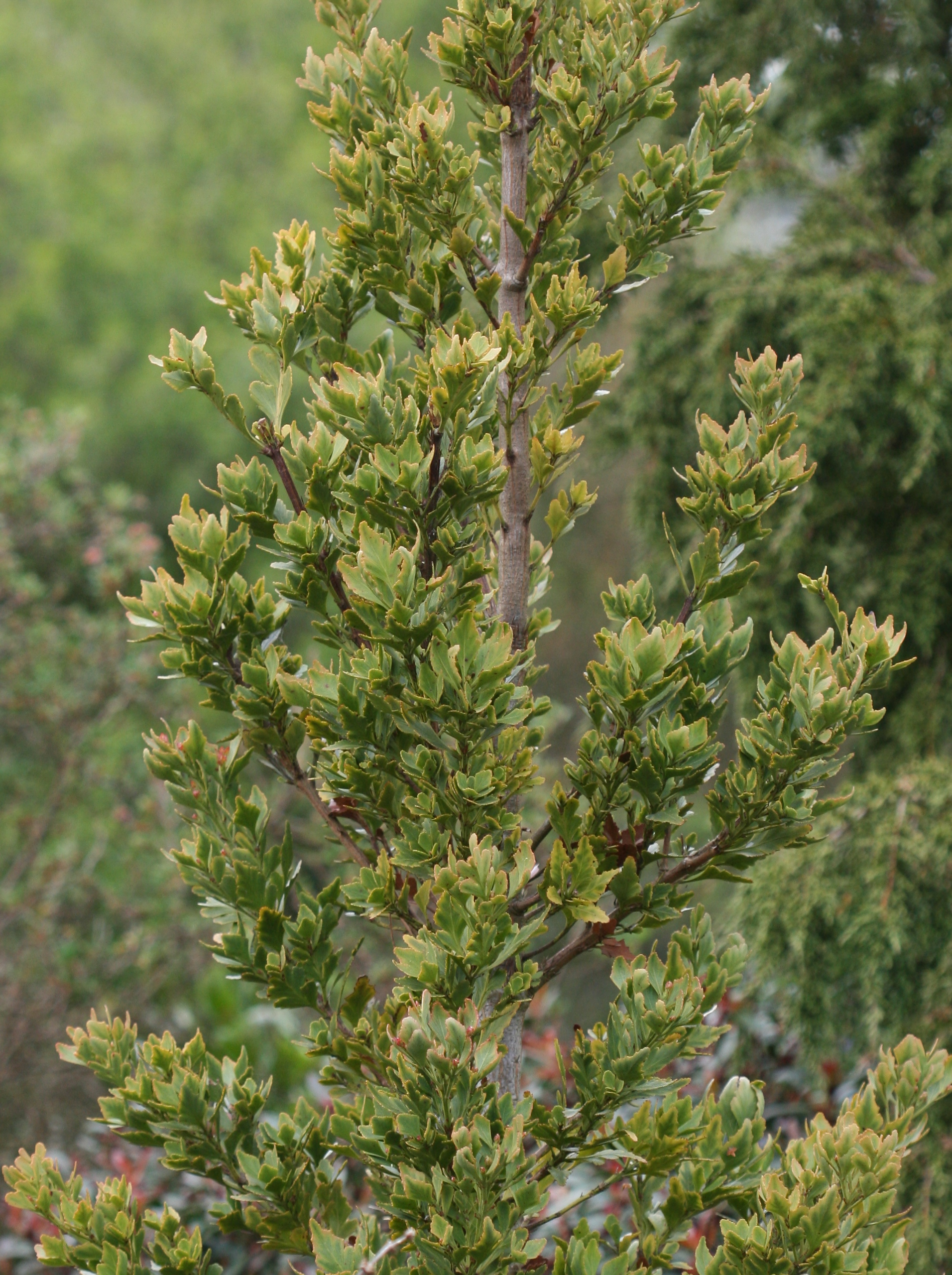
Phyllocladus aspleniifolius

== Description ==
Phyllocladus aspleniifolius is a large, conical conifer in the family Podocarpaceae. The trunk is erect with horizontal branches. True leaves appear at the seedling stage and are fine and needle-like. Mature leaves are reduced to minute, brown scales. The function of the leaf is taken over by cladodes that look like green diamond shaped leaves, similar to the leaves of a celery plant, hence the common name "celery-top pine". The cladodes are thick and flattened, 3–8 cm long borne spirally on green stems. The plant may bear male and female cones on the same tree or separate trees in summer. The male cones are cylindrical, 3–5 mm long, with 2-3 together at the end of side branches. Female cones occur in groups of 3–4 in short, stalked clusters at the axils or margins of the cladodes. Mature cones are a distinct fleshy pink to red, with a white aril holding a hard, black, exposed seed.

== Habitat and distribution ==
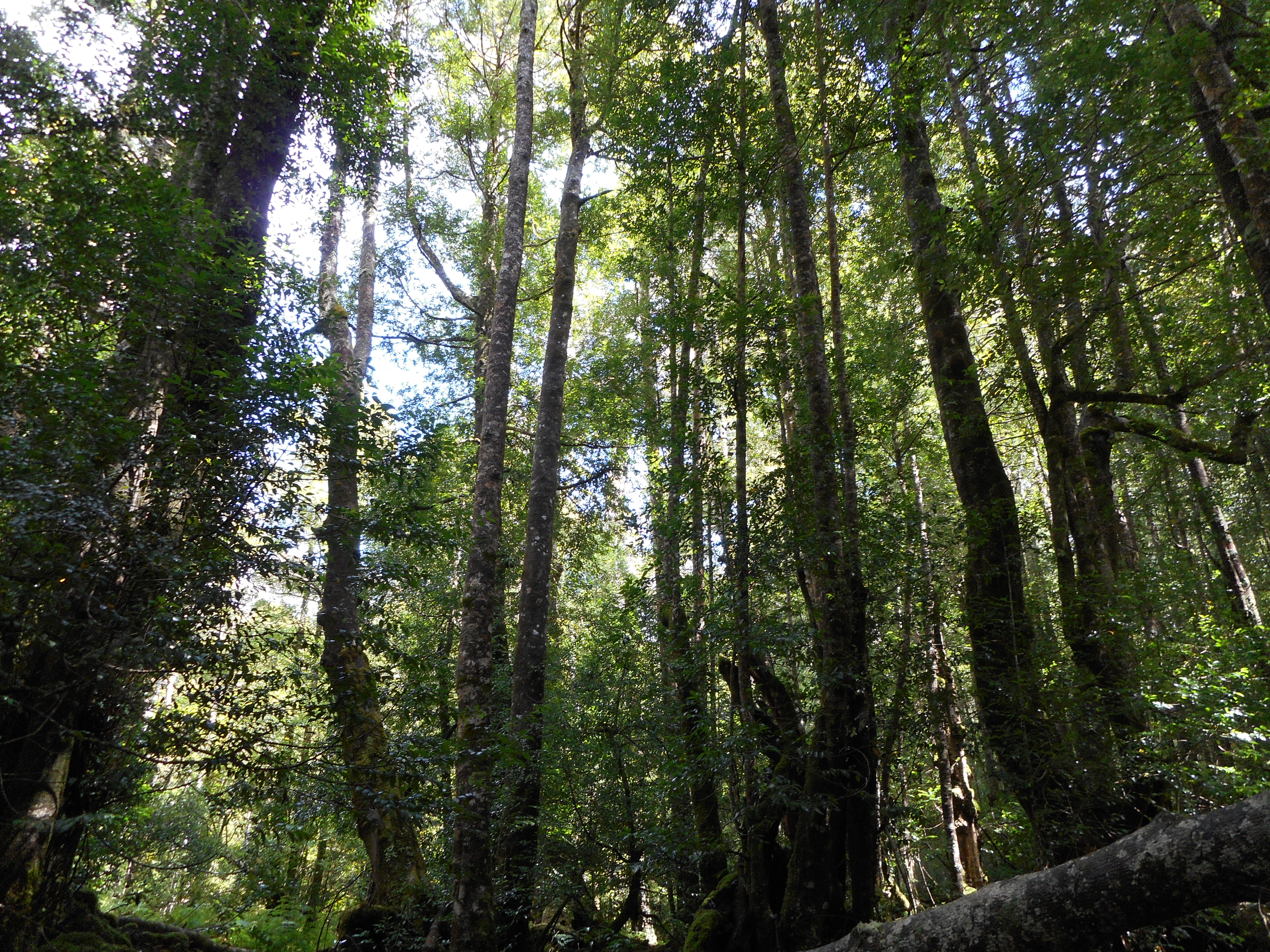
Typical wet sclerophyll forest in Mt Field National Park, Tasmania, where Phyllocladus aspleniifolius is found.

Phyllocladus aspeniifolius is endemic to Tasmania and is the most widespread and abundant conifer in Tasmania. Commonly found in wet sclerophyll forest and rainforest, from sea level to 1200m in the west and south west of the state. It will grow in all suitable habitat in Tasmania, and can also be found in smaller populations in the north and east, and as a stunted shrub in the higher elevation areas.

Phyllocladus aspleniifolius is a common constituent of cool temperate rainforest vegetation types in Tasmania. When found with other rainforest species such as Nothofagus cunninghamii, Atherosperma moschatum, and Eucryphia lucida, the vegetation type can be defined as rainforest. Phyllocladus aspleniifolius dominates in rainforests with poorer soils, whereas Nothofagus cunninghamii dominates rainforests on good soil types. The largest Phyllocladus aspeniifolius are found in wet sclerophyll forests with a canopy of Eucalyptus spp, and can be up to 800 years old. They grow on acidic soils derived from dolerite, granite or quartzite, that is well drained and may be on boulder or scree slopes, in high rainfall areas with no marked periods of drought. They are less shade tolerant than their fellow rainforest species, relying on a higher fire frequency for regeneration in these areas and regenerate freely in burnt forests.

== Uses ==
The wood of this species is highly prized by fine furniture makers and wooden boat builders. It grows to form a medium size tree in the forests at middle elevations. The wood of good sized trees is straight grained and dense, golden brown, and not dissimilar to yew (Taxus). It is considered a high value and speciality species by the timber industry. The wood is hard and strong with little shrinkage, bends and works well, and is very durable. The wood is used for railway sleepers, flooring, ship masts, furniture, and cabinet work.

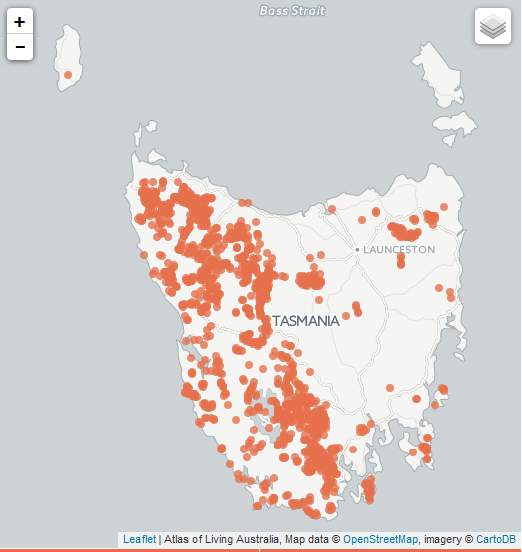
Distribution of Phyllocladus aspleniffolius from Atlas of Living Australia

It makes an attractive container plant, but is slow growing, and prefers cool, moist, acidic soil indicating it needs constant moisture in containers. Therefore, this species is rare in cultivation, and is limited to botanic gardens and arboreta and a few private gardens.

It has also been used to investigate climate change. Phyllocladus aspleniifolius grows on a wide range of sites and appears sensitive to climate conditions, therefore its pattern of ring width and wood density are used to research past climate.

== Threats and conservation ==
The largest threat to Phyllocladus aspleniifolius is logging for its high value timber and presence in the wet sclerophyll forests that are subject to clearfell harvesting practices. A large portion of the species is located in protected forests in Tasmania or in forests open to logging with management that allows for the persistence of native trees. The IUCN Red List, therefore lists the species as "Least Concern", indicating its persistent abundance in Tasmania.
