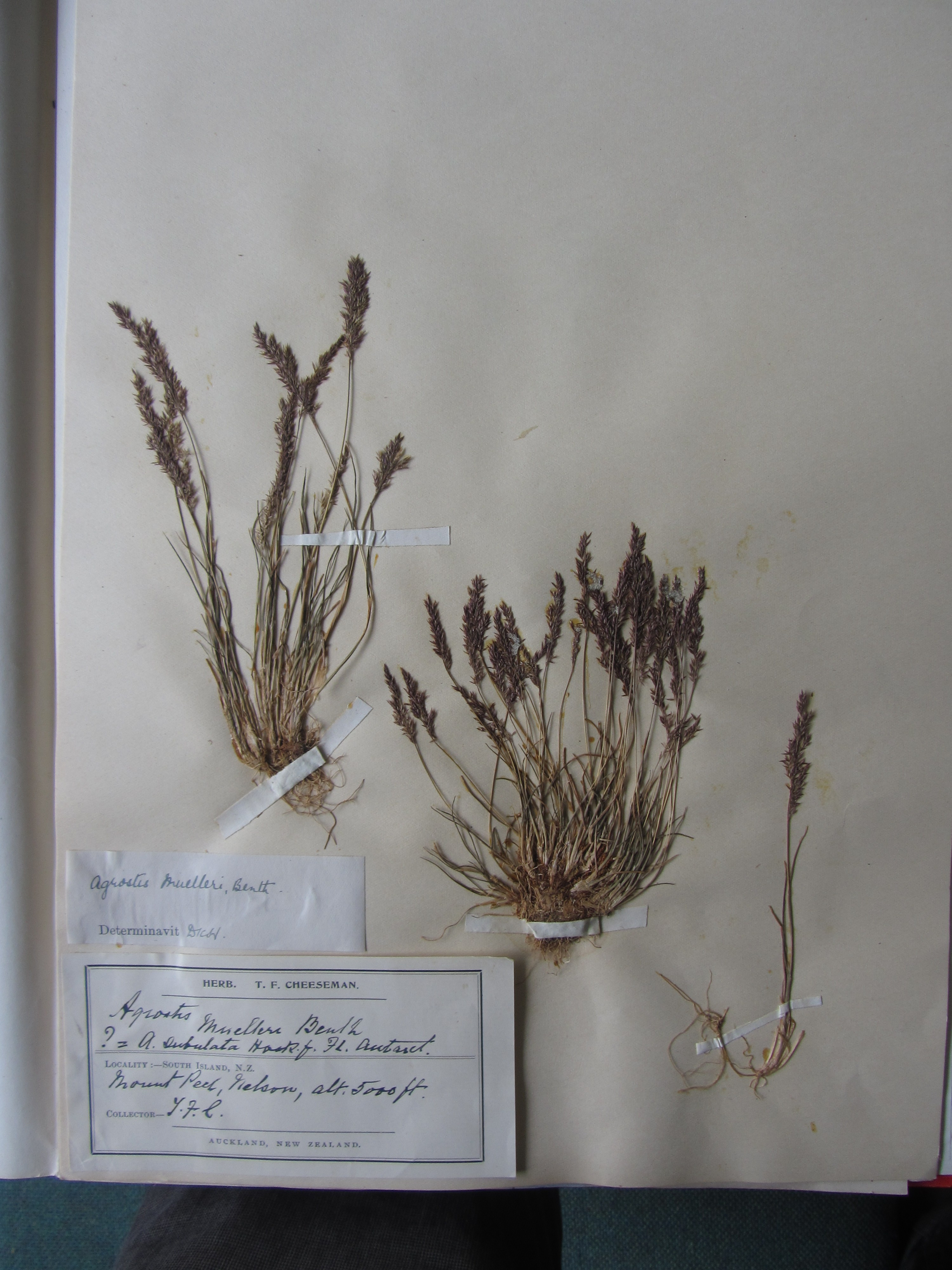

Scientific classification
- Kingdom: Plantae
- Clade: Tracheophytes
- Clade: Angiosperms
- Clade: Monocots
- Clade: Commelinids
- Order: Poales
- Family: Poaceae
- Subfamily: Pooideae
- Genus: Agrostis
- Species: A. muelleriana

Binomial name
- Agrostis muelleriana Vickery

= Agrostis muelleriana =

Species of plant

Agrostis muelleriana is a species of true grass in the tribe Poeae. It is native to New Zealand and Australia.

== Description ==
Agrostis muelleriana is a dense, slender, erect, dull-green, tufted grass with 3-3.5mm spikelets bearing 1 floret. It is described as an annual in New South Wales and a perennial in New Zealand.

== Distribution ==
Agrostis muelleriana is native to New Zealand and Australia (New South Wales, Tasmania, and Victoria).

In New Zealand, it is very local in the North Island, with only two records on Ruapehu and one on the Pureora summit, but is common throughout the South Island mountains.

In Australia, it is found in high alpine areas of New South Wales, Victoria, and Tasmania.

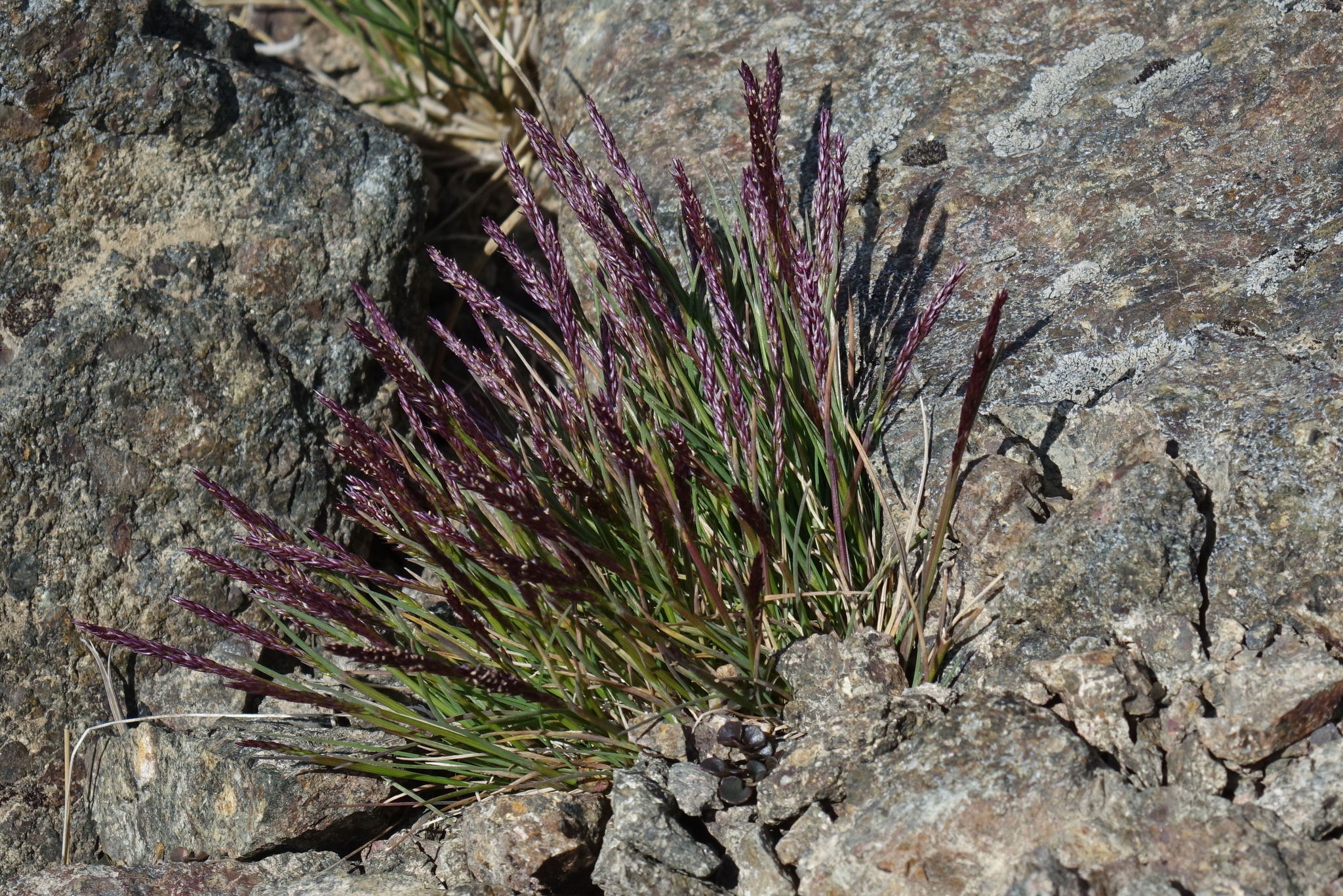
A. muelleriana from distance
