= Phylloflavan =

Names
- IUPAC name (2R,3S)-3′,4′,5,7-Tetrahydroxyflavan-3-yl (3S)-5-(3,4-dihydroxyphenyl)-3-hydroxypentanoate
- Systematic IUPAC name (2R,3S)-2-(3,4-Dihydroxyphenyl)-5,7-dihydroxy-3,4-dihydro-2H-1-benzopyran-3-yl (3S)-5-(3,4-dihydroxyphenyl)-3-hydroxypentanoate
- Other names ent-epicatechin-3-δ-(3,4-dihydroxyphenyl)-β-hydroxypentanoate

Identifiers
CAS Number	98570-83-3
3D model (JSmol)	Interactive image
ChemSpider	402967
PubChem CID	457885
UNII	9T7A4KA6YL
CompTox Dashboard (EPA)	DTXSID30243721
- InChI: InChI=1S/C26H26O10/c27-15(4-1-13-2-5-18(29)21(32)7-13)11-25(34)35-24-12-17-20(31)9-16(28)10-23(17)36-26(24)14-3-6-19(30)22(33)8-14/h2-3,5-10,15,24,26-33H,1,4,11-12H2/t15-,24-,26+/m0/s1 Key: FKDRTLFRRHQTGU-TYFWRAIDSA-N
- SMILES: C1C(C(OC2=CC(=CC(=C21)O)O)C3=CC(=C(C=C3)O)O)OC(=O)CC(CCC4=CC(=C(C=C4)O)O)O

Properties
Chemical formula	C_{26}H_{26}O_{10}
Molar mass	498.47 g/mol
- Except where otherwise noted, data are given for materials in their standard state (at 25 °C [77 °F], 100 kPa). Infobox references

Phylloflavan is a phenolic resin compound found in the New Zealand Podocarpaceae Phyllocladus alpinus.
