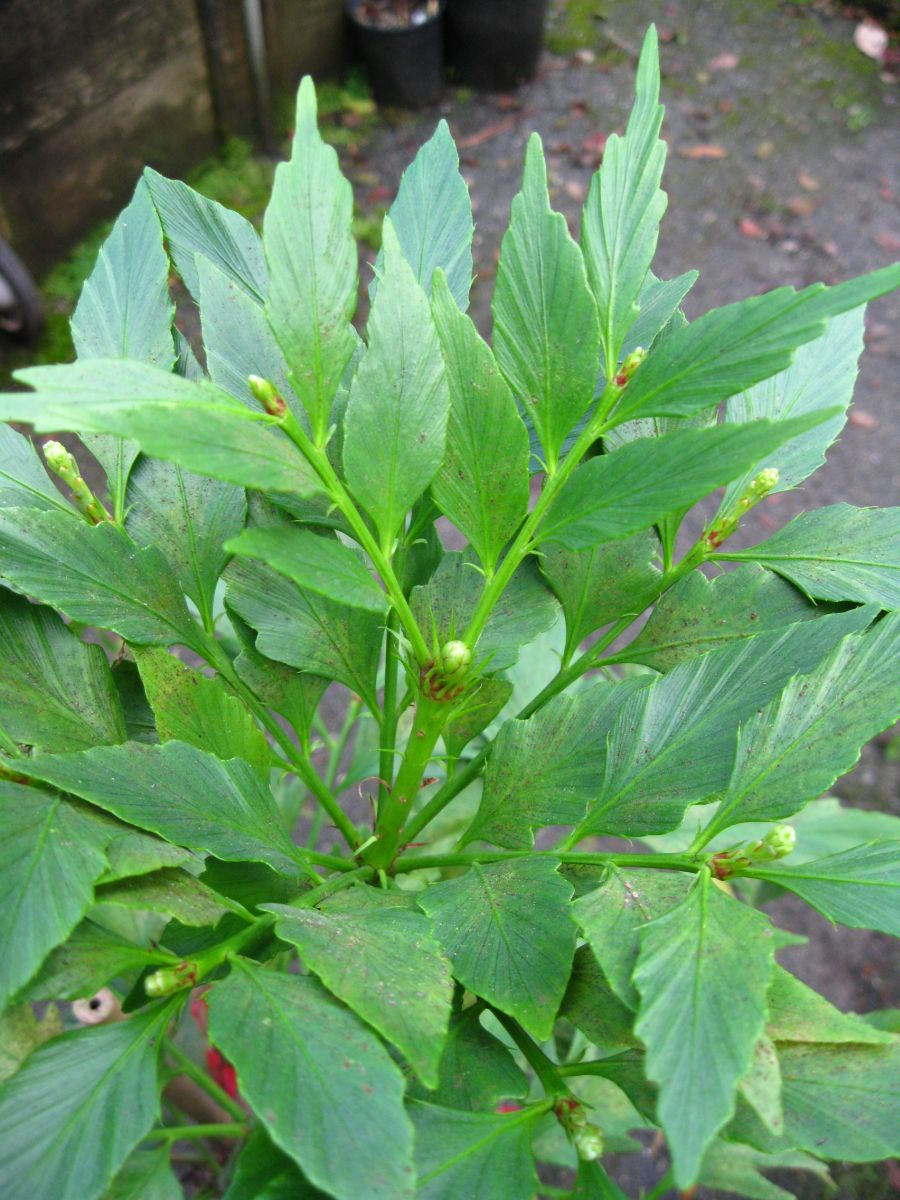

Conservation status
- Least Concern (IUCN 3.1)

Scientific classification
- Kingdom: Plantae
- Clade: Tracheophytes
- Clade: Gymnosperms
- Division: Pinophyta
- Class: Pinopsida
- Order: Araucariales
- Family: Podocarpaceae
- Genus: Phyllocladus
- Species: P. hypophyllus

Binomial name
- Phyllocladus hypophyllus Hook.f. (1852)

Synonyms
- Phyllocladus hypophyllus var. protractus Warb. (1900); Phyllocladus major Pilg. (1916); Phyllocladus protractus (Warb.) Pilg. (1903); Podocarpus hypophyllus (Hook.f.) Kuntze (1891)

= Phyllocladus hypophyllus =

Species of conifer

Phyllocladus hypophyllus is a species of conifer in the family Podocarpaceae. It is a tree native to Borneo (Brunei, Indonesia, and Malaysia), Sulawesi and the Maluku Islands (Indonesia), the Philippines, and New Guinea (Indonesia and Papua New Guinea).

Phyllocladus hypophyllus grows in tropical evergreen hill, montane, and subalpine rainforests from (310) 600 to 3,400 (4,000) meters elevation. At lower elevations it grows as a large canopy tree, in mixed broadleaf-conifer forests with species of Podocarpaceae, Fagaceae, and Lauraceae, and in kerangas forests on white sandstone-derived and nutrient-poor sand with other conifers including Agathis. In upper montane cloud forest or 'mossy' forest it grows up to 20 meters high, forming part of the low canopy with other conifers (Dacrydium sp., Dacrycarpus sp., and Podocarpus sp.) and broadleaf trees, which are covered with epiphytes including ferns and mosses. In New Guinea it often grows in montane forests dominated by the broadleaf tree Nothofagus grandis with P. hypophyllus and other podocarps mixed in. In high-elevation subalpine forests it grows in shrubby or dwarfed form, often at the edges of boggy grasslands, especially in New Guinea, and on rocky ridges. It grows on diverse substrates, including granite, sandstone, peaty soils, ultramafic soils derived from serpentinite and similar rocks, volcanic deposits, and eroded limestone.
