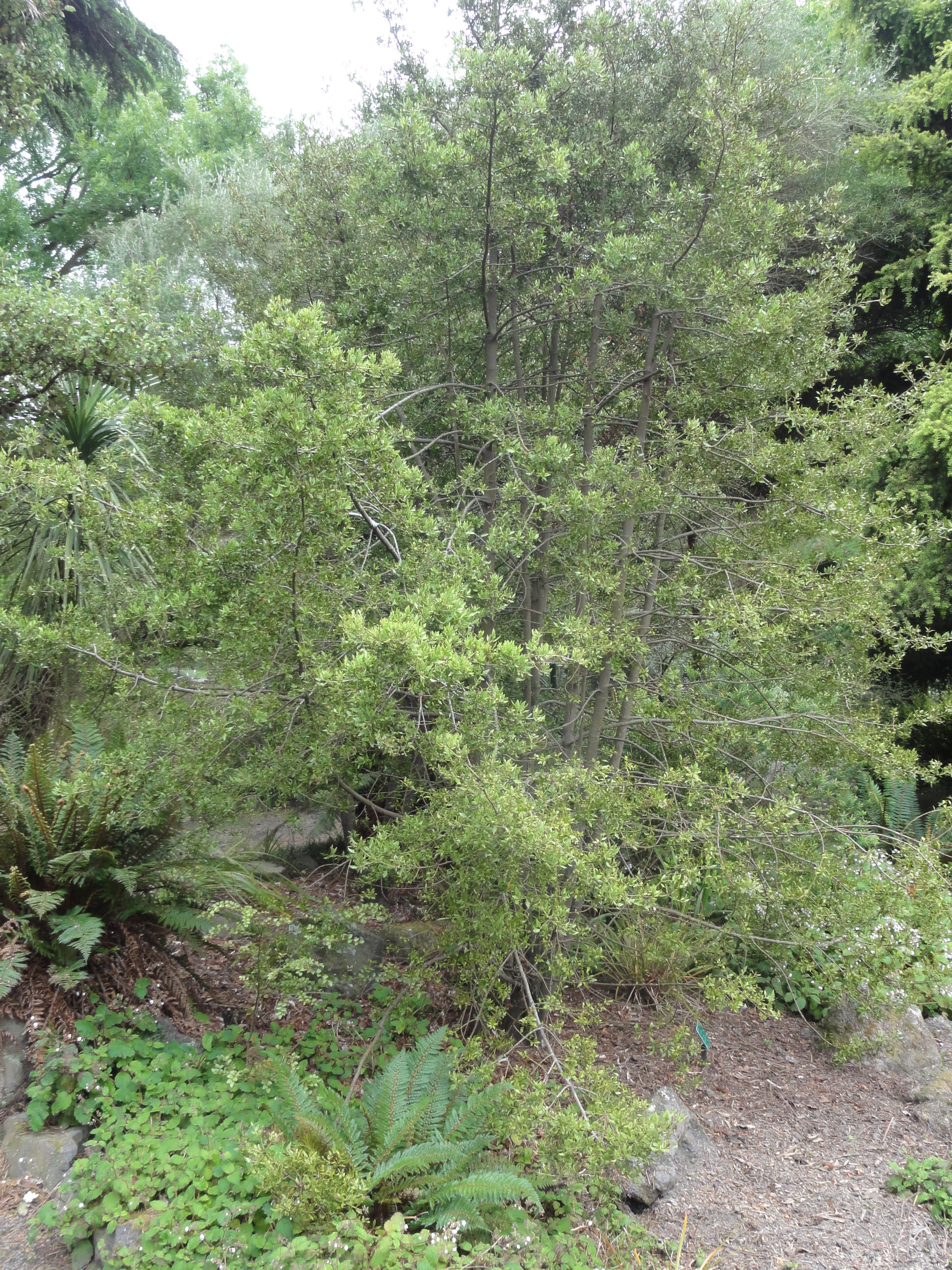
- Phyllocladus alpinus

Scientific classification
- Kingdom: Plantae
- Clade: Embryophytes
- Clade: Tracheophytes
- Clade: Spermatophytes
- Clade: Gymnosperms
- Division: Pinophyta
- Class: Pinopsida
- Order: Araucariales
- Family: Podocarpaceae
- Genus: Phyllocladus; Rich. ex Mirb.

Type species
- Phyllocladus billardieri Richard ex de Mirbel

Species
- Five; see text

Synonyms
- Brownetera Richard ex Trattinnick; Robertia Richard ex Carrière; Thalamia Sprengel

= Phyllocladus =

Genus of plants

Phyllocladus, the celery pines, is a small genus of conifers, now usually placed in the family Podocarpaceae. Species occur mainly in New Zealand, Tasmania, and Malesia in the Southern Hemisphere, though P. hypophyllus ranges into the Philippines, a short way north of the equator.

== Characteristics ==
They are small to medium-sized trees, reaching 10–30 m tall, or sometimes small shrubs. The main structural shoots are green for 2–3 years, then turn brown as the bark thickens. The leaves are sparse, tiny, scale-like, 2–3 mm long, and only green (photosynthetic) for a short time, soon turning brown. Most photosynthesis is performed by highly modified, leaf-like short shoots called phylloclades; these develop in the axils of the scale leaves, and are simple or compound (depending on species). Simple phylloclades are rhombic, 2–5 cm long, and compound phylloclades are up to 20 cm long and subdivided into five to 15 leaflet-like phylloclades 1–3 cm long. The seed cones are berry-like, similar to those of several other Podocarpaceae genera, notably Halocarpus and Prumnopitys, with a fleshy white aril; the seeds are dispersed by birds, which digest the soft, fleshy aril as they pass the hard seeds in their droppings.

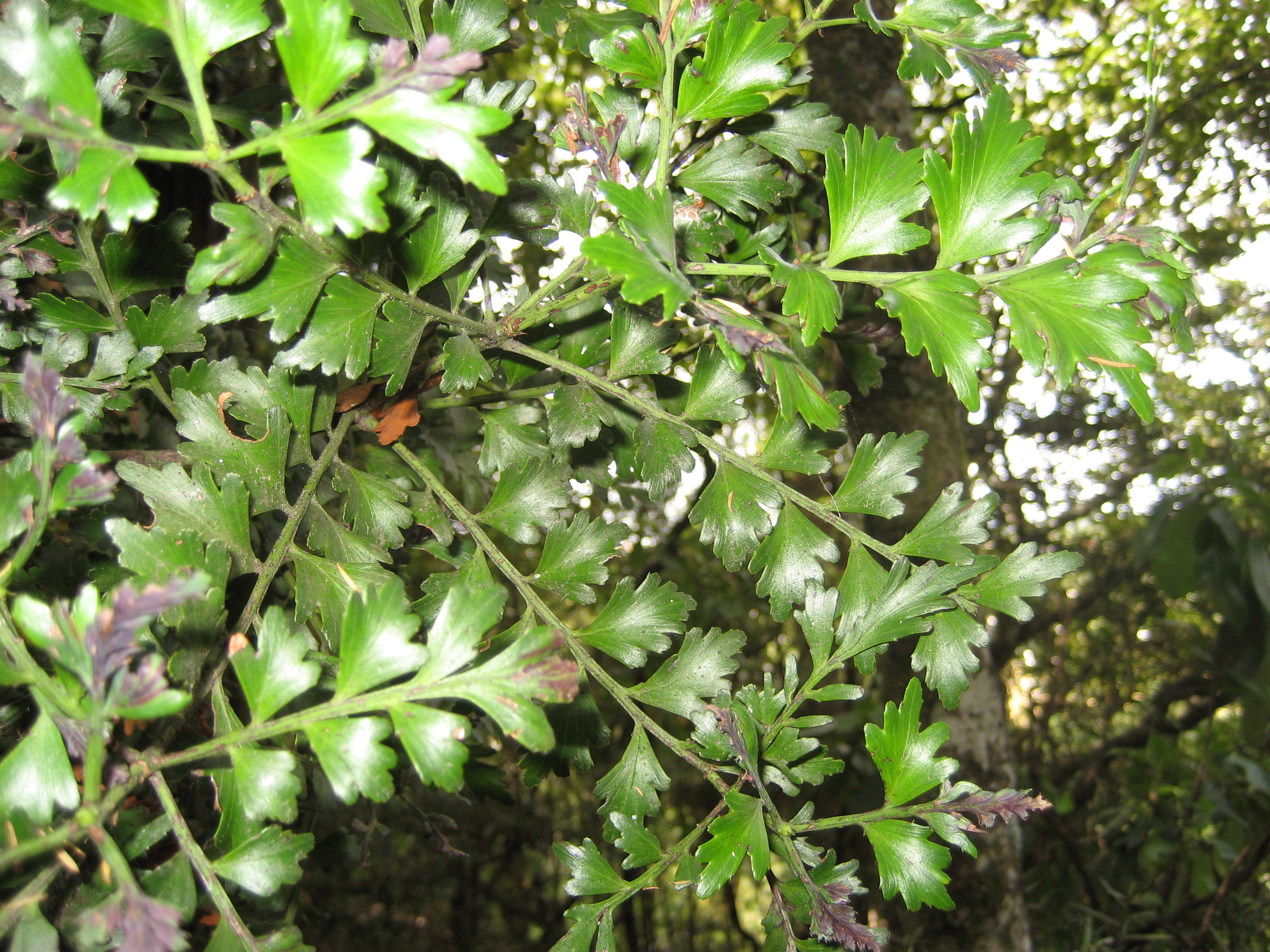
Phylloclades of P. trichomanoides

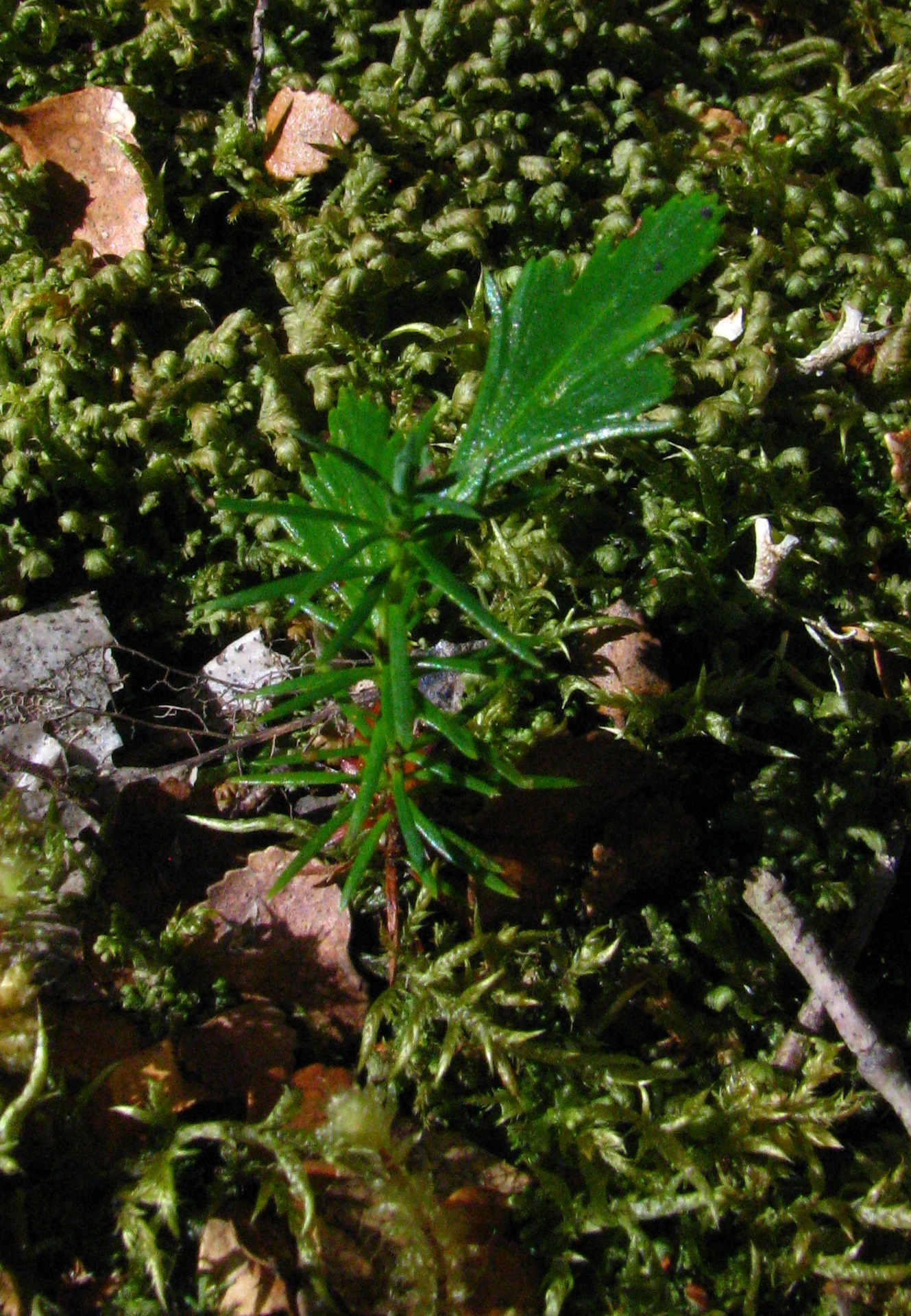
A seedling of P. aspleniifolius with needle-like juvenile leaves

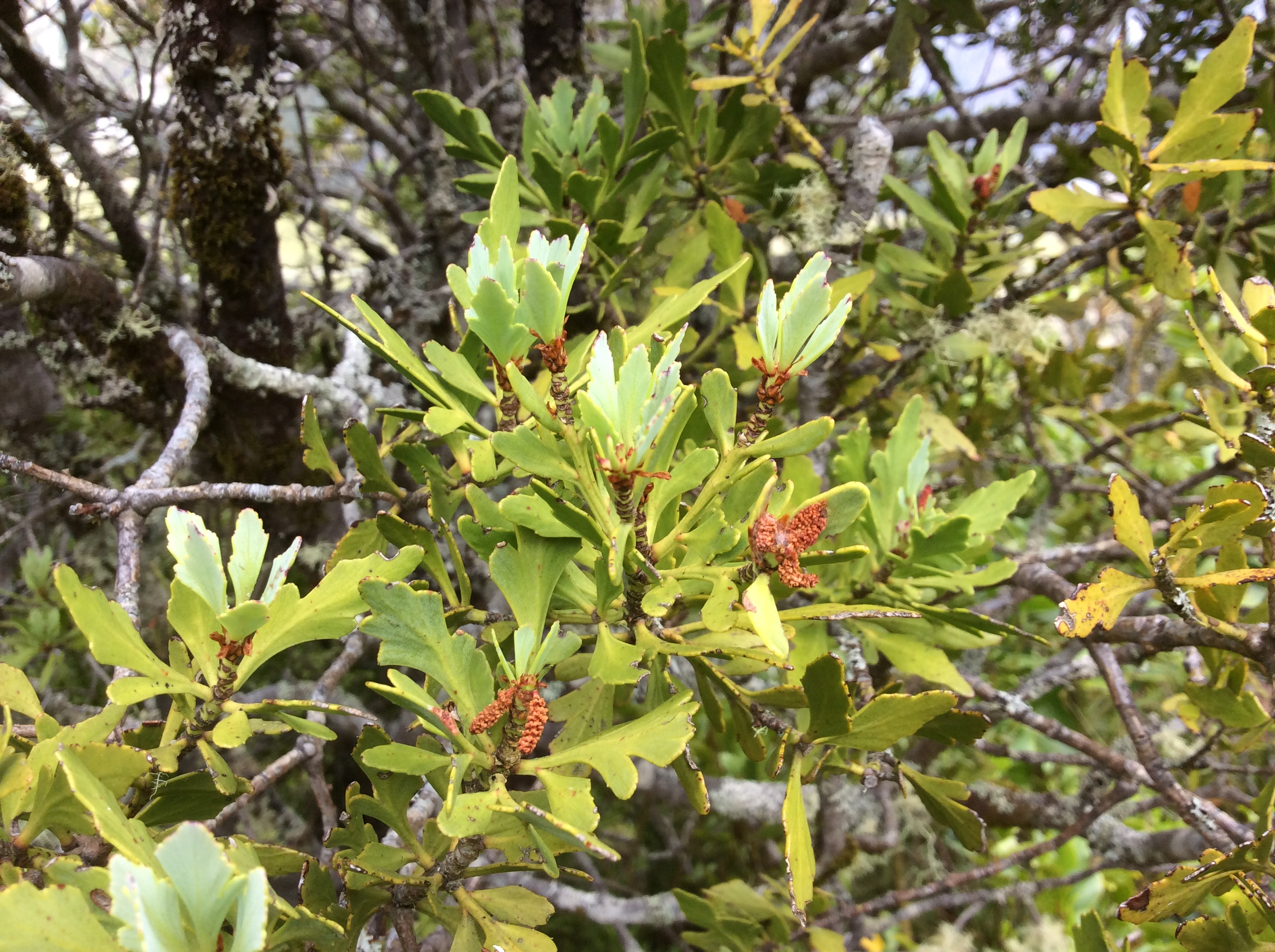
Pollen cones of P. alpinus

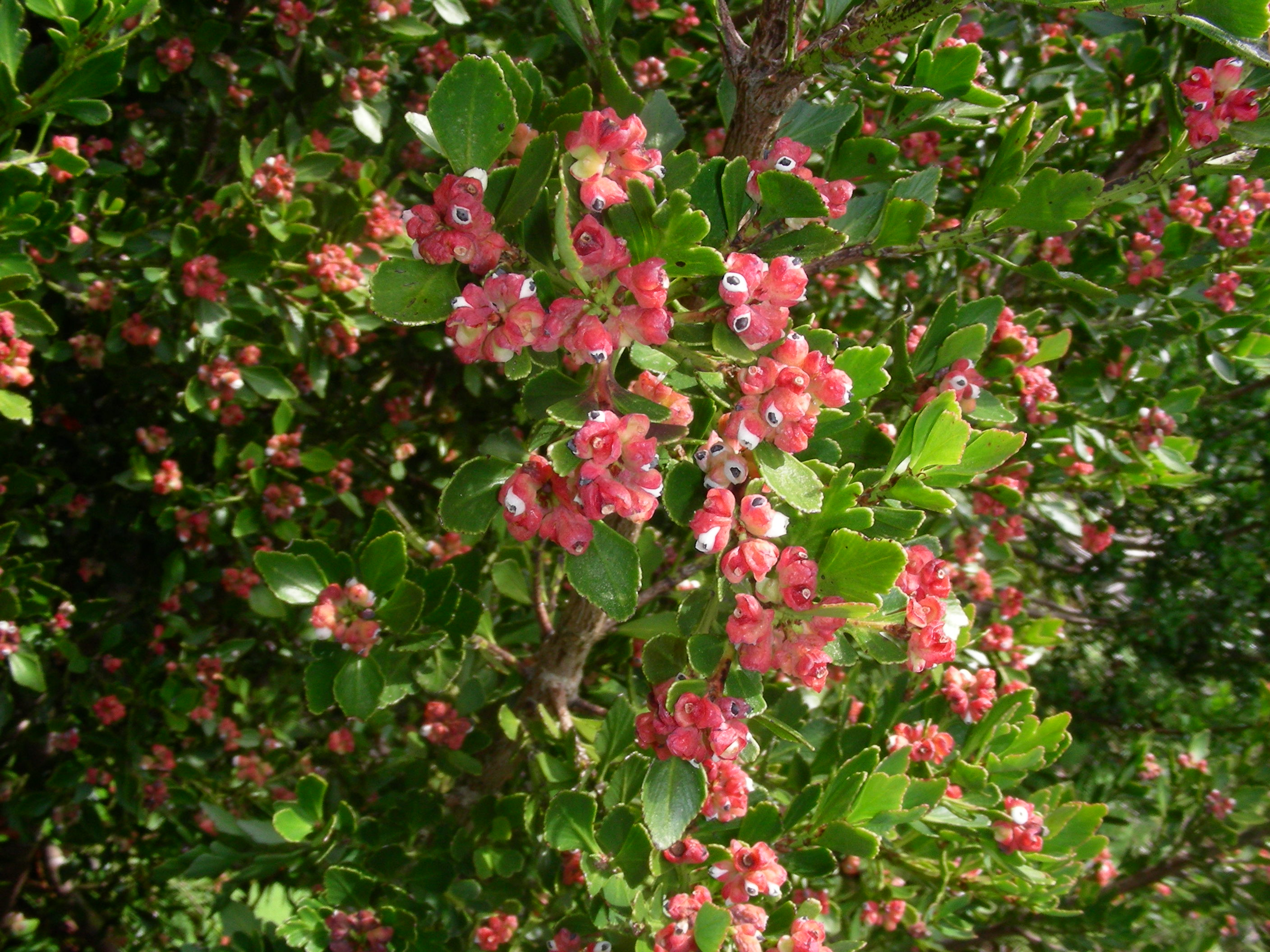
Seed cones of P. aspleniifolius

== Taxonomy ==
Phyllocladus is sufficiently morphologically distinct from the other Podocarpaceae genera that some botanists have treated them separately in their own family, Phyllocladaceae. However, while at least one molecular phylogenetic analysis found Phyllocladus to be sister to Podocarpus sensu stricto and another was equivocal on its position relative to Podocarpaceae s.s., two more recent molecular phylogenetic analyses have placed Phyllocladus within Podocarpaceae as a sister taxon to Lepidothamnus. Morphological analysis supports this placement, and therefore it has been suggested that the distinctive phylloclades in the genus are a synapomorphy.

The five species are genetically distinct, and probably arose between 5 and 7 million years ago.

== Species ==
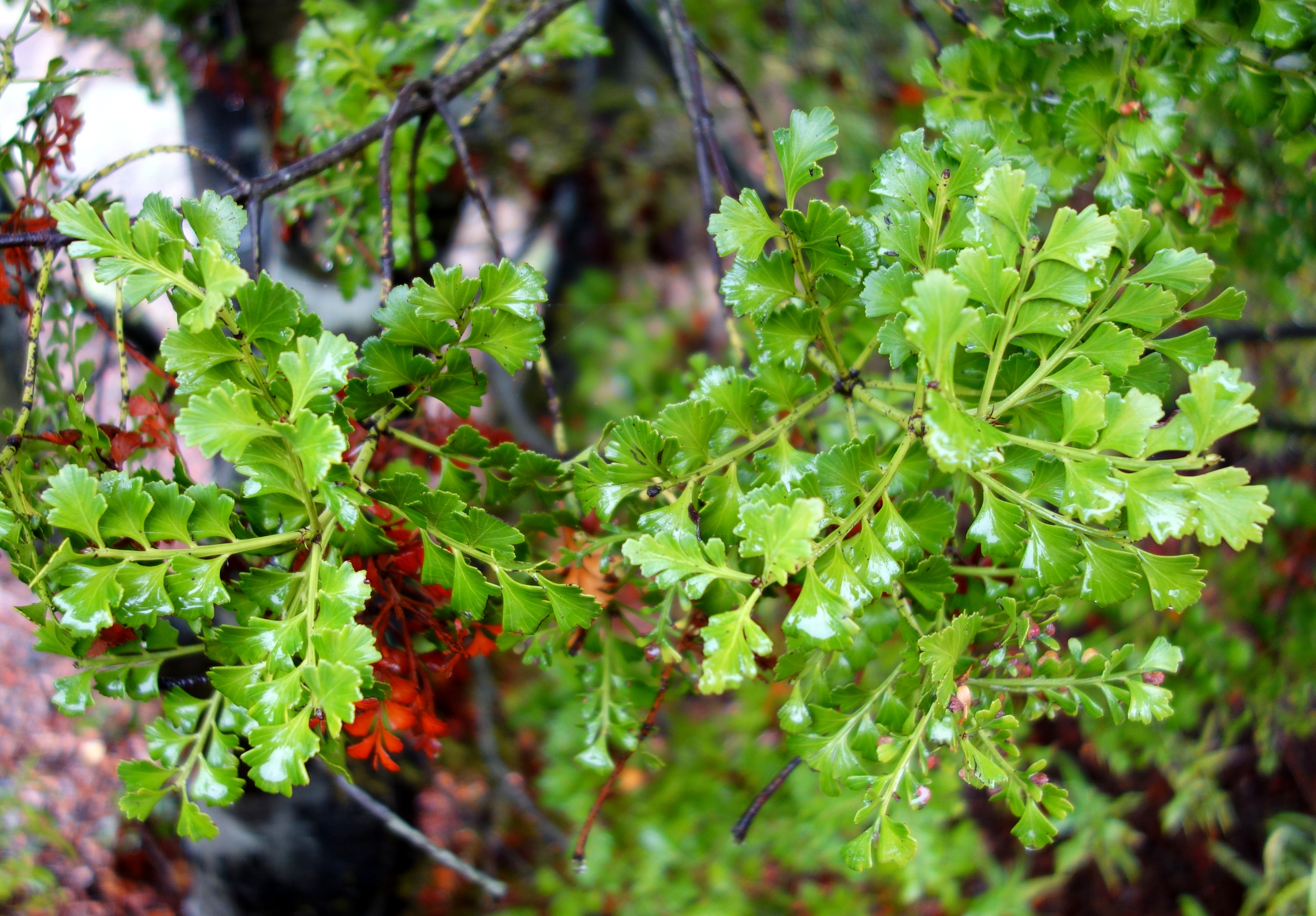
The phylloclades of P. aspleniifolius vary in shape between lobed and pinnate.

- Phyllocladus alpinus (P. trichomanoides var. alpinus) - mountain toatoa (New Zealand)
- Phyllocladus aspleniifolius - celery-top pine (Tasmania)
- Phyllocladus hypophyllus - Malesian celery-pine (New Guinea to Borneo and Philippines)
- Phyllocladus toatoa - toatoa (New Zealand)
- Phyllocladus trichomanoides - tanekaha (New Zealand)

Phylogeny of Phyllocladus

- - P. trichomanoides Don
  - - P. alpinus Hooker
    - - P. toatoa Molloy
      - - P. aspleniifolius (de Labillardière) Hooker
        - P. hypophyllus Hooker

== Sources ==
- Quinn, C. J. & Price, R. A. 2003. Phylogeny of the Southern Hemisphere Conifers. Proc. Fourth International Conifer Conference: 129-136.
