= Mount Titiraupenga =

Extinct volcano in North Island of New Zealand

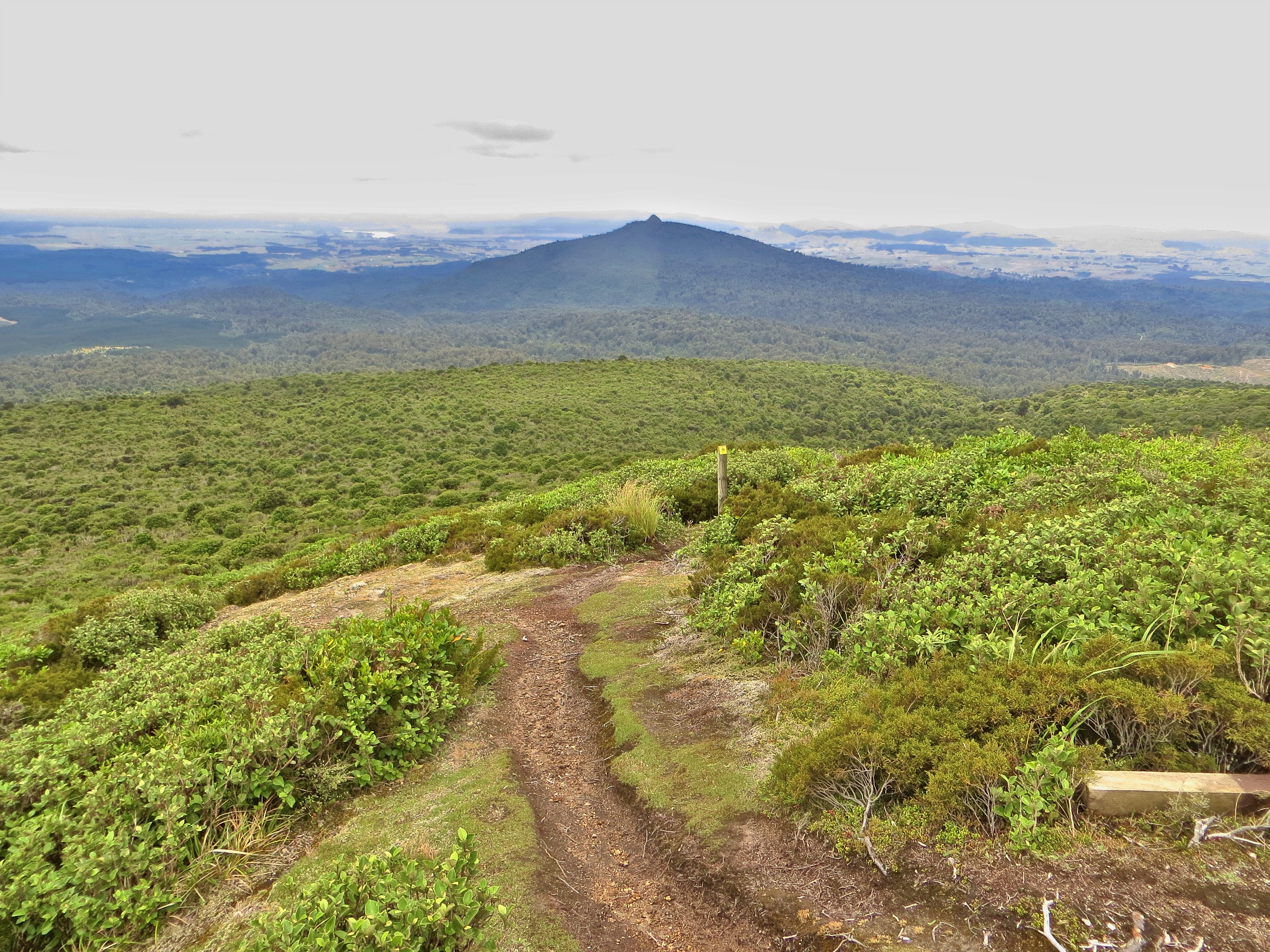
- Titiraupenga from Pureora summit

Highest point
- Elevation: 1,042 m (3,419 ft)
- Coordinates: 38°30′36″S 175°41′31″E

Geography
- Location within North Island
- Map centered to show approximate basaltic andesite surface volcanic deposits around Mount Titiraupenga. Mount Pureora deposits are to the south west. Other surface deposits are as in fuller key while mixed erosive volcanic surface deposits are uncoloured. Legend: Key for the volcanics that are shown with panning is: basalt (shades of brown/orange); monogenetic basalts; undifferentiated basalts of the Tangihua Complex in Northland Allochthon; arc basalts; arc ring basalts; dacite; andesite (shades of red); basaltic andesite; rhyolite (ignimbrite is lighter shades of violet); plutonic; White shading is selected caldera features.; Clicking on the rectangle icon enables full window and mouse-over with volcano name/wikilink and ages before present.
- Location: Waikato, New Zealand

Geology
- Rock age: Pleistocene
- Mountain type: Stratovolcano
- Last eruption: 1.89 ± 0.02 Ma.

Titiraupenga (also known as Mount Titiraupenga) is an extinct 1,042 metres (3,419 ft) high basaltic andesite stratovolcano on whose southern slopes is located the geographical centre of the North Island of New Zealand. It is in the Pureora Forest Park between Lake Taupō and Te Kūiti on the North Island Volcanic Plateau in New Zealand. The area of the mountain is in a scenic reserve that is "recognised as one of the finest rain forests in the world".

== Geography ==
The mountain is covered in native forest and is in the southern Waikato region.

=== Geology ===
Mount Titiraupenga has a prominence above the surrounding countryside of about 350 m (1,150 ft) and a diameter of about 3.5 km (2.2 mi). It is to the north east of a larger stratovolcano, Mount Pureora, and both are located to the south of the extinct Mangakino caldera on a basement of Waipapa composite terrane. The basaltic andesite lavas are made up of plagioclase, clinopyroxene and orthopyroxene, with rare olivine and hornblende phenocrysts with an age of 1.89 ± 0.02 Ma.

=== Access ===
The nearest main roads are State Highway 30 and State Highway 32. There is road access to a track to the summit, which also by a fair walk onwards gives access to the summit of Mount Pureora.

== See also ==
- List of volcanoes in New Zealand
- Pureora Forest Park
