= Mount Pureora =

Extinct volcano in the North Island of New Zealand

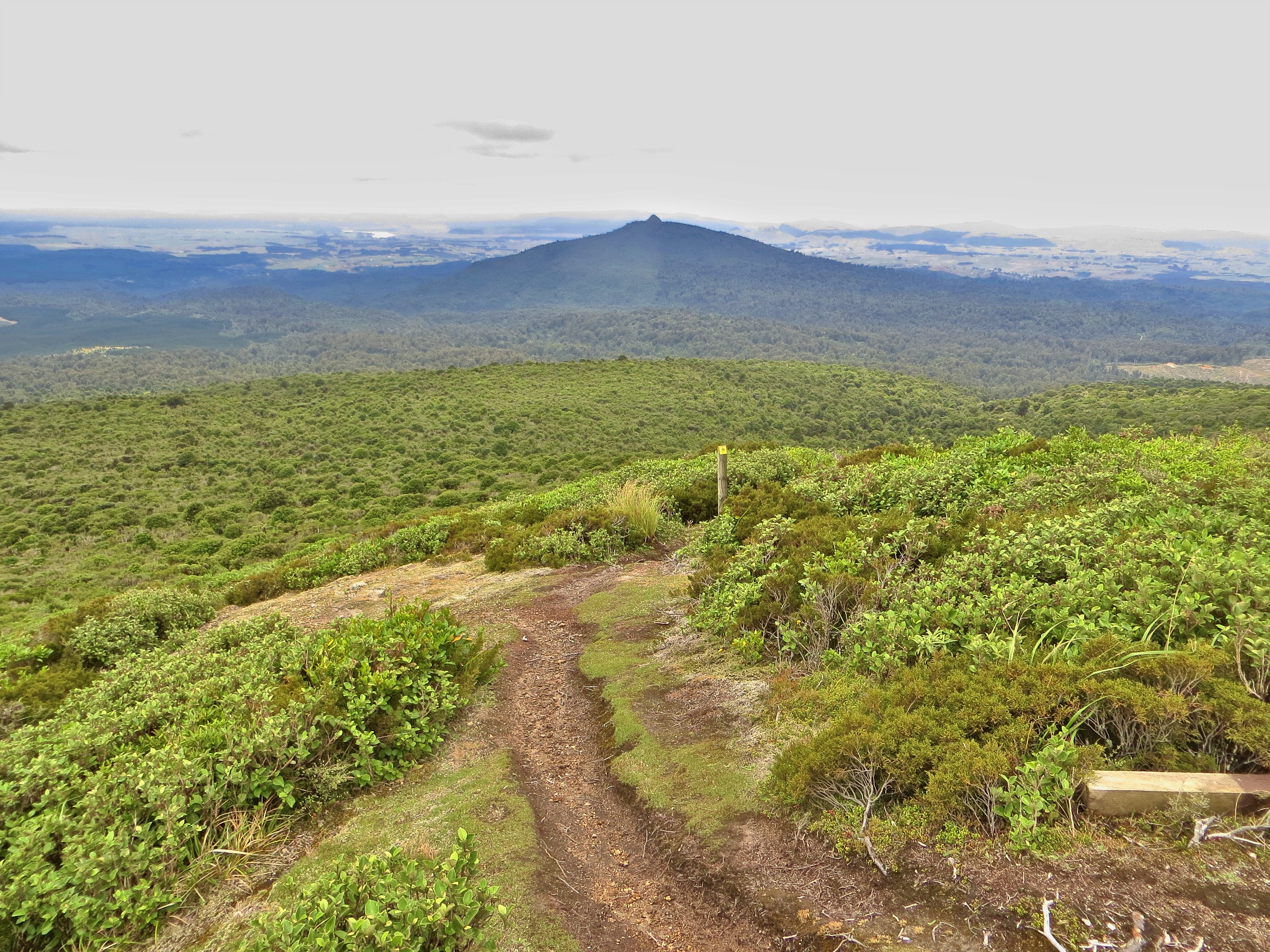
- Titiraupenga from Pureora summit

Highest point
- Elevation: 1,165 m (3,822 ft)
- Coordinates: 38°33′07″S 175°37′40″E

Geography
- Location within North Island
- Map showing approximate basaltic andesite surface volcanic deposits around Mount Pureora (red marker). Mount Titiraupenga deposits are to the north west. Other surface deposits are as in fuller key while mixed erosive volcanic surface deposits are uncoloured. Legend: Key for the volcanics that are shown with panning is: basalt (shades of brown/orange); monogenetic basalts; undifferentiated basalts of the Tangihua Complex in Northland Allochthon; arc basalts; arc ring basalts; dacite; andesite (shades of red); basaltic andesite; rhyolite (ignimbrite is lighter shades of violet); plutonic; White shading is selected caldera features.; Clicking on the rectangle icon enables full window and mouse-over with volcano name/wikilink and ages before present.
- Location: Waikato, New Zealand

Geology
- Rock age: Pleistocene
- Mountain type: Stratovolcano
- Last eruption: 1.60 ± 0.10 Ma.

Climbing
- Easiest route: Te Araroa

Pureora (known more usually as Mount Pureora to avoid confusion with the township, locality and Forest Park) is an extinct 1,165 metres (3,822 ft) high basaltic andesite stratovolcano located in the Pureora Forest Park between Lake Taupō and Te Kūiti on the North Island Volcanic Plateau in New Zealand. The area of the mountain is in a scenic reserve that is "recognised as one of the finest rain forests in the world".

== Geography ==
The mountain is covered in native forest and quite near the geographical centre of the North Island which is slightly to its west. It is located on the boundary of the Waikato and Manawatū-Whanganui regions.

=== Geology ===
Mount Pureora has a prominence above the surrounding countryside of about 450 m (1,480 ft) and a diameter of 5 km (3.1 mi). It is to the south west of a smaller pleioscene stratovolcano, Mount Titiraupenga, and both are located to the south of the ancient Mangakino caldera on a basement of Waipapa composite terrane. The basaltic andesite lavas are made up of plagioclase, clinopyroxene and orthopyroxene, with rare olivine and hornblende phenocrysts with an age of 1.60 ± 0.10 Ma.

=== Access ===
The mountain top is accessed by several trails and has bike access. These include a portion of the Te Araroa trail which incorporates the Timber trail and a branch of this called the Toi Toi track accessible off State Highway 30 near the township of Pureora. The Mount Pureora track is accessible also from back roads off State Highway 32, which lies to the west of Lake Taupō.

== See also ==
- List of volcanoes in New Zealand
- Pureora Forest Park
