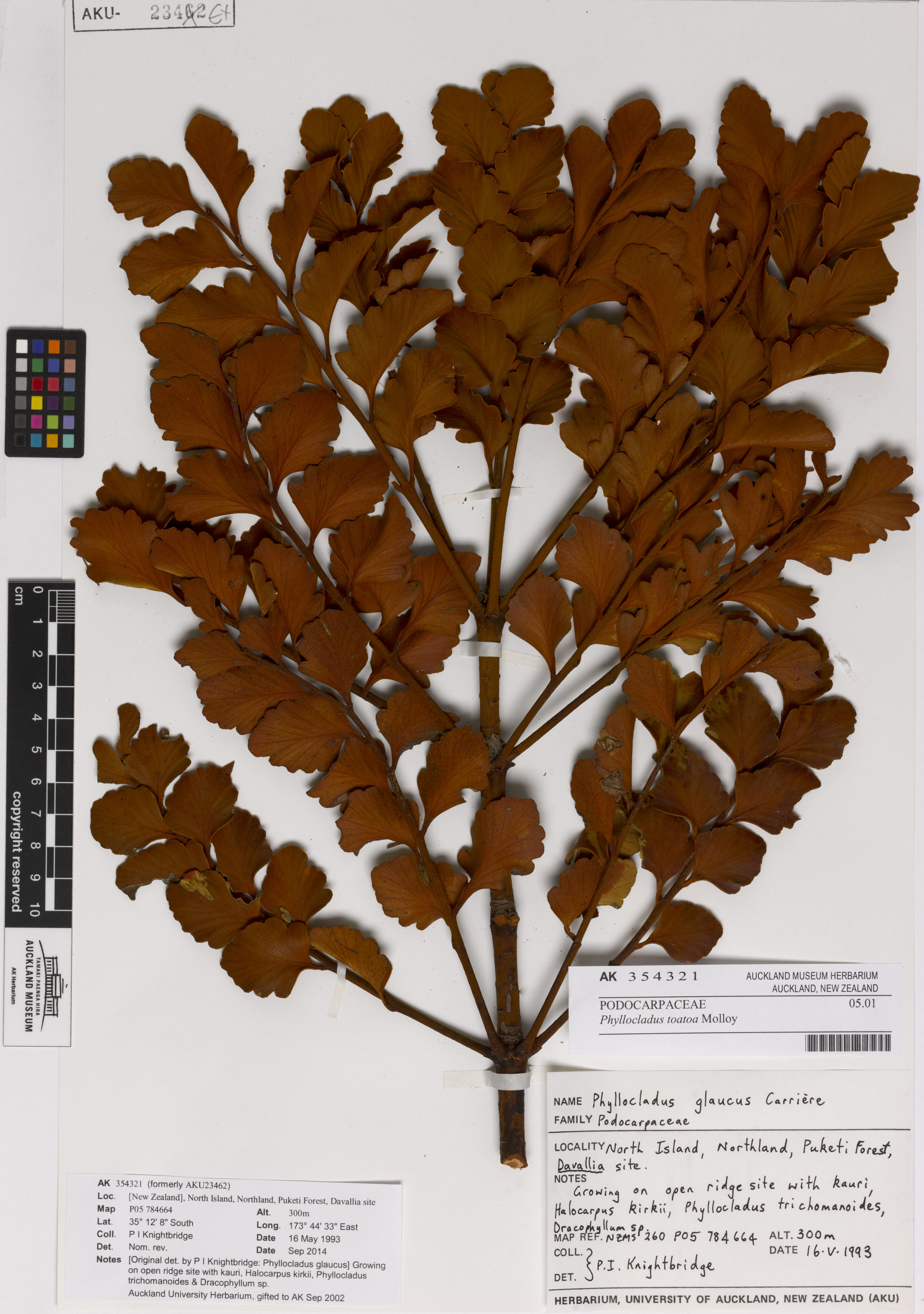

Conservation status
- Least Concern (IUCN 3.1)

Scientific classification
- Kingdom: Plantae
- Clade: Tracheophytes
- Clade: Gymnosperms
- Division: Pinophyta
- Class: Pinopsida
- Order: Araucariales
- Family: Podocarpaceae
- Genus: Phyllocladus
- Species: P. toatoa

Binomial name
- Phyllocladus toatoa Molloy

Synonyms
- Phyllocladus glaucus Kirk, nom. illeg. homonym. post.

= Phyllocladus toatoa =

Species of conifer

Phyllocladus toatoa, the toatoa (Māori) or blue celery pine, is a species of coniferous tree in the family Podocarpaceae, endemic to New Zealand.

== Botanical description ==
Phyllocladus toatoa is a small, dioecious or monoecious, conical or bushy tree that grows to 15 m (49 ft) in height and 60 cm (24 in) in diameter at maturity on average. The outer bark ranges in color from dark brown to a silvery-brown. P. toatoa is distinguishable from other species in the genus Phyllocladus due to its whorled pinnate phylloclades with diamond-shaped segments. Attached to whorled branches are cladodes. P. toatoa flowers between October and December, leading to a fruiting stage between January and March. The fruit is a nut sitting in a cup shaped envelope. Each fruit contains 3-4 3 mm square shaped seeds which are black at maturity. Cultivated mature plants flower annually. The species is wind pollinated by male cones which produce large quantities of pollen. Seeds are black. Mature seeds are dispersed from the cone through swelling of the cone bracts ejecting the seeds to the ground. Distribution is limited, resulting in many seeds landing on the ground under the female tree. Establishment of the species over a large area indicates that P. toatoa is dispersed by wind and birds. P. toatoa is difficult to propagate and is relatively slow growing.

== Distribution ==
This species is endemic to New Zealand and is found in the North Island.

== Range and habitat ==
Phyllocladus toatoa can be found in lowlands and montane forests including the central North Island and northwards. It is considered to be well protected and not considered threatened. Due to its tolerance of infertile soils, it can be found on exposed ridges, around bog margins, and other poorly drained land in New Zealand. The preferred habitat is that of a temperate climate with well-drained, moist soil, where roots are partially shaded and foliage is exposed to sun.
