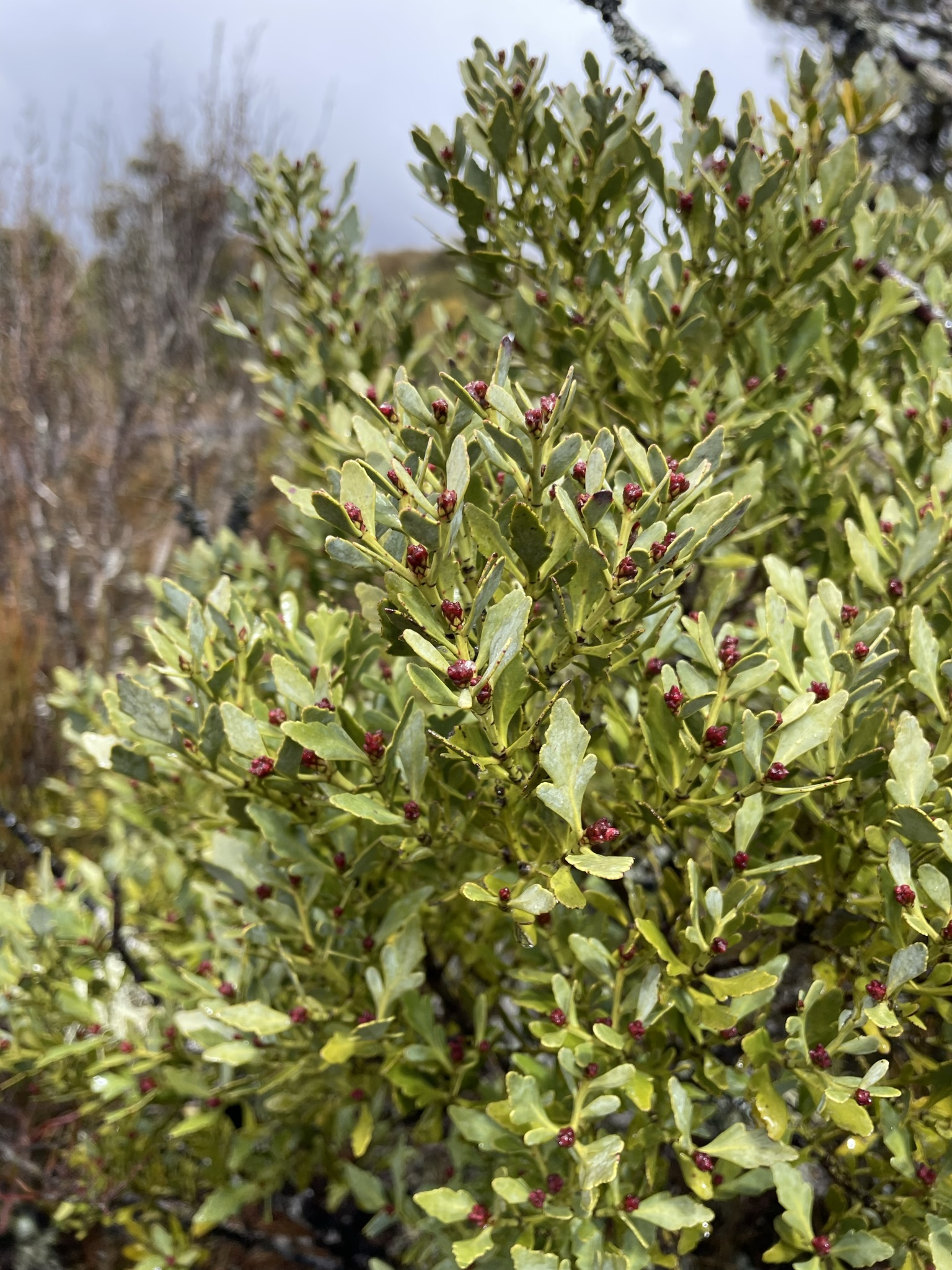

Conservation status
- Least Concern (IUCN 3.1)

Scientific classification
- Kingdom: Plantae
- Clade: Tracheophytes
- Clade: Gymnosperms
- Division: Pinophyta
- Class: Pinopsida
- Order: Araucariales
- Family: Podocarpaceae
- Genus: Phyllocladus
- Species: P. alpinus

Binomial name
- Phyllocladus alpinus Hook.f.

Synonyms
- Phyllocladus aspleniifolius var. alpinus (Hook.f.) H.Keng; Phyllocladus trichomanoides var. alpinus (Hook.f.) Parl.

= Phyllocladus alpinus =

Species of conifer

Phyllocladus alpinus, the mountain toatoa or mountain celery pine, is a species of conifer in the family Podocarpaceae. It is found only in New Zealand. The form of this plant ranges from a shrub to a small tree of up to seven metres in height. This species is found in both the North and South Islands. An example occurrence of P. alpinus is within the understory of beech/podocarp forests in the north part of South Island, New Zealand.

The species contains the flavan-3-ols catechin, epicatechin and phylloflavan (ent-epicatechin-3-δ-(3,4-dihydroxyphenyl)-β-hydroxypentanoate).

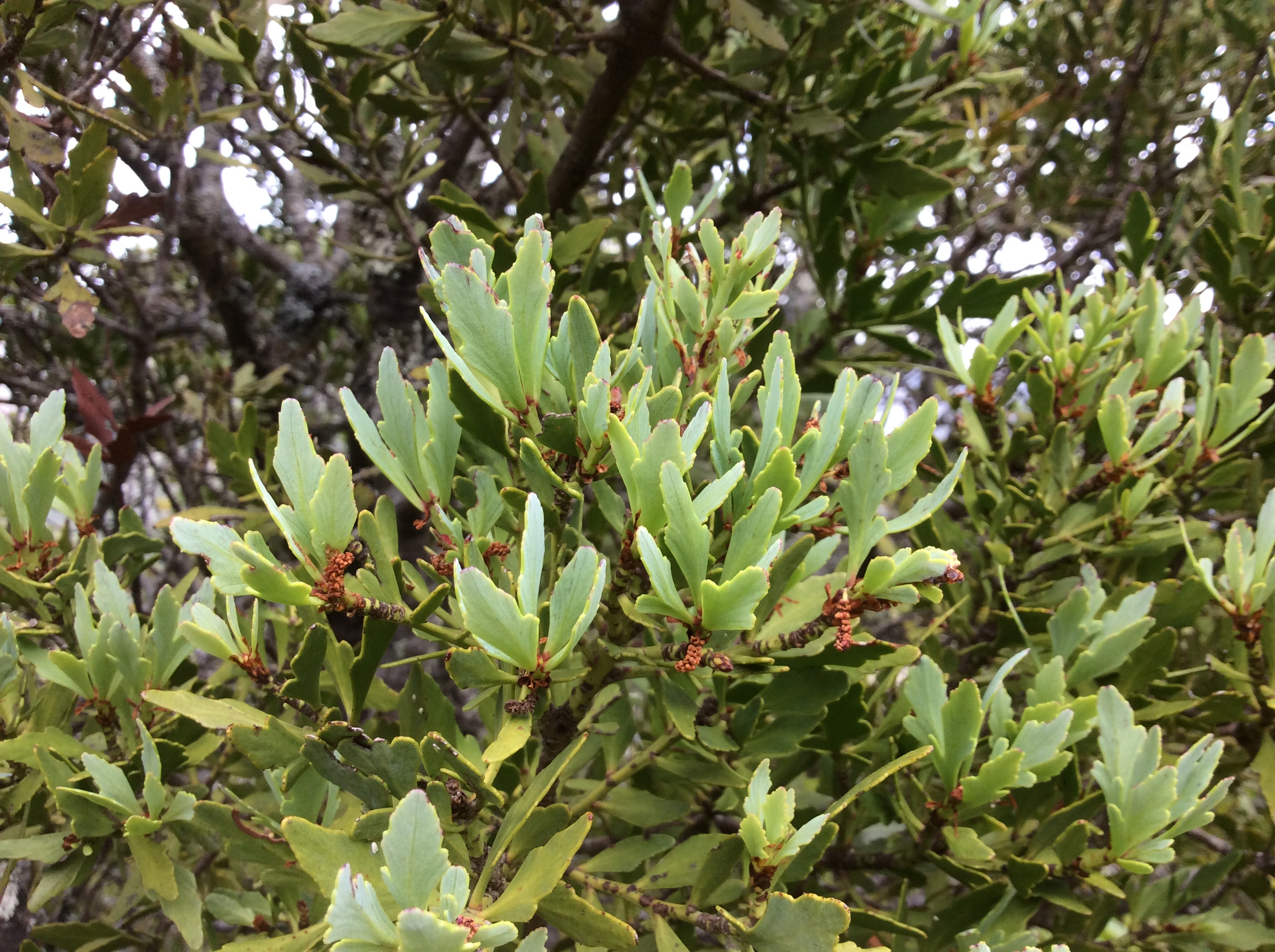
Phyllocladus alpinus pollen cones and phylloclades.

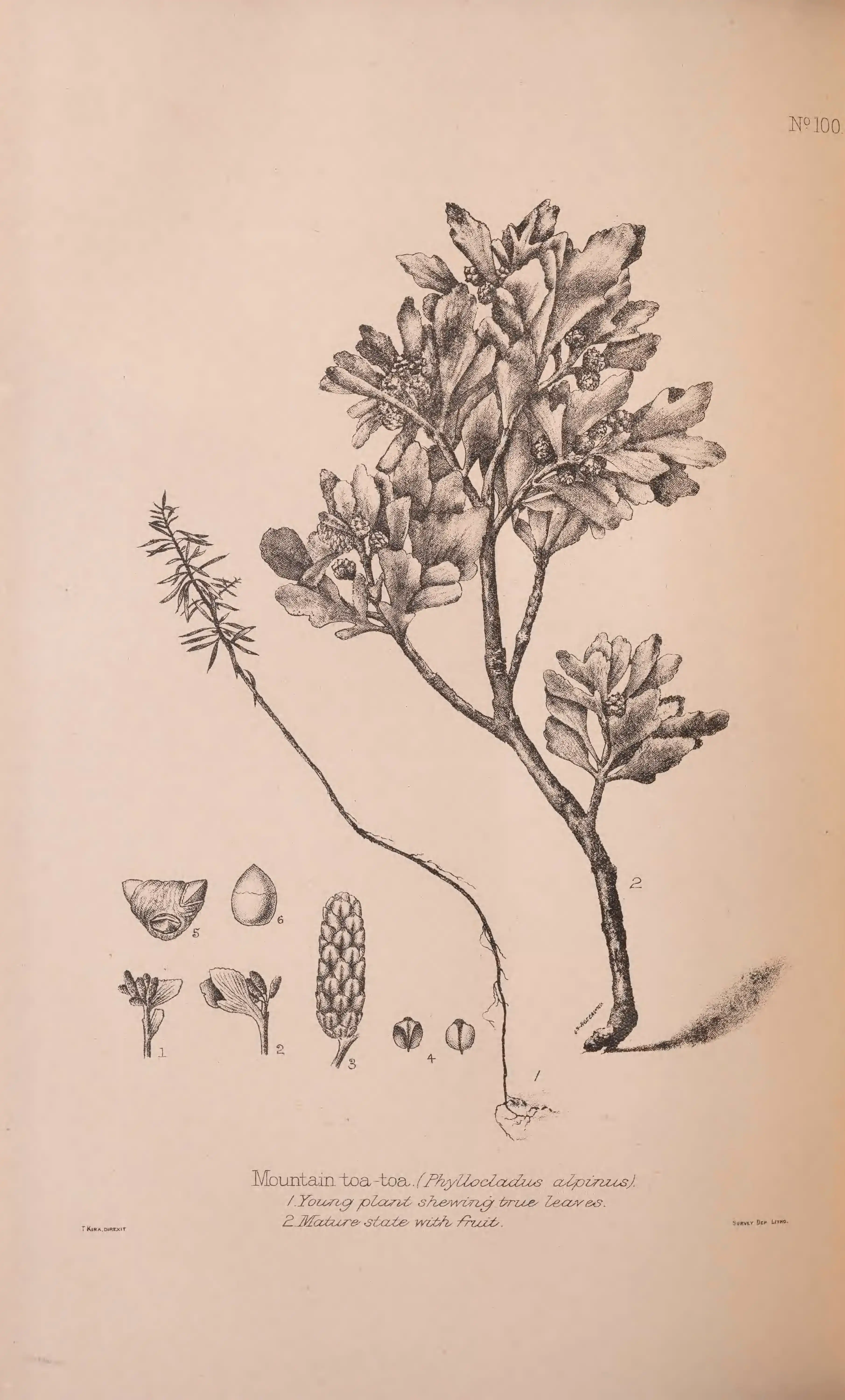
Illustration of species in Kirk's Forest Flora of New Zealand

== Pests and diseases ==
This species plays host to the New Zealand endemic beetles Agapanthida morosa and Agapanthida pulchella.

== Conservation status ==
In both 2009 and 2012 it was deemed to be "Not Threatened" under the New Zealand Threat Classification System, and this New Zealand classification was reaffirmed in 2018. The IUCN Red List assesses the species as least concern.

== See also ==
- Archeria traversii
