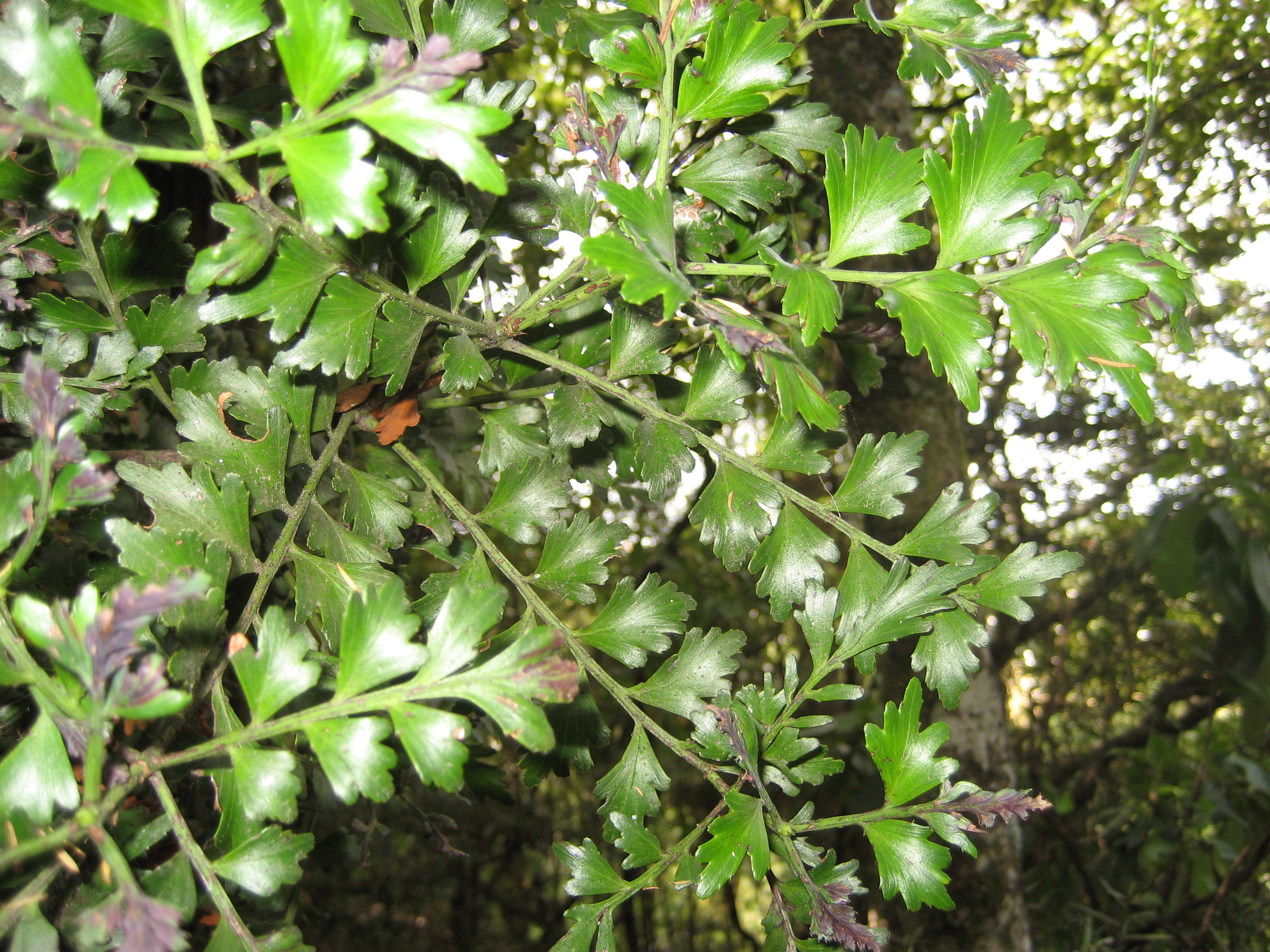

Conservation status
- Least Concern (IUCN 3.1)

Scientific classification
- Kingdom: Plantae
- Clade: Tracheophytes
- Clade: Gymnosperms
- Division: Pinophyta
- Class: Pinopsida
- Order: Araucariales
- Family: Podocarpaceae
- Genus: Phyllocladus
- Species: P. trichomanoides

Binomial name
- Phyllocladus trichomanoides D.Don

= Phyllocladus trichomanoides =

Tanekaha

Species of conifer

Phyllocladus trichomanoides, the tānekaha or celery pine, is a species of coniferous tree endemic to New Zealand.

== Description ==
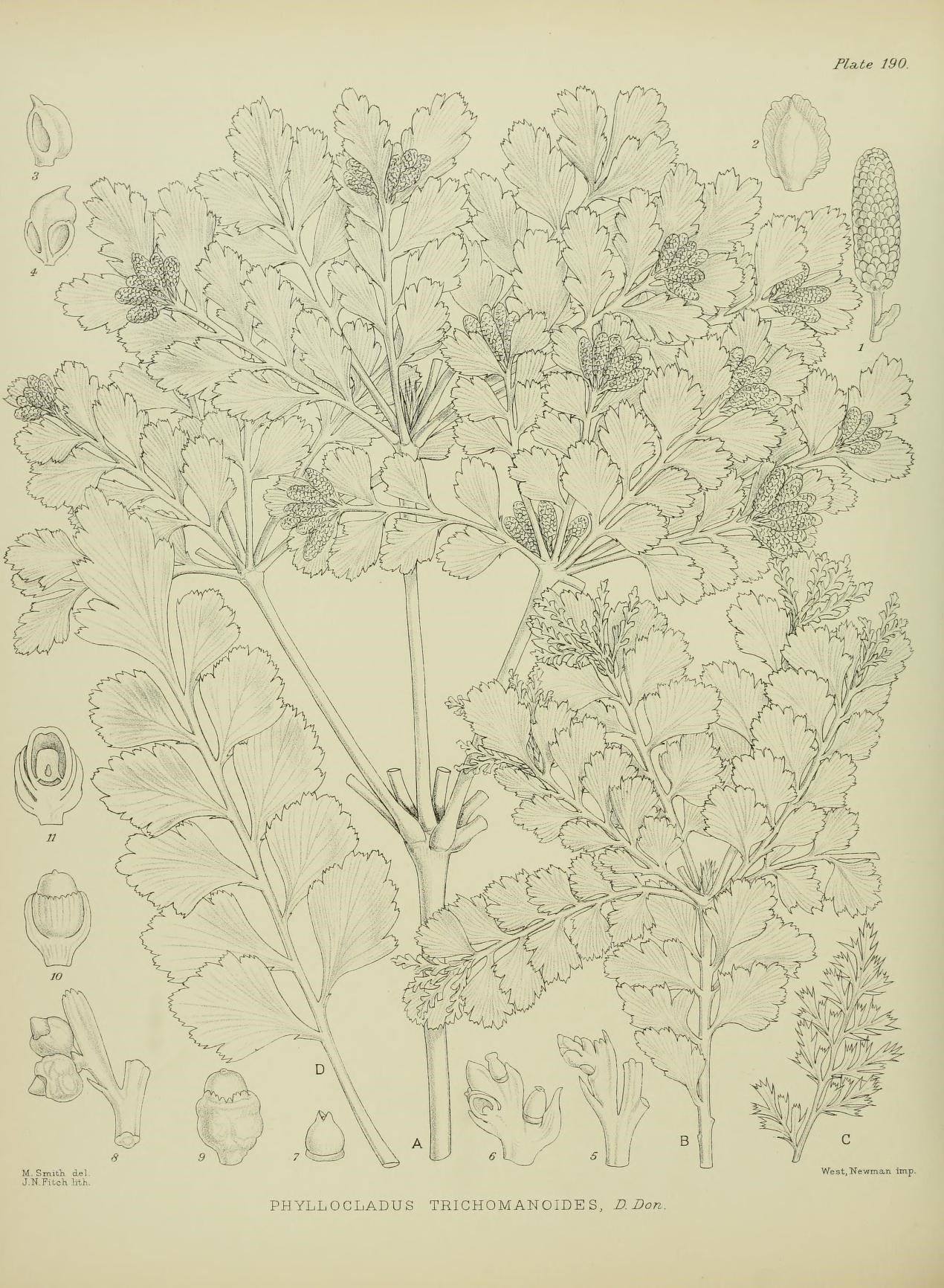
Illustration of P. trichomanoides.

Tānekaha is a medium-sized forest tree growing up to 25 metres (82 feet) in height and 1 m trunk diameter. The main structural shoots are green-skinned for 2–3 years, then turn brown as the bark thickens. The leaves are sparse, tiny, scale-like, 2–3 mm long, and only green (photosynthetic) for a short time, soon turning brown.

Most photosynthesis is performed by phylloclades, highly modified, leaf-like short shoots; these are arranged alternately, 10–15 on a shoot, the individual phylloclades rhombic, 1.5–2–5 cm long. The seed cones are berry-like, with a fleshy white aril surrounding but not fully enclosing the single seed.

== Distribution ==
In the North Island, this species is found in lowland forests from Te Paki to 40°S. In the South Island, this species is found in northern Marlborough and Nelson to 41°30'S.

== Pests and diseases ==
This species plays host to the New Zealand endemic beetle Agapanthida morosa.

== Economic uses ==
Like the kauri, tānekaha shed their lower branches, producing smooth straight trunks and knot-free timber which is sought after for its strength.

The bark is rich in tannin, from which Māori extracted a red dye.
