= NZ Native Forests Restoration Trust =

New Zealand forest restoration organisation

- Founded: 1980
- Headquarters: Auckland, New Zealand

Old logo of the Trust.

Founded in 1980, the NZ Native Forests Restoration Trust is an organisation involved in forest restoration.

The Trust acquires land to protect important species, restore their habitats and to improve the quality of waterways. It now has almost 40 reserves throughout the North Island and South Island of New Zealand totalling over 9,000ha of protected native forests.

Sir Edmund Hillary was the foundation patron of the trust until his death in 2008. Sir Paul Reeves then became patron until his death in 2011.

The Trust publishes its Canopy newsletter twice a year.

== See also ==
- List of environmental organizations
