= Īhenga =

Early Māori explorer

Places in the life of Īhenga
1 Mount Moehau
2 Maketu
3 Lake Rotoiti
4 Ngongotahā
5 Kaipara
6 Ripiro Beach
7 Kawakawa
8 Whangārei

Īhenga was an early Māori explorer and rangatira of Te Arawa. After burying his father at Moehau, he travelled to Maketu to be purified by his uncle Kahumatamomoe, whose daughter he married. He explored the North Island and named many places, including Lakes Rotoiti and Rotorua. He tricked the existing residents out of their land and settled at Ngongotaha. Later, he and Kahumamatamomoe travelled to Kaipara together. He might have lived in the early fifteenth century.

== Life ==
Īhenga was the youngest son of Tuhoromatakakā and Uenuku-whakarorongarangi. He had three elder brothers: Taramainuku, who ultimately settled at Kaipara, Warenga, who settled at Kawakawa in the Bay of Islands, and Huarere, who remained at Moehau. Through his father, he was a grandson of Tama-te-kapua, the captain of the Arawa canoe, which brought Te Arawa from Hawaiki to New Zealand. According to some sources, Īhenga was on the Arawa himself. Tama-te-kapua had originally settled at Maketu in the Bay of Plenty with his sons Tuhoromatakakā and Kahumatamomoe, but disagreements over the ownership of fields led Tama-te-kapua and Tuhoromatakakā to depart for Moehau.

=== Death of Tuhoromatakakā ===
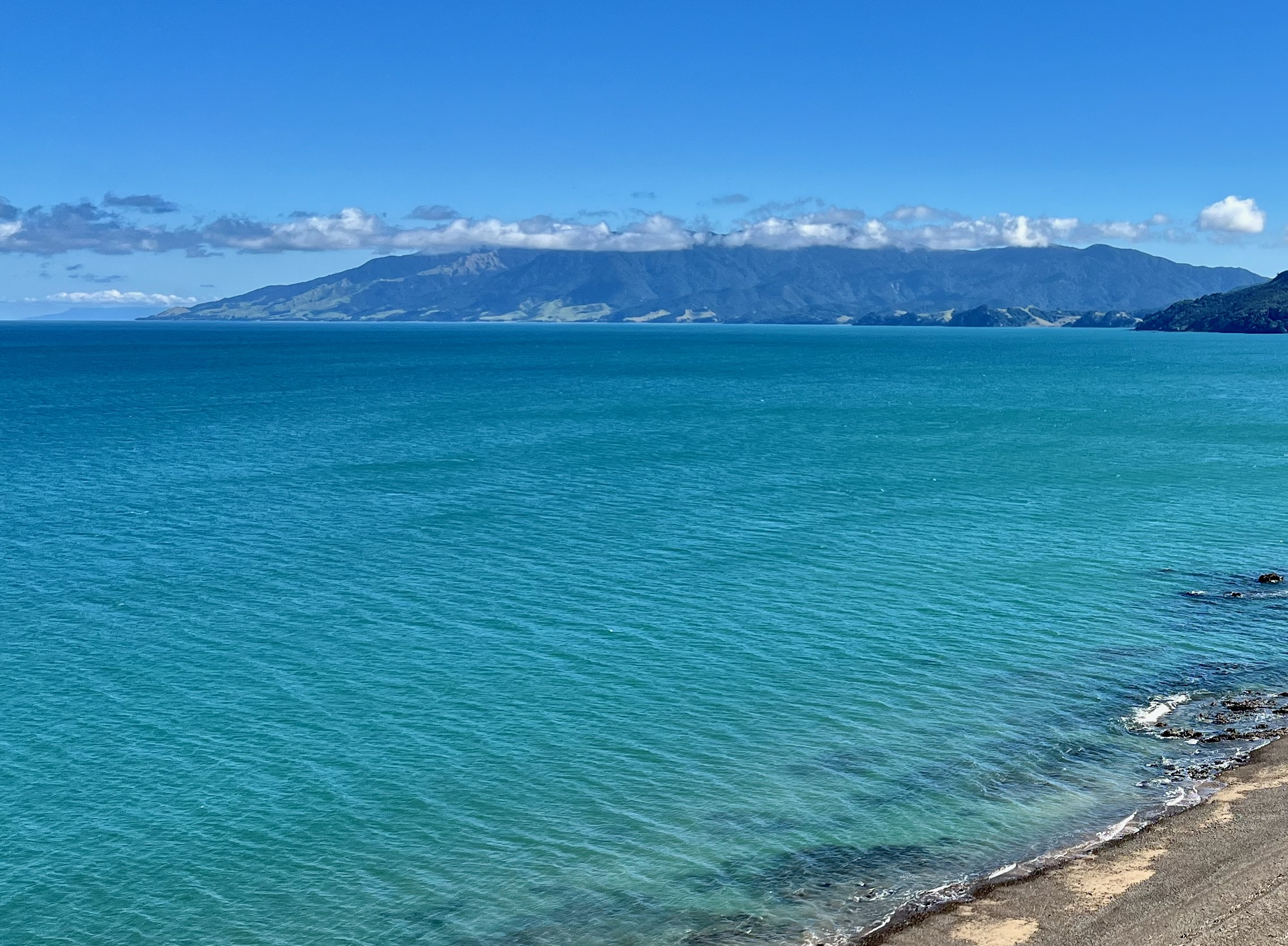
Mount Moehau, seen from the southwest

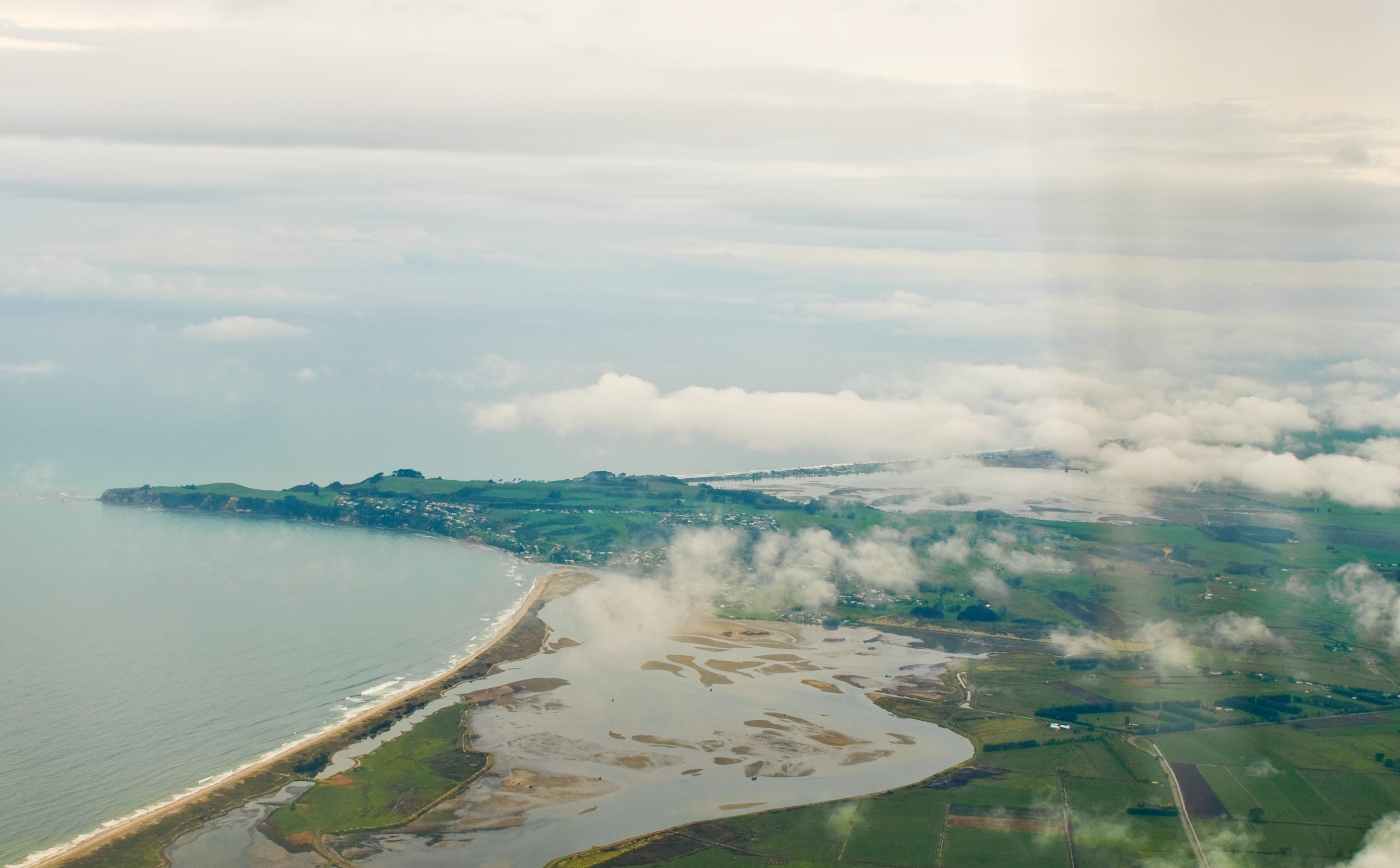
Maketu, seen from the west

Tuhoromatakakā died as a result of breaching tapu after conducting Tama-te-kapua's funeral at Moehau. On his deathbed, Tuhoromatakakā instructed Īhenga, to carry out a particular funerary ritual. Īhenga was to bite Tuhoromatakaka's forehead and perineum and then bury him next to Tama-te-kapua, in order to make him into an ikahurihuri ("twisting fish," a type of oracle). When he did this, Tuhoromatakakā's body twisted from side to side, signifying that his descendants would fail to hold their land in the Coromandel. After this, Īhenga placed Tuhoromatakakā's body in a foetal position, with his knees touching his neck, covered in him in two kahakaha cloaks, two cloaks for old men, and a dogskin cloak, placed feathers from toroa, huia, and kotuku in his hair, and toroa down in his ears. Then he buried him. In the night, Tuhoromatakakā's ghost came to Īhenga and forbade him from asking for food or water, taught him karakia, and dispatched him to Maketu to be cleansed from the tapu of the funeral at the hands of Kahumatamomoe.

Īhenga snuck into Kahumatamomoe's house and seated himself on Kahumatamomoe's pillow, a sacred spot. When he heard of this, Kahumatamomoe came storming in, intending to kill the invader for the insult, but he recognised Īhenga as his nephew, welcomed him, and cleansed him of the tapu. First, he washed him in the Kaituna River. Then he carried out the pure ritual, cutting off Īhenga's hair and tying it to a stone which was deposited in a sacred place. Then his daughter presented them with a meal of kumara, carefully averting her face so that she did not breathe in any of the steam; Kahumatamomoe gave Īhenga some of the kohukohu moss in which the kumara had been cooked and led him in offering it to stone images and to their deceased relatives. Finally, Kahumatamomoe spat on the kohukohu and offered it to Tama-te-kapua. D. M. Stafford gives translations of the karakia (incantations) that were sung during these rituals. After the purification, Kahumatamomoe allowed Īhenga to marry his daughter Hinetekakara. Īhenga dug up a pounamu earring that his father had ripped from Kahumatamomoe's ear and gave it to his new wife. Seeing this, Kahumatamomoe mourned for his brother and granted the earring to his daughter.

=== Journey to Rotoiti ===
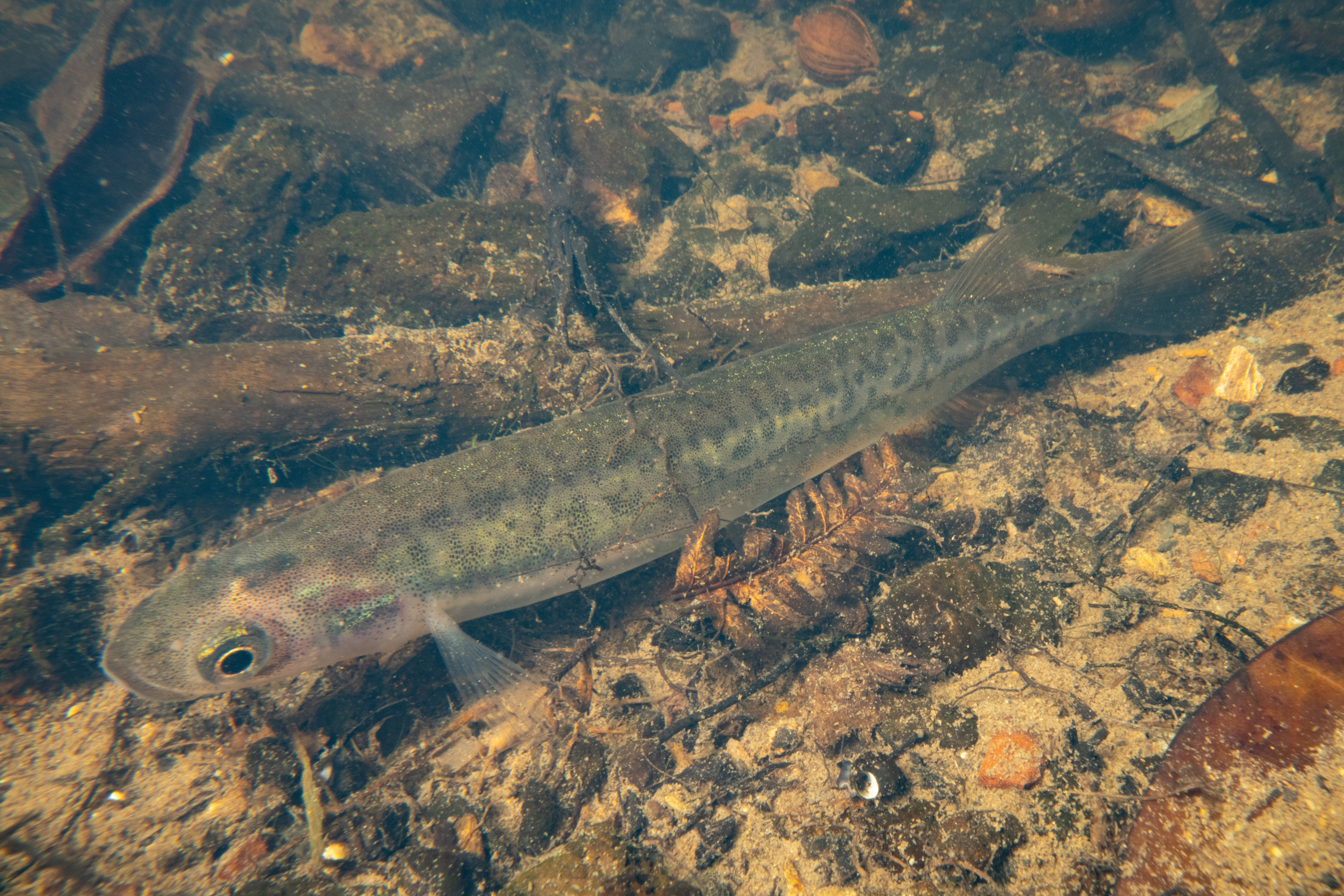
Inanga ("whitebait")

When Hinetekakara became pregnant, Īhenga set out with his dog Potakatawhiti to hunt kiwi for her. He first discovered Kaituna, "the chiefly river". He went over the Kawa swamp, past Papanui at Paengaroa, and Paretawa Hill at Waipumuka. At Hakomiti and Pukerangiora he began hunting, but the dog got thirsty and ran off, returning with a mouth full of inanga ("whitebait"), which it vomited up in front of Īhenga. This prompted Īhenga to search for the nearby water source, which he found and named Te Roto-iti-kite-a-Īhenga, "the little lake seen by Īhenga" or Te Roto-whaiti-kite-a-Īhenga, "the narrow lake seen by Īhenga", now known as Lake Rotoiti. Then he returned to Maketu and served up a feast of six hundred kiwi. Hinetekakara conducted the ceremony of Turakanga to strengthen her unborn child.

=== Journey to Rotorua ===
Places associated with Īhenga around Lake Rotorua
1 Tuarahiwiroa
2 Mokoia Island
3 Kawaha
4 Waikuta Stream
5 Mount Ngongotahā
6 Te Awahou
7 Puhirua
8 Whakarongo, Mount Pukepoto
9 Ōhinemutu

After Hinetekakara gave birth to a son, Tama-ihu-toroa, Kahumatamomoe encouraged Īhenga to set out once more to find new lands for the newborn. He went from Matapara to Te Hiapo, to Te Wharepakauawe, and on to Lake Rotorua, which he named Te Rotoruanui-a-Kahumatamomoe ("The great double lake of Kahumatamomoe") in honour of his uncle. He named Tuarahiwiroa peninsula and attempted to snare shags there, but the shags flew off with the snares and landed on Mokoia Island, which Īhenga named Te Motutapu-a-Tinirau.

==== Tricking Tuarotorua ====
Īhenga went on to Kawaha where he saw smoke of campfires and realised that the land was inhabited. He found the tūāhu altar of the local people, which was old and decayed, and dissassembled it. Then he built a brand new tūāhu on the site and used the decayed materials from the old tūāhu to build his own altar at Kawaha, which he named Te Peraotangaroa. When he encountered the chief of the inhabitants of the place, Tuarotorua, Īhenga claimed that the land was his and pointed to the fact that his tūāhu was old and decayed while Tuarotorua's tūāhu was brand new as evidence of his primacy. As a second proof, Īhenga pointed to a rock slip on a cliff, asserting that it was his fishing net. He forced Tuarotorua to leave the mainland and settle on Mokoia Island.

==== Encounter with the Patupaiarehe ====
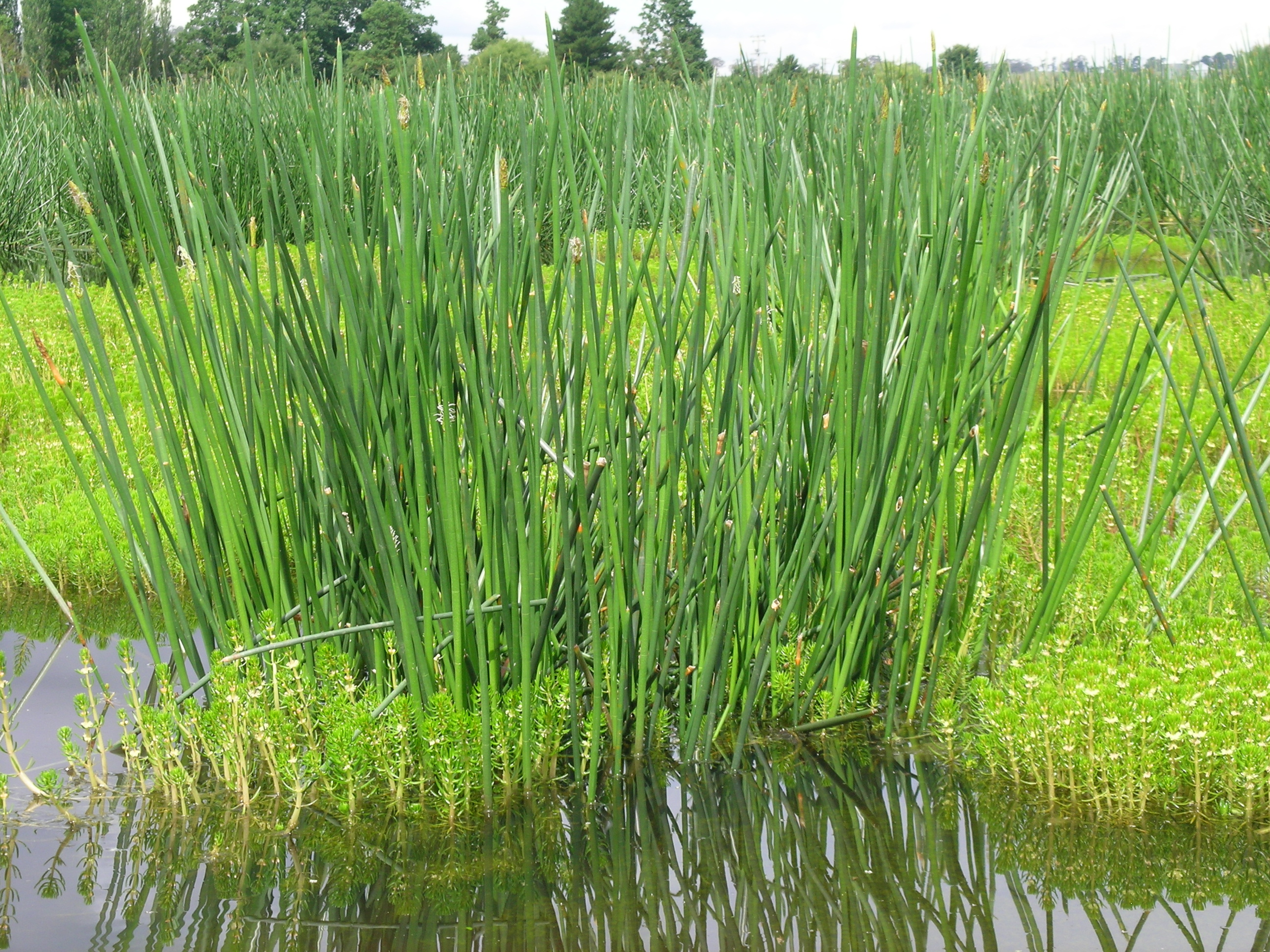
kuta reeds

He found the shags that he had snared in a kahikatea tree by a stream which he named Waikuta, because it was surrounded by kuta reeds and called the area Rāroa ("long day") because of how long it had taken him to find the shags. Nearby, Īhenga heard Patupaiarehe (fairy-people) playing music at their settlement on the summit of a mountain, which was called Te Tuahuoteatua. He snuck up and found them surrounding a burning tree, but they spotted him, so he fled, setting the forest and settlement on fire as a distraction. When he returned, the place was abandoned and he found a moa's jawbone, so he named the place Te Kauae ("the jawbone"). He named the place Ngongotahā ("drink a calabash"), because one of the Patupaiarehe had given him a calabash to drink from when he first reached the top of the hill. D. M. Stafford and James Cowan record three songs sung by the Patupaiarehe.

Īhenga named further places around Lake Rotorua:

- Weriweri,
- Kopu,
- Te Awahou
- Puhirua ("feather-fall"), because the feathers fell out of his top-knot there.
- Tanewhiti ("man shocked"), because inanga leapt into his canoe there.
- Tupa-karia-a-Īhenga ("Īhenga's boasting"), because he had a boastful thought.
- Ohau River, named after his dog, which drowned there
- Te Tawa, because his tawa-wood puntpole stuck in the ground there and could not be removed.

Finally, Īhenga returned to Tuarahiwiroa, where he presented the food he had found to Hinetekakara. She was shocked by rat's tooth among the food, so the place was named Te Niho-o-te-kiore ("The rat's tooth").

==== Bringing Kahumatamomoe to Rotorua ====
On his return to Maketu, Īhenga declared that the area belonged to Kahumatamomoe and convinced him to come and settle there. First, Īhenga brought Kahumatamomoe to Lake Rotoiti, which he gave to him. Later, Kahumatamomoe removed a kākā feather (hou kākā) from his top-knot and placed it in the ground to be a protective taniwha, so the place was named Ohoukaka. As they were travelling along in their canoe, Kahumatamomoe suddenly undressed, leapt into the water, and swam to a beach. His grandsons laughed and said "See, there go Kahu's legs," so the place was named Kūwhārua-o-Kahu ("two thighs of Kahu"). They built a whata (raised food store) near Tuarahiwiroa and named the place Te Whata. Passing the hot springs, Te Pera-o-tangaroa, and Waiohiro stream, they arrived at Ngongotahā (called Parawai by Kahumatamomoe), where they settled.

=== Journey to Kaipara ===
Two years later, Kahumatamomoe decided to make a trip to visit his nephew Taramainuku, Īhenga's older brother, who now lived at Kaipara in Northland. Īhenga and Kahumatamomoe's son Tawake-moe-tahanga accompanied him. At one point on the journey, they rested under a rātā tree and Kahumatamomoe named the place Te Whakamarumaru o Kahu ("The sun-shade of Kahu"); Īhenga responded by naming the place Te Ure o Tūhoro ("The penis of Tūhoro") after his own father, because he saw a mataī tree with a penis-like growth on its trunk. Further on, their dog caught a kākāpō at a spot which they named Te Kākāpō. Kahumatamomoe named Matanuku after the lyrics of a karakia called Uruuruwhenua. After crossing the Waikato River, the younger men became very slow, so Kahumatamomoe named the spot Māngere ("lazy"). They crossed the Waipā River, passed Mount Pirongia and Waingaroa and came to Port Waikato, where they met Ohomairangi, a great-uncle of Īhenga, who had come to New Zealand on the Tainui. To the north, Kahumatamomoe set up a mānuka post as a rahui (sacred marker) and named the place Manuka (which might be Manukau). Īhenga and the others travelled north to Kaipara Harbour by sea in a canoe, while Kahumatamomoe accompanied them on the back of a taniwha called Paikea.

At Kaipara, the travellers met with Taramainuku and he gave them his daughter Hinetu-te-rauniao, to be married to Kahumatamomoe's grandson Uenuku-mai-rarotonga. The travellers were presented with a great feast, including baskets of para fern. Kahumatamomoe was so impressed with the para, which he had never had before, that he named the region Kaipara ("eat para"). Kahumatamomoe then departed for Rotorua.

==== Further travels in the North ====
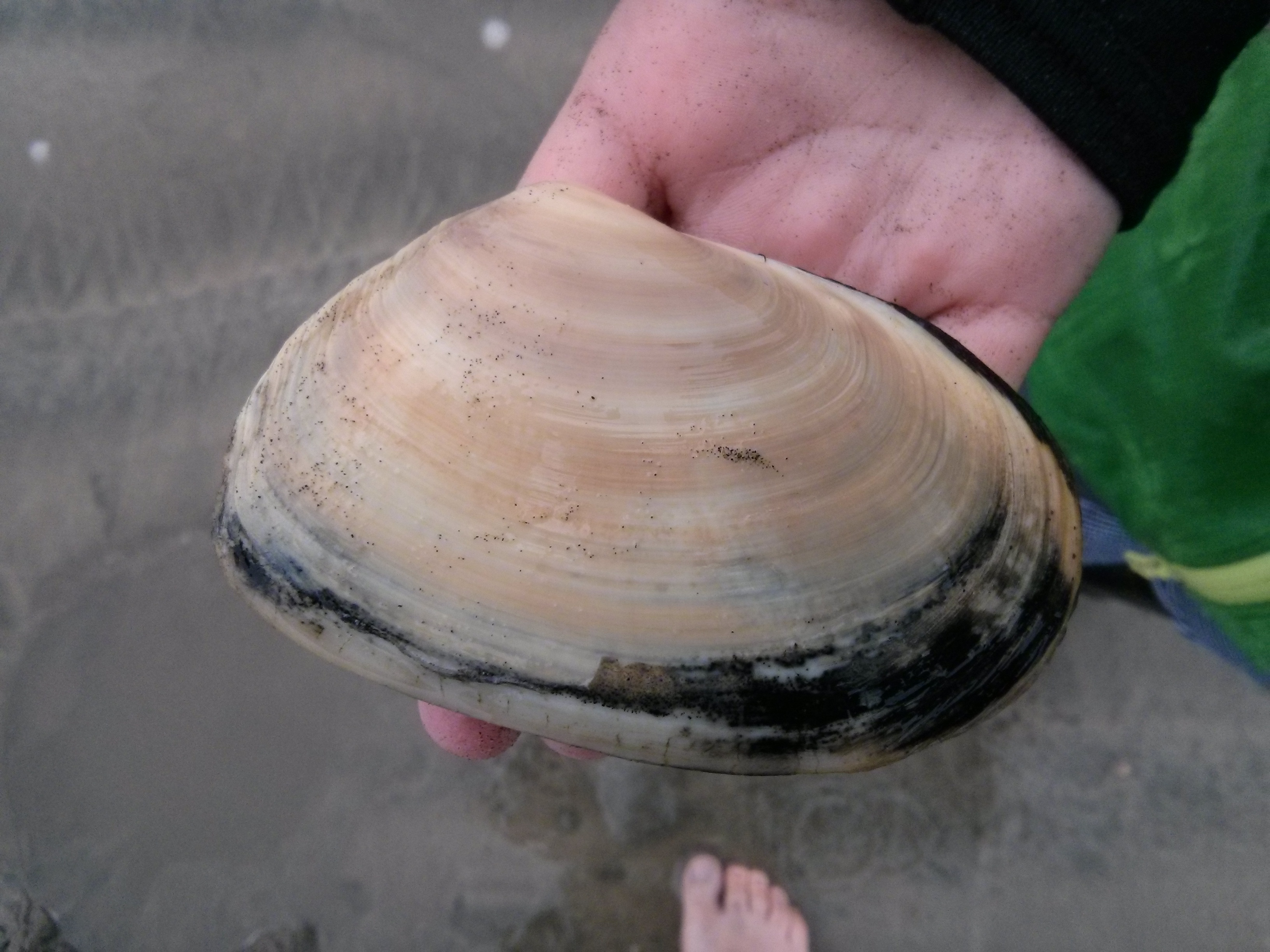
Toheroa shell

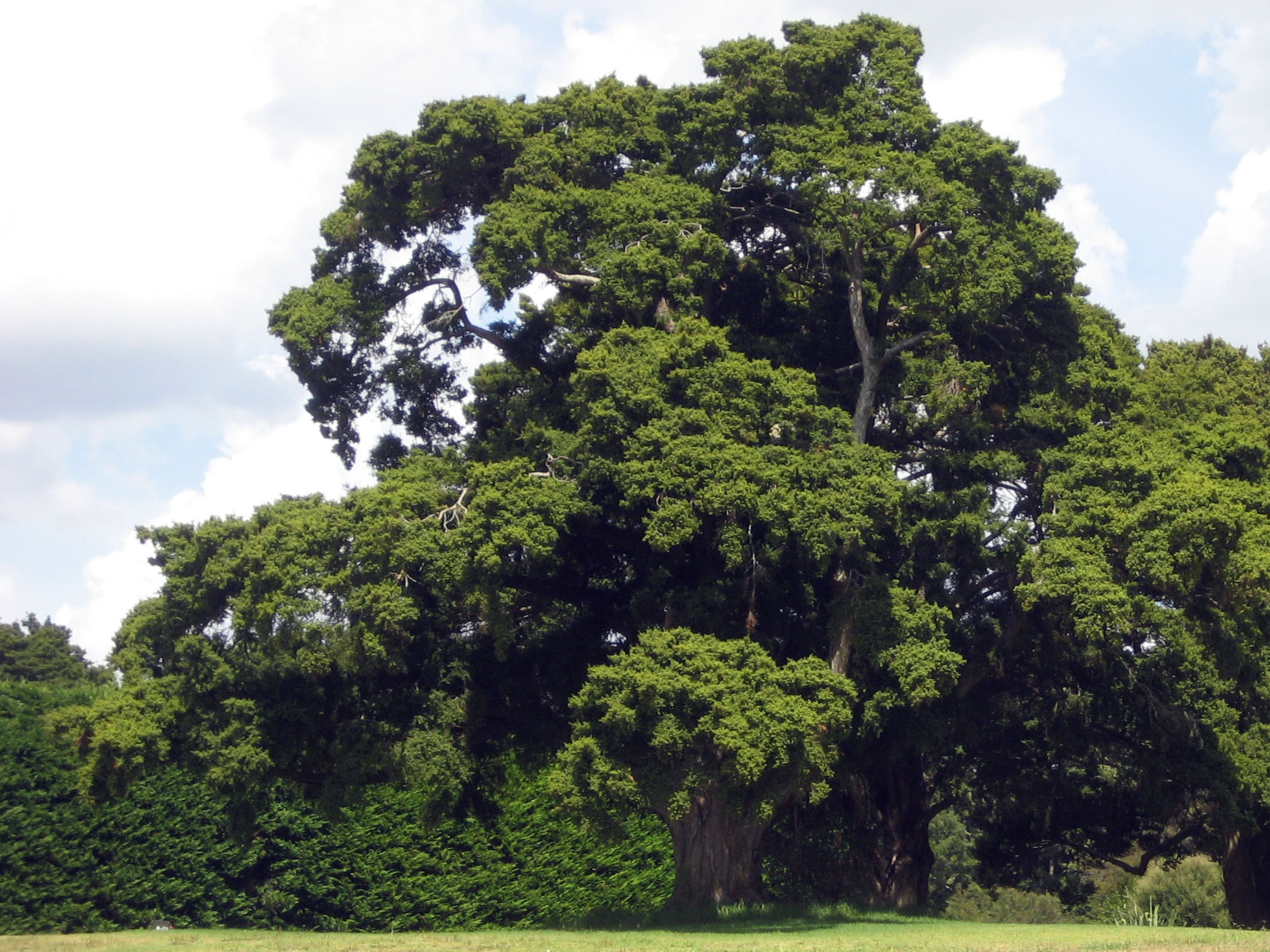
Tōtara tree

Īhenga went north to Ripiro Beach. Here, the travellers gathered toheroa, but Īhenga ate them all while the other travellers were away, so the place was named Kaihū-a-Īhenga ("Īhenga's secret meal"). At Waikereru, the travellers became thirsty, so Īhenga sung a karakia (incantations) and stamped his foot, causing a spring to burst forth and kererū to fly down to drink the water. Nearby, Īhenga's dog, Potakatawhiti was killed when a tree trunk rolled over on top of it; Īhenga performed another karakia, so that the dog's soul could go into a nearby tōtara tree, where it was still said to speak to passing travellers in 1967. Īhenga met his elder brother Warenga at Mataewaka, near Kawakawa and they went fishing together at Lake Te Tiringa. Īhenga caught inanga and kōura ("crayfish"), which he later set free in the waters at Waitepuia stream at Maketu and in Lake Rotorua.

Īhenga travelled on to Whangārei, naming places after events that happened along the way:

- Ruapekapeka ("nest of bats"), because there were many bats living in holes in the trees;
- Tapuae-haruru ("roaring footsteps"), because his footsteps were very loud here;
- Motatau ("talking to himself"), because he found himself talking to himself there;
- Te Waiwhakaata-a-Īhenga ("reflecting water of Īhenga"), because he saw his reflection in the water
- Whatitiri ("thunder"), because he performed a karakia to make it thunder here.
- Te Ahipūpū-a-Īhenga ("the pūpū fire of Īhenga"), because they cooked pūpū (cat's eye sea snails) there.

At Whangārei, Īhenga met Tahu-whakatiki, a member of the crew of the Arawa, who had settled in the Far North. Tahu-whakatiki's sons Te Whara and Hikurangi took Īhenga in a canoe past Taranga and Hauturu to Moehau in the Coromandel, where Īhenga visited his final brother, Huarere. Then he continued to Maketu, where he met with Kahumatamomoe and finally returned to Rotorua.

=== Settlement in Rotorua ===
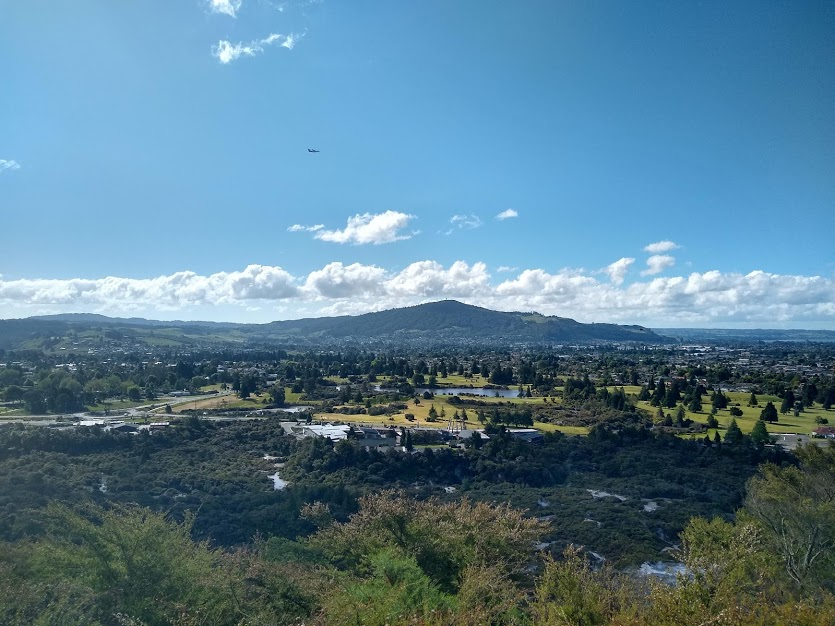
Mount Ngongotahā, seen from the south

After this journey, Īhenga established a pā (fortified village) called Whakarongo near mount Pukepoto in the Whakapoungakau range (between Lakes Rotorua and Ōkataina) and two further pā, Pateiti and Te Kahuka, nearby. Later, he moved to Ngongotahā, where he established a pā on the Waitetī stream, called Whakaeketahuna. He placed a magic whetstone for sharpening axes called Hine-tua-hōanga, which had been brought on the Arawa, at a sacred spring called Waiorotoki ("waters of the echoing axes") nearby. The stone was shown to James Cowan still in situ in 1930 and was said to have made the stream so tapu that it was fatal to drink from it.

One time, Īhenga returned from a trip away and his wife Hinetekakara was missing. He found her corpse by the shore at the edge of the lake, and he placed a memorial stone that he named Ōhinemutu, "the end of the girl," which made the place tapu. The location became the Uruika cemetery and the stone was still visible until the late 1880s. Īhenga and Tama-ihu-toroa decided that the killers were probably Tuarotorua's men, so they attacked his pā, Whaknakenake and killed the rangatira Waingahe and Te Waipoporo. They won another battle over them at Te Tokorangi and sent Tuarotorua's people back to Mokoia Island.

== Family ==
Īhenga was married to Hinetekakara, the daughter of Kahumatamomoe, and had three children:

- Tama-ihu-toroa (son), ancestor of Ngāti Tamaihutoroa, who had five sons:

- Purahokura, who was killed at the Battle of Waiwhitiinanga
- Reretoi, who was also killed at the Waiwhitiinanga. He had one son:

- Ruamano, who married Waiarohi, granddaughter of Uenukukōpako, and was therefore allowed to remain in the Rotorua region after Waiwhitiinanga. He settled at Papohatu and Pukehangi in the Tihi-o-tonga hills.

- Rongo Haua, who led part of the tribe to settle at Motuwhanake on the Waikato River, after the defeat at Waiwhitiinanga
- Rongo Hape, who also led part of the tribe to settle at Motuwhanake
- Pitaka, who played the central role in slaying the taniwha Pekehaua.

- Tuariki (son), ancestor of Te Tawera Ki Tuariki hapu of Ngāti Awa

== Bibliography ==
- Grace, John Te Herekiekie (1959). Tuwharetoa: The history of the Maori people of the Taupo District. Auckland [N.Z.]: A.H. & A.W. Reed.
- Grey, George (1855). Polynesian Mythology and Ancient Traditional History of the New Zealand race as furnished by their priests and chiefs. London: John Murray.
- Stafford, Don (1967). Te Arawa: A History of the Arawa People. Reed. ISBN 9780947506100.
