= Tuhoromatakakā =

Tuhoromatakakā was a Māori rangatira (chief) in the Te Arawa confederation of tribes, who was based at Maketu in the Bay of Plenty and then at Mount Moehau at the tip of the Coromandel Peninsula. He probably lived in the second half of the fourteenth century.

== Life ==
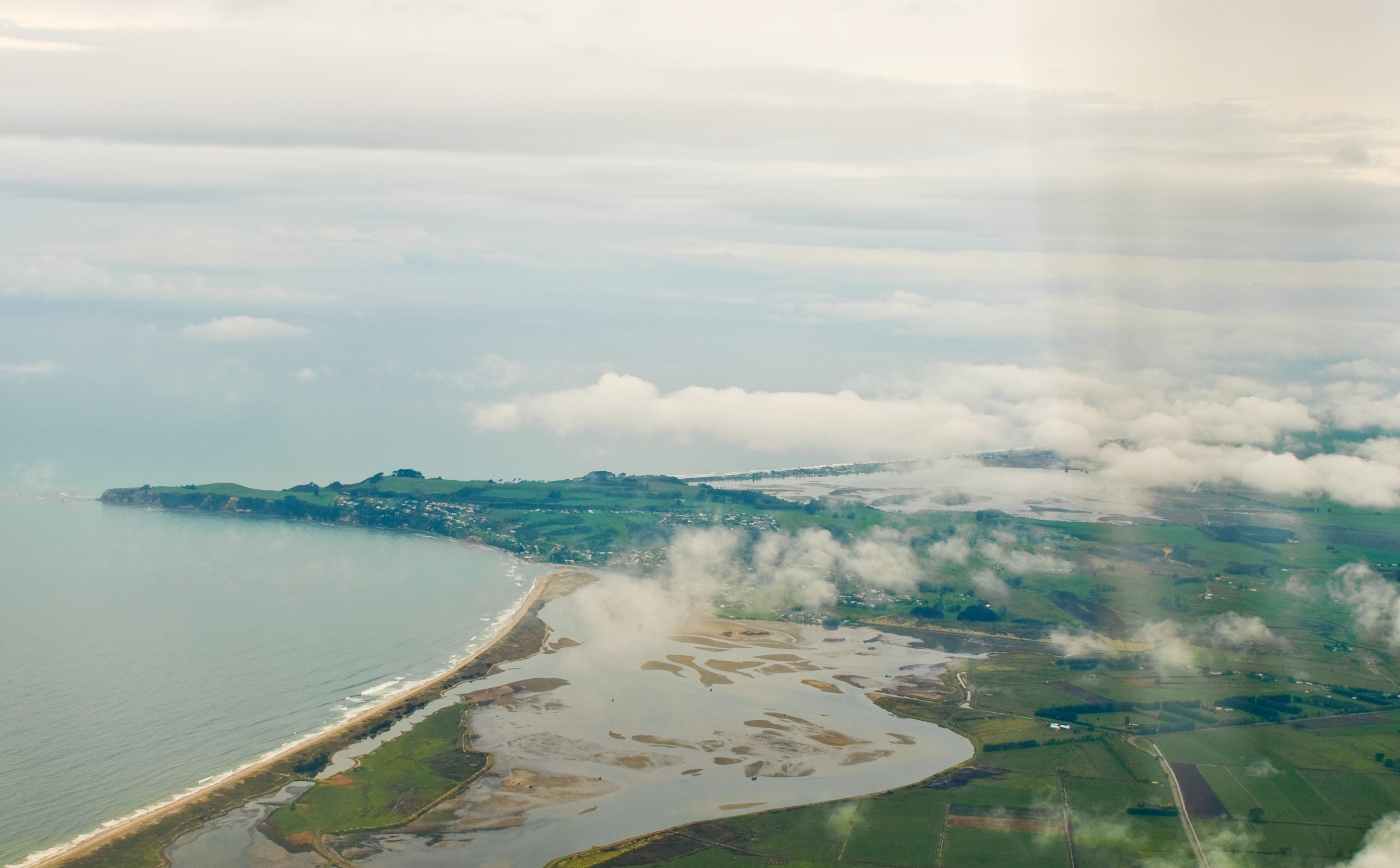
Maketu, seen from the west

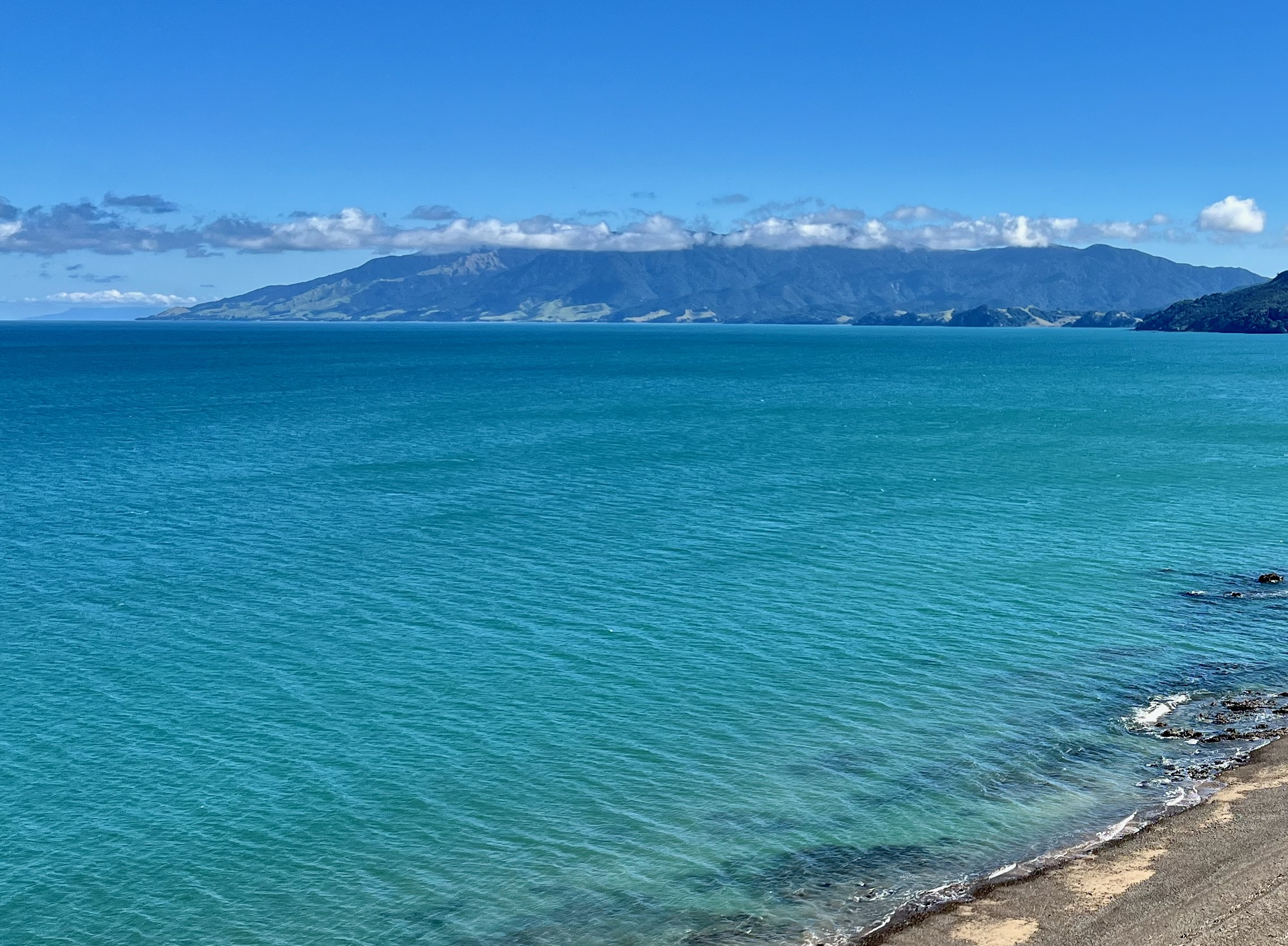
Mount Moehau, seen from the southwest

Tuhoromatakakā was born in Hawaiki as the eldest son of Tama-te-kapua. He had a younger brother, Kahumatamomoe. Both sons accompanied their father when he captained the Arawa canoe on its journey to New Zealand and settled with him at Maketu in the Bay of Plenty. There Tuhoromatakakā and Kahumatamomoe lived together in the house of Whitingakongako at the pā (fortified village) of Te Koari. Tuhoromatakakā attacked Kahumatamomoe, while the latter was working in his garden, Parawai. They fought and Kahumatamomoe won, but the people forced him to release Tuhoromatakakā because of his seniority. Kahumatamomoe threatened to kill his brother and Tuhoromatakakā attacked him again, ripping a pounamu earring called Kaukaumatua out of his ear. He buried this earring under Tama-te-kapua's house.

Kahumatamomoe disputed the ownership of a kumara patch with Tama-te-kapua, claiming that since he had cultivated the land it should be his. The people mostly agreed with Kahumatamomoe, so Tama-te-kapua decided to leave and settle at Moehau. Tuhoromatakakā accompanied him north. At Moehau, Tama-te-kapua grew sick. When he was dying, he instructed Tuhoromatakakā to bury his corpse. Afterwards, he was to keep himself tapu and reserve three fields around his house for the atua for three years, then to dig up his papa-toiake (lower spine) in order to remove the tapu. D. M. Stafford reports the karakia (incantation) sung by Tuhoromatakakā at the burial. Tuhoromatakakā sung the karakia incorrectly, omitting his father's name from the conclusion of the song. He also began to farm his fields for himself once more before three years had passed. As a result, he died.

On his deathbed, Tuhoromatakakā instructed his youngest son, Īhenga, to carry out a particular funerary ritual. Īhenga was to bite Tuhoromatakaka's forehead and perineum and then bury him next to Tama-te-kapua, in order to make him into an ikahurihuri ("twisting fish," a type of oracle). When he did this, Tuhoromatakakā's body twisted from side to side, signifying that his descendants would fail to hold their land in the Coromandel. After this, Īhenga placed Tuhoromatakakā's body in a foetal position, with his knees touching his neck, covered in him in two kahakaha cloaks, two cloaks for old men, and a dogskin cloak, placed feathers from toroa, huia, and kotuku in his hair, and toroa down in his ears. Then he buried him. In the night, Tuhoromatakakā's ghost came to Īhenga and forbade him from asking for food or water, taught him karakia, and dispatched him to Maketu to be cleansed from the tapu of the funeral at the hands of Kahumatamomoe. Later, Ngātoro-i-rangi disinterred Tama-te-kapua and Tuhoromatakakā's bodies and took them away.

== Family ==
Tuhoromatakaka married Uenuku-whakarorongarangi had four sons:

- Taramainuku, father of;

- Hinetu-te-rauniao, who settled at Kaipara and married Uenuku-mai-rarotonga, grandson of Kahumatamomoe.

- Rangitihi, ancestor of Ngāti Rangitihi.

- Warenga, who settled at Kawakawa in the Bay of Islands.
- Huarere, who remained at Moehau, ancestor of Ngāti Huarere.
- Īhenga, who married Hinetekakara, daughter of Kahumatamomoe.

== Bibliography ==
- Stafford, D.M. (1967). Te Arawa: A History of the Arawa People. Rotorua, New Zealand: A.H. & A.W. Reed.
