= Kahumatamomoe =

Māori explorer

Kahumatamomoe (Kahu for short) was a Māori rangatira (chief) in the Te Arawa confederation of tribes. He undertook several exploratory journeys around the upper North Island of New Zealand on his own and with his nephew Īhenga. Lake Rotorua's full name is Te Rotoruanui-a-Kahumatamomoe and was named by Īhenga to honour his uncle. Kahumatamomoe himself is said to have named various locales, including Horohoro, Kaipara and Waitematā Harbours. He might have lived in the late fourteenth century.

== Life ==
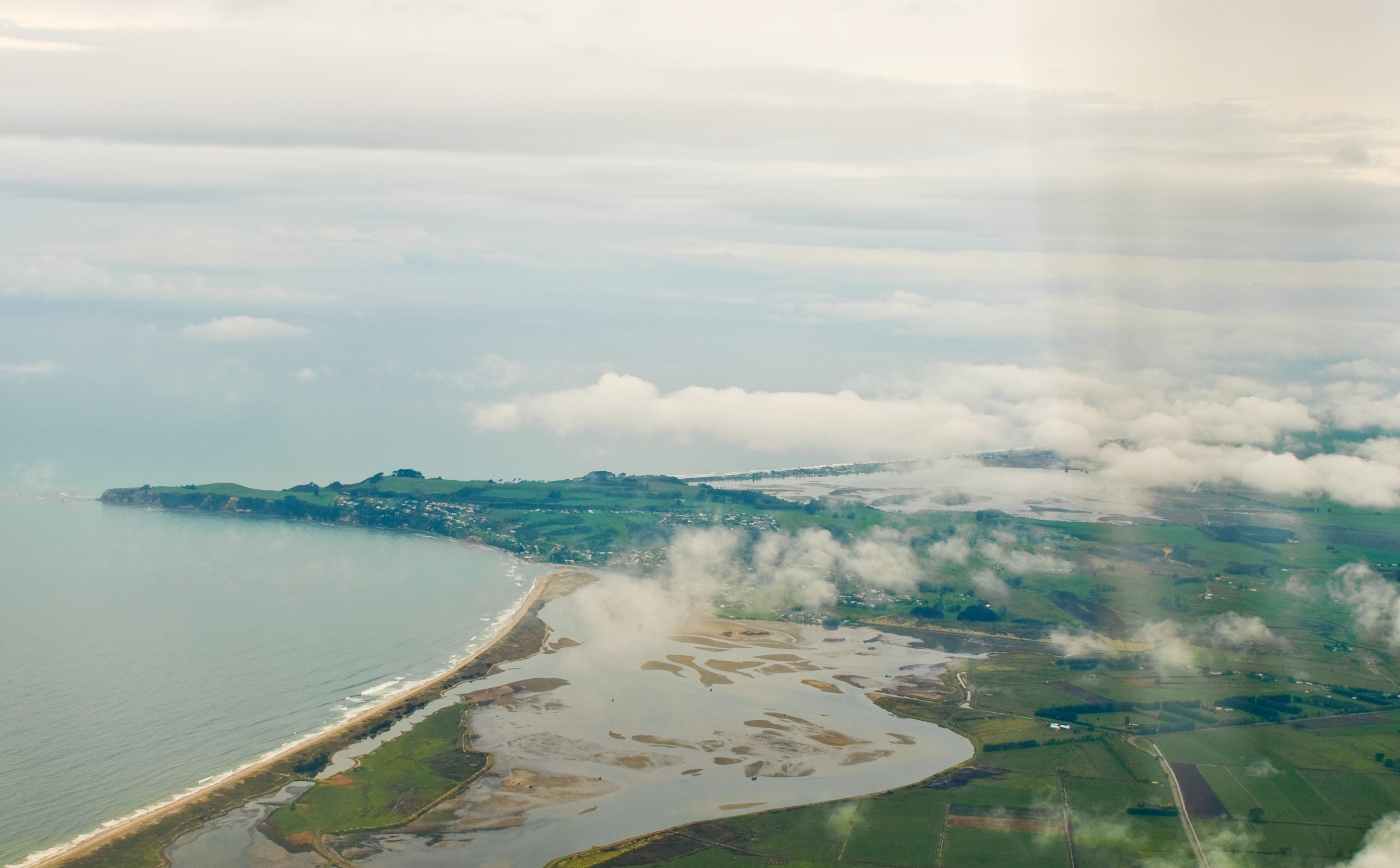
Maketu, seen from the west.

Kahumatamomoe was born in Hawaiki as the eldest son of Tama-te-kapua. He had an older brother, Tuhoromatakakā. Both sons accompanied their father when he captained the Arawa canoe on its journey to New Zealand and settled with him at Maketu in the Bay of Plenty.

=== Journey to Titiraupenga ===
Kahumatamomoe set out on an exploratory journey with Ika, one of the men from the Arawa. They went first to Lake Rotorua and visited Ika's son Marupunganui, who had settled between Kawaha Point and Ngongotahā (a little north of modern Rotorua township). They carried on to Horohoro, where Kahumatamomoe had to purify himself by washing his hands in a stream. As a result, the place was named Te Horohoroinga o nga ringa o Kahumatamomoe ("the washing of the hands of Kahumatamomoe") or Te Horohorotanga i te tapu o Kahumatamomoe. Other accounts say that this happened to Tia, not Kahumatamomoe, and that the full name of the place is Te Horohoroinga-nui-a-Tia. Kahumatamomoe and Ika carried on to Mount Haparangi, down to Lake Taupō and over to Mount Titiraupenga, where Tia had settled. Ika went on to Whanganui, but Kahumatamomoe returned to Maketu with Tia's son Tapuika.

=== Family disputes and purification of Īhenga ===
Places in the life of Kahumatamomoe
1 Maketu
2 Horohoro
3 Mount Titiraupenga
4 Lake Rotoiti
5 Ngongotahā
6 Kaipara
7 Waitematā
8 Mount Moehau

After this journey, Kahumatamomoe settled down with Tuhoromatakakā near Maketu in a house called Whitingakongako in the pā (fortified village) of Te Koari. Tuhoromatakakā attacked Kahumatamomoe, while the latter was working in his garden, Parawai. They fought and Kahumatamomoe won, but the people forced him to release Tuhoromatakakā because of his seniority. Kahumatamomoe threatened to kill his brother and Tuhoromatakakā attacked him again, ripping a pounamu earring called Kaukaumatua out of his ear. He buried this earring under Tama-te-kapua's house.

Kahumatamomoe disputed the ownership of a kumara patch with Tama-te-kapua, claiming that since he had cultivated the land it should be his. The people mostly agreed with Kahumatamomoe, so Tama-te-kapua decided to leave and settle at Moehau. Tuhoromatakakā accompanied him north. Tama-te-kapua died at Moehau and Tuhoromatakakā died shortly afterwards, as a result of breaching tapu. Tuhoromatakakā's son Īhenga carried out the funeral for his father and then came to Maketu, to ask Kahumatamomoe to lift the tapu of the funeral from him.

Īhenga snuck into Kahumatamomoe's house and seated himself on Kahumatamomoe's pillow, a sacred spot. When he heard of this, Kahumatamomoe came storming in, intending to kill the invader for the insult, but he recognised Īhenga as his nephew, welcomed him, and cleansed him of the tapu. First, he washed him in the Kaituna River. Then he carried out the pure ritual, cutting off Īhenga's hair and tying it to a stone which was deposited in a sacred place. Then his daughter presented them with a meal of kumara, carefully averting her face so that she did not breathe in any of the steam; Kahumatamomoe gave Īhenga some of the kohukohu moss in which the kumara had been cooked and led him in offering it to stone images and to their deceased relatives. Finally, Kahumatamomoe spat on the kohukohu and offered it to Tama-te-kapua. D. M. Stafford gives translations of the karakia (incantations) that were sung during these rituals. After the purification, Kahumatamomoe allowed Īhenga to marry his daughter Hinetekakara. Īhenga dug up the pounamu earring that his father had ripped from Kahumatamomoe's ear and gave it to his new wife. Seeing this, Kahumatamomoe mourned for his brother and granted the earring to his daughter.

=== Journey to Rotorua ===
Īhenga went on several journeys before and after the birth of his son, Tama-ihu-toroa. On one of these journeys he discovered Lake Rotorua and named it Te Rotoruanui-a-Kahumatamomoe and was named by Ihenga to honour his uncle. On his return to Maketu, Īhenga declared that the area belonged to Kahumatamomoe and convinced him to come and settle there. First, Īhenga brought Kahumatamomoe to Lake Rotoiti, which he gave to him. Later, Kahumatamomoe removed a kākā feather (hou kākā) from his top knot and placed it in the ground to be a protective taniwha, so the place was named Ohoukaka. As they were travelling along in their canoe, Kahumatamomoe suddenly undressed, leapt into the water, and swam to a beach. His grandsons laughed and said "See, there go Kahu's legs," so the place was named Kūwhārua-o-Kahu ("two thighs of Kahu"). They built a whata (raised food store) near Tuarahiwiroa and named the place Te Whata. Passing the hot springs, Te Pera-o-tangaroa, and Waiohiro stream, they arrived at Ngongotahā (called Parawai by Kahumatamomoe).

=== Journey to Kaipara ===
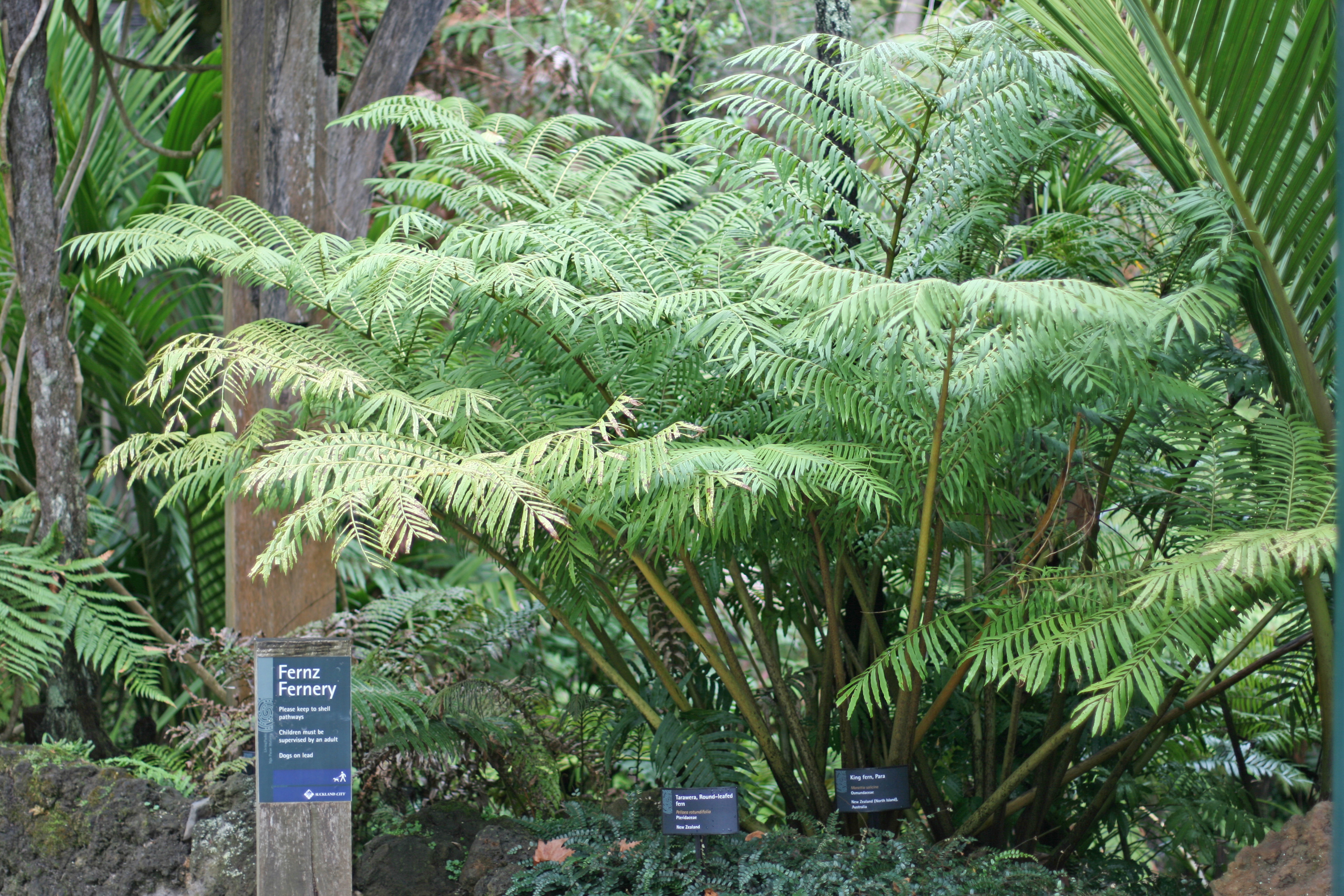
Para fern, namesake of Kaipara.

Two years later, Kahumatamomoe decided to make a trip to visit his nephew Taramainuku, Īhenga's older brother, who now lived at Kaipara in Northland. He was accompanied by Īhenga and Tawake-moe-tahanga. At one point on the journey, they rested under a rātā tree and Kahumatamomoe named the place Te Whakamarumaru o Kahu ("The sun-shade of Kahu"); Īhenga responded by naming the place Te Ure o Tūhoro ("The penis of Tūhoro") after his own father, because he saw a mataī tree with a penis-like growth on its trunk. Further on, their dog caught a kākāpō at a spot which they named Te Kākāpō. Kahumatamomoe named Matanuku after the lyrics of a karakia called Uruuruwhenua. After crossing the Waikato River, the younger men became very slow, so Kahumatamomoe named the spot Māngere ("lazy"). They crossed the Waipa River, passed Mount Pirongia and Waingaroa and came to Port Waikato, where they met Ohomairangi, an uncle of Kahumatamomoe, who had come to New Zealand on the Tainui. To the north, Kahumatamomoe set up a mānuka post as a rahui (sacred marker) and named the place Manuka (which might be Manukau). They travelled north to Kaipara Harbour by sea, the others in a canoe, and Kahumatamomoe on the back of a taniwha called Paikea.

At Kaipara, the travellers met with Taramainuku and he gave them his daughter Hinetu-te-rauniao, to be married to Kahumatamomoe's grandson Uenuku-mai-rarotonga. The travellers were presented with a great feast, including baskets of para fern. Kahumatamomoe was so impressed with the para, which he had never had before, that he named the region Kaipara ("eat para").

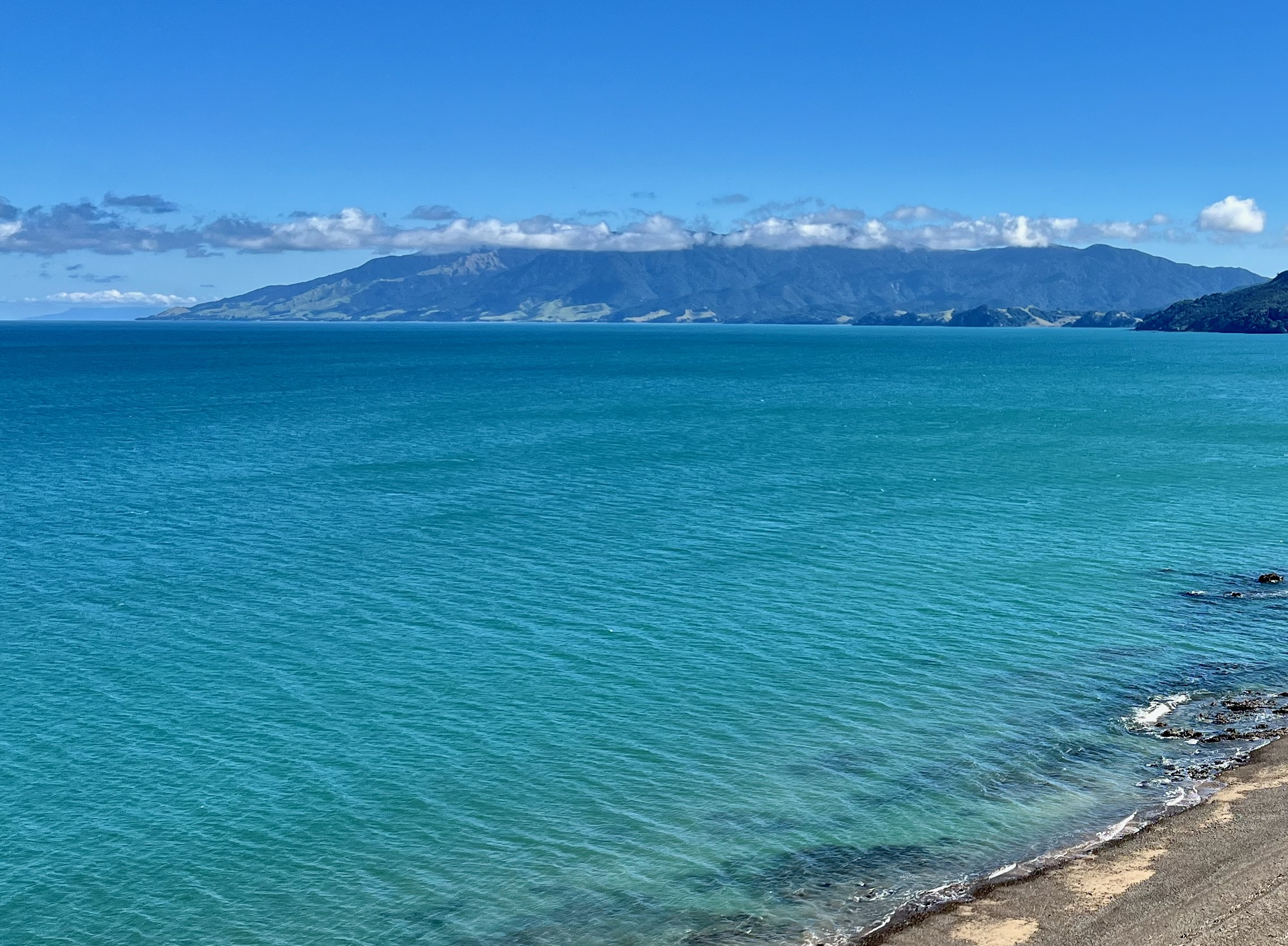
Mount Moehau, seen from the southwest.

After this, Kahumatamomoe began his journey home, travelling to Waitematā Harbour, where he placed a mauri stone on Boat Rock. The name Waitematā ("Waters of [Kahu]mata[momoe]") refers to this event. He boarded a canoe at Takapuna, passed Motuihe and Paritu on Waiheke Island, and came to Moehau, where his father and brother had been buried. There he met another nephew, Huarere, who informed him that his father and brother's bodies had both been disinterred and taken away. He named the mountain Moehau-o-Tama ("Sleeping spirit of Tama-te-kapua") and declared the area sacred and off-limits. On the shore he sand a lament for his brother at Tangi-aro-o-Kahu ("facing lament of Kahu"), visited the memorial stone for his brother at Te Kohatu-whakairi-a-Ngatoro, placed a stone on top of a hill called Tokatea. He named a bay where they saw aua fish Waiaua. He praised Huarere's land and departed.

Kahumatamomoe rested and enjoyed the breeze at Muri-aroha-o-Kahu ("Kahu's sighs of love") on the Waihou River. He stopped on a mountain and looked back mournfully to Moehau and forward to Titiraupenga where Tia and Māka had settled, so the peak was named Aroha-tai-o-Kahu (Kahu's seaward love) and Aroha-uta-o-Kahu (Kahu's landward love). Travelling along the Tauohanga Range, he came to a forest, where he chanted a song to make it stop raining and the place was named Pātere-o-Kahu (The chant of Kahu or the drenching of Kahu). Finally, he arrived at Parawai.

Immediately after his return, Hinetekakara told Kahumatamomoe that Marupunganui, the rangatira on Mokoia Island in the middle of Lake Rotorua had left his island. Therefore he took a canoe over and remonstrated Marupunganui's son Tuarotorua, reminding him not to leave the island. From there, he took the canoe to Toanga, and travelled through the forest on foot. When his grandson was thirsty, he sung a karakia and stomped on the ground, causing a spring to burst forth at Te Waitakahi-a-Kahu (The water of the stomping of Kahu). Finally, he came to Maketu, where he was visited once more by Īhenga, before he died of old age.

== Family ==
Kahumatamomoe had two children:

- A son called Tawake-moe-tahanga, who married Tuparewhaitaita, daughter of Hatupatu,

- Uenuku-mai-Rarotonga who married Whakaotirangi (not the same Whakaotirangi who came to New Zealand on the Arawa or Tainui canoes).

- Rangitihi, ancestor of Ngāti Rangitihi.

- A daughter called Hinetekakara, who marred Īhenga and had children.

== Bibliography ==
- Locke, Samuel (1882). "Historical Traditions of Taupo and East Coast Tribes". Transactions and Proceedings of the Royal Society of New Zealand. 15: 433–459.
- Stafford, Don (1967). Te Arawa: A History of the Arawa People. Reed. ISBN 9780947506100.
