= Tama-te-kapua =

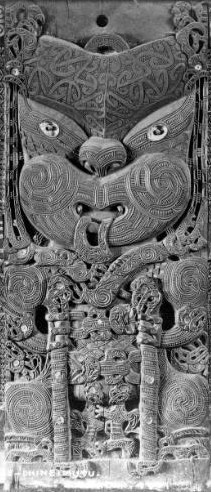
Tama-te-kapua, depicted in a carving at Tamatekapua meeting house in Ohinemutu, Rotorua, circa 1880. Tama-te-kapua is holding the stilts he used to steal fruit from Uenuku.

In Māori tradition of New Zealand, Tama-te-kapua, also spelt Tamatekapua and Tama-te-Kapua and also known as Tama, was the captain of the Arawa canoe which came to New Zealand from Polynesia in about 1350. A trickster, his theft of fruit from the orchard of the chieftain Uenuku escalated into a feud which forced him to leave the ancestral homeland of Hawaiki. On departure, he kidnapped Whakaotirangi, the wife of Ruaeo, and the priest Ngātoro-i-rangi. During the journey he was discovered sleeping with the wife of Ngātoro-i-rangi, who almost destroyed the canoe in revenge. When he arrived in New Zealand, he tricked the crew of the Tainui into believing that he had arrived before them. He staked claims to Mount Moehau in the Coromandel Peninsula and to Maketu in the central Bay of Plenty, where he settled. Shortly after this, he was defeated by the vengeful Ruaeo and feuded with his son Kahumatamomoe, departing to Moehau, where he died.

== Life ==
Tama-te-kapua was said to be very tall – 2.7 metres (9 ft). He was born in Hawaiki, the ancestral home of the Polynesian people. His father was Haumai-tāwhiti (also spelt Houmai Tawhiti), a direct descendant of Ohomairangi, the founder of the Ngati Ohomairangi tribe, and his mother was Tuikakapa.

=== Hawaiki ===
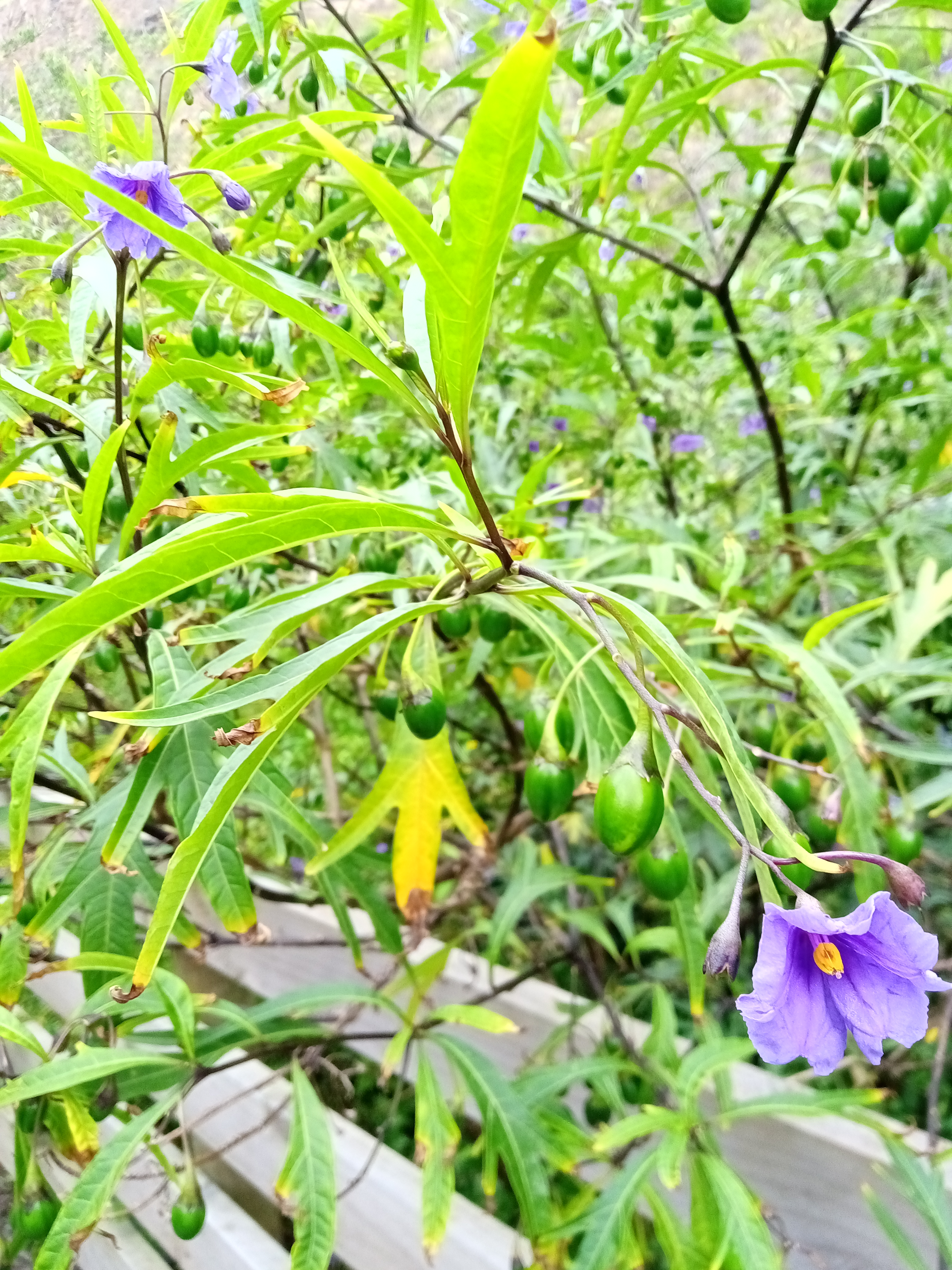
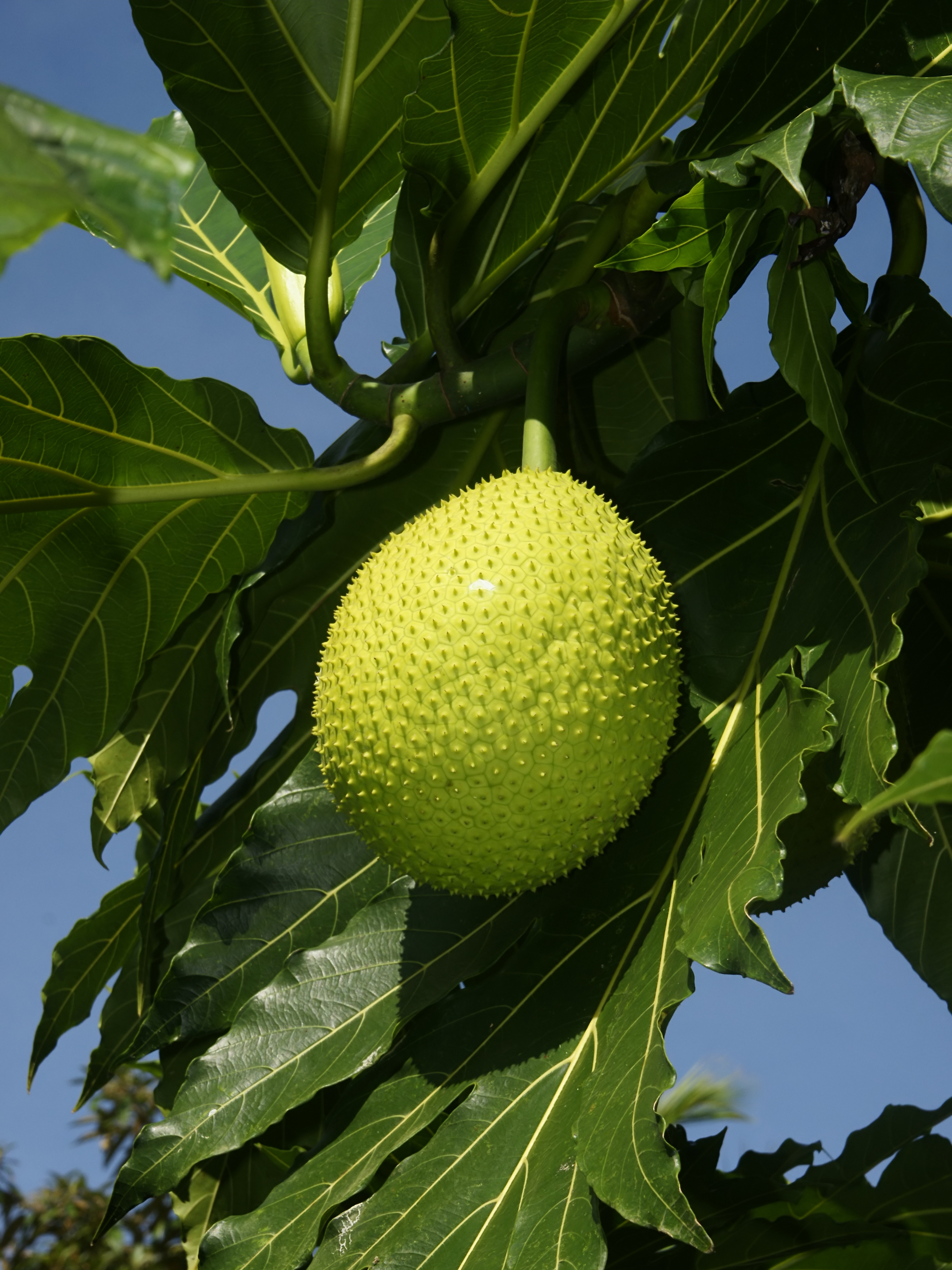
Left: Solanum aviculare (poroporo). Right: breadfruit (kuru).

The chief Uenuku suffered from an ulcer and gave off a discharge, which was buried secretly because it was highly tapu, but a dog called Potakatawhiti, which belonging to Haumai-tāwhiti dug this material up and ate it. Uenuku and Toi-te-huatahi killed the dog and ate it. Tama-te-kapua and his brother Whakaturia went searching for the dog and discovered what had happened when they heard it howling from within Toi-te-huatahi's stomach.

In revenge, Tama-te-kapua and his brother Whakaturia stole fruit from a tree belonging to Uenuku. Most accounts say that the fruit was poporo (Solanum aviculare), but one waiata calls it kuru (a common Polynesian name for breadfruit, a plant that does not grow in New Zealand). In another version, the stolen crop is kumara. Each night, they entered Uenuku's garden on stilts, so that they left no tracks, and stole all the ripe fruit. Eventually, Uenuku ambushed the pair and captured Whakaturia, but Tama-te-kapua made it to the sea shore, where he managed to escape.

Uenuku and his people decided to execute Whakaturia by tying him to one of the roof rafters above the fire of Uenuku's house, so that he would die painfully from smoke inhalation. Tama-te-kapua climbed up on top of the roof undetected and told Whakaturia to shout down to the people in the house that their singing and dancing were very bad and that he could do far better than them. They let him down and he danced out the door, which Tama-te-kapua then locked, so that Uenuku's men could not follow them as they escaped.

In revenge Uenuku and Toi-te-huatahi attacked the village of Ngati Ohomairangi, which was repelled only thanks to invocations by Haumai-tāwhiti, Tama-te-kapua, and Whakaturia. The two brothers decided to flee to Aotearoa, which had been discovered by Ngāhue of the Tāwhirirangi canoe.

=== Voyage to Aotearoa ===
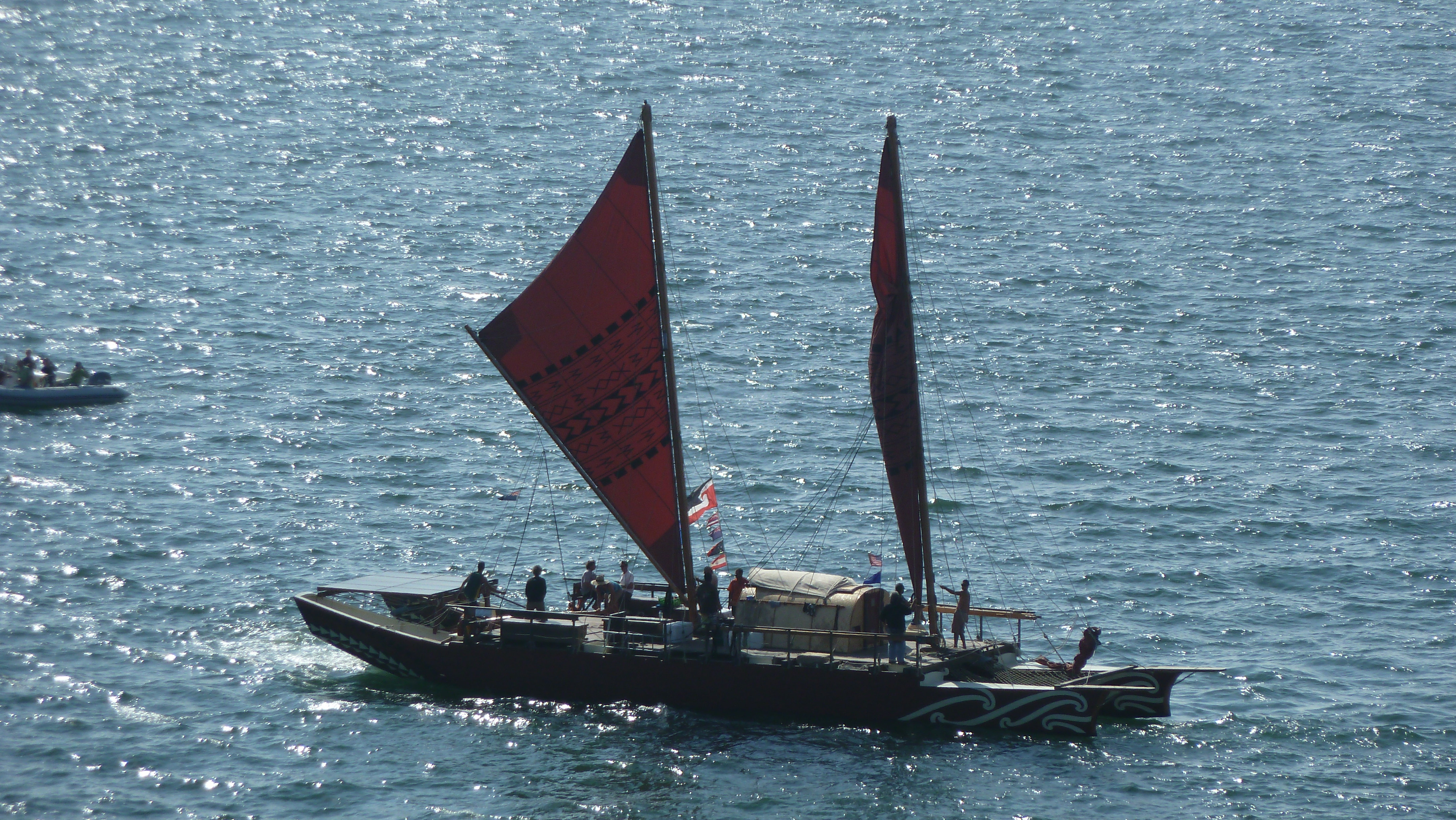
Te Haunui, a modern reconstruction of a sea-going waka (canoe).

Tama-te-kapua ordered the construction of a canoe (waka), which was completed and berthed in Whenuakura Bay, along with the Tainui. Tama-te-kapua named his canoe Ngā rākau kotahi puu a Atua Matua (also known as Ngā rākau maatahi puu a Atua Matua or Ngā rākau rua a Atuamatua "the two trunks of Atuamatua") in memory of Tama-te-kapua's grandfather Atua-matua. Takaanui Tarakawa records the song of farewell (poroporoaki) sung by Haumai-tāwhiti.

Tama-te-kapua had fallen in love with Whakaotirangi, who was married to Ruaeo, so, when the canoe was ready to depart, he told Ruaeo that he was missing his sacred axe, Tutauru, and asked him to go back to his house to collect it. While Ruaeo was away, Tama-te-kapua set sail, leaving Ruaeo behind. Some legends say that Tama-te-kapua also kidnapped Ngātoro-i-rangi, who was a tohunga and navigator of the Tainui waka, by inviting him to come aboard the Arawa with his wife Kearoa to bless the vessel, and casting anchor as soon as they were on board. In the Tainui account recorded by Pei Te Hurinui Jones, Ngātoro-i-rangi initially travelled on the Tainui and was kidnapped after the two canoes had rendezvoused in Raratonga.

During the voyage, Tama-te-kapua became enamoured with Kearoa. Ngātoro-i-rangi noticed this and guarded his wife during the night while he was on deck navigating, by tying one end of a cord to her hair and holding the other end in his hand. But Tama-te-kapua untied the cord from Kearoa's hair and attached it to the bed, so that he could have sex with her without being detected. One night he was nearly caught in the act by Ngātoro-i-rangi, but managed to escape, though forgetting the cord in his haste. Ngātoro-i-rangi found the cord and deduced that Tama-te-kapua had been with Kearoa. In revenge, he raised a huge whirlpool in the sea named Te korokoro-o-te-Parata ('The throat of Te Parata'). The waka was about to be lost with all on board, but someone shouted "the pillow of Kae has fallen" (ka taka te urunga o Kae), a proverbial expression in times of disaster and Ngātoro-i-rangi mercifully relented, calming the seas. George Grey and Edward Shortland record versions of the karakia (incantation) that he sung to do this.

During these events, all the kūmara on board the canoe were lost overboard, except a few in a small kete being held by Whakaotirangi. After the calming of the seas, a shark (known as an arawa) was seen in the water. Ngātoro-i-rangi renamed the waka Te Arawa, after this shark, which then accompanied the waka to Aotearoa, acting as a kai-tiaki (guardian).

=== Landfall ===
Places visited by Tama-te-Kapua
1 Whangaparāoa
2 Whakaari (White Island)
3 Mount Moehau
4 Maketu
5 Tauranga
6 Katikati
7 Whakahau
8 Whitianga
9 Tangiaro

The Arawa made landfall in New Zealand at Whangaparaoa near Cape Runaway in Te Moana-a-Toi (the Bay of Plenty). After they had landed, the crew discovered that the Tainui canoe had already landed nearby. They also found a beached sperm whale. Tama-te-kapua built a tūāhu altar out of weathered materials and tied the canoe to the jaw of the whale, covering the rope with sand, as if it had been covered up by the tide. He pointed these things out to the crew of Tainui and convinced them that Arawa had actually arrived first. This incident is the subject of much dispute between Arawa and Tainui, who tell a similar story, but with the roles reversed.

=== Claiming Moehau and Maketu ===
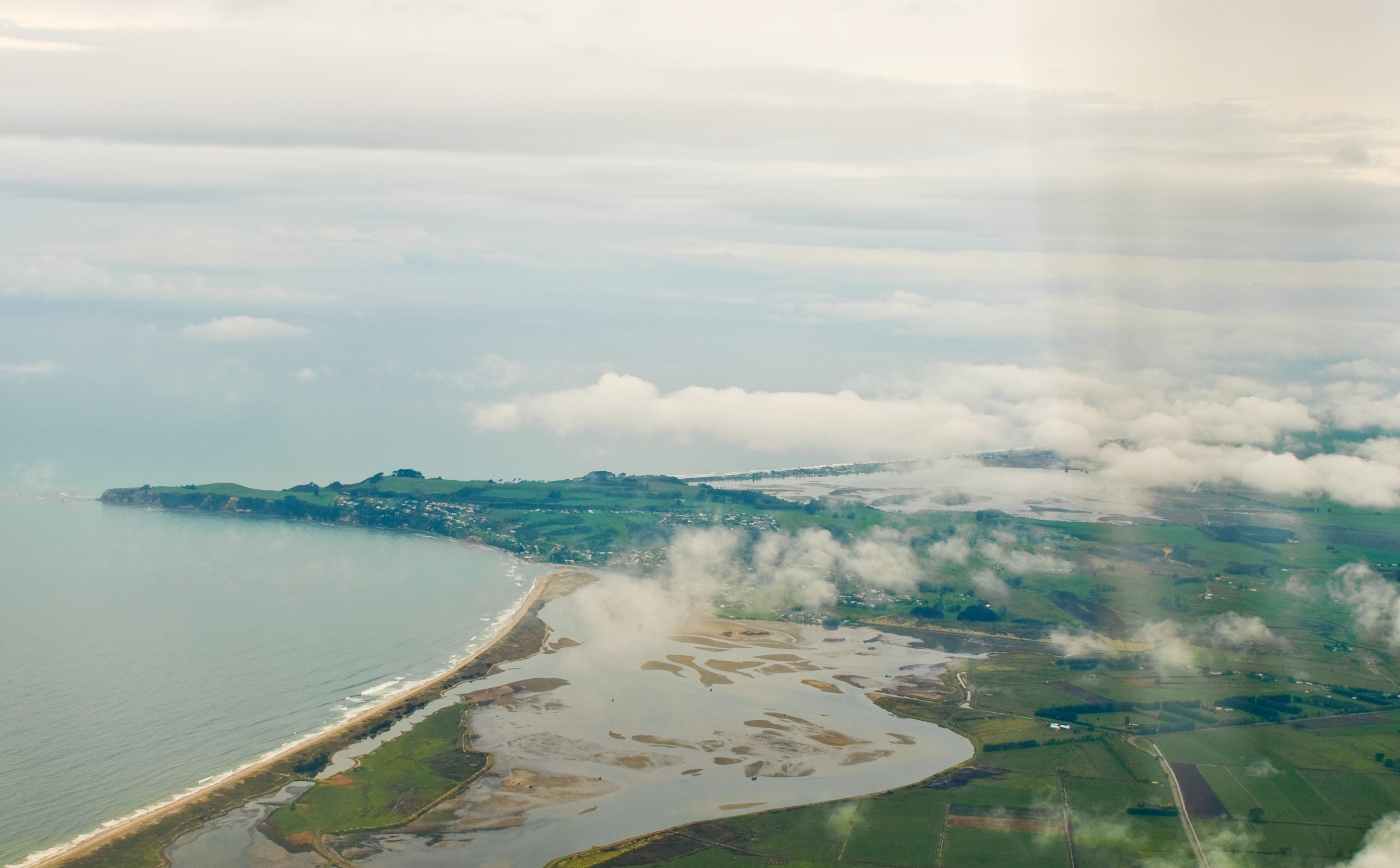
Maketu, seen from the west.

The canoe then travelled north up the coast, past Whakaari (White Island), to the Coromandel Peninsula, where Tama-te-kapua first sighted Mount Moehau (on Cape Colville, the northernmost tip of Coromandel Peninsula) and laid claim to it as his home and final resting place. At the island Te Poito o te Kupenga a Taramainuku just off the coast, Ngātoro-i-rangi deposited the tapu kōhatu (sacred stone), holding the mauri to protect the Arawa peoples and their descendants from evil. Heading south again, the Arawa continued until Tama-te-kapua caught sight of the Maketu peninsula, which he staked a claim to, declaring it to be "the bridge of my nose." Other members of the crew began claiming the land: Tia declared the area north of Maketu to be the belly of his son Tapuika and Hei called the next hill north of that the belly of his son Waitaha. They brought the Arawa up the Kaituna River at Maketu, tying the bow to a rock called Tokaparore and the stern with an anchor called Tuterangiharuru. Both rocks are features of the landscape today. This landfall took place in December.

Shortly after they arrived, Ruaeo arrived in the Pukateawainui, seeking revenge on Tama-te-kapua for having kidnapped his wife. Ruaeo's men surrounded the crew of the Arawa in the night. Then Ruaeo whacked the canoe with his taiaha, waking everyone up, and challenged Tama-te-kapua to fight. In the end Ruaeo was victorious and demonstrated his victory by rubbing "vermin" over Tama-te-kapua's face. Then he departed, taking a group of men off towards Lake Rotorua along the Te Kaharoa-a-Taunga trail (roughly equivalent to modern State Highway 33). He left Whakaoterangi with Tama-te-kapua.

=== Return to Moehau and death ===
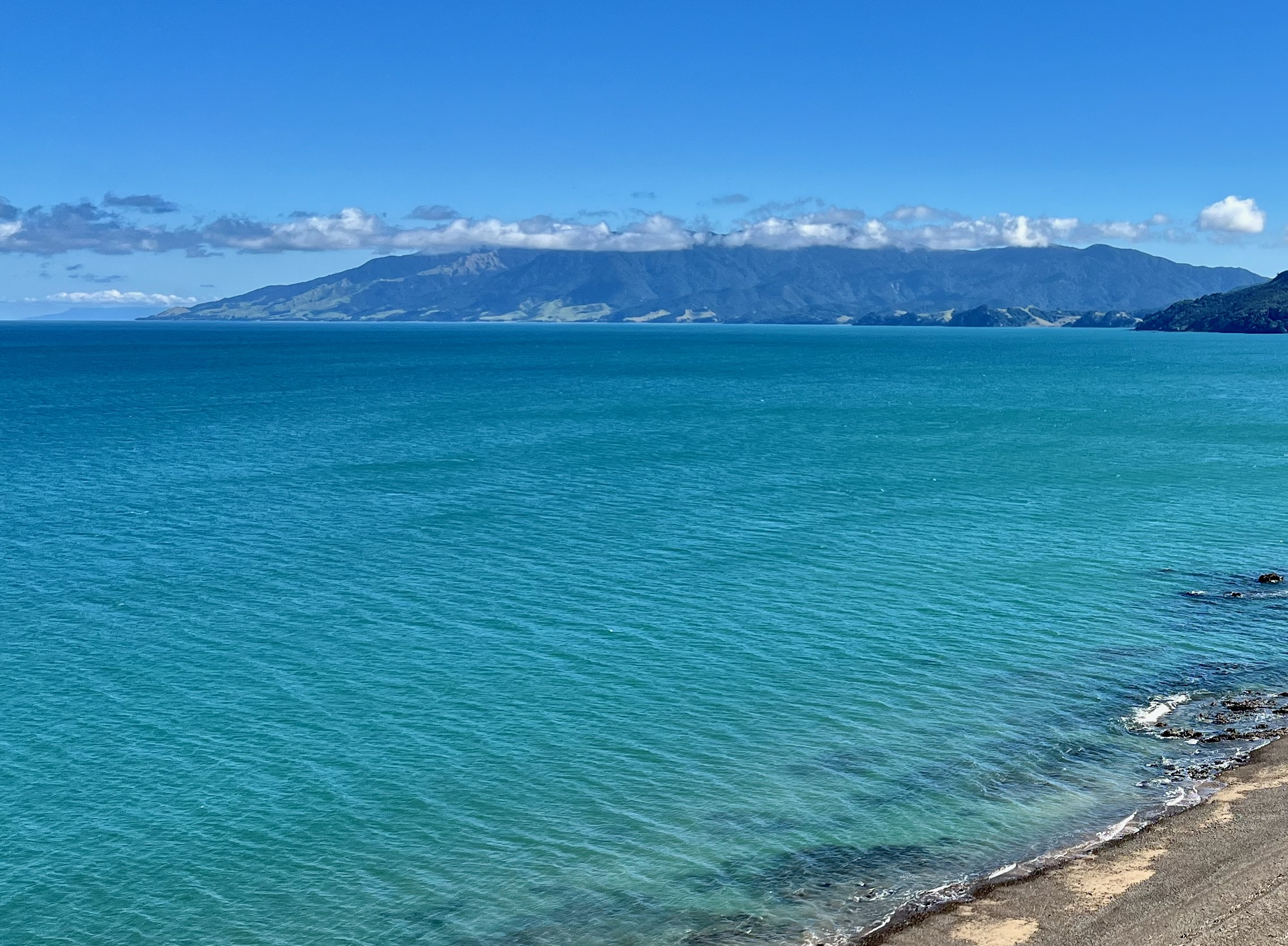
Mount Moehau, seen from the southwest.

Tama-te-kapua remained at Maketu while various other groups set out to explore the island, including Tia, Ngātoro-i-rangi, Ika, and Tama-te-kapua's son Kahumatamomoe. When Kahumatamomoe returned to Maketu he disputed the ownership of a kumara patch with Tama-te-kapua, claiming that since he had cultivated the land it should be his. The people mostly agreed with Kahumatamomoe, so Tama-te-kapua decided to leave and settle at Moehau. He was accompanied by his elder son Tuhoromatakaka and the tohunga Ngātoro-i-rangi. On the journey, they encountered Taikehu fishing at Tauranga, which they therefore named Te Ranga-a-Taikehu. They stopped to eat at Katikati and Tama-te-kapua took so long to finish his meal that the place was named Te Katikati a Tama-te-kapua ("the nibbling of Tama-te-kapua"). At the next stop, they ordered food to be prepared, but did not eat it, so the place was called Whakahau ("making excess"). They crossed the bay at Whitianga ("crossing place") and stopped at Tangiaro, where Ngātoro-i-rangi set up a sacred stone to establish their claim to the land, before returning to the Bay of Plenty region. Tama-te-kapua settled at Moehau.

Tama-te-kapua died at Moehau and was buried at the top of the mountain. When Tama-te-kapua was dying, he instructed Tuhoromatakaka to bury his corpse and keep himself and his farms tapu for three years, then to dig up his papa-toiake (lower spine) in order to remove the tapu. D. M. Stafford reports the karakia (incantation) sung by Tuhoromatakaka at the burial. Tuhoromatakaka sung the karakia incorrectly and did not wait three years before he began to farm for himself once more. As a result, he died and was buried alongside his father. Later, Ngātoro-i-rangi disinterred Tama-te-kapua and Tuhoromatakakā's bodies and took them away.

== Family and commemoration ==
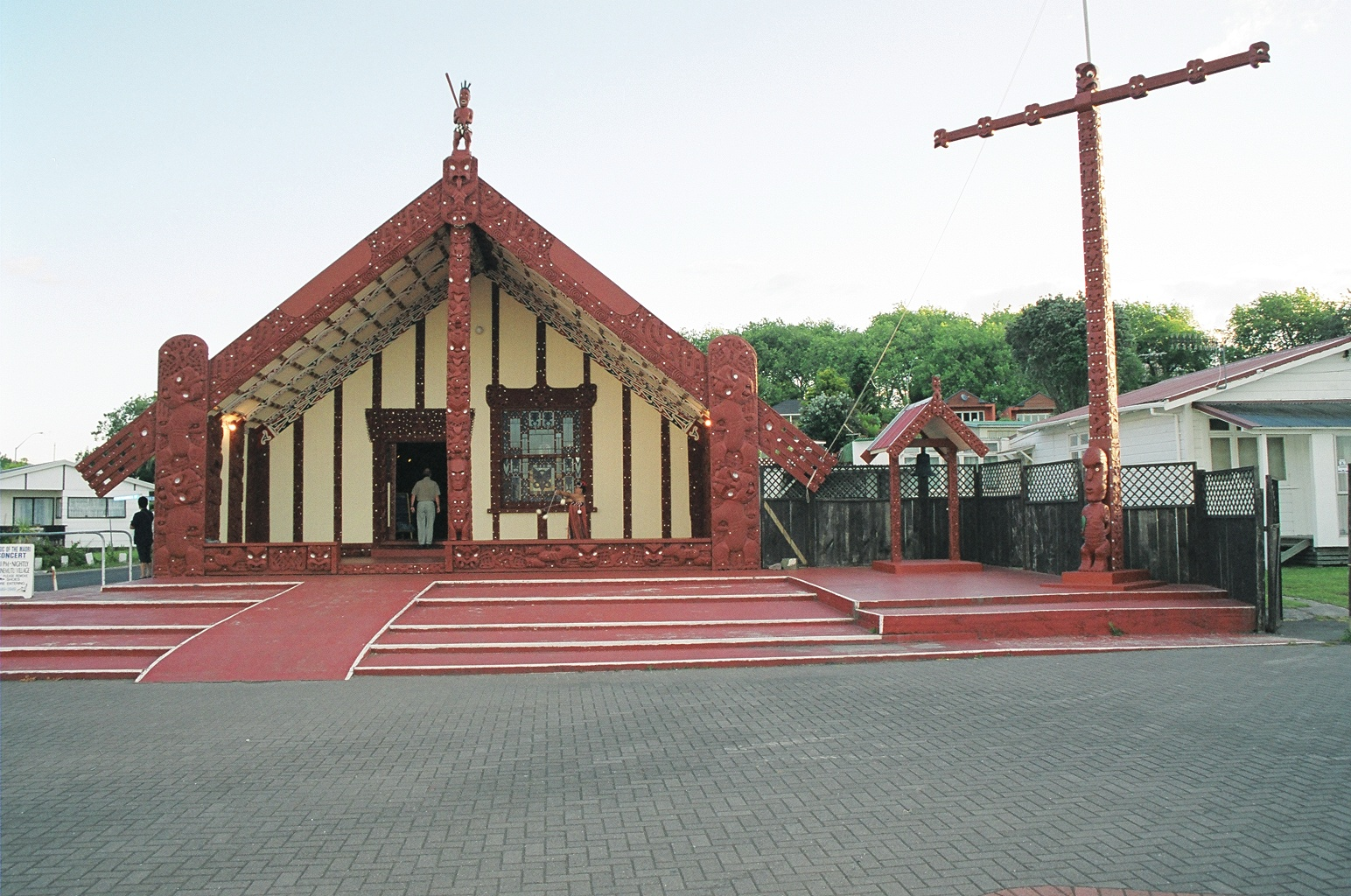
Tamatekapua meeting house at Te Papaiouru Marae, Rotorua.

Tama-te-kapua had two sons, Tuhoromatakaka and Kahumatamomoe. His descendants peopled the Bay of Plenty and Rotorua regions. Today they say that the bow of the Arawa canoe is Maketu and the stern is Mount Tongariro.

The meeting house at Te Papaiouru Marae is named after Tamatekapua.

== Bibliography ==
- Buck, Peter Te Rangihiroa (1958). The Coming of the Maori. Wellington.
- Jones, Pei Te Hurinui; Biggs, Bruce (2004). Ngā iwi o Tainui : nga koorero tuku iho a nga tuupuna = The traditional history of the Tainui people. Auckland [N.Z.]: Auckland University Press. ISBN 1869403312.
- Stafford, D.M. (1967). Te Arawa: A History of the Arawa People. Rotorua, New Zealand: A.H. & A.W. Reed.
- Shortland, E. (1856). Traditions and Superstitions of the New Zealanders. London.
- Steedman, J.A.W. He Toto: Te Ahu Matua a Nga Tupuna.
- Walker, Ranginui (2004). "Nga Korero o Nehera". Ka Whawhai Tonu Matou - Struggle Without End (Second ed.). Auckland, New Zealand: Penguin Books. p. 44. ISBN 9780143019459.
