= Tia (Māori explorer) =

Māori explorer

Tia's route
1 Maketu
2 Kaharoa
3 Lake Rotorua
4 Horohoro
5 Whakamaru
6 Mount Titiraupenga
7 Ātiamuri
8 Aratiatia, near Wairakei
9 Pākā Bay
10 (Mount Tauhara)
11 Motutere
12 Tokaanu
13 Mount Hauhungaroa
14 Mount Hurakia

In Māori traditions, Tia was an early Māori explorer of Aotearoa New Zealand and a rangatira (chief) in the Arawa tribal confederation. Through his descendants, he is an ancestor of the Tapuika and Ngāti Tūwharetoa iwi (tribes). He is responsible for the names of various features and settlements around the central North Island, most notably Lake Taupō. He might have lived around 1400.

== Life ==
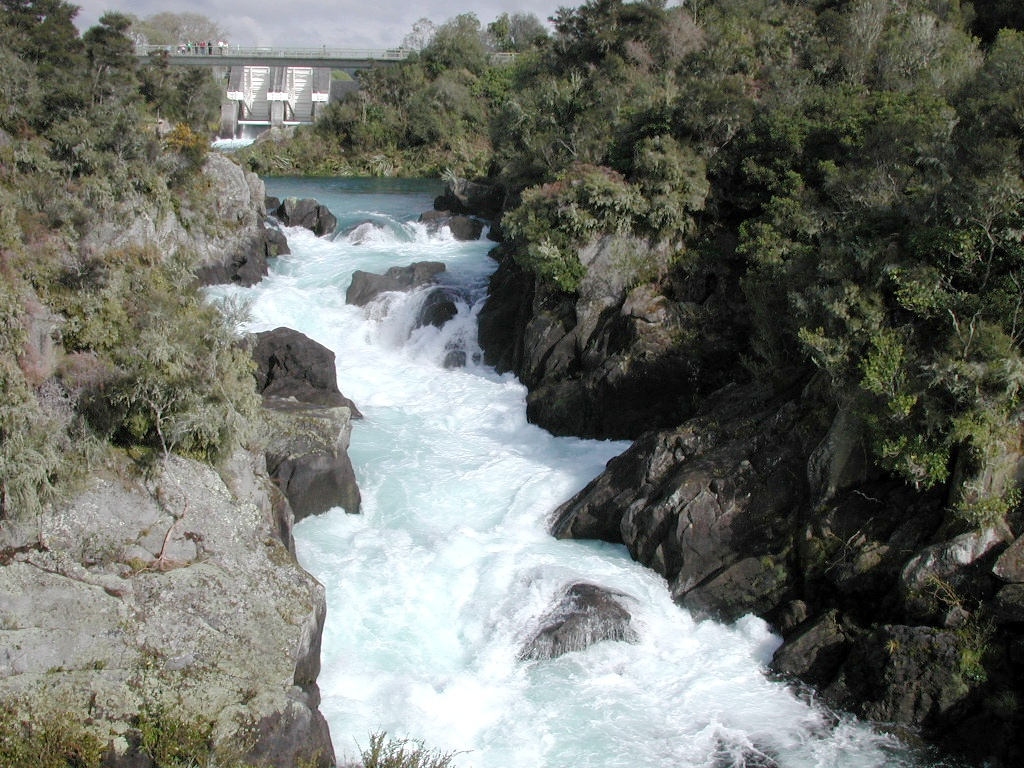
The rapids of Aratiatia (Tia's stairway).

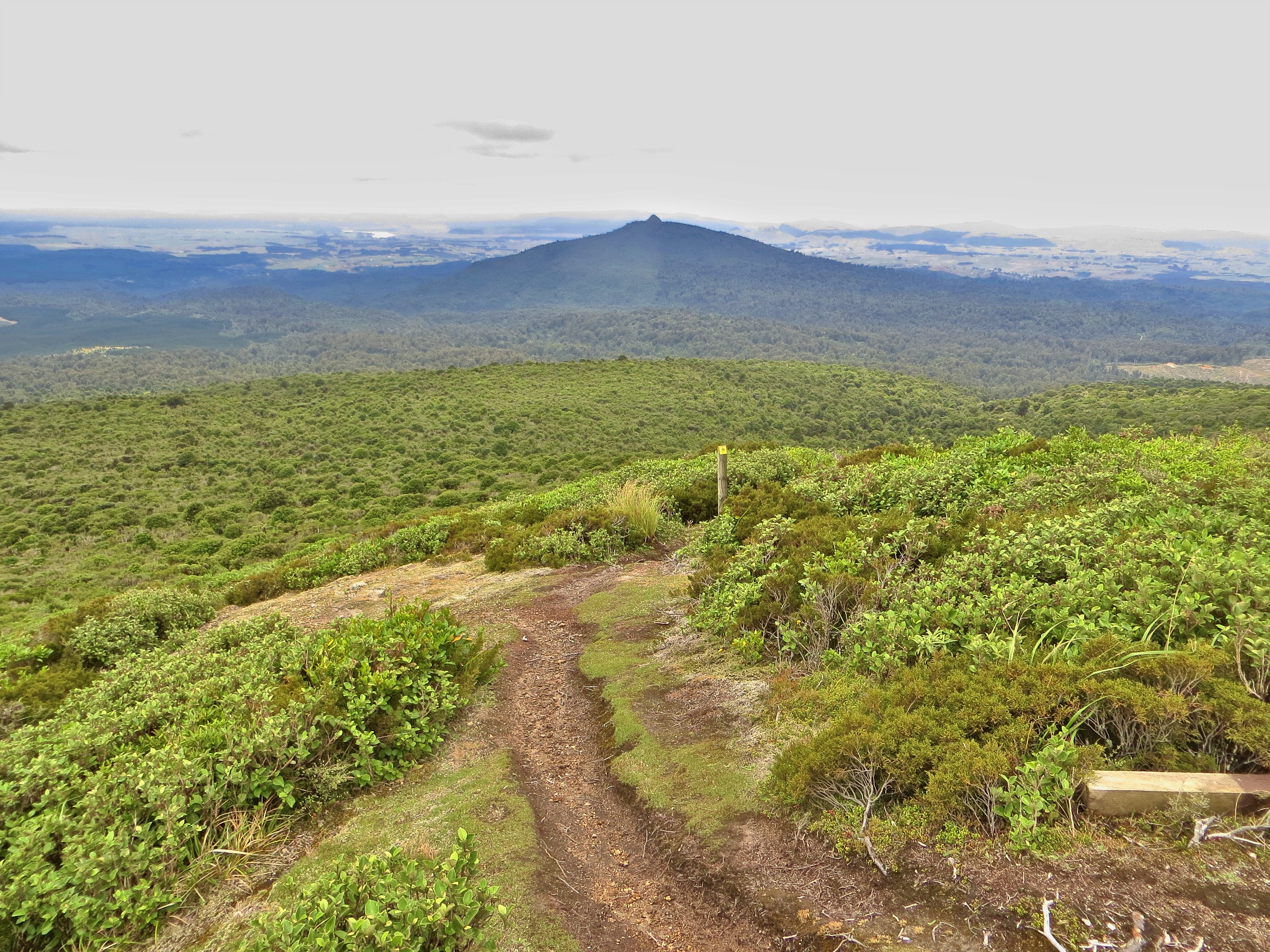
Mount Titiraupenga, where Tia settled and died.

Tia was born in Hawaiki to Tuamatua and Tauna. Together with his son, Tapuika, he travelled with Tama-te-kapua and Ngātoro-i-rangi on the Arawa canoe, which made landfall in New Zealand at Maketu in the Bay of Plenty. Te Hata says that when other members of crew started staking claims to land immediately after landing, Tia did not. D. M. Stafford says that he declared the area from Maketu west to Te Puke to be the belly of his son Tapuika. Later, Tapuika did settle in this area.

=== Exploration ===
From Maketu, Tia set out with his brother Oro, Oro's son Māka, his own son Tapuika, and Hatupatu to explore the interior of the North Island. They first headed inland to Kaharoa, then continued to Lake Rotorua. From there Tia continued to Horohoro, which received its name because he touched the dead body of an important chief there and had to be cleansed by a tohunga in a ceremony called Te Horohoroinga-nui-a-Tia (the great cleansing of Tia). Other accounts say that this happened to Kahumatamomoe, not Tia. Tia met the Waikato River at Whakamaru, climbed nearby Mount Titiraupenga, then headed upstream, giving Ātiamuri its name, which means 'Tia who follows behind', because the murkiness of the Waikato led him to believe someone was ahead of him. A set of rapids along the Waikato River, near present day Wairakei became known as Aratiatia (Tia's stairway). When he reached Lake Taupō, he travelled down the western coast.

Te Hata says that he found no inhabitants around Lake Taupō, but Grace claims that he saw houses of Ngāti Hotu. At any rate, he built a tūāhu altar at Pākā Bay on the east coast, ritually claiming ownership of the region. Tia named the altar Hikurangi and the place Taupō-nui-a-Tia ('the great cloak of Tia') because the cliffs or the waterfall there looked like his raincoat. This name was later extended to the lake itself and to the township at its northeastern corner. Tia settled at Titiraupenga. After Tia had been dwelling in the region for a while, Ngātoro-i-rangi arrived from the north, climbed up Mount Tauhara and threw a spear or a tree from the mountain into the lake, then built his own tūāhu at Taharepa, and began moving down the east coast of the lake building further tūāhu at regular intervals. When he reached Pākā Bay he found Tia's tūāhu, but nevertheless built his own, intentionally using rotten flax for the mat and decayed wood for the posts. When he encountered Tia, the two of them argued over who had arrived first, but Ngātoro-i-rangi pointed out that the materials of his tūāhu were already rotten and decaying, while Tia's were still new, so Tia was forced to concede that Ngātoro-i-rangi had arrived first.

Tia and Ngātoro-i-rangi travelled south along the coast of Taupō together, building a tūāhu called Mahuehue at Motutere and then continuing to Tokaanu, where they split up. Ngātoro-i-rangi headed south to climb Tongariro. Tia and Māka headed west to Mount Hauhungaroa, Mount Hurakia, and on to Titiraupeka (location unknown) or back to Titiraupenga, where they both died. Locke reports that in the mid-nineteenth century, their skulls were still being used by local Māori as mauri kumara (kumara talismans), which were taken out into the fields to encourage a good kumara harvest.

Through his sons, Tia is an ancestor of all Ngāti Tūwharetoa settled around Lake Taupō, just like Ngātoro-i-rangi. (Note: Locke 1882, p. 435 gives one line of descent: Tia – Apa – Tama-apa – Tama-aia – Tama-ariki – Tama-tatonga – Tatekura – Tuahatana – Takapumanuka – Kahu-paunamu – Taimeneharangi – Hiko, who married Tamamutu (the grandson of Ngātoro-i-rangi's descendant Tūwharetoa i te Aupouri) – Kapawa – Meremere (II) – Rangi-tua-mato-toru – Rangihirauea – Tumu – Maniapoto.; Te Hata & Fletcher 1916, p. 106 gives another line of descent which joins the lines of Tia and Ngātoro-i-rangi a few generations earlier: Tia – Tapuika – Maranga-paroa – Tu-whakamaru – Kauae – Rongomai-aia, who married Tane-turiwera (a great-grandson of Tūwharetoa i te Aupouri) – Hine-tuki, who married Taringa – Tū-te-tawhā, who married Hine-mihi – Te Rangi-ita – Tama-mutu, who married Hiko, etc. (Fletcher dates Tama-mutu around 1700).)

== Sources ==
Samuel Locke's 1882 publication of Māori traditions from Taupo and the East Coast, which he says he translated from written accounts produced by unnamed Māori tohunga, includes a very brief sketch of Tia's life. Hoeta Te Hata of Ngāti Tūwharetoa provided a much fuller account which was published in 1916. Further accounts appear in the John Te Herekiekie Grace's history of Ngāti Tūwharetoa and D. M. Stafford's history of Te Arawa.

== Bibliography ==
- Locke, Samuel (1882). "Historical Traditions of Taupo and East Coast Tribes". Transactions and Proceedings of the Royal Society of New Zealand. 15: 433–459.
- Te Hata, Hoeta; Fletcher, H. J. (1916). "The Ngati-Tuhare-toa occupation of Taupo-nui-a-tia". Journal of the Polynesian Society. 25 (99): 104–116.
- Grace, John Te Herekiekie (1959). Tuwharetoa: The history of the Maori people of the Taupo District. Auckland [N.Z.]: A.H. & A.W. Reed.
- Stafford, Don (1967). Te Arawa: A History of the Arawa People. Reed. ISBN 9780947506100.
