= Maketū Pies =

New Zealand pie company

Maketū Pies Ltd, doing business as Maketū Pies, is a New Zealand manufacturer of meat pies based in Maketu. It was founded in 1982.

In late 2019 Maketū Pies went into receivership, during which it had 40 staff members. During that time Maketū Pies said that all their pies were hand-made and that they were sold at Countdown (now Woolworths), Pak'nSave and New World supermarkets and Qantas flights. In October 2019 Maketū Pies was bought by Te Arawa Management, which in turn is owned by Te Arawa Lakes Trust Incorporated, for an undisclosed sum.

In 2024 the Maketū Pies was put into voluntary liquidation by its parent company, Te Arawa Management Ltd, due to Maketū Pies being unprofitable. The liquidators were tasked with running the company whilst looking for a buyer. Two weeks later the business was acquired by the Montana Group, a catering company.

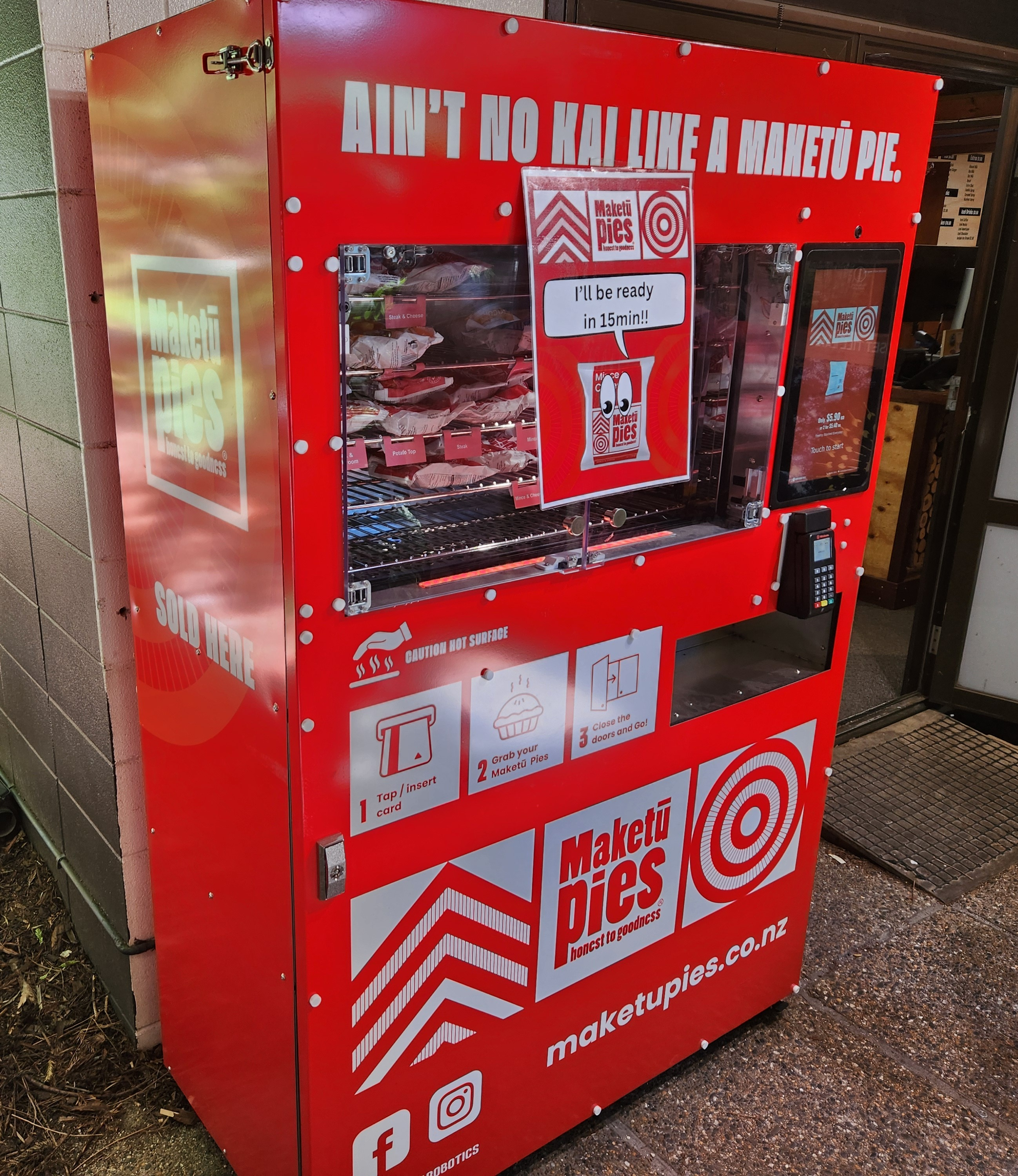
The Maketū Pies vending machine in Roturua, 2026

In December 2025 a hot pie vending machine manufactured by PieBot was placed at Redwoods Forest in Rotorua. It has 10 Maketū Pies flavours.
