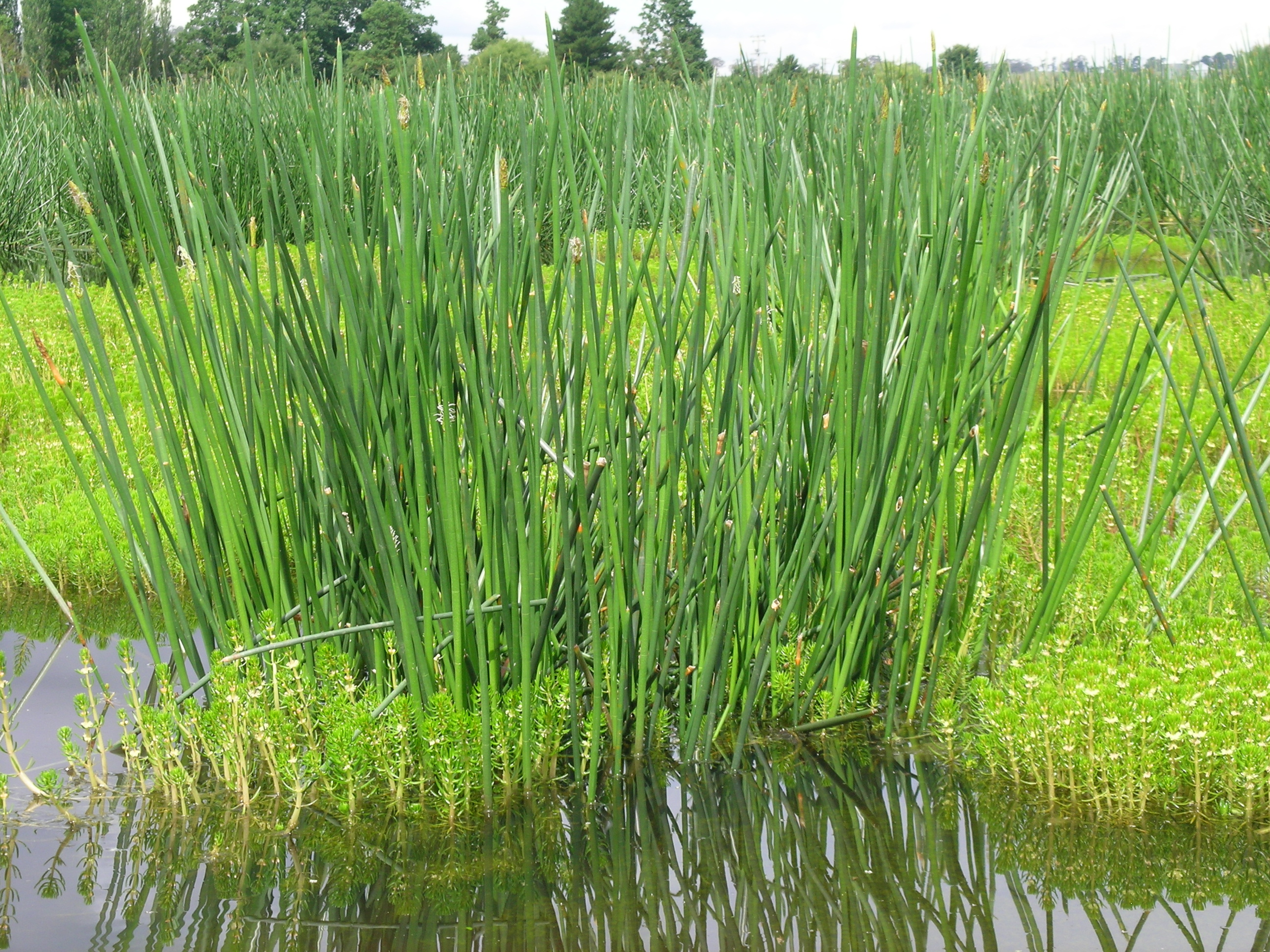

Scientific classification
- Kingdom: Plantae
- Clade: Tracheophytes
- Clade: Angiosperms
- Clade: Monocots
- Clade: Commelinids
- Order: Poales
- Family: Cyperaceae
- Genus: Eleocharis
- Species: E. sphacelata

Binomial name
- Eleocharis sphacelata R.Br.

= Eleocharis sphacelata =

Species of grass-like plant

Eleocharis sphacelata, commonly known as tall spikerush, is a sedge of the family Cyperaceae that is native to Australia and New Zealand.

The erect rhizomatous perennial herb to grass-like sedge typically grows to a height of 1 to 2 metres (3.3 to 6.6 ft). It blooms between February and October producing white flowers.

It is found in and around lagoons and in and around swampy areas in coastal parts of the Kimberley, South West, Great Southern and Goldfields-Esperance regions of Western Australia where it grows in black muddy soils.
