= Whakaotirangi =

Māori experimental gardener

Whakaotirangi was the daughter of Tainui and the wife of Hoturoa who was the Captain of the Tainui Canoe and a High Priest. Their son Hotuope is the ancestor of the main chief line of the Tainui Tribe in Aotearoa / New Zealand. Tainui was not the Tribe of Hoturoa as this is the name of Whakaoterangi's father - it is their son Hotuope who is the beginning of the Tainui bloodline in Aotearoa / New Zealand. Whakaotirangi was also a Māori experimental gardener. Her name has been translated as "completion from the sky" or "the heavens complete".

Early accounts describe her as a leader, who may even have contributed to the building of the canoe.

Whakaotirangi is described in both Tainui and Te Arawa traditions as the woman who carried seeds of important plants on the journey to New Zealand / Aotearoa including kūmara (sweet potato). According to Tainui tradition, Whakaotirangi landed at Kawhia in the Waikato, but moved around experimenting and testing plants for food and medicinal uses. In Te Arawa traditions, Whakaotirangi planted her kūmara garden of toroa-māhoe at both Whangaparaoa Bay (near Cape Runaway), and Maketu in the Bay of Plenty. The colder climate of New Zealand required new growing methods, particularly for kūmara, which develop a characteristic taste when exposed to frost. She may also have used hue (Lagenaria siceraria, calabash gourd), para (Marattia salicina, king fern), aute (paper mulberry, Broussonetia papyrifera) and karaka (New Zealand laurel). Moving to Aotea, she built a garden called Hawaiki Nui, where medicinal plants are still found.

== Recognition ==
Depictions of Whakaotirangi (for example, at the Ōtāwhao marae) show her with her basket of kūmara seed potatoes. She is embodied in both karakia and many whakataukī.

In 2017 Whakaotirangi was described by the Royal Society Te Apārangi as one of New Zealand's first scientists, selected for their "150 women in 150 words" celebrating the contribution of women to knowledge in New Zealand.
