= Maketu =

Town in the Bay of Plenty, New Zealand

- Town
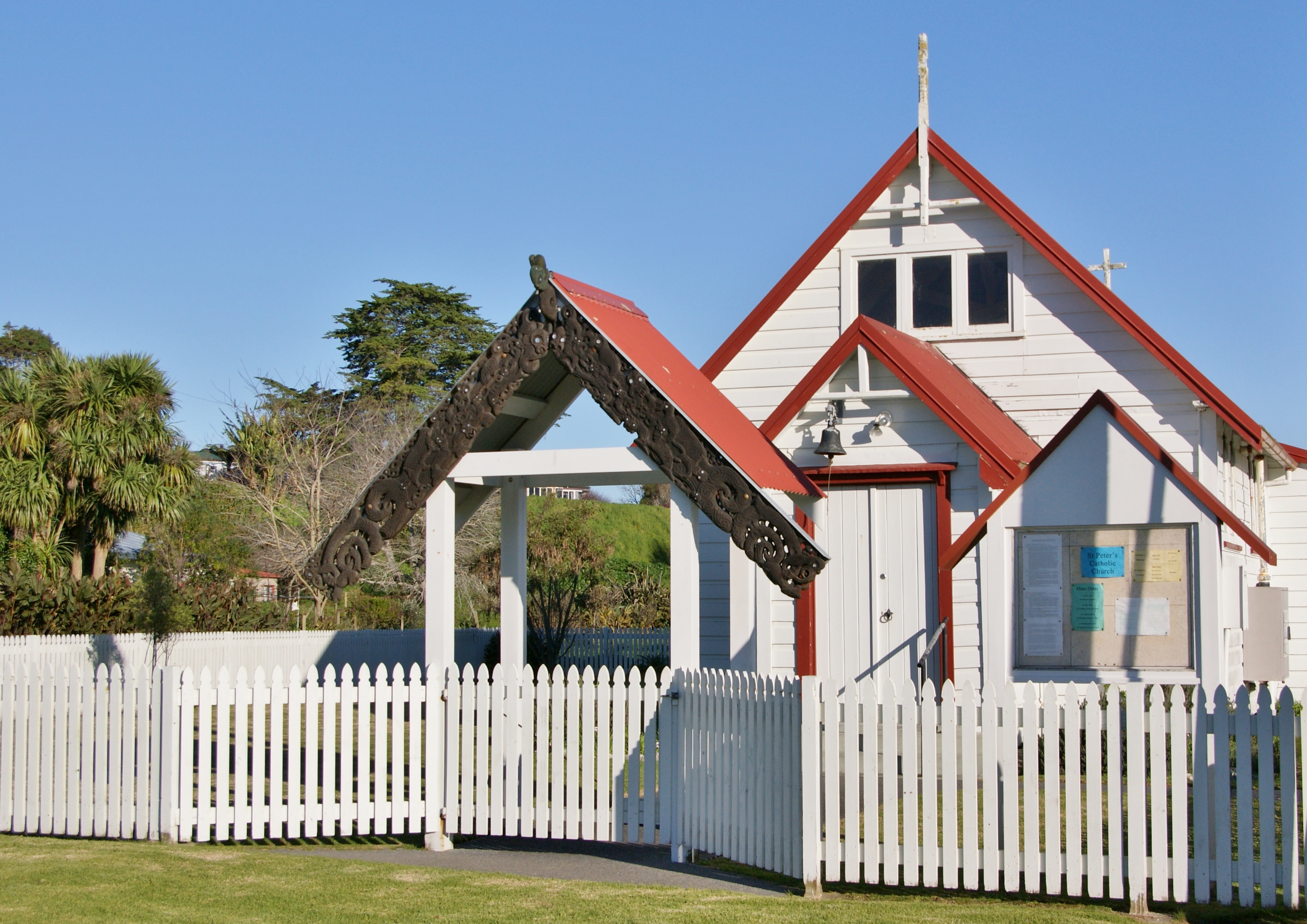
- St Peters Catholic Church, Maketu, 2011
- Interactive map of Maketu
- Coordinates: 37°45′34″S 176°27′6″E
- Country: New Zealand
- Region: Bay of Plenty
- Territorial authority: Western Bay of Plenty
- Ward: Maketu-Te Puke Ward
- Community: Maketu Community
- Electorates: East Cape; Waiariki (Māori)

Government
  - Territorial authority: Western Bay of Plenty District Council
  - Regional council: Bay of Plenty Regional Council
  - Mayor of Western Bay of Plenty: James Denyer
  - East Cape MP: Dana Kirkpatrick
  - Waiariki MP: Rawiri Waititi

Area
  - Total: 5.15 km^{2} (1.99 sq mi)

Population (June 2025)
  - Total: 1,410
  - Density: 274/km^{2} (709/sq mi)
- Postcode(s): 3189

Maketu is a small town on the Western Bay of Plenty coast in New Zealand. It is located roughly 9 km (5.6 mi) from Paengaroa, 14 km (8.7 mi) from Te Puke, 38 km (24 mi) from Tauranga, 56 km (35 mi) from Rotorua and 62 km (39 mi) from Whakatāne.

Maketu has an estuary from which the Kaituna River used to flow, until 1956, when it was diverted to the Bay of Plenty, about 4 km (2.5 mi) upstream. It is also adjacent to Newdicks Beach located on the south eastern side of Okurei Point. The Waihi Estuary Wildlife Management Reserve is near Maketu.

== History ==
Maketu is rich in ancestral Māori culture, particularly of the Te Arawa and Mātaatua tribal confederations. Maketu was the landing site of the Arawa canoe. The chief who led the voyage of the Arawa waka from Hawaiki to New Zealand/Aotearoa was Tama-te-kapua. When he caught sight of the Maketu peninsula, he staked a claim to it, declaring it to be "the bridge of my nose." Other members of the crew began claiming the land: Tia declared the area north of Maketu to be the belly of his son Tapuika and Hei called the next hill north of that the belly of his son Waitaha. They brought the Arawa up the Kaituna River at Maketu, tying the bow to a rock called Tokaparore and the stern with an anchor called Tuterangiharuru. Both rocks are features of the landscape today. This landfall took place in December. Many of the arrivals settled in Maketu, but some continued their journey inland, using the Kaituna River as far as Rotorua. Maketu is named after an ancient kūmara (sweet potato) pit in Hawaiki, the Māori ancestral homeland.

Shortly after they arrived, Ruaeo arrived in the Pukateawainui, seeking revenge on Tama-te-kapua for having kidnapped his wife. Ruaeo's men surrounded the crew of the Arawa in the night. Then Ruaeo whacked the canoe with his taiaha, waking everyone up, and challenged Tama-te-kapua to fight. In the end Ruaeo was victorious and demonstrated his victory by rubbing "vermin" over Tama-te-kapua's face. Then he departed, taking a group of men off towards Lake Rotorua along the Te Kaharoa-a-Taunga trail (roughly equivalent to modern State Highway 33). Tama-te-kapua's son Kahumatamomoe disputed the ownership of a kūmara patch with his father, claiming that since he had cultivated the land it should be his. The people mostly agreed with Kahumatamomoe, so Tama-te-kapua decided to leave with his other son Tuhoromatakakā and settle at Moehau.

After generations of wandering, Ngāi Te Rangi, part of the Mataatua confederation, conquered Maketu from Te Arawa under the leadership of Rangihouhiri, in revenge for stealing the remains of a murdered member of the tribe. The local leaders, Tatahau and his sons Manu and Tiritiri of Tapuika called on allies from Waitaha and Waikato, while Ngāi Te Rangi were assisted by Ngāti Pukenga. In the climactic Battle of Poporohumea, Ngai te Rangi were victorious, but Rangihouhiri himself was killed.

In 2011, Maketu was one of many areas along the Bay of Plenty coast affected by the grounding of the MV Rena and the subsequent oil spill.

== Demographics ==
Maketū is described by Statistics New Zealand as a small urban area. It covers 5.15 km^{2} (1.99 sq mi) and had an estimated population of 1,410 as of June 2025, with a population density of 274 people per km^{2}.

Historical population
Year	Pop.	±% p.a.
2006	1,176	—
2013	1,047	−1.65%
2018	1,197	+2.71%
2023	1,311	+1.84%

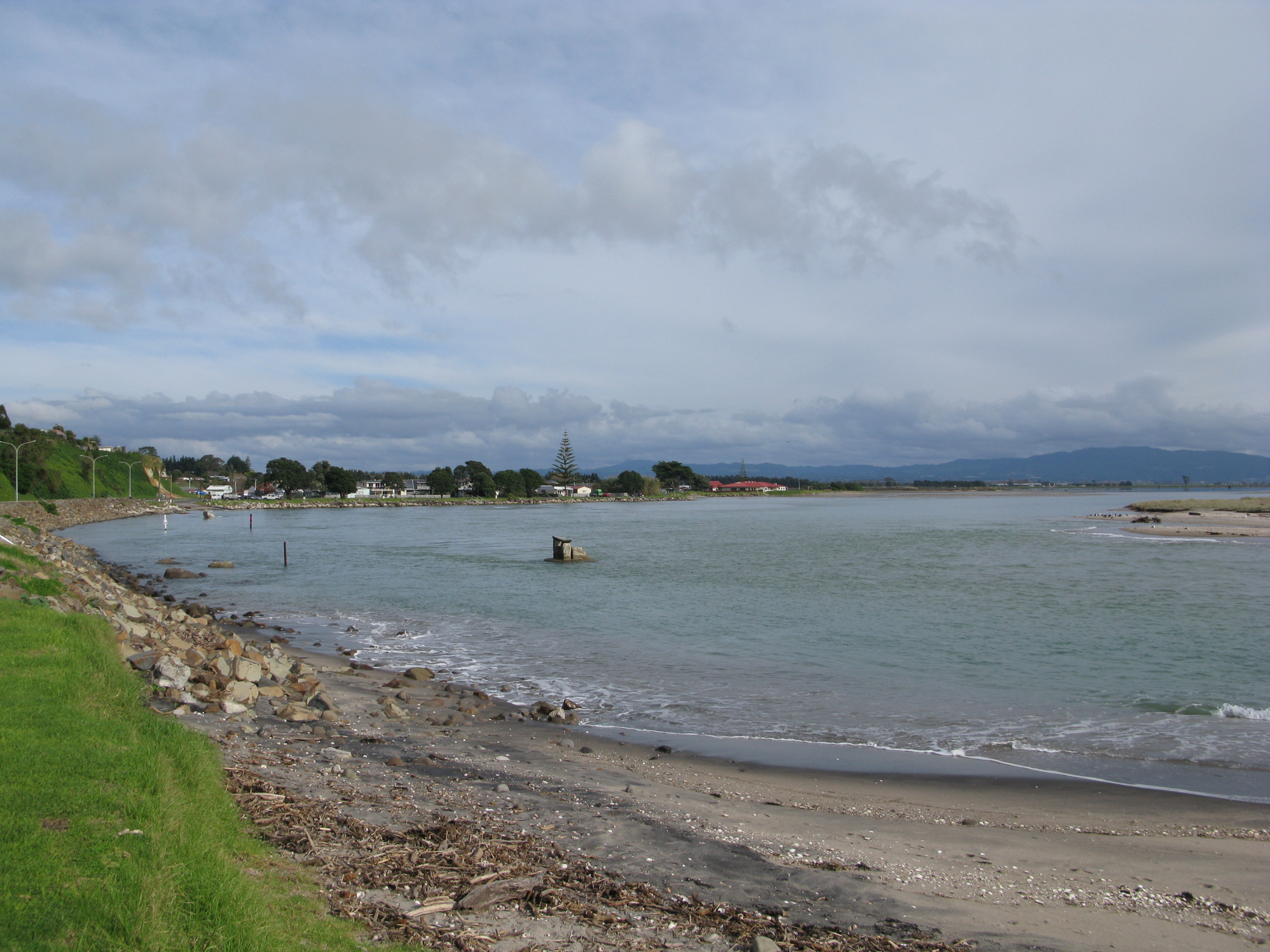
The bay of Maketu

Maketū had a population of 1,311 in the 2023 New Zealand census, an increase of 114 people (9.5%) since the 2018 census, and an increase of 264 people (25.2%) since the 2013 census. There were 630 males and 681 females in 441 dwellings. 1.4% of people identified as LGBTIQ+. The median age was 42.9 years (compared with 38.1 years nationally). There were 228 people (17.4%) aged under 15 years, 222 (16.9%) aged 15 to 29, 600 (45.8%) aged 30 to 64, and 258 (19.7%) aged 65 or older.

People could identify as more than one ethnicity. The results were 50.3% European (Pākehā); 68.2% Māori; 6.2% Pasifika; 1.8% Asian; 0.2% Middle Eastern, Latin American and African New Zealanders (MELAA); and 1.1% other, which includes people giving their ethnicity as "New Zealander". English was spoken by 97.5%, Māori by 19.0%, Samoan by 0.2%, and other languages by 3.9%. No language could be spoken by 1.6% (e.g. too young to talk). New Zealand Sign Language was known by 0.7%. The percentage of people born overseas was 9.6, compared with 28.8% nationally.

Religious affiliations were 32.5% Christian, 0.5% Hindu, 0.2% Islam, 5.3% Māori religious beliefs, 0.2% Buddhist, 0.5% New Age, 0.2% Jewish, and 0.9% other religions. People who answered that they had no religion were 51.9%, and 8.2% of people did not answer the census question.

Of those at least 15 years old, 168 (15.5%) people had a bachelor's or higher degree, 570 (52.6%) had a post-high school certificate or diploma, and 345 (31.9%) people exclusively held high school qualifications. The median income was $36,700, compared with $41,500 nationally. 60 people (5.5%) earned over $100,000 compared to 12.1% nationally. The employment status of those at least 15 was 519 (47.9%) full-time, 132 (12.2%) part-time, and 60 (5.5%) unemployed.

== Marae ==
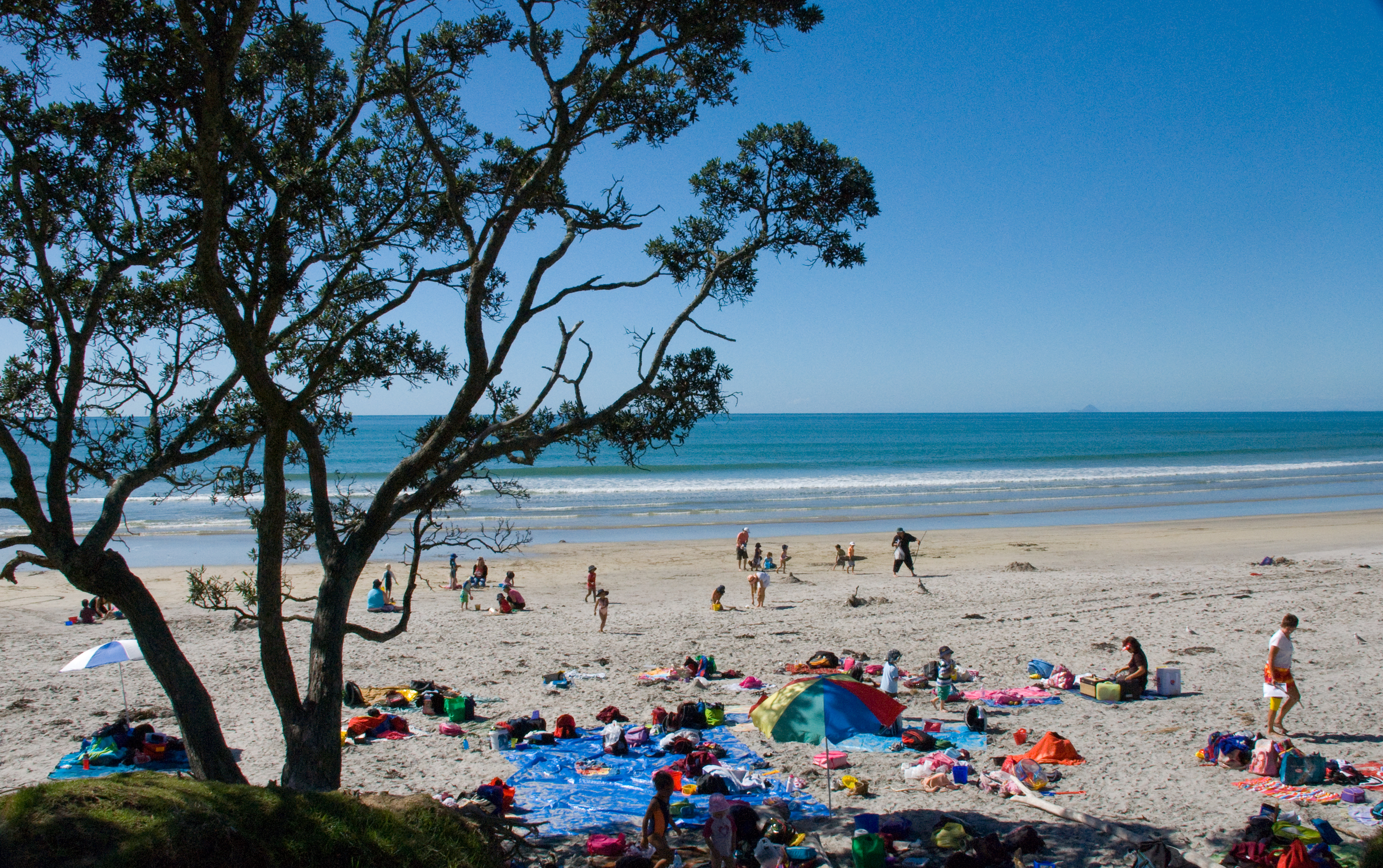
Kindergarten beach picnic in Maketu

Maketu has two marae:

- Whakaue or Tapiti Marae and its Whakaue Kaipapa meeting house are affiliated with the Ngāti Whakaue hapū of Ngāti Whakaue ki Maketū. In October 2020, the Government committed $4,525,104 from the Provincial Growth Fund to upgrade the marae and nine others, creating an estimated 34 jobs.
- Te Awhe o te Rangi Marae and meeting house are a meeting place for the Ngāti Mākino hapū of Ngāti Mākino and Ngāti Te Awhe, and the Ngāti Pikiao hapū of Ngāti Pikiao. In October 2020, the Government committed $2,984,246 to upgrade the marae and 5 others, creating 20 jobs.

== Education ==
Maketu School (also called Te Kura o Maketu) is a co-educational state primary school for Year 1 to 6 students, with a roll of 44 as of July 2026. It opened in 1866 as Maketū Native School.

== See also ==
- Maketū Pies

== Sources ==
- Stafford, D.M. (1967). Te Arawa: A History of the Arawa People. Rotorua, New Zealand: A.H. & A.W. Reed..
