= Kahakaha =

Kahakaha can refer to various plants in the genus Astelia:

- Astelia fragrans
- Astelia hastata
