= Donald Stafford =

New Zealand historian (1927–2010)

Donald Stafford CBE
- Born: 12 September 1927
- Died: 6 April 2010 (aged 82)
- Known for: History of Rotorua; History of the Te Arawa people

Donald Stafford, CBE (12 September 1927 – 6 April 2010) was a New Zealand historian who published several works of history. His interest was primarily the Te Arawa confederation of the local Māori people of Rotorua, and Rotorua itself.

== Biography ==
Donald Murray Stafford was born in Auckland, New Zealand, on 12 September 1927. His father worked in the clothing industry and moved the family to Rotorua, where he operated a menswear shop. He studied anthropology at the University of Auckland. As a young man, Stafford worked in his father's shop where he came into contact with elders of the Te Arawa confederation of iwi (tribes). From them, he became familiar with the history and traditions of the people of Te Arawa, as well as gaining competency in Te Reo, the Māori language.

In 1967, his book Te Arawa: A History of the Arawa People was published by Reed Publishing. Some years previously, he had been contacted by Ray Richards, a representative of the publisher, with an expression of interest for a work based on the anecdotes and stories that Stafford had collected from the Te Arawa people he had spoken to. He had also travelled widely in he region, meeting with and gaining the confidence of elders of the Arawa iwi. The book proved to be successful and sales of all editions have exceeded 40,000. The following year Stafford was appointed the curator of the Rotorua City Museum and instigated its photographic collection. In the 1980 Queen's Birthday Honours, he was appointed a Member of the Order of the British Empire for "services to the preservation of Maori traditions and history."

In the 1980s, and writing as the city's official historian, Stafford published The Founding Years in Rotorua and the subsequent The New Century in Rotorua. For the former book, he received the J. M. Sherrard award for regional history. He would eventually author over 20 books and monographs on the city and its environs. In 1993, he was awarded an honorary doctorate by the University of Waikato. In the 1994 New Year Honours, he was appointed a Commander of the Order of the British Empire for "services to Māori and local history."

Stafford continued to write and publish his books in his later years. A follow-up history of the Awara people was published in the late 1990s and his last book, printed in 2007, was 'Wild Wind From the North', a biography of the Māori warrior and chief, Hongi Hika. He died in Rotorua on 6 April 2010. He was predeceased by his wife, who had died in 1997. At the time of his death, leaders of Rotorua were advocating for him to receive a knighthood.

Stafford is the namesake for the room housing the Rotorua library's heritage collection.

== Selected works ==
- Te Arawa: A History of the Arawa People. Rotorua: A.H. & A.W. Reed. 1967.
- The founding years in Rotorua: a history of events to 1900. Auckland & Rotorua: R. Richards Publisher & Rotorua District Council. 1986. ISBN 978-0-908596-25-6.
- The new century in Rotorua: a history of events from 1900. Auckland & Rotorua: Ray Richards Publisher & Rotorua District Council. 1988. ISBN 978-0-908596-27-0.
- Pakiwaitara: Te Arawa Stories of Rotorua. Auckland: Penguin Group New Zealand. 1999. ISBN 978-0-7900-0714-4.
