= Te Roro-o-te-rangi =

Te Roro-o-te-rangi was a 17th-century Māori rangatira (chief) of the Ngāti Whakaue iwi within the Te Arawa confederation of tribes, in the Bay of Plenty region of New Zealand. He forged a peace between Arawa and Ngāi Te Rangi after a generation of warfare. Later, he became enmeshed in a conflict with Tamamutu of Ngāti Tūwharetoa, which ultimately led to his death. He is the ancestor of the Ngāti te Roro o te Rangi hapū of Ngāti Whakaue.

== Life ==
Te Roro-o-te-rangi was the eldest son of Ariariterangi, through whom he was a descendant of Hinemoa and Tūtānekai, and ultimately of Tama-te-kapua and Ngātoro-i-rangi, the captain and tohunga of the Arawa. He had two younger siblings: Te Kata and Tūnohopū. When he was grown up, he made his base on Mokoia island on Lake Rotorua.

=== Peace with Ngāi Te Rangi ===
Before Te Roro-o-te-rangi was born, Ngāi Te Rangi had driven Te Arawa out of Maketu and began launching raids on other settlements of Te Arawa. Te Roro-o-te-rangi's uncles, Taiwere and Moekaha each separately led war parties to attack Ngāi Te Rangi at Maketu, but both were defeated and killed. Te Roro-o-te-rangi's father, Te Ariarirangi, decided to lead a third war party against Maketu and therefore began building up a coalition. In order to seal an alliance with Ngāti Hauā, he married Te Roro-o-te-rangi to Hauā's daughter Kaimatai. Te Ariarirangi then led his forces against Maketu, but his arrogance led them to desert him and he was defeated at the Battle of Kakaho.

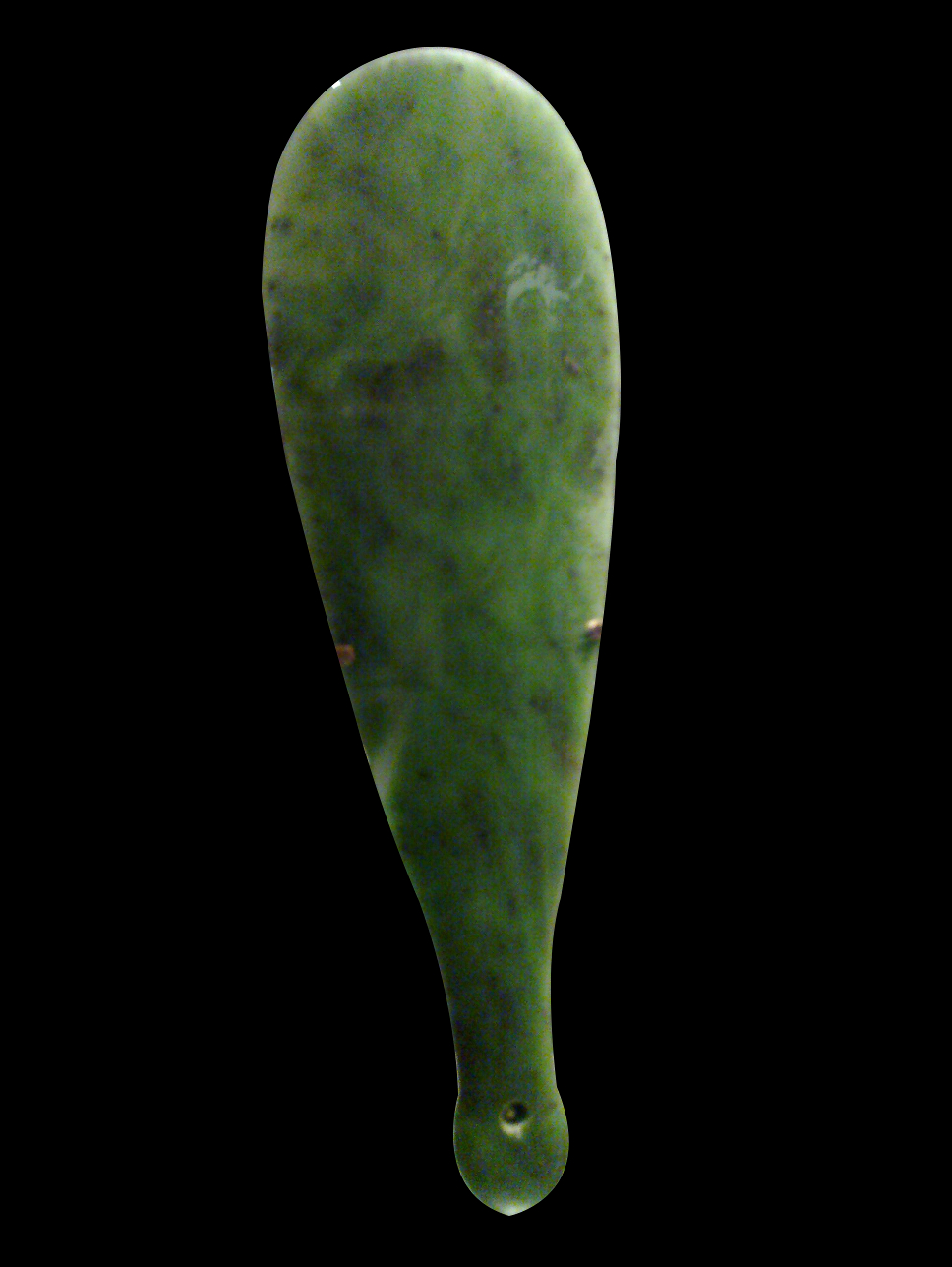
'Kataore', a mere pounamu.

Te Roro-o-te-rangi decided to avenge his father's death and gathered together yet another war party, containing a thousand men, and besieged Maketu. As victory was nigh, he heard one of the women of Ngāi Te Rangi, called Te Kurauuhirangi, singing a poroporoaki (a funerary eulogy). She called out to Te Roro-o-te-rangi, asking him to spare Maketu and he agreed to do so. As peace offerings, the women of Maketu gifted him a pounamu mere called Kaitangata, a gourd covered in feathers of the toroa (albatross), and a mat made of kahakaha. Finally, several marriages were contracted between Te Arawa and Ngāi Te Rangi.

=== War with Ngāti Tūwharetoa ===
==== Tamamutu's first expedition ====
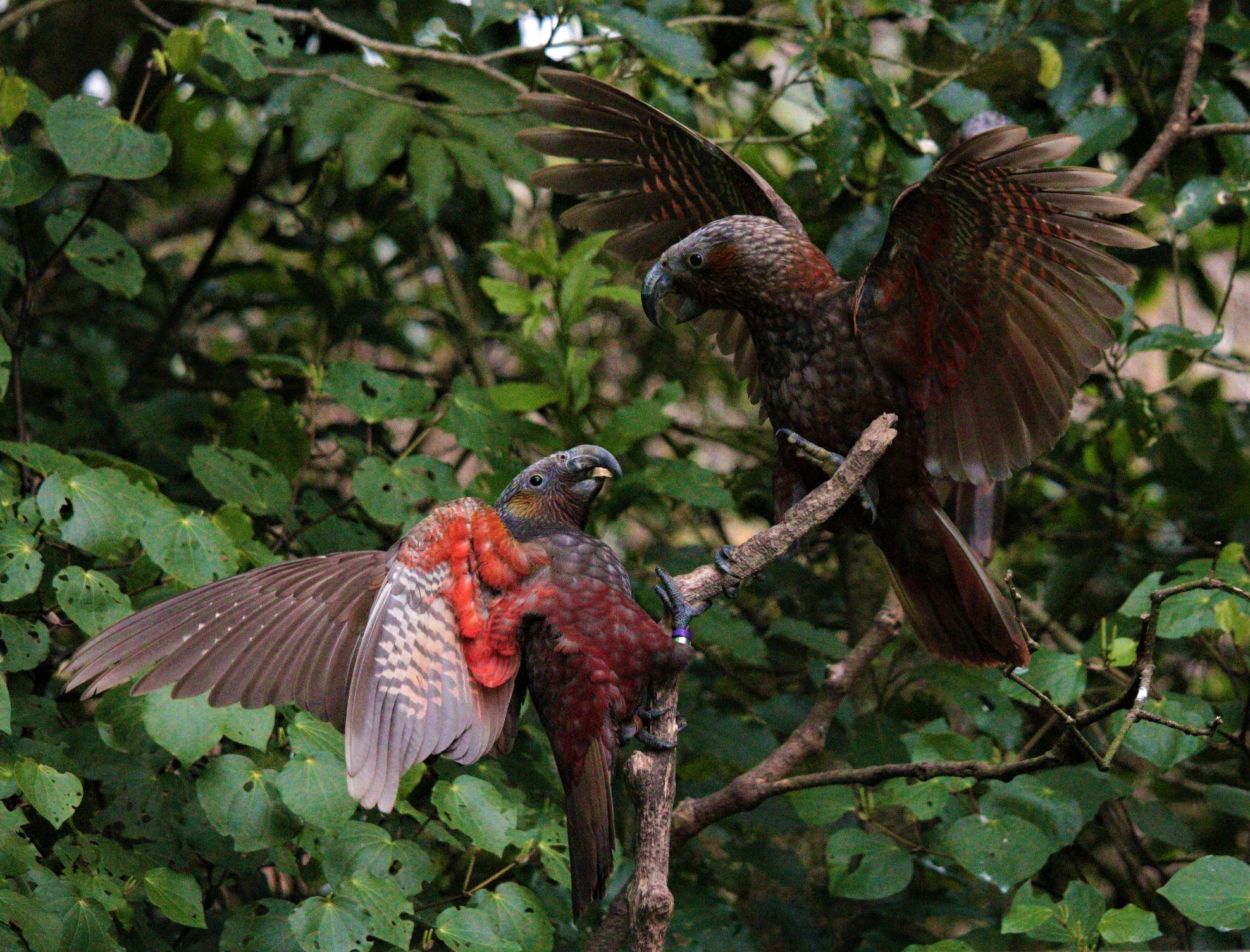
Two Kākā birds.

Tamamutu of Ngāti Tūwharetoa gave a kākahu kura (a cloak made of the red feathers of the kākā) to Te Roro-o-te-rangi, but he gave them nothing in return. According to D. M. Stafford, Te Roro-o-te-rangi had planned to make a gift eventually, but was offended when Tamamutu showed up in person to demand the gift, so he cursed Tamamutu. As a result of the curse, Tamamutu and his takahoa (personal intimate), Te Rangi-pātōtō, gathered a war party of Ngāti Tūwharetoa and set out to get vengeance.

The party travelled down the Waikato River to Hipa-pātua (near Tapapakuao) where they got out of their canoes and advanced overland. They forged an alliance with Ngāti Kea Ngāti Tuarā, who had been marginalised by Te Arawa, and met to plan at their pā (fortress), Opukaka, near Patere. The party encountered Te Roro-o-te-rangi's nephews, Tiki and Kaui, and killed them. Tūwharetoa sources say that Tamamutu was absent when this occurred. Arawa sources say that Tamamutu ambushed the pair as they came to lay fishing nets at the mouth of the Waikuta Stream near Kawaha Point. The site of the attack was renamed Te Karamuramu a Tikitika.

==== Tamamutu's second expedition ====
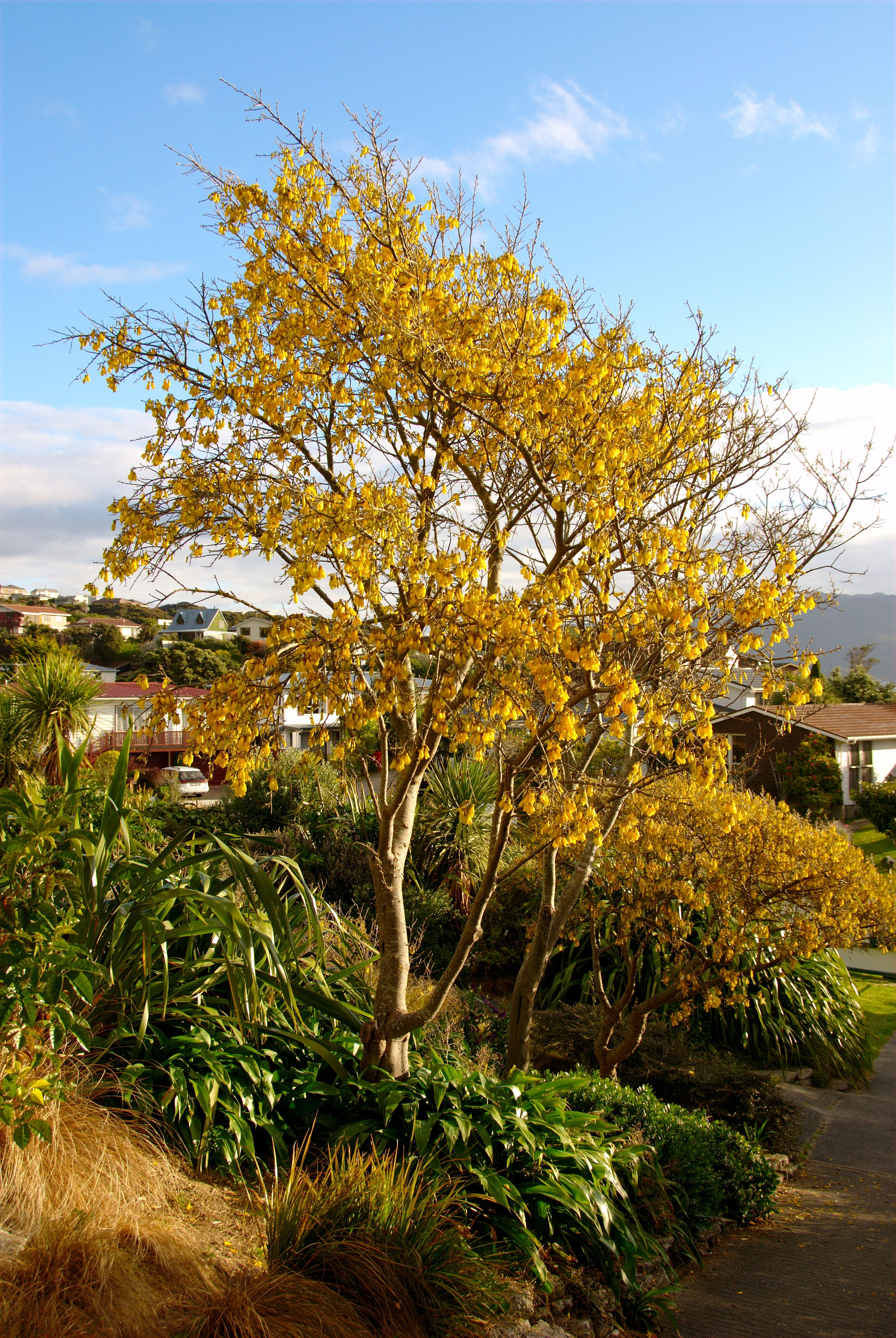
Kōwhai tree in full bloom, before foliage has emerged

After this, Tamamutu went home, but Te Roro-o-te-rangi's brother Tunohopu allied with Ngāti Rangiwewehi and attacked Ngāti Kea Ngāti Tuarā, so Tamamutu returned with another war party. Tamamutu's second-in-command, Te Rangi-pātōtō or Tahora, headed off to the northwest coast of Lake Rotorua and attacked the villages of Te Awahou, Weriweri, and Puhirua, quickly seizing them. According to Arawa sources, Te Roro-o-te-rangi gathered his forces on Mokoia and landed at Motutara, but the tohunga with the war party had premonitions of defeat and Te Roro-o-te-rangi's troops began to desert. When Tamamutu attacked, the entire army fled, leaving Te Roro-o-te-rangi and his brother Te Kata alone, to be captured by Tamamutu. Before the battle, Te Roro-o-te-rangi said Ruia taitea, ruia taitea, kia tū ko taikākā, ko ahau anake. ("Shake off the sapwood – retain the strong heartwood. Let those who are afraid leave now. Though alone, I will stay and face the enemy."), which became a whakatauki (proverb). The defeat was called the Battle of Tāwharakurupeti.

According to Tūwharetoa sources, the proverb was said by Tamamutu, who attacked Pukeroa (modern Rotorua city), but was unable to take it until Te Rangi-pātōtō returned to help him. When they captured Pukeroa, Tamamutu captured Te Roro-o-te-rangi and seized the pounamu tiki called Te Ngako, as compensation for the cloak. As of 1959, this tiki was still in the possession of Tamamutu’s descendant, Ngarimu Haare.

==== Death ====
Tūwharetoa took Te Roro-o-te-rangi to Rotongaio, northeast of Lake Taupō, where they cooked him alive in the oven, Umukuri, ate him, and buried him on the western shore of Rotongaio, at Motu-hinahina, except for his head, which was preserved and hung from a kōwhai tree. It was left to Te Roro-o-te-rangi's younger brother, Tunuhopu to forge a lasting peace with Tamamutu and Ngāti Tūwharetoa.

== Family ==
Te Roro-o-te-rangi and Kaimatai had children:

- Wahaporoaki, who married Hinehou

- Korowhakaruru who married Rauika:

- Matahi, who married Paratai

- Hinehoki, who married Tumahau

- Manawapohatu, who married Urutamoua

- Tirakaramoa, who married Iwikatea

- Whatarangi who married Hinehaka

- Hinemarama

- Te Pora, who married Putoko

The Ngāti te Roro o te Rangi hapū of Ngāti Whakaue at Ōhinemutu is named after him. The meeting house at the Te Kuirau or Utuhina Marae is named Te Roro o Te Rangi in his honour.

== Bibliography ==
- Te Hata, Hoeta; Fletcher, H. J. (1917). "Ngati-Tuhare-toa occupation of Taupo-nui-a-tia". Journal of the Polynesian Society. 26: 19–30, 66–69, 91–99, 180–187.
- Grace, John Te Herekiekie (1959). Tuwharetoa: The history of the Maori people of the Taupo District. Auckland [N.Z.]: A.H. & A.W. Reed.
- Stafford, D.M. (1967). Te Arawa: A History of the Arawa People. Rotorua, New Zealand: A.H. & A.W. Reed.
- Steedman, J.A.W. (1984). Ngā Ohaaki o ngā Whānau o Tauranga Moana: Māori History and Genealogy of the Bay of Plenty.
- Stokes, Evelyn Mary (1992). Te Raupatu o Tauranga Moana: Vol 2 Documents relating to tribal history, confiscation and reallocation of Tauranga lands. Waitangi Tribunal.
