= Tūnohopū =

Tūnohopū was a 17th-century Māori rangatira (chief) of the Ngāti Whakaue iwi (tribe) within the Te Arawa confederation of tribes, in the Bay of Plenty region of New Zealand and is the ancestor of the Ngāti Tūnohopū hapū within that iwi. Under the command of his brother Te Roro-o-te-rangi, he fought a series of wars with Tamamutu of Ngāti Tūwharetoa, but eventually he travelled to Tamamutu's home at Motutere and forged a peace which endures to the present day.

== Life ==
Tūnohopū was a younger son of Ariariterangi, through whom he was a descendant of Hinemoa and Tūtānekai, and ultimately of Tama-te-kapua and Ngātoro-i-rangi, the captain and tohunga of the Arawa. He had two siblings: Te Roro-o-te-rangi and Te Kata. When he grew up, Tūnohopū made his base at Ohinemutu on Kawaha Point on the shore of the Lake Rotorua.

=== War with Ngāti Tūwharetoa ===
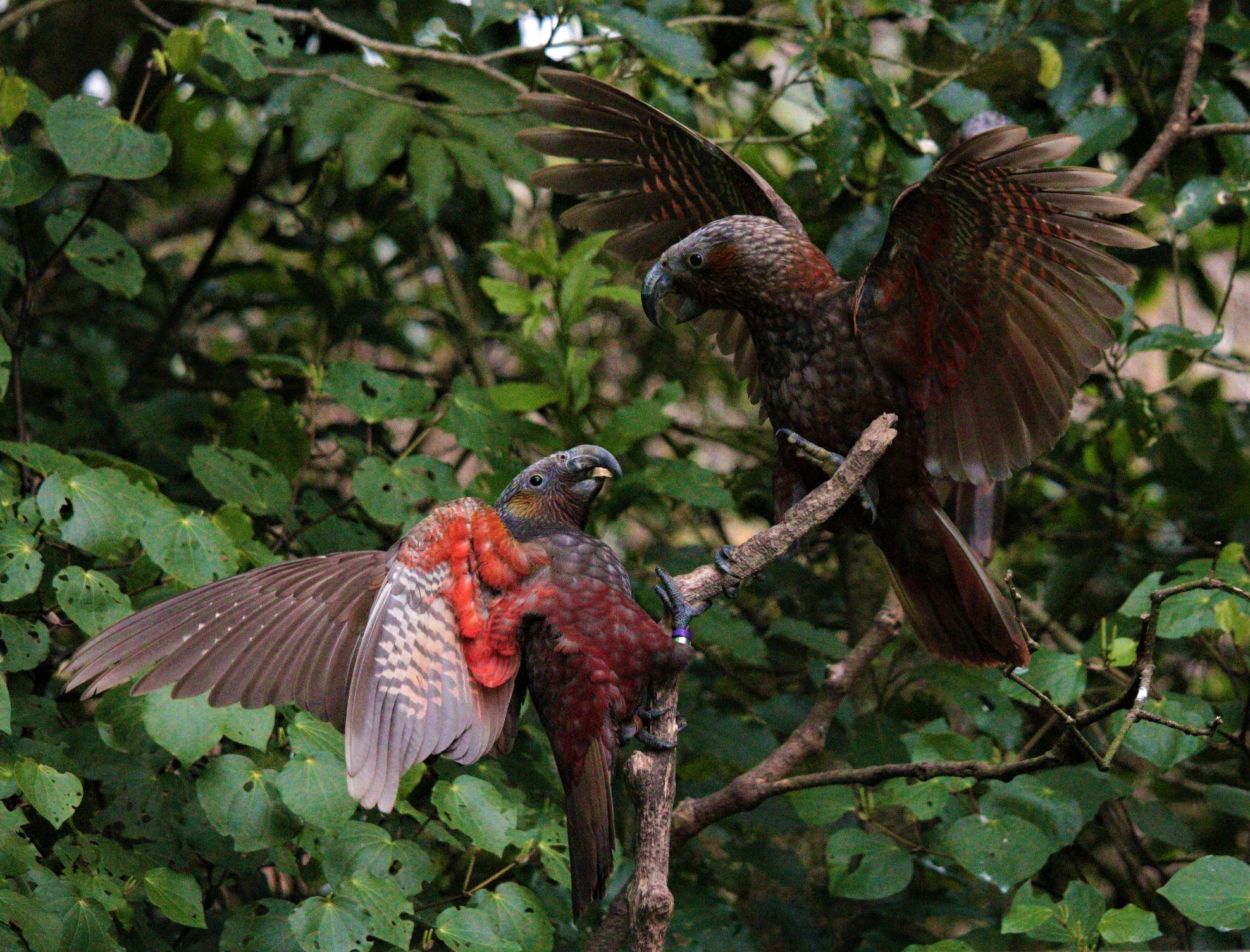
Two kākā birds

Tamamutu of Ngāti Tūwharetoa gave a kākahu kura (a cloak made of the red feathers of the kākā) to Tūnohopū's elder brother Te Roro-o-te-rangi, but he gave them nothing in return. According to D. M. Stafford, Te Roro-o-te-rangi had planned to make a gift eventually, but was offended when Tamamutu showed up in person to demand the gift, so he cursed Tamamutu. As a result of the curse, Tamamutu and his takahoa (personal intimate), Te Rangi-pātōtō, gathered a war party of Ngāti Tūwharetoa and set out to get vengeance.

The party travelled down the Waikato River to Hipa-pātua (near Tapapakuao) where they got out of their canoes and advanced overland. They forged an alliance with Ngāti Kea Ngāti Tuarā, who had been marginalised by Te Arawa, and met to plan at their pā (fortress), Opukaka, near Patere. The party encountered Te Roro-o-te-rangi's nephews, Tiki and Kaui, and killed them.

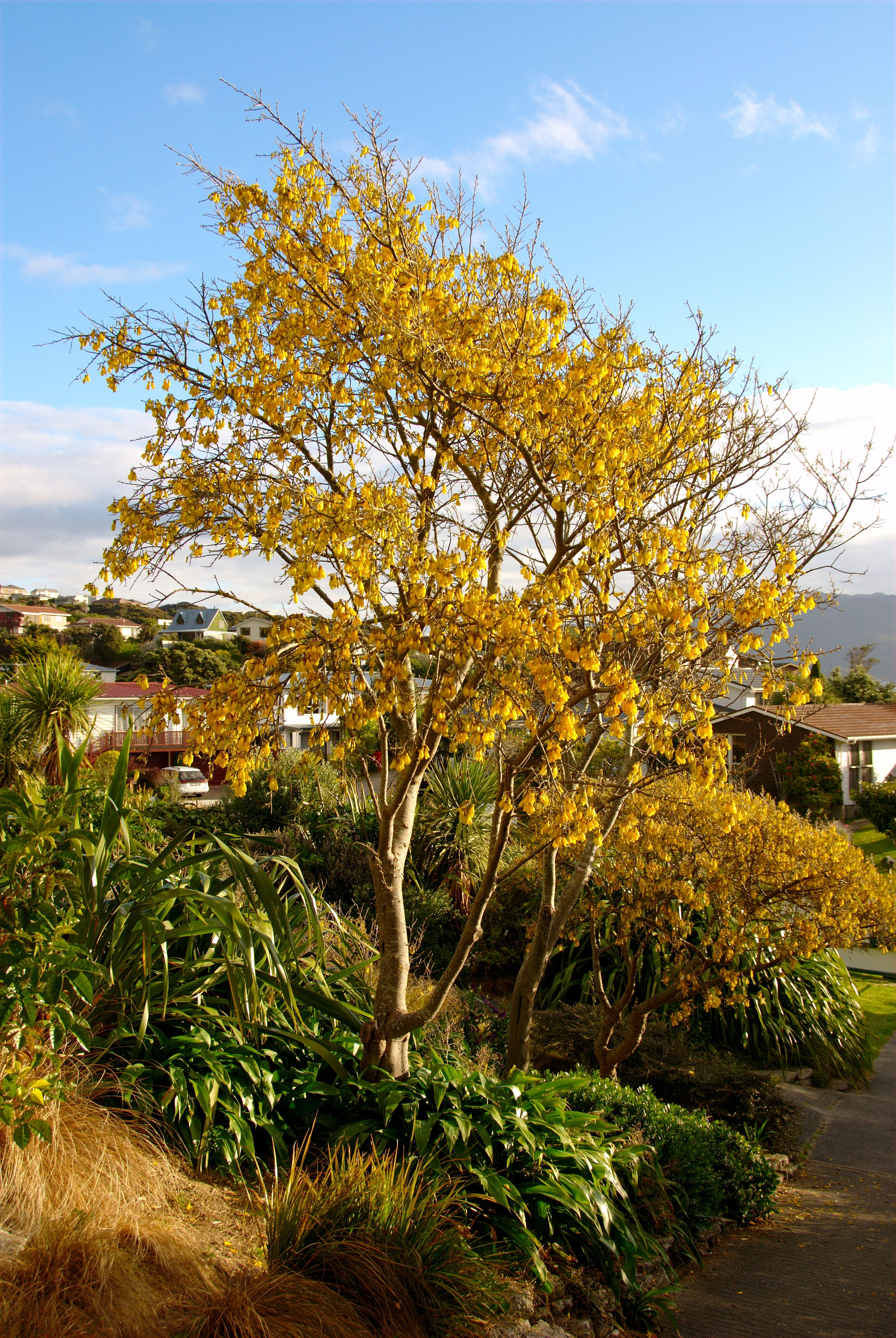
Kōwhai tree in full bloom, before foliage has emerged

After this, Tamamutu went home, but Tūnohopū allied with Ngāti Rangiwewehi and attacked Ngāti Kea Ngāti Tuarā, so Tamamutu returned with another war party. Te Roro-o-te-rangi and his brother Te Kata were defeated and captured by Tamamutu at the Battle of Tāwharakurupeti.

Meanwhile, Tūwharetoa forces advanced on Ohinemutu village on Tunohopu's base at Kawaha Point, which was left practically undefended. Tūnohopū was sleeping when the attack began but managed to escape to a nearby cave, Te Ana o Tunohopu. In the rush his youngest son, Taioperua, was left behind and captured by Te Rangi-pātōtō. This defeat was called the Battle of Tahorakurupeti.

Tūnohopū gathered a new war party, together with the Tapuika people. Tamamutu returned to Rotorua to crush this new threat, but he was defeated at the Battle of Te Awaawaroa. As a reward for their assistance, Tūnohopū gave a number of the women of his tribe to them in marriage: Rangiuru, daughter of Huratai; Purangi and Hinetai, daughters of Kaitoa; Pareherehere and Apukai, daughters of Kereru.

==== Visit to Motutere and peace with Arawa ====
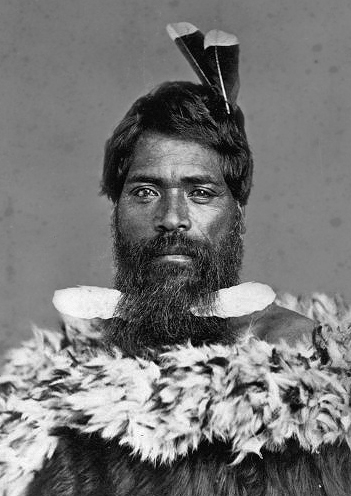
A Māori man from the Hauraki district wearing huia tail feathers in his hair (photo before 1886)

After the Battle of Te Awaawaroa, Tūnohopū learnt that his son Taioperua had not been killed by Tūwharetoa at the Battle of Tahorakurupeti, as he had thought, but had been taken prisoner and was still alive. Instead of trying to lead a war party to try to reclaim him, Tūnohopū dressed in shabby clothes and went to Tamamutu’s village at Motutere all on his own. When he arrived, Tūnohopū made it all the way into Tamamutu’s house without being recognised. There he announced why he had come, to Tamamutu’s great surprise.

Tamamutu agreed to return Taioperua, but needed the assent of the village to do this. He gifted Tūnohopū the clothing of a chief and gave him a huia feather to put in his hair – the traditional symbol of chieftainship. Then Tamamutu went out into the village and shouted that a war party had snuck into the village. The people gathered in alarm, but then they realised that Tūnohopū was within Tamamutu’s house and therefore under his protection. They agreed to return his son, showered him with presents, and made a peace with Ngāti Tūwharetoa, which proved permanent.

== Bibliography ==
- Te Hata, Hoeta; Fletcher, H. J. (1917). "Ngati-Tuhare-toa occupation of Taupo-nui-a-tia". Journal of the Polynesian Society. 26: 19–30, 66–69, 91–99, 180–187.
- Grace, John Te Herekiekie (1959). Tuwharetoa: The history of the Maori people of the Taupo District. Auckland [N.Z.]: A.H. & A.W. Reed.
- Stafford, D.M. (1967). Te Arawa: A History of the Arawa People. Rotorua, New Zealand: A.H. & A.W. Reed.
- Steedman, J.A.W. (1984). Ngā Ohaaki o ngā Whānau o Tauranga Moana: Māori History and Genealogy of the Bay of Plenty.
