= Ariariterangi =

Māori rangatira (chief) of the Ngāti Whakaue iwi

Ariariterangi was a Māori rangatira (chief) of the Ngāti Whakaue iwi within the Te Arawa confederation of tribes. He built a major coalition of tribes in an effort to drive Ngāi Te Rangi out of Maketu, but was defeated and killed.

== Life ==
Ariariterangi was the son of Whatumairangi of Ngāti Whakaue and the grandson of Hinemoa and Tūtānekai, through whom he was descended from Tama-te-kapua and Ngātoro-i-rangi, the captain and tohunga of the Arawa. His mother was Parehina. He had six brothers: Huingarangi, Taiwere, Moekaha, Hape-te-rarau, Hurunga, and Hikarua.

=== Conflict with Ngāi Te Rangi and Ngāti Whakahinga ===
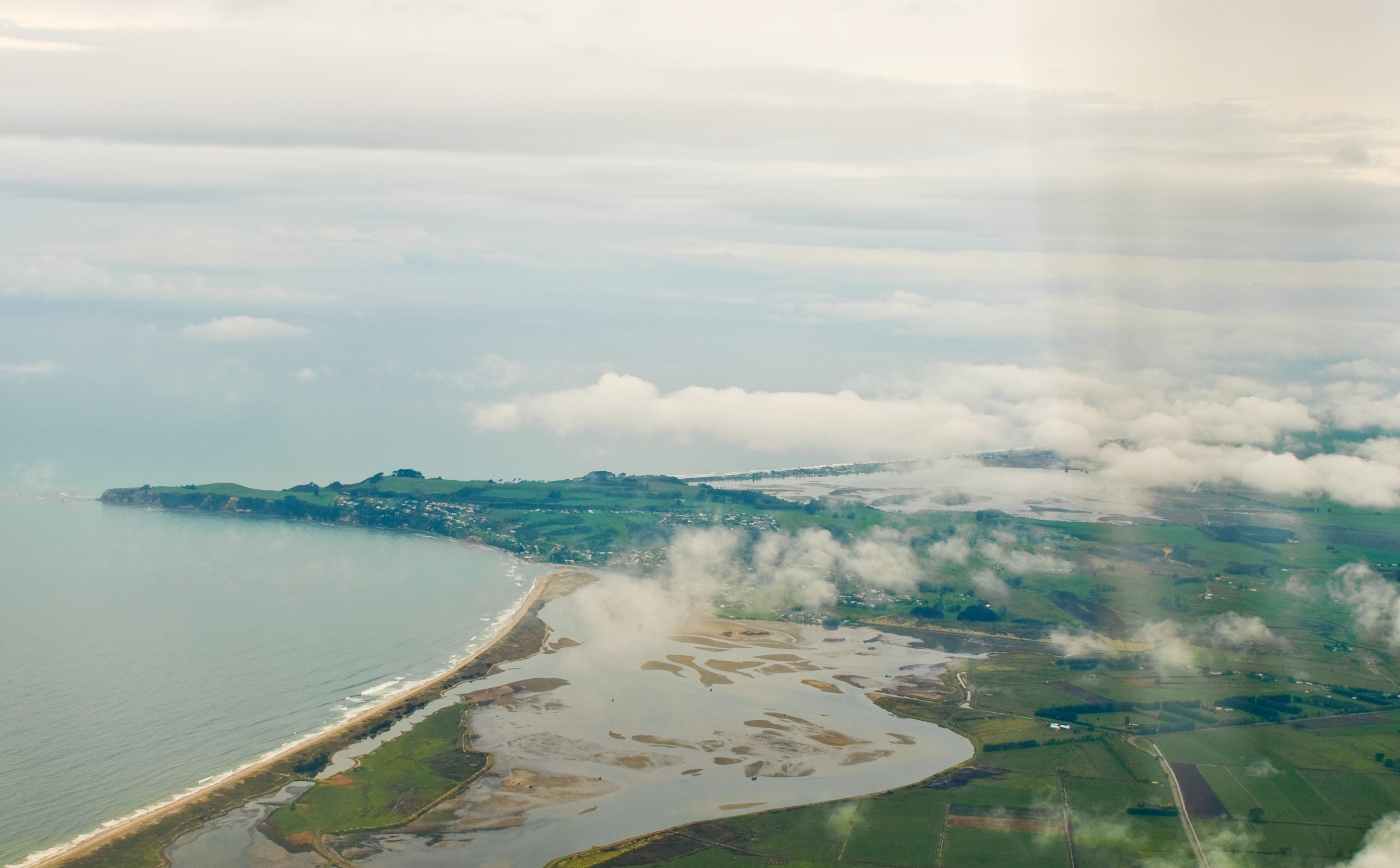
Maketu, seen from the west.

After Ngāi Te Rangi conquered Maketu from Te Arawa, they began to launch raids and tribute collecting missions inland. One of these missions resulted in Ngāi Te Rangi sacking Pakotore, the main pā of Tuteamutu. As a result, the people of Arawa, together with Tapuika and Waitaha, sought to drive Ngāi Te Rangi out of Maketu. Taiwere pulled together a large war party and led it to Maketu, but he was confronted by Ngāi Te Rangi in the Kawa swamp south of Maketu and was killed. Moekaha gathered a second army, but he too was intercepted, defeated, and killed in the Kawa swamp.

Meanwhile, Ngāti Whakahinga from Whakatane and Ngariki of Te Aitanga-a-Māhaki from Opotiki entered the Maketu region. Two chiefs of Tapuika, Paruhiterangi and Te Hanananui, decided to surrender their villages, Takaihuahua and Paraoa, to the invaded. However, they soon were at war with Ngāti Whakahinga. Tapuika were victorious at Te Karaka and Te Kakaho. Te Ariariterangi allied with Tapuika and Ngāti Rangiwewehi.

=== Battle of Kakaho ===
After his brother's defeats, Te Ariariterangi gathered a much larger force. He forged an alliance with Ngāti Hauā, by arranging for a woman of Tapuika called Tamanga-arangi to be married to their chief Hauā and for Hauā's daughter Kaimatai to be married to his own son Te Roro-o-te-rangi. By marrying another Tapuika woman, Peuerangi, to Te Ruinga, he brought the people of Hauraki into his coalition. A third woman, Ngaparitau was married to yet another group, perhaps Waitahaturauta of Otamarakau.

Finally, Te Ariariterangi gathered his forces together and led them along the beach from Te Tumu to the Kakaho ford, where they were intercepted by Ngāi Te Rangi. After a difficult fight, the Arawa forces were defeated and Te Ariariterangi was killed, along with Hauā. According to one story, Te Ariariterangi was extraordinarily boastful, saying "Kotahi tangata ki Hawaiki ko Whakatau anake, kotahi ki Aotearoa ko Ariariterangi anake" (there was only one man at Hawaiki: Whakatau; there is only one man in Aotearoa: Ariariterangi). This had insulted all his followers and allies, so they pretended to retreat into the sea at Kakaho, but then disappeared inland, leaving him alone to be captured. He was killed by Ngāi Te Rangi and presumably eaten.

It was left to his son, Te Roro-o-te-rangi, to organise a fourth attack on Maketu, which finally resulted in peace being made between Te Arawa and Ngāi Te Rangi.

== Family ==
Te Ariariterangi had three children:

- Te Roro-o-te-rangi
- Te Kata

- Te Rangiiwaho

- Tūnohopū

- Pānuiomārama

- Tāeotū

- Hinetai

- Taimaaroa

- Ngawaero, who was captured by Ngāti Tūwharetoa and married to the Ngāti Tūwharetoa chief Tū-te-tawhā Whare-oneone.

== Bibliography ==
- Grace, John Te Herekiekie (1959). Tuwharetoa: The history of the Maori people of the Taupo District. Auckland [N.Z.]: A.H. & A.W. Reed.
- Stafford, D.M. (1967). Te Arawa: A History of the Arawa People. Rotorua, New Zealand: A.H. & A.W. Reed.
- Steedman, J.A.W. (1984). Ngā Ohaaki o ngā Whānau o Tauranga Moana: Māori History and Genealogy of the Bay of Plenty.
- Stokes, Evelyn Mary (1992). Te Raupatu o Tauranga Moana: Vol 2 Documents relating to tribal history, confiscation and reallocation of Tauranga lands. Waitangi Tribunal.
