= The Romance of Hine-moa =

1927 film

The Romance of Hine-Moa
- Directed by: Gustav Pauli
- Written by: Gustav Pauli
- Produced by: Gustav Pauli
- Cinematography: Gustav Pauli
- Release date: 1927
- Running time: 5500 ft (6 reel); 83 minutes
- Country: United Kingdom
- Language: English

The Romance of Hine-Moa is a 1927 British film set in New Zealand, written, directed and produced for Gaumont British by Gustav Pauli. It is now lost. The trade journal Bioscope said it was a "charming love story illustrating an old Maori legend, acted entirely by Maoris in beautiful and interesting native surroundongs".

== Plot ==
The plot is the traditional story of the love of Hinemoa and Tutanekai from rival tribes. Pauli's version shifts the emphasis from Hinemoa's swim across the lake to meet her lover to Tutanekai's ordeal going through the Valley of Fire, the crater of an active volcano. Released in 1927, but New Zealand Prime Minister Gordon Coates attended a special showing by Gaumont in England on 16 December 1926.

== Cast ==
- Maata Hurihanganui ... Hine-Moa
- Akuhato ... Tutanekai
