= Hinemoa =

Te Arawa woman

Hinemoa's swim.
1 Owhata
2 Mokoia island

Hinemoa was a woman of the Te Arawa, known in Māori tradition for swimming across Lake Rotorua to Mokoia island to be with Tūtānekai, with whom she was in love. The story has been widely transmitted and forms the basis for one version of the song Pokarekare Ana. It has also been adapted into several silent film productions.

== Life ==
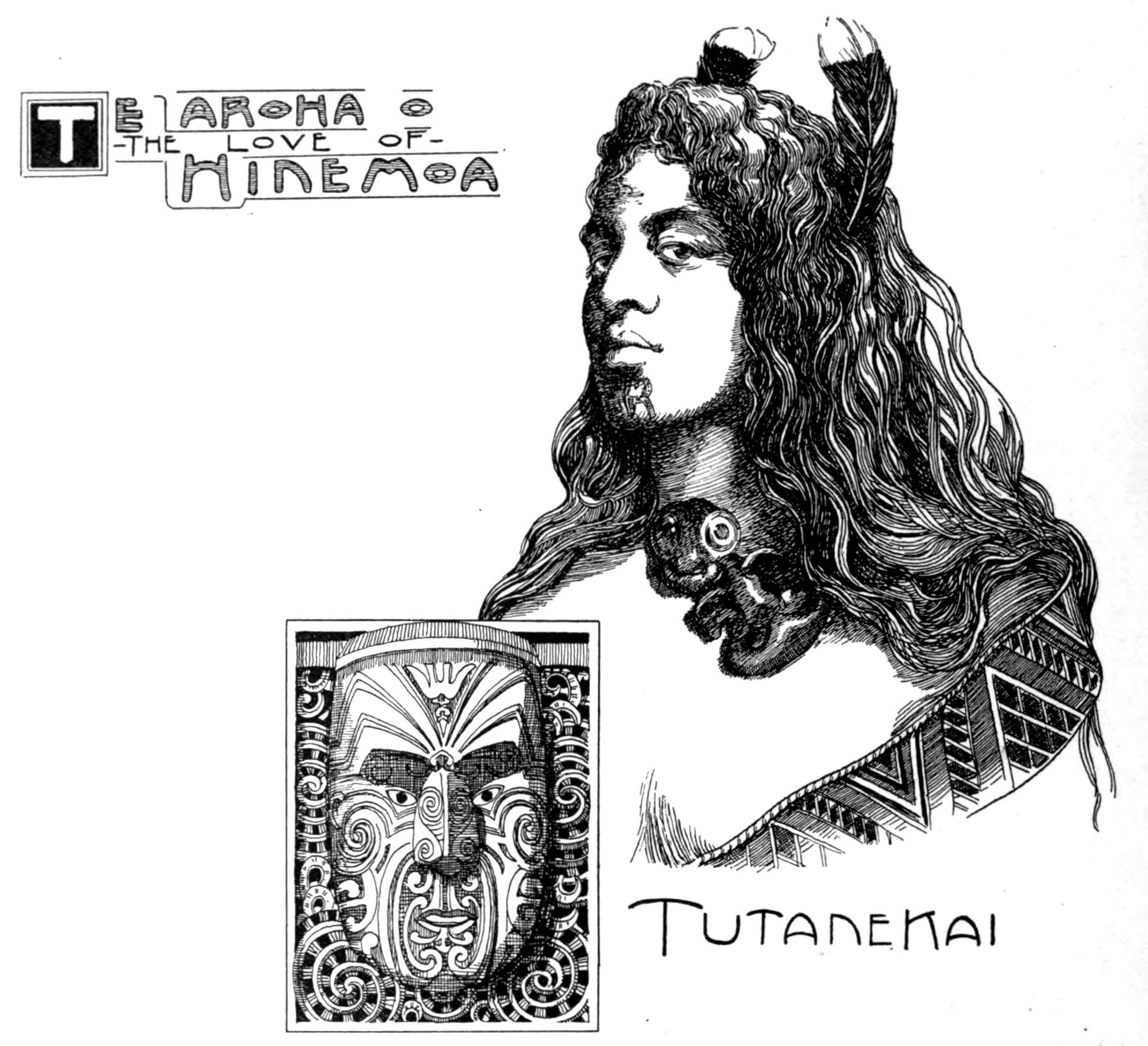
Depiction of Hinemoa and Tūtānekai in Wilhelm Dittmer, Te Tohunga, 1907.

Hinemoa was born at Owhata on the southeast shore of Lake Rotorua. Her father was Umukaria and her mother was Hinemaru. Through her father, she was a great-granddaughter of Taketakehikuroa and Uenukukōpako, the two sons of Tuhourangi, and thus a descendant of Tama-te-kapua, the captain of the Arawa. She was declared a puhi (sacred virgin). Many men sought to marry her, but the people of Owhata refused them all.

=== Hinemoa's swim ===
At various hui (meetings), Hinemoa saw Tūtānekai displaying his skill with the taiaha (spear) and the mere (club). He was the result of an illicit affair between Tūwharetoa i te Aupōuri and Rangiuru, the wife of Hinemoa's great-uncle Whakaue-kaipapa. The pair eventually fell in love, although they had never been able to speak with one another.

Tūtānekai used to sit on the hill above Kaiweka with his friend Tiki and play music for Hinemoa on a flute called Murirangiranga. This is said to be the same as a flute now in the Auckland Museum. The music was heard by Hinemoa at her home on the shore of Lake Rotorua and she determined to travel to Mokoia and marry Tūtānekai. Since her people pulled the canoes far out of the water every night to keep her from escaping, she went to Iri iri kapua rock with six calabashes and converted them into a flotation device. Then she went to the beach at Wairerewai and began the 3.2 km swim to Mokoia Island in the dark. Part way through the swim she reached the stump Hinewhata, which was used when fishing for kōura (crayfish). Finally, she made it to Mokoia, but by now she was very cold, so she went to the Waikimihia hot spring to warm up.

While Hinemoa was bathing at Waikimihia, Tūtānekai became thirsty and sent a slave to get him a gourd of water from the lake. Hinemoa saw him passing by and, mimicking a man's voice, asked the slave whom he was fetching water for. When the slave told her, she smashed the gourd. This happened a second time and then Tūtānekai decided to go down to Waikimihia to confront the man who was smashing his gourds. He went down wearing a rapaki (kilt), a kahakaha cloak (i.e. a flax under-cloak), and a tawaru cloak. When he approached Waikimihia, Hinemoa hid under and overhanging rock, but Tūtānekai reached down and pulled her up by the hair, demanding to know who the stranger was. At this point Hinemoa revealed her identity and Tūtānekai dressed her in one of his cloaks. The two of them went back to Tūtānekai's house and were married.

The marriage was discovered the next morning, when Tūtānekai failed to rise early. Whakaue-kaipapa sent a slave to find out the reason and this slave reported that he had seen four feet poking out of the bedding in the house. Whakaue-kaipapa sent him back the second time to confirm this and the slave came back declaring that the new woman was Hinemoa. At this point Hinemoa's father Umukaria arrived with his fleet and, although everyone expected that he would try to take Hinemoa away, he instead consented to the match.

=== Later life ===
After the marriage, Tūtānekai's brothers settled on the mainland at Weriweri and Puhirua, while Tūtānekai and Hinemoa remained on Mokoia. Tūtānekai established a new pā on the summit of the island, called Te Whetengu. From there, he carved a set of steps in the cliffside leading down to a cave where he kept a stone statue of a female atua called Horoirangi, which remained there until it was relocated to Auckland Museum in the early twentieth century.

Hinemoa's father was ambushed and killed at Lake Rotokakahi by Ngāti Pikiao, during a conflict between them and Tūtānekai. Tūtānekai sacked the Ngāti Pikiao settlement of Moura in revenge. Later on, their younger son, Tamakuri, was accidentally killed at Tumoana pā on Lake Rotoiti by the Tuhourangi. Tūtānekai arranged for Tumoana to be sacked in revenge. When Tūtānekai died at Weriweri, Hinemoa composed a lament, which is still sung for his descendants:

Te tau, e; te tau a te rau, ka wehe i a au, e,
Aha i wehe ai? ka uru kei roto, te niho o Mokoroa,
Tangi ana, te wheoro, ki te tuakiri,
He whana taua nei, te wa o te mamae,
Tikina mai au, whakawairekatia,
Kia hoki ake ai, te korou ki te ao; e,
Ekore hoki ake, he ngaki mate pea, e.
Keria mai au, ki te ruagaeroa, e,
A ngaro ai ra, te wairua.

Translation:

Hinemoa's son, Whatumairangi, committed adultery with the Uruhina, the wife of Hinemoa's brother Wahiao. He called upon Te Apiti of Ngati Apumoana to lead a war party against Whatumairangi in revenge. The forces met in battle at Pikirangi and Whatumairangi was killed. The survivors wanted to get revenge on Wahiao for his role in Whatumairangi's death. They sent Hinemoa to meet with him at Te Uenga on the northeast shore of Rotorua to open peace negotiations. While his guard was lowered, the people attacked and killed Wahiao.

== Family ==
Tūtānekai and Hinemoa had two children, both born at Kaiweka:

- Whatumairangi, who married his cousin Parehina, daughter of Tuteati:

- Taiwere, who married Tāmiuru:

- Pūkaki.

- Tamakuri, who was killed at Tumoana pā.

== Legacy ==
Promotional still from Hinemoa (1915).

The story of Hinemoa's swim is one of the most well-known Māori love stories and has been retold many times. The earliest written account was produced by Wiremu Maihi Te Rangikāheke in 1849. It is referenced in the Te Arawa version of the widely known traditional Māori love song "Pōkarekare Ana". The story was the basis of two silent films: Hinemoa, shot by French director Gaston Méliès in 1913, and Hinemoa, shot by George Tarr in 1914. The latter was claimed to be the first feature film produced in New Zealand. A third film, The Romance of Hine-moa was directed by Gustav Pauli in 1927.

Since the 1960s or 1970s, Hinemoa's swim has been commemorated by an annual swimming race known as the "Hinemoa Swim". Until the late 1980s, this swim followed the route of Hinemoa's legendary swim, but trouble with weather and water pollution meant that it had to be cancelled. Since 1994, the race has instead taken place annually on Lake Tikitapu as a 2 km non-wetsuit swim, as part of the Blue Lake Multisport Festival. There are two trophies, a larger Hinemoa for fastest female swim, and a smaller Tutanekai, for fastest male swim.

Tekoteko woodcarvings of the pair, made by Albert Te Pou, were installed in central Rotorua in 1994.

In May 2016, the Birkenhead Brewering Company of Auckland produced a series of craft beers depicting Hinemoa and Tutanekai on the labels, which prompted outcry from descendants of Hinemoa and Tutanekai, Te Arawa, and many other Māori. In August, the brewery's director apologised and removed the labels.

== Bibliography ==
- Grey, Sir George (1865). "The Story of Hinemoa and Tutanekai". Polynesian Mythology – via National Library of New Zealand.
- Grace, John Te Herekiekie (1970) [1959]. Tuwharetoa: The history of the Maori people of the Taupo District. Auckland [N.Z.]: A.H. & A.W. Reed. ISBN 9780589003739.
- Stafford, D.M. (1967). Te Arawa: A History of the Arawa People. Rotorua, New Zealand: A.H. & A.W. Reed.
