= Pongakawa =

Rural community in the Bay of Plenty, New Zealand

- Interactive map of Pongakawa
- Coordinates: 37.836741°S 176.476480°E
- Country: New Zealand
- Region: Bay of Plenty
- Territorial authority: Western Bay of Plenty
- Ward: Maketu-Te Puke Ward
- Established: pre-European
- Electorates: East Cape; Waiariki (Māori)

Government
  - Territorial authority: Western Bay of Plenty District Council
  - Regional council: Bay of Plenty Regional Council
  - Mayor of Western Bay of Plenty: James Denyer
  - East Cape MP: Dana Kirkpatrick
  - Waiariki MP: Rawiri Waititi

Area
  - Total: 52.20 km^{2} (20.15 sq mi)
- Elevation: 27 m (89 ft)

Population (2023 Census)
  - Total: 459
  - Density: 8.79/km^{2} (22.8/sq mi)
- Time zone: UTC+12 (NZST)
  - Summer (DST): UTC+13 (NZDT)
- Postcode: 3189
- Area code: 07

Pongakawa is a rural community in the Bay of Plenty of New Zealand's North Island. State Highway 2 runs through it.

The name of the settlement comes from Māori terms meaning "Bitter ferns".

== Demographics ==
Pongakawa community covers 52.20 km^{2} (20.15 sq mi). It is part of the larger Pongakawa statistical area.

Historical population for Pongakawa community
Year	Pop.	±% p.a.
2006	438	—
2013	417	−0.70%
2018	432	+0.71%
2023	459	+1.22%

The community had a population of 459 in the 2023 New Zealand census, an increase of 27 people (6.2%) since the 2018 census, and an increase of 42 people (10.1%) since the 2013 census. There were 252 males and 210 females in 153 dwellings. 1.3% of people identified as LGBTIQ+. There were 105 people (22.9%) aged under 15 years, 78 (17.0%) aged 15 to 29, 219 (47.7%) aged 30 to 64, and 57 (12.4%) aged 65 or older.

People could identify as more than one ethnicity. The results were 89.5% European (Pākehā); 22.2% Māori; 0.7% Pasifika; 3.3% Asian; 0.7% Middle Eastern, Latin American and African New Zealanders (MELAA); and 3.9% other, which includes people giving their ethnicity as "New Zealander". English was spoken by 96.7%, Māori by 3.3%, and other languages by 6.5%. No language could be spoken by 2.6% (e.g. too young to talk). The percentage of people born overseas was 11.8, compared with 28.8% nationally.

Religious affiliations were 22.9% Christian, 1.3% Māori religious beliefs, and 3.3% other religions. People who answered that they had no religion were 64.7%, and 9.2% of people did not answer the census question.

Of those at least 15 years old, 57 (16.1%) people had a bachelor's or higher degree, 210 (59.3%) had a post-high school certificate or diploma, and 84 (23.7%) people exclusively held high school qualifications. 48 people (13.6%) earned over $100,000 compared to 12.1% nationally. The employment status of those at least 15 was 210 (59.3%) full-time, 81 (22.9%) part-time, and 3 (0.8%) unemployed.

=== Pongakawa statistical area ===
Pongakawa statistical area, which also includes Paengaroa and Otamarakau, covers 389.03 km^{2} (150.21 sq mi) and had an estimated population of 3,510 as of June 2025, with a population density of 9.0 people per km^{2}.

"Historical population for the statistical area
Year	Pop.	±% p.a.
2006	2,700	—
2013	2,673	−0.14%
2018	3,081	+2.88%
2023	3,261	+1.14%

Pongakawa statistical area had a population of 3,261 in the 2023 New Zealand census, an increase of 180 people (5.8%) since the 2018 census, and an increase of 588 people (22.0%) since the 2013 census. There were 1,725 males, 1,527 females, and 9 people of other genders in 1,038 dwellings. 1.5% of people identified as LGBTIQ+. The median age was 36.1 years (compared with 38.1 years nationally). There were 759 people (23.3%) aged under 15 years, 564 (17.3%) aged 15 to 29, 1,500 (46.0%) aged 30 to 64, and 438 (13.4%) aged 65 or older.

People could identify as more than one ethnicity. The results were 81.3% European (Pākehā); 26.5% Māori; 3.9% Pasifika; 4.1% Asian; 1.1% Middle Eastern, Latin American and African New Zealanders (MELAA); and 3.3% other, which includes people giving their ethnicity as "New Zealander". English was spoken by 96.3%, Māori by 6.4%, Samoan by 0.3%, and other languages by 7.3%. No language could be spoken by 2.4% (e.g. too young to talk). New Zealand Sign Language was known by 0.3%. The percentage of people born overseas was 13.2, compared with 28.8% nationally.

Religious affiliations were 22.3% Christian, 0.7% Hindu, 0.2% Islam, 2.0% Māori religious beliefs, 0.5% Buddhist, 0.4% New Age, 0.1% Jewish, and 1.8% other religions. People who answered that they had no religion were 62.2%, and 9.8% of people did not answer the census question.

Of those at least 15 years old, 351 (14.0%) people had a bachelor's or higher degree, 1,464 (58.5%) had a post-high school certificate or diploma, and 681 (27.2%) people exclusively held high school qualifications. The median income was $42,100, compared with $41,500 nationally. 261 people (10.4%) earned over $100,000 compared to 12.1% nationally. The employment status of those at least 15 was 1,416 (56.6%) full-time, 402 (16.1%) part-time, and 36 (1.4%) unemployed.

== Marae ==
The local Tokerau Marae and Pikiao meeting house are a traditional meeting ground of the Ngāti Pikiao tribe.

== Education ==
Pongakawa School is a co-educational state primary school for Year 1 to 8 students, with a roll of 315 as of July 2026. It opened in 1892.
