= Matuatonga =

Māori stone sculpture in New Zealand

Matuatonga is a Māori stone sculpture on Mokoia Island, Lake Rotorua, New Zealand, which is a mauri (relic) or whakapoko (guardian statue) and belongs to Ngāti Whakaue, Ngāti Rangiteaorere, and other tribes of Te Arawa. It is the most famous atua kumara (agricultural god) and was traditionally involved in rituals connected to the sowing of the annual kumara (sweet potato) crop. The sculpture has a male figure carved on each side, one representing Matuatonga, god of growth, and the other Matuatehe, god of decay. According to some traditions, Matuatonga was brought to New Zealand from Hawaiki c. 1350. It was buried in the 1820s and exhumed in 1866, at which point a smaller sculpture was given to Governor George Grey and deposited in the Auckland Museum. Some sources claim that this smaller sculpture is the "true" Matuatonga and that the one on Mokoia today is only a replica.

== Description ==
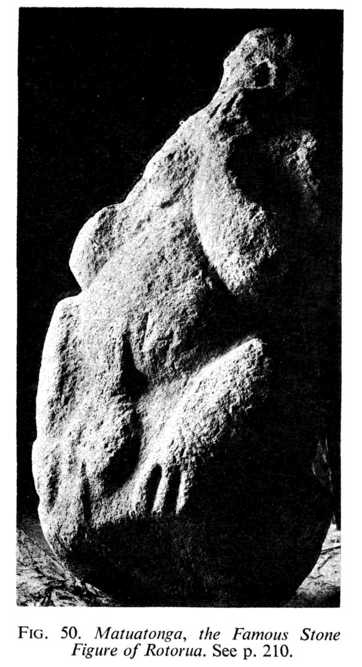
Image of Matuatonga, from Elsdon Best, Maori Agriculture.

Matuatonga is about 1.3 metres high and made from the local rhyolite stone of Mokoia. It is roughly pear shaped, with a figure carved in relief on each side. The figure on the front side is depicted with his left hand raised to his face, a gesture which signifies conception, his legs spread, and an erect penis. The figure on the rear side also has an erect penis, but his arms are at his sides. In 1985, Matuatonga stood outdoors on a rock on Mokoia, near where kumara had traditionally been planted, and was covered in lichen.

== History ==
According to tradition, Matuatonga was brought to New Zealand from Hawaiki in the Arawa canoe. Matuatonga, as god of growth, was often contrasted with another atua, Matuatehe, god of decay, who is identified with the figure on the rear side of the sculpture. In pre-European times, the tribes around Lake Rotorua would travel to the location where Matuatonga stood on Mokoia Island each year during the planting season for the kūmara (sweet potato). There they held a ceremony, during which they touched the kumara seeds that they were about to plant to the statue. This was meant to prevent the crop from being destroyed by disease or cold weather. A traditional saying, Māori: Kia tuu tangatanga te ara ki Mokoia, "Let the way be open to Mokoia," recalls this pilgrimage.

During the Musket Wars of the 1820s, Matuatonga was buried on Mokoia. When governor George Grey visited Mokoia in 1866, Matuatonga was dug up and a small mauri was given to Grey. This mauri was deposited in the Auckland Museum. It was still there as of 1923 and 2007. It is 40.6 cm high, made of red granite from the area around New Plymouth, and is alternatively called Haukakenga.

It is unclear what relationship the mauri given to Grey had to Matuatonga. According to Gilbert Mair the mauri given to Grey, which he calls Uenuku-kopako, had been taken from Taranaki by a war party led by Tūwhare and Patuone around 1820. An undated letter from Josiah Martin in the Auckland Museum Collection claims that the mauri given to Grey was the true Matuatonga and that the one that remained on Mokoia island (described and depicted above) was a replica, manufactured to satisfy the common people, who were not allowed to see the true mauri. According to Grey's own account, given in 1892, the mauri that was exhumed was the large one described above; he says he had it reburied, but accepted a smaller one; he says that one of them was a replica, but it is unclear which one he means.

In 1883, one Keepa Ngawhau took the large mauri away in the night and sold it to a European settler, Robert Graham for £100. When the rest of the tribe found out, they protested and, two years later, a judge forced Graham to return it to Mokoia. In 1897, according to Margaret Bullock, Matuatonga was kept on the island in a locked wooden temple and "guarded with something like jealous care." In 1985, Matuatonga stood outdoors on a rock on Mokoia, near where kumara had traditionally been planted, and was covered in lichen. As of 2022, Matuatonga is still located on Mokoia.

== Bibliography ==
- Best, Elsdon (1925). Maori Agriculture. Wellington: A. R. Shearer. p. 210.
- Ell, Gordon (1985). Shadows on the Land: Signs from the Maori Past. Auckland: Bush Press. ISBN 978-0-908608-25-6.
- Inia, Raimona (4 August 2022). "Guardian Matuatonga stands vigil on Mokoia". NZ Herald.
- Mead, Hirini Moko; Grove, Neil (2004). Nga Pepeha a Nga Tipuna: The Sayings of the Ancestors. Victoria University Press. ISBN 978-0-86473-462-4.
- Midgley, Aneleh (2007). "Strange treasures from many lands …" the art collections of Sir George Grey, K.C.B. (1812-1898) (M.A. (hons) thesis). University of Auckland.
- Simmons, D. R. (1986). Iconography of New Zealand Maori Religion. Leiden: Brill. ISBN 978-90-04-07588-7.
- Skinner, H. D. (1923). "Notes and Queries". The Journal of the Polynesian Society. 32 (3(127)): 184–186. ISSN 0032-4000. JSTOR 20701933.
- Stafford, D. M. (1967). Te Arawa: A History of the Arawa People. Rotorua, New Zealand: A.H. & A.W. Reed.
- Waitangi Tribunal (14 June 2013). Ngati Rangiteaorere and Ngati Rangiteaorere Koromatua Council and The Crown: Deed of Settlement of Historical Claims (PDF). Wellington: The Crown.
