= Tūtānekai =

New Zealand Māori rangatira (chief)

Places in the life of Tūtānekai.
1 Mokoia island
2 Owhata
3 Motutawa island
4 Moura
5 Te Whetengu
6 Tumoana
7 Weriweri

Tūtānekai was a Māori rangatira (chief) of the iwi Ngāti Whakaue in the Te Arawa confederation of tribes. He was an illegitimate son of Tūwharetoa i te Aupōuri and is most famous for his romance with Hinemoa, which is referenced in the song Pōkarekare Ana. Later on, he came into conflict with Ngāti Pikiao, driving them away from lake Rotorua and sacking their pā at Moura on Lake Tarawera. Still later, he formed an alliance with Ngāti Pikiao in order to get revenge on Tuhourangi at Tumoana for the accidental death of his son.

== Life ==
Tūtānekai's mother was Rangiuru, the wife of Whakaue-kaipapa, the ancestor Ngāti Whakaue. The pair lived at Kaiweka pā on Mokoia island in Lake Rotorua. On a visit to the island, Tūwharetoa i te Aupōuri, the namesake of Ngāti Tūwharetoa, slept with Rangiuru, resulting in Tūtānekai, whom Whakauekaipapa chose to raise as one of his own children. Tūtānekai had three half-brothers (Whakaue-kaipapa's legitimate children): Tawakeheimoa, Tuteaiti, and Ngararanui. He also had one half-sister, Tupaharanui, who later married Tūtānekai's best friend, Tiki.

=== Romance with Hinemoa ===
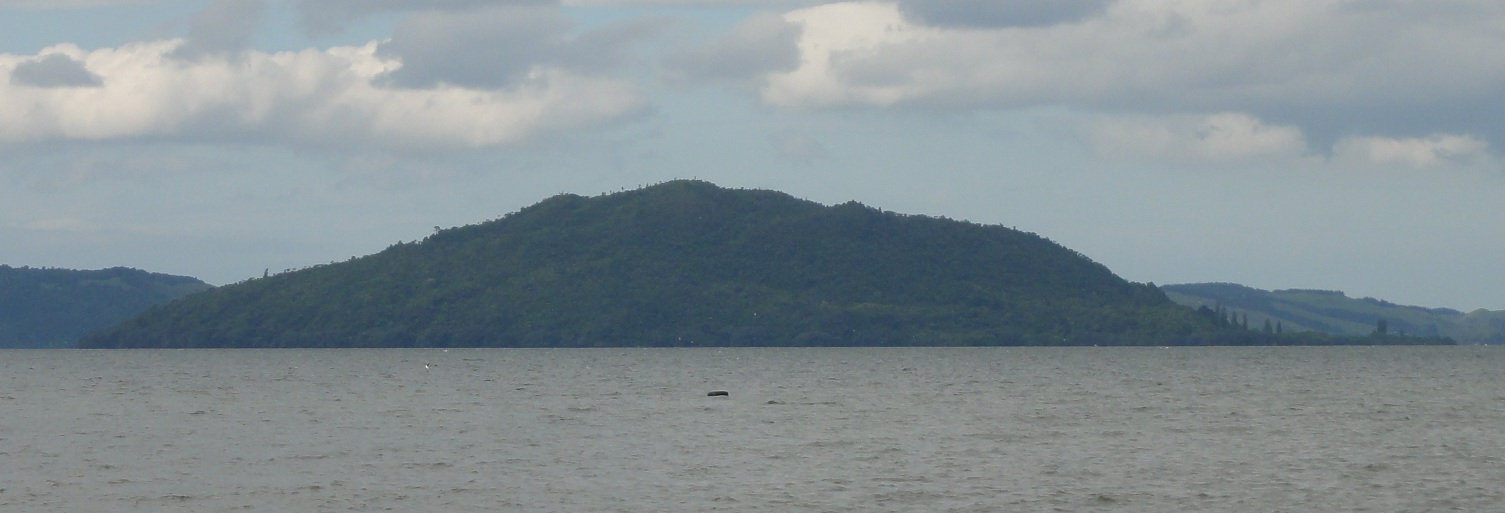
Mokoia Island, Lake Rotorua.

There was a puhi (sacred virgin) at Owhata, called Hinemoa, who was the daughter of Umukaria (and thus a grand-niece of Whakauekaipapa). Many men sought to marry her, including Tūtānekai's older brothers, but the people of Owhata refused them all. Hinemoa saw Tūtānekai displaying his skill with the taiaha (spear) and the mere (club) at various hui (meetings) and the pair eventually fell in love, although they had never been able to speak with one another.

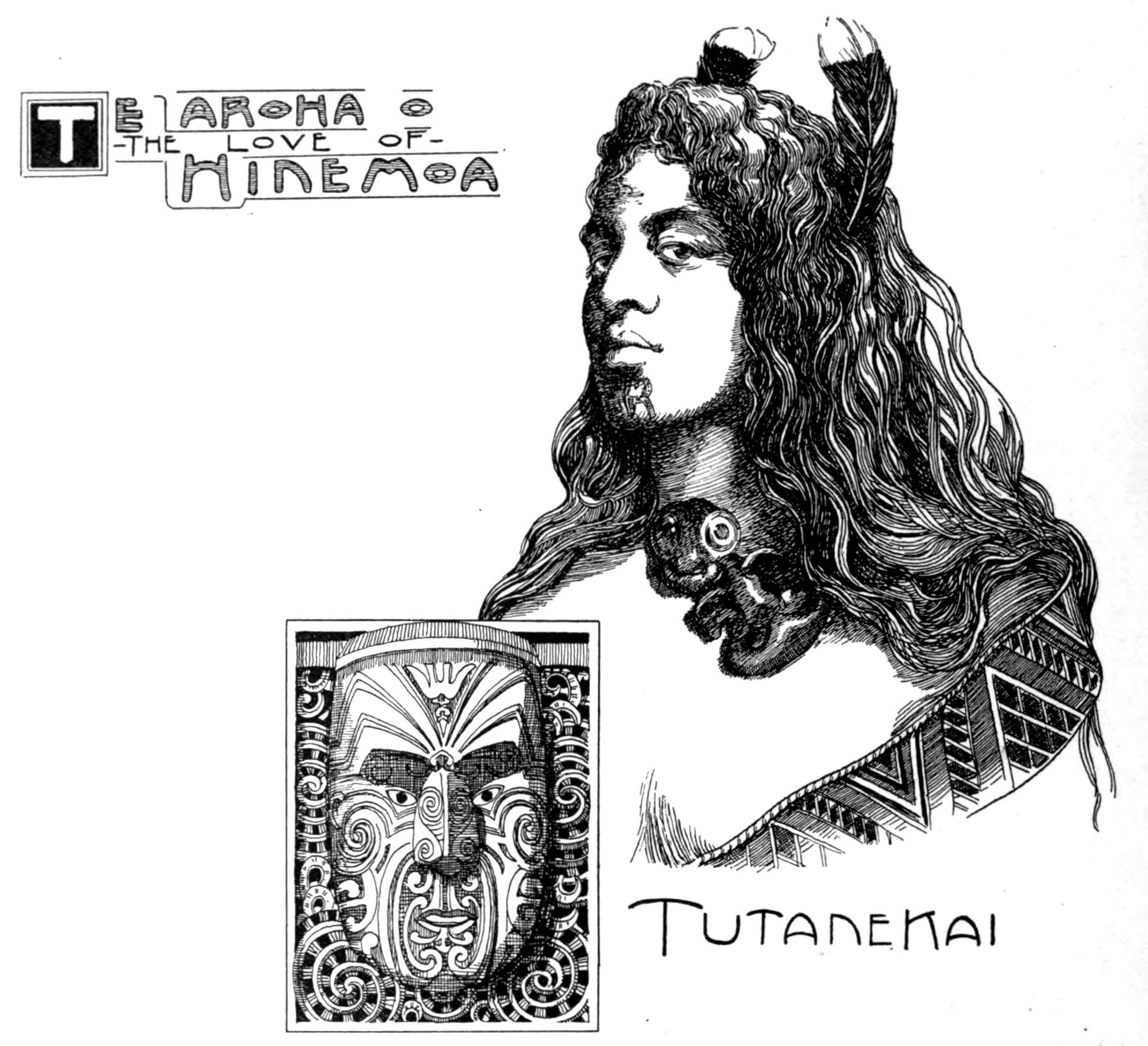
Depiction of Hinemoa and Tūtānekai in Wilhelm Dittmer, Te Tohunga, 1907.

Tūtānekai used to sit on the hill above Kaiweka with his friend Tiki and play music for Hinemoa on a flute called Murirangiranga. This is said to be the same as a flute now in the Auckland Museum. The music was heard by Hinemoa at her home on the shore of Lake Rotorua and she determined to travel to Mokoia and marry Tūtānekai. Since her people pulled the canoes far out of the water every night to keep her from escaping, she went to Iri iri kapua rock with six calabashes and converted them into a flotation device. Then she went to the beach at Wairerewai and began the 3.2 km swim to Mokoia Island in the dark. Part way through the swim she reached the stump Hinewhata, which was used when fishing for kōura (crayfish). Finally, she made it to Mokoia, but by now she was very cold, so she went to the Waikimihia hot spring to warm up.

While Hinemoa was bathing at Waikimihia, Tūtānekai became thirsty and sent a slave to get him a gourd of water from the lake. Hinemoa saw him passing by and, mimicking a man's voice, asked the slave whom he was fetching water for. When the slave told her, she smashed the gourd. This happened a second time and then Tūtānekai decided to go down to Waikimihia to confront the man who was smashing his gourds. He went down wearing a rapaki (kilt), a kahakaha cloak (i.e. a flax under-cloak), and a tawaru cloak. When he approached Waikimihia, Hinemoa hid under and overhanging rock, but Tūtānekai reached down and pulled her up by the hair, demanding to know who the stranger was. At this point Hinemoa revealed her identity and Tūtānekai dressed her in one of his cloaks. The two of them went back to Tūtānekai's house and were married.

The marriage was discovered the next morning, when Tūtānekai failed to rise early. Whakaue-kaipapa sent a slave to find out the reason and this slave reported that he had seen four feet poking out of the bedding in the house. Whakaue-kaipapa sent him back the second time to confirm this and the slave came back declaring that the new woman was Hinemoa. At this point Hinemoa's father Umukaria arrived with his fleet and, although everyone expected that he would try to take Hinemoa away, he instead consented to the match.

After the marriage, Tūtānekai's brothers settled on the mainland at Weriweri and Puhirua, while Tūtānekai and Hinemoa remained on Mokoia. Tūtānekai established a new pā on the summit of the island, called Te Whetengu. From there, he carved a set of steps in the cliffside leading down to a cave where he kept a stone statue of a female atua called Horoirangi, which remained there until it was relocated to Auckland Museum in the early twentieth century.

=== Conflict with Ngati Pikiao ===
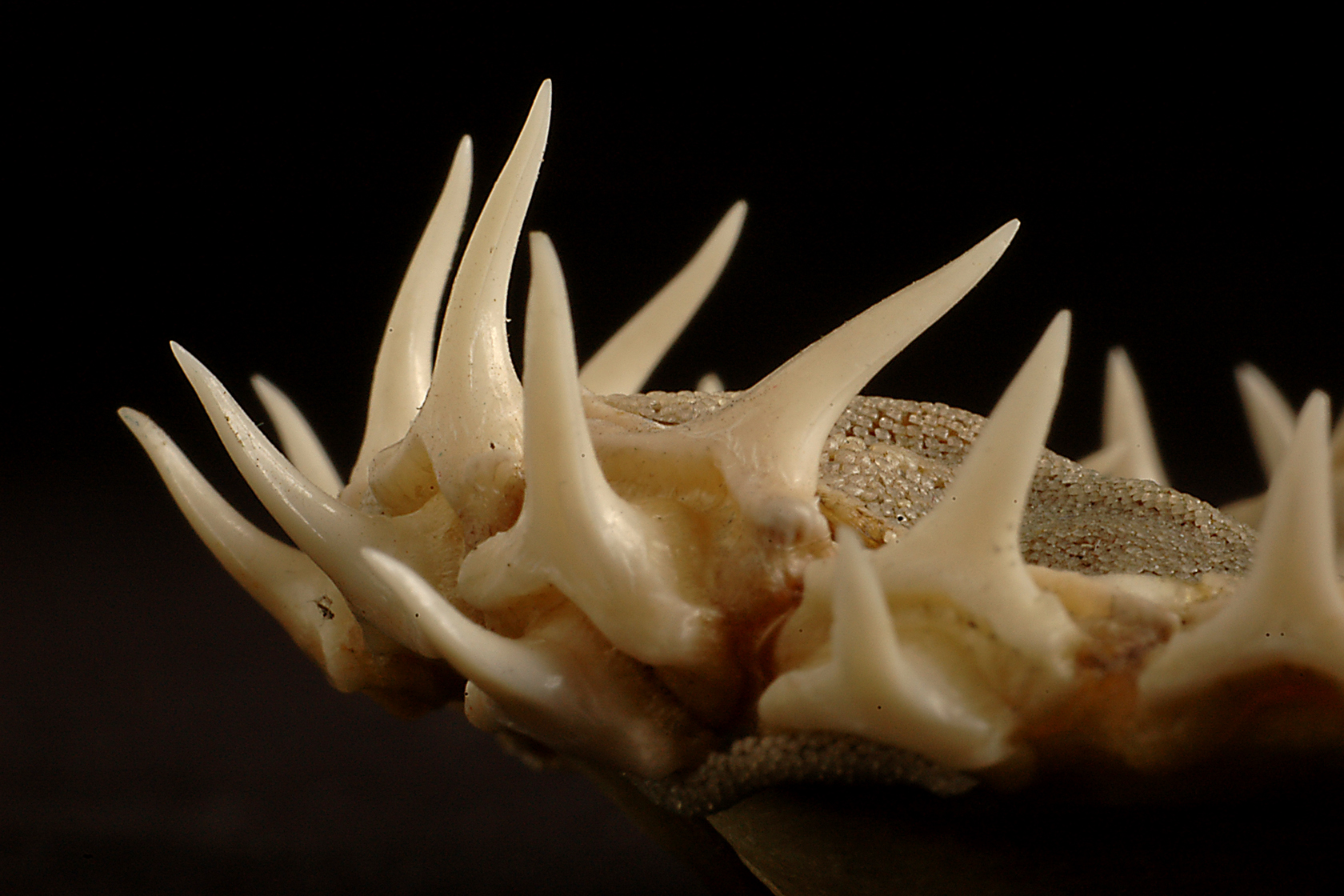
Teeth of a mako shark.

While visiting the coast, Tūtānekai received two mako shark's teeth, named Taipupuhi and Tuperenui, which he wore as earrings. He lost the teeth in the sand at the beach at Ruato on Lake Rotoiti, but they were found and returned to him by Morewhati, son of Pikiao. Tūtānekai was so grateful for this that he gave Morewhati the tooth called Tuperenui. Shortly after this, however, Morewhati traded Tuperenui to a man from Taupō in exchange for a feather cloak called Iringangarangi. Tūtānekai was so angry at this, that he led a group to Morewhati's home, where they killed him. When they reached Mourea, they encountered Morewhati's brother, Tamakari, who criticised Tūtānekai severely for killing his brother. Tūtānekai killed him as well and stuck the heads on two stakes which were used to mark fishing grounds on Lake Rotorua. These stakes came to be called Morewhati and Tamakari and remained in place until the late nineteenth century.

A relative of Morewhati and Tamakari, Tiukahapa, convinced her husband Taharangi to allow her to go out in a canoe in the night, remove the two heads, and bring them back to Ngāti Pikiao. When Tūtānekai heard about this, he went to punish Tiukahapa, but Taharangi interceded and convinced Tūtānekai to let Tiukahapa go unpunished. After this, Ngāti Pikiao relocated from Owhata to Lake Rotokakahi and Lake Tarawera.

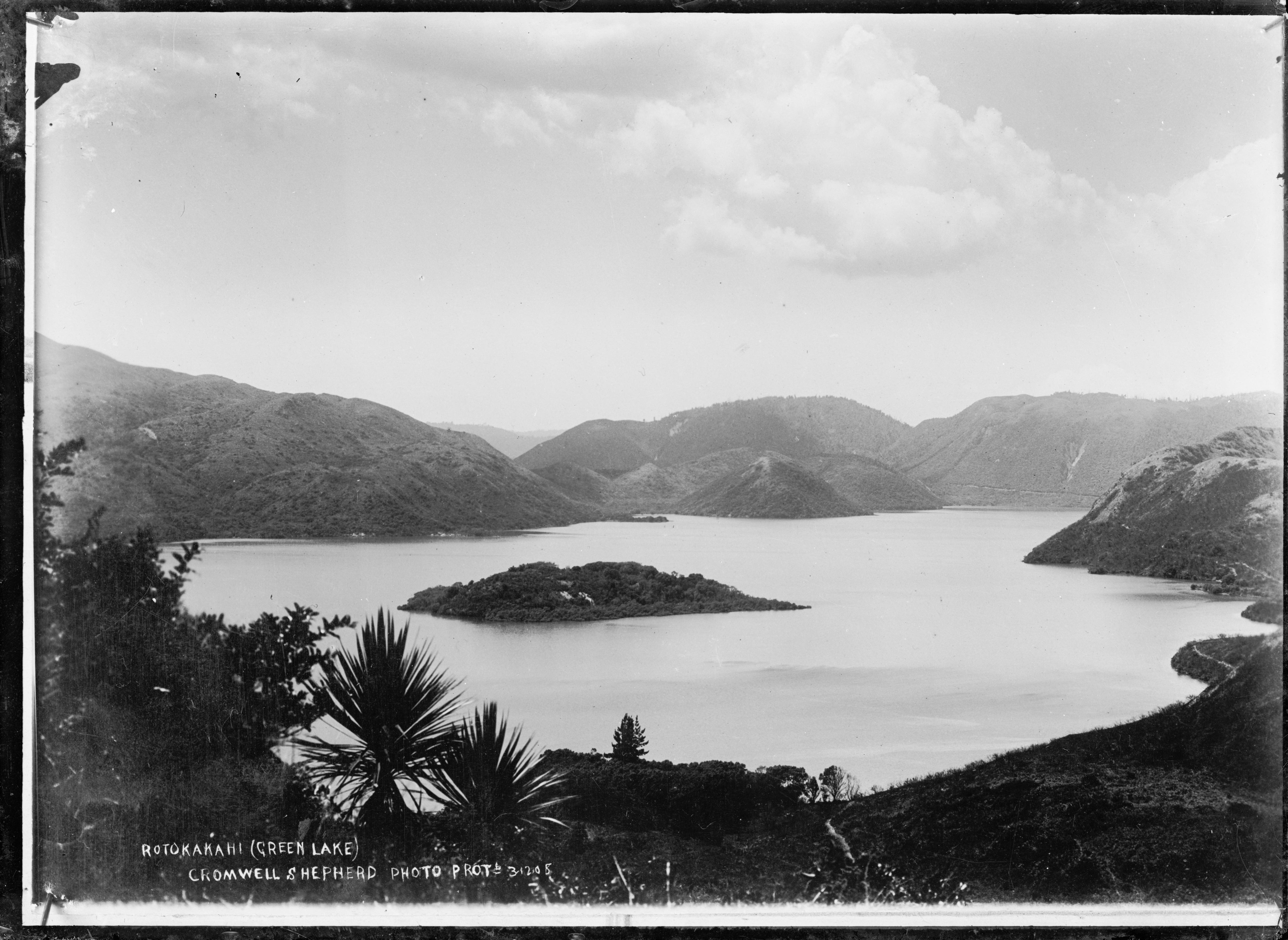
Motutawa island on Lake Rotokakahi.

Claiming to be grateful to Tūtānekai for his forebearance with Tiukahapa, Ngāti Pikiao invited Tūtānekai and the people of Mokoia to come to Motutawa island on Lake Rotokakahi in order to agree a peace treaty. As the people of Mokoia were setting out, Taharangi came to Tūtānekai and told him that Ngāti Pikiao were planning to ambush and kill him. Taharangi cut his hair, which made him tapu, and meant that he and Tūtānekai could delay their travel for a day. Meanwhile, some of the Mokoia people, led by Hinemoa's father, Umukaria, departed as planned and were ambushed at Rotokakahi. Umukaria was killed, along with Whakahorotangaroa and Kopaki. Another group of Mokoia people stopped in the lands of Te Rangitakaroro at Lake Okataina and, through his intercession, they escaped the massacre and returned to Mokoia safely.

While Tūtānekai was planning his revenge, a man of Ngāti Pikiao called Tuhiao travelled to Mokoia island. When Tūtānekai saw him travelling by in his canoe, he shouted out a challenge to him. The two fought to a draw and became friends. Tuhiao then told Tūtānekai that he could conquer Ngāti Pikiao's pā at Moura, which was surrounded by steep cliffs, by approaching from the south, throwing ropes up around a pōhutukawa tree growing out of the cliff-face and climbing up. Tūtānekai led a war party to Moura, along with his brother-in-law Wahiao and Wharetokotoko of Ngāti Tama from Papohatu. This party went to Rotokakahi and killed the Ngāti Tuteata people whom they found there, including the chief Te Inanga. They carried on to Te Tawaroa (modern Kariri) on the shore of Lake Tarawera, where they found Umukaria's head abandoned in a cave, which they named Te Rua o Umukaria (Umukaria's cave). They found Ohorongo pā abandoned also.

Finally, the war party reached Moura. They were approaching the pā at dawn and one of the lookouts caught sight of Tūtānekai, so he pretended to be a tree, standing perfectly still even though the air was thick with blood-sucking sandflies. When he finally began to tire, one of his men came up and quickly switched places with him. Twenty further men replaced each other, maintaining the illusion for most of the day. Late in the afternoon, they attacked the Moura and killed many people, including the chiefs Mokaikitariki, Tunoke, and Tutoa. A man called Tarainoke hid himself under a kumete (fishing net) floating in the lake, but he was spotted, captured, and taken as a slave. Pikiao and his followers were not at Moura when it was taken, but at Te Puwha on the eastern side of Taraera. After the attack they moved to Matata, then to Otamarakau and Pukehina, before being invited to Te Puia on Rotoehu by Pikiao's friend Matarewha. Meanwhile, Tūtānekai moved from Mokoia to Te Whetengu pā in the Tihi-o-tonga hills.

=== Conflict with Tuhourangi ===
Tūtānekai and his people went to visit his Tuhourangi cousins at Tumoana pā on Lake Rotoiti. During some friendly sparring, Tūtānekai's son Tamakuri was accidentally killed. Tūtānekai and his people fled. Meanwhile, the Tuhourangi people took Tamakuri's body to Omawhiti, where they ate it. Tūtānekai went seeking allies in getting revenge for this. He was refused by the Ngāti Awa at Te Awa-o-te-Atua and by the Waitaha at Otamarakau (because they were relatives of Tamakari and Morewhati, whom Tūtānekai had killed previously). Finally, he decided to seek help from his former enemies, Ngāti Pikiao. He went to their pā at Te Puia, walked right in and sat down between Pikiao and his son Te Takinga. One of the warriors of Ngāti Pikiao, Matarewha, raised his club to kill Tūtānekai but decided not to strike him because he was so close to Pikiao and Te Takinga. Tūtānekai managed to make peace with Tūtānekai and convinced them to join him in his attack on Tuhourangi. They brought the local members of Waitaha into the expedition as well. Tūtānekai then returned home.

The expedition, which was led by Te Takinga and Matarewha of Ngāti Pikiao, went from Waitangi hot springs, along Te Komutunga ridge to Tumoana. There, they tricked the Tuhourangi into sallying forth, ambushed them at the battle of Harakekengunguru, and captured Tumoana. The war party then travelled to Pareteiro and lit a fire to call Tūtānekai to come with canoes to collect the victorious warriors. When they reached Mokoia, they gave Tūtānekai the body of Whioi, the last Tuhourangi to be killed at Tumoana, as compensation for the death of Tamakuri. In return, Tūtānekai gave them a huge canoe called Whanaupukupuku.

=== Death ===
Tūtānekai died at Weriweri and was buried there. A lament composed for him by Hinemoa is still sung for his descendants:

Te tau, e; te tau a te rau, ka wehe i a au, e,
Aha i wehe ai? ka uru kei roto, te niho o Mokoroa,
Tangi ana, te wheoro, ki te tuakiri,
He whana taua nei, te wa o te mamae,
Tikina mai au, whakawairekatia,
Kia hoki ake ai, te korou ki te ao; e,
Ekore hoki ake, he ngaki mate pea, e.
Keria mai au, ki te ruagaeroa, e,
A ngaro ai ra, te wairua.

Translation:

== Family ==
Tūtānekai and Hinemoa had two children, both born at Kaiweka:

- Whatumairangi, who married his cousin Parehina, daughter of Tuteati:

- Taiwere, who married Tāmiuru, and died fighting Ngāi Te Rangi in the Kawa swamp:

- Pūkaki.

- Moekaha, who died fighting Ngāi Te Rangi in a second battle in the Kawa swamp:
- Ariariterangi.
- Hapeterarau

- Tamakuri, who was killed at Tumoana pā.

== Bibliography ==
- Grey, Sir George (1865). "The Story of Hinemoa and Tutanekai". Polynesian Mythology – via National Library of New Zealand.
- Grace, John Te Herekiekie (1959). Tuwharetoa: The history of the Maori people of the Taupo District. Auckland [N.Z.]: A.H. & A.W. Reed.
- Stafford, D.M. (1967). Te Arawa: A History of the Arawa People. Rotorua, New Zealand: A.H. & A.W. Reed.
