= Gustav Pauli =

German art historian and museum director

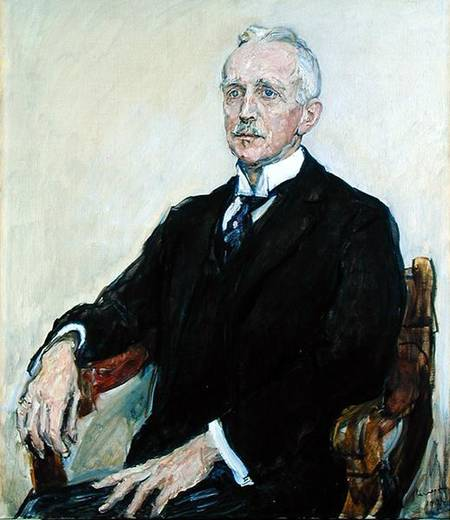
Portrait of Gustav Pauli by Max Slevogt.

Theodor Gustav Pauli (usually Gustav Pauli) (2 February 1866, Bremen – 8 July 1938, Munich) was a German art historian and museum director in Bremen and Hamburg.

== Early life and career ==
Gustav Pauli was the son of Bremen city senator and mayor, Alfred Pauli (1827–1915). He studied art history in Strasbourg, and then in Leipzig under Anton Heinrich Springer. Pauli wrote his thesis on the Renaissance in Bremen and graduated in Leipzig in 1889. He worked as a research assistant in the Kupferstichkabinett, Dresden alongside Max Lehrs from 1889 until 1891. When Springer died in 1891, Pauli applied to study under Jacob Burckhardt in Basel. Burckhardt, upon discovering that Pauli had spent time with the prickly Springer, declared that Springer's former students were "unteachable", but accepted him anyway.

== Bremen ==
In the summer of 1899, Pauli was appointed to the Kunsthalle Bremen. He engaged the gallery with modern German art, including the first monographic (and sadly, posthumous) exhibition of work by Paula Modersohn-Becker in 1908. He also collected a large number of German and French Impressionist works, which today form the core of the Kunsthalle's collection. In 1911, his purchase of Vincent van Gogh's Poppy Field caused a protest, led by Carl Vinnen, a German painter from Worpswede. Pauli's preference for modern works was seen by some, such as the painter, poet and critic Arthur Fitger, as both dissolute and irrelevant. Like his contemporary gallerist Hugo von Tschudi, Pauli collected works of modern painting at a time when it was deeply unattractive to the broader public, and unappreciated by many art critics.

== Hamburg ==
In 1914, Pauli succeeded Alfred Lichtwark as director of the Kunsthalle Hamburg. At Hamburg, he oversaw the opening of the "new building" in 1919, and used the additional display space afforded by the enlarged gallery to reorganise the hanging of the collection into a chronological format. He also opened a Print Room in the Kunsthalle in 1922, reflecting an interest first sparked in Dresden.

Pauli acquired more modern works, following Lichtwark's lead, including Édouard Manet's Nana of 1877. Pauli spoke at the funeral of his friend, the great "image historian" Aby Warburg, in 1929.

A fire in the Glass Palace in Munich in 1931 destroyed many important works which had been borrowed from the Kunsthalle Hamburg collection. A Festschrift was given to Pauli in that year. In 1933, Pauli signed his name to the Vow of allegiance of the Professors of the German Universities and High-Schools to Adolf Hitler and the National Socialistic State. Despite this, with the early stages of the Nazi attack on modern art and Pauli's public friendships with leading Jewish intellectuals, including Erwin Panofsky, he rapidly fell out of favour and was dismissed. His successor, Harald Busch, continued to defend the collection of modern art in the Kunsthalle.

== Life post-1933 ==
The Carl Schurz Society sponsored Pauli on a lecture tour of the United States in 1935. His autobiography, Erinnerungen aus sieben Jahrzehnten, was published in 1936. On 19 July 1937, the Degenerate Art Exhibition opened in Munich, which encouraged the public denigration of modern art. The important collections of modern art that Pauli had spent years building and defending in Bremen and Hamburg were dismantled. Pauli died in Munich on 8 July 1938.

== Major works ==
- Gainsborough, Künstlermonographie. Bielefeld & Leipzig: Verlag von Velhagen & Klasing, 1904.
- Venedig. 3rd edition, Leipzig: Verlag E. U. Seemann, 1906.
- (as editor) Philipp Otto Runge. Bilder und Bekenntnisse. Berlin: Furche-Verlag, 1918.
- Die Kunst und die Revolution. Berlin: Verlag Bruno Cassirer, 1921.
- Die Hamburger Meister der guten alten Zeit. Munich: Hyperion Verlag, 1925.
- Die Kunst des Klassizismus und der Romantik. Berlin: Propyläen Verlag, 1925.
- Paula Modersohn-Becker. Berlin: Kurt Wolff Verlag, 1934.
- Erinnerungen aus sieben Jahrzehnten. Tübingen: Wunderlich Verlag, 1936.
