= Otamarakau =

New Zealand beach and community

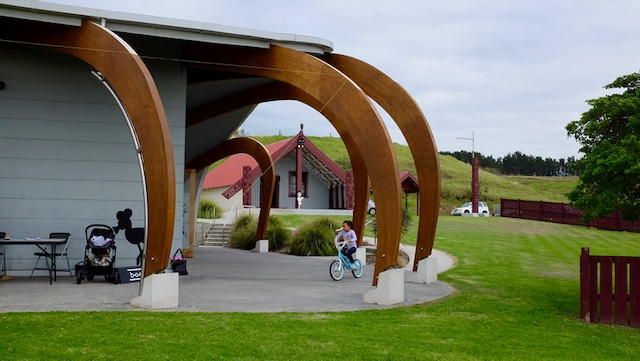
- A modern wharekai overlooks the traditional wharenui at the Ōtamarākau marae.
- Interactive map of Otamarakau
- Coordinates: 37.835°S 176.608°E
- Country: New Zealand
- Region: Bay of Plenty
- Territorial authority: Western Bay of Plenty
- Ward: Maketu-Te Puke Ward
- Established: pre-European
- Electorates: East Cape; Waiariki (Māori)

Government
  - Territorial authority: Western Bay of Plenty District Council
  - Regional council: Bay of Plenty Regional Council
  - Mayor of Western Bay of Plenty: James Denyer
  - East Cape MP: Dana Kirkpatrick
  - Waiariki MP: Rawiri Waititi

Area
  - Total: 19.64 km^{2} (7.58 sq mi)
- Elevation: 27 m (89 ft)

Population (2023 Census)
  - Total: 159
  - Density: 8.10/km^{2} (21.0/sq mi)
- Time zone: UTC+12 (NZST)
  - Summer (DST): UTC+13 (NZDT)
- Postcode: 3186
- Area code: 07

Otamarakau (Māori: Ōtamarākau) is a beach and community in the Western Bay of Plenty District and Bay of Plenty Region of New Zealand's North Island, just south of Pukehina.

The New Zealand Ministry for Culture and Heritage gives a translation of "place of young warriors" for Ōtamarākau.

In 2018, stormwater laden with sediment flowed over the Otamarakau wetlands from two ponds constructed without sufficient planning approval. In January 2020, kiwifruit company Bay Gold was fined over the incident.

A speed camera was installed on the highway through Otamarakau in 2018, leading to $30,000 of fines in its first month of operation.

== Marae ==
Ōtamarākau Marae and its Waitahanui a Hei meeting house are a traditional meeting place for the people of Ngāti Mākino. The modern waterfront wharekai designed by Aladina Harunani has accommodation and a full commercial kitchen. They host corporate meetings, Annual General Meetings, Special General Meetings, Wananga, family reunions, noho marae, weddings, birthdays, camps, schools and more for local, national and international visitors.

== Demographics ==
Otamarakau covers 19.64 km^{2} (7.58 sq mi). It is part of the larger Pongakawa statistical area.

Historical population
Year	Pop.	±% p.a.
2006	147	—
2013	147	+0.00%
2018	156	+1.20%
2023	159	+0.38%

Otamarakau had a population of 159 in the 2023 New Zealand census, an increase of 3 people (1.9%) since the 2018 census, and an increase of 12 people (8.2%) since the 2013 census. There were 87 males and 75 females in 48 dwellings. 1.9% of people identified as LGBTIQ+. The median age was 37.9 years (compared with 38.1 years nationally). There were 42 people (26.4%) aged under 15 years, 15 (9.4%) aged 15 to 29, 81 (50.9%) aged 30 to 64, and 21 (13.2%) aged 65 or older.

People could identify as more than one ethnicity. The results were 79.2% European (Pākehā), 34.0% Māori, 3.8% Pasifika, 5.7% Asian, and 3.8% other, which includes people giving their ethnicity as "New Zealander". English was spoken by 100.0%, Māori by 7.5%, and other languages by 3.8%. No language could be spoken by 1.9% (e.g. too young to talk). The percentage of people born overseas was 7.5, compared with 28.8% nationally.

Religious affiliations were 30.2% Christian, 5.7% Māori religious beliefs, and 3.8% other religions. People who answered that they had no religion were 56.6%, and 3.8% of people did not answer the census question.

Of those at least 15 years old, 21 (17.9%) people had a bachelor's or higher degree, 69 (59.0%) had a post-high school certificate or diploma, and 24 (20.5%) people exclusively held high school qualifications. The median income was $49,600, compared with $41,500 nationally. 21 people (17.9%) earned over $100,000 compared to 12.1% nationally. The employment status of those at least 15 was 72 (61.5%) full-time and 12 (10.3%) part-time.

== Education ==
Otāmarākau School is a co-educational state primary school for year 1 to 8 students, with a roll of 63 as of July 2026. It opened in 1916.

The school's main annual fundraising event is a surf fishing competition.
