= Ngāti Rangiwewehi =

Māori iwi (tribe) in Aotearoa New Zealand

- Iwi (tribe) in Māoridom

Ngāti Rangiwewehi is a New Zealand Māori iwi (tribe) of the Te Arawa confederation.

A Ngāti Rangiwewehi kapa haka group was founded in 1968 and has published their own songs and participated in various music festivals such as Te Matatini. The tribe is a two-time contest winner. They won their first contest in 1983 and their last one was in 1996.

Te Arawa FM is the radio station of Te Arawa iwi. It was established in the early 1980s and became a charitable entity in November 1990. The station underwent a major transformation in 1993, becoming Whanau FM. One of the station's frequencies was taken over by Mai FM in 1998; the other became Pumanawa FM before later reverting to Te Arawa FM. It is available on 89.0 FM in Rotorua.
