= Arawa (canoe) =

Māori migration canoe

- Great Māori migration waka
- Commander: Hei, Tia and Tama-te-kapua
- Priest: Hei, Tia and Ngātoro-i-rangi
- Landed at: Tauranganui, Whangaparaoa, Maketu
- Settled at: From Tauranga and Maketu to Tongariro

Arawa was one of the great ocean-going, voyaging canoes in Māori traditions that was used in the migrations that settled New Zealand. The Te Arawa confederation of Māori iwi and hapū based around the Rotorua Lakes and Bay of Plenty, as well as Ngāti Tūwharetoa, which is based around Lake Taupō, trace their ancestry from the people of this canoe.

== Background ==
Te Arawa's ancestors on board the Arawa were of the Ngāti Ohomairangi of Ra'iātea Island. Following a battle that broke out between them and Uenuku, in which their own Whakatūria fell in battle, Tama-te-kapua promised to captain the voyage to the islands of New Zealand, which had been discovered by Ngāhue of the Tāwhirirangi canoe.

== Construction of the canoe ==
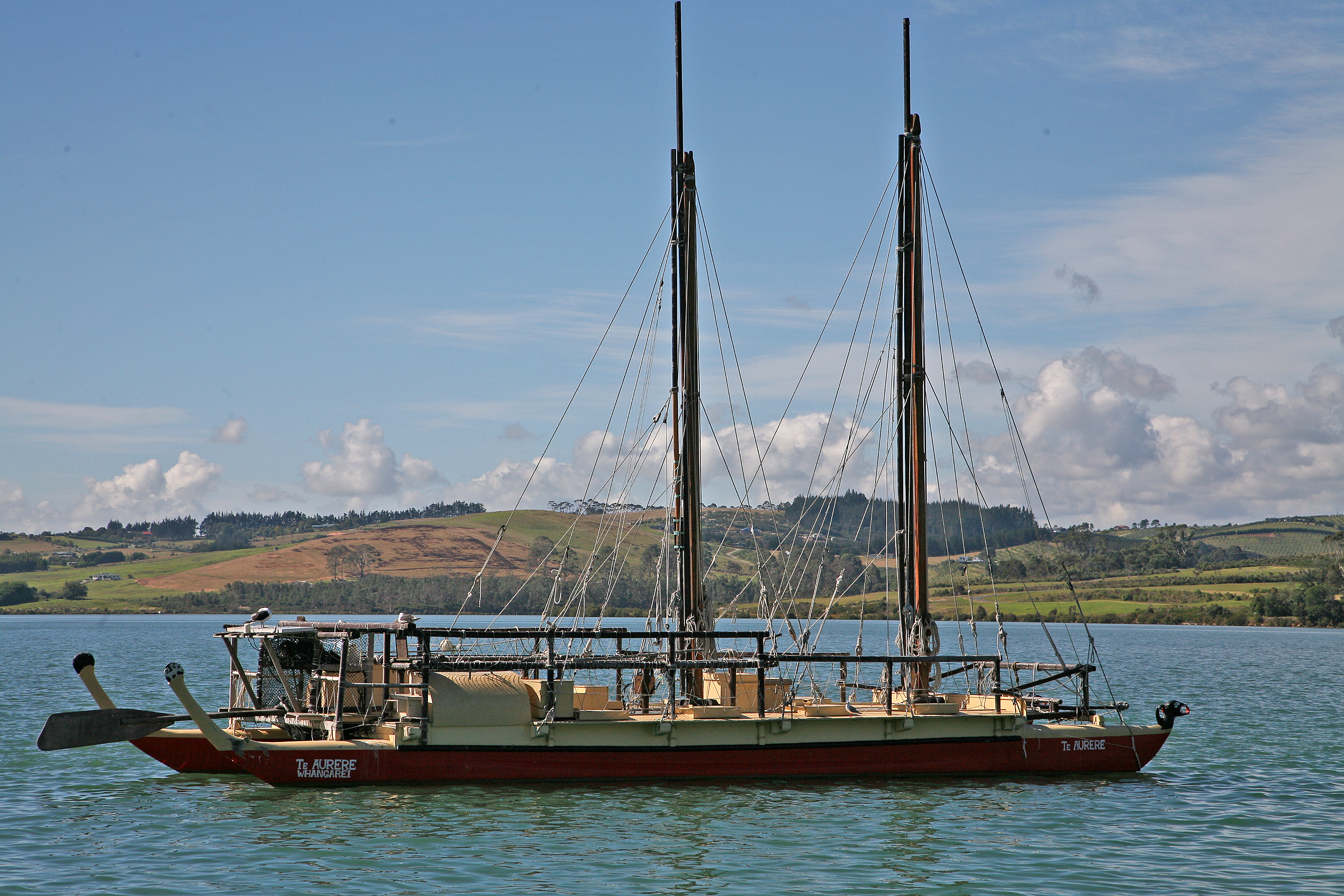
Te Aurere, a modern reconstruction of a sea-going waka (canoe).

A large tree was cut down by four men called Rata, Wahieroa, Ngāhue and Parata, to make the waka which came to be known as Arawa. "Hauhau-te-rangi" and "Tūtauru" (made from New Zealand greenstone brought back by Ngāhue) were the adzes used for the time-consuming and intensive work. D. M. Stafford records the karakia (invocation) sung when the tree was chopped down, which opens Kakariki powhaitere. Another canoe, Tainui, was made at the same place and time. Upon completion, the waka was given the name Ngā rākau kotahi puu a Atua Matua (also known as Ngā rākau maatahi puu a Atua Matua, or more simply Ngā rākau rua a Atuamatua - the two trunks of Atuamatua) in memory of Tama-te-kapua's grandfather Atua-matua. The song sung as it was hauled into the sea, toia Te Arawa tapotu ki te moana is recorded by several sources.

== Description and crew ==
The traditional accounts do not provide much clear information about the design and size of the Arawa. Most scholars have argued that it was a catamaran with two hulls, but some sources make it a single-hulled canoe. A drawing by Wi Maihi te Rangikaheke shows it with a single hull and a figurehead consisting of a horizontal plank with three vertical planks projecting out of it, decorated with feathers. Some accounts indicate that it had a large house on the deck. Another claims that it had three masts.

The crew consisted of both men and women, with estimates of their number ranging from around thirty to over a hundred. D. M. Stafford compiles a list of forty-nine men, who appear on the Arawa in different traditions, noting that some of them are otherwise attested on other canoes or seem implausible on genealogical grounds:

- Tama-te-kapua, the captain and ancestor of Te Arawa
- Ngātoro-i-rangi, the tohunga (priest and navigator) and ancestor of Ngāti Tūwharetoa
- Kahumatamomoe, son of Tama-te-kapua
- Tuhoromatakaka, son of Tama-te-kapua
- Īhenga, son of Tuhoromatakaka
- Hei, uncle of Tama-te-kapua
- Waitaha, son of Hei and ancestor of the Waitaha iwi
- Tutauaroa, son of Waitaha
- Pou, grandson or great-grandson of Hei
- Tia, an ancestor of Ngāti Tūwharetoa
- Tapuika, son of Tia and ancestor of the Tapuika iwi
- Hatupatu
- Ika
- Marupunganui, son of Ika
- Tuarotorua, son of Marupunganui
- Kawatutu
- Haukapuanui
- Kurapoto
- Mapara
- Oro, uncle of Tama-te-kapua
- Māka, son of Oro
- Whaoa, great-grandson of Māka
- Rongomai
- Tahu
- Taikehu
- Taininihi, who threw his feather head-dress overboard when the canoe made landfall.
- Tangihia
- Taunga
- Uruika
- Hopo
- Hurikoko
- Kawatea
- Kawauri
- Kuraroa
- Te Kuri-niho-popo
- Mawate or Mawete
- Naki
- Paeko
- Penu
- Rongokako
- Rongomaiwhaia
- Rongopuruao
- Ruarangi
- Ruarangimuria
- Tama-te-ranui
- Tama-te-rawhakarapa
- Tangihararu
- Tarawhata
- Uea

The following women are attested on the Arawa in different traditions:

- Kearoa, wife of Ngātoro-i-rangi
- Whakaotirangi, wife of Ruaeo, who was abducted by Tama-te-kapua
- Uenuku-whakarorongarangi, wife of Tuhoromatakaka

Items brought to New Zealand on the Arawa included a tapu kōhatu (sacred stone). There was also a magic whetstone for sharpening axes called Hine-tua-hōanga, which Īhenga, later installed at a sacred spring called Waiorotoki ("waters of the echoing axes") on the Waitetī stream near Ngongotahā. The stone was shown to James Cowan still in situ in 1930 and was said to have made the stream so tapu that it was fatal to drink from it. In addition, the canoe brought over two gods, one called Itupaoa, which was represented by a roll of tapa, and another stone carving buried at Mokoia Island on Lake Rotorua, which is perhaps to be identified with Matuatonga.

It had two stone anchors, called Toka-parore and Tu-te-rangi-haruru, now the name of two rocks in the Maketu estuary. A stone anchor in the churchyard at Ohinemutu is said to have come from the Arawa, but this is probably a 19th century waka of the same name.

== Voyage to Aotearoa ==
The waka was completed and berthed in Whenuakura Bay while Tama-te-kapua, chief of the canoe, attempted to find a priest for the journey. Ngātoro-i-rangi and his wife Kearoa were tricked by Tama-te-kapua into boarding the canoe to perform the necessary appeasement incantations to the gods before the canoe departed. However, while they were on board, Tama-te-kapua signalled to his men to quickly set sail, and before Ngātoro-i-rangi and his wife could react they were far out to sea.

During the voyage to New Zealand, Tama-te-kapua became desirous of Kearoa. Ngātoro-i-rangi noticed this and guarded his wife during the night while he was on deck navigating, by tying one end of a cord to her hair and holding the other end in his hand. However, Tama-te-kapua untied the cord from Kearoa's hair and attached it to the bed in order to have sex with her, repeating this over a number of nights. One night he was nearly caught in the act by Ngātoro-i-rangi, but managed to escape, though forgetting the cord in his haste. Ngātoro-i-rangi found the cord and deduced that Tama-te-kapua had been with Kearoa. In revenge, he raised a huge whirlpool in the sea named Te korokoro-o-te-Parata ('The throat of Te Parata'). The waka was about to be lost with all on board, before Ngātoro-i-rangi took mercy and calmed the seas.

During these events, all the kūmara on board the canoe were lost overboard, except a few in a small kete being held by Whakaotirangi. After the calming of the seas, a shark (known as an arawa) was seen in the water. Ngātoro-i-rangi renamed the waka Te Arawa, after this shark, which then accompanied the waka to Aotearoa, acting as a kai-tiaki (guardian).

=== Arrival ===
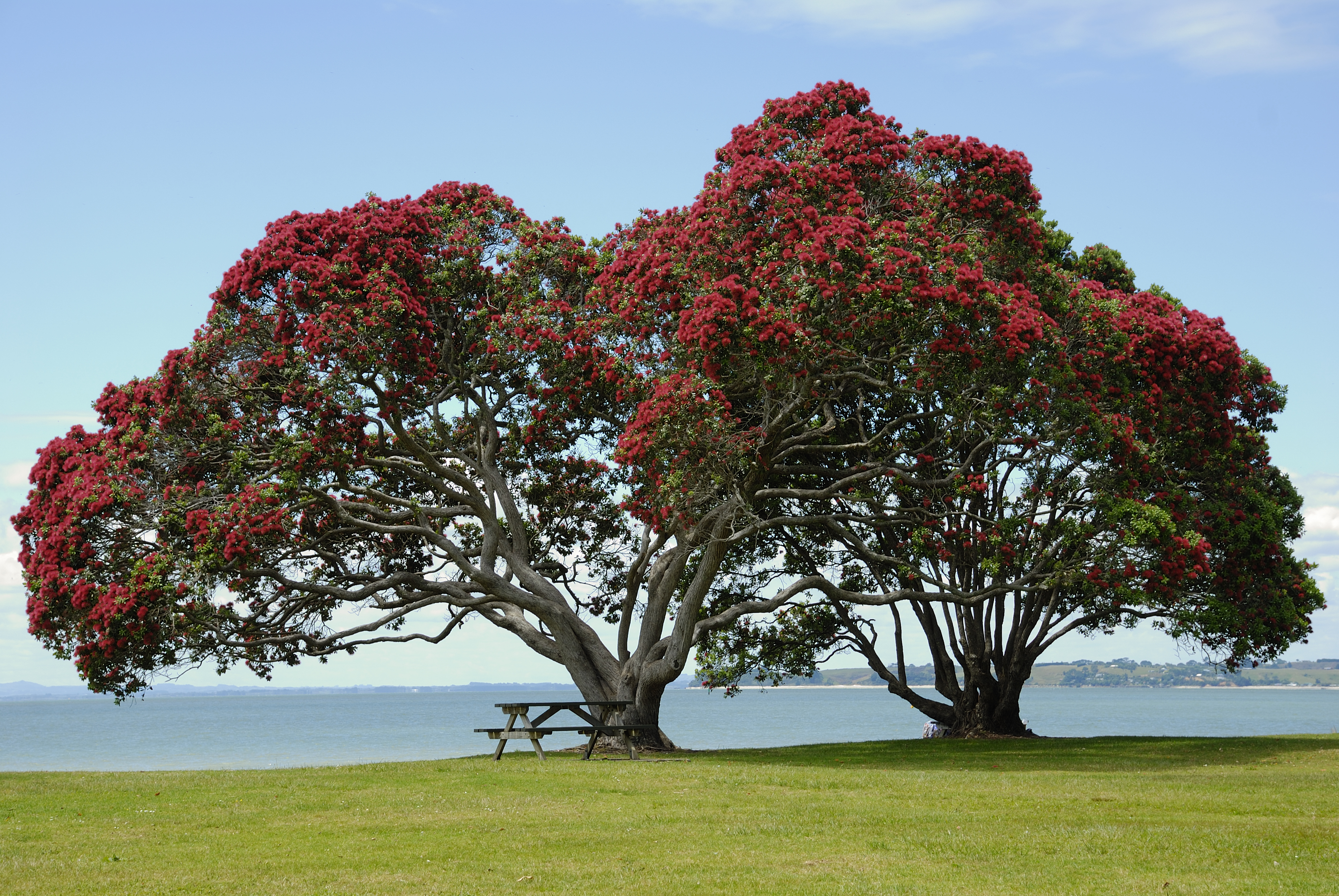
Pōhutukawa trees in flower

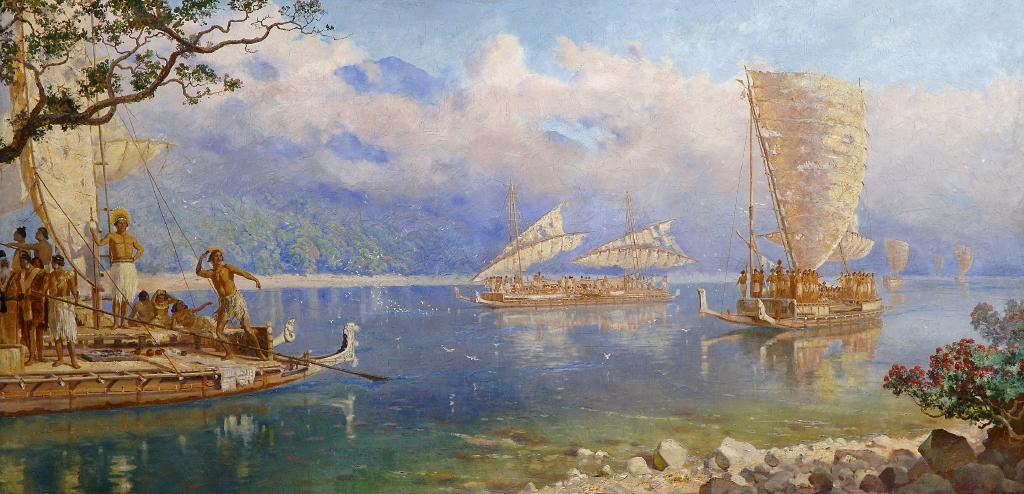
Kennett Watkin's 1912 painting, The Legend of the Voyage to New Zealand, depicts the landfall of migratory canoes, including the Arawa, at Whangaparāoa

The Arawa canoe continued on to New Zealand, finally sighting land at Whangaparaoa near Cape Runaway in Te Moana-a-Toi (the Bay of Plenty). When the crew saw the bright red flowers of the pōhutukawa as they came in to land, they threw away their red-feather head-dresses, thinking that they could use the flowers instead. The feathers were found on the beach by Māhina, who refused to return them.

After they had landed, the crew discovered that the Tainui canoe had already landed nearby. They also found a beached sperm whale. Tama-te-kapua built a tuahu altar out of weathered materials and tied the canoe to the jaw of the whale, covering the rope with sand, as if it had been covered up by the tide. He pointed these things out to the crew of Tainui and convinced them that Arawa had actually arrived first. This incident is the subject of much dispute between Arawa and Tainui, who tell a similar story, but with the roles reversed.

On arrival, Tahu-whakatiki and Waitaha, the two sons of Hei, argued. Tahu-whakatiki therefore left the Arawa and eventually settled at Whangārei.

=== Moehau and Maketu ===
Places visited by Arawa in the Bay of Plenty
1 Whangaparāoa
2 Whakaari (White Island)
3 Mount Moehau
4 Reponga
5 Maketu

The canoe then travelled north up the coast, past Whakaari (White Island), to the Coromandel Peninsula, where Tama-te-kapua first sighted the mountain Mount Moehau and laid claim to it as his home and final resting place. At the island Te Poito o te Kupenga a Taramainuku just off the coast, Ngātoro-i-rangi deposited the tapu kōhatu (sacred stone), holding the mauri to protect the Arawa peoples and their descendants from evil. Heading south again, the Arawa landed at Reponga island, where the crew left two magic birds, called Mumuhou and Takareto, to let voyagers know when the sea would be rough or calm. They continued until Tama-te-kapua caught sight of the Maketu peninsula, which he staked a claim to, declaring it to be "the bridge of my nose." Other members of the crew began claiming the land: Tia declared the area northwest of Maketu to be the belly of his son Tapuika and Hei called the next hill north of that the belly of his son Waitaha. They brought the Arawa up the Kaituna River at Maketu, tying the bow to a rock called Tokaparore and the stern with an anchor called Tuterangiharuru. Both rocks are features of the landscape today. This landfall took place in December. The spot is commemorated by the centennial monument, erected at Maketu in 1940.

After landfall, Ruaeo arrived on a separate canoe, Pukateawainui, took revenge on Tama-te-kapua, and led a group consisting of Tuarotorua, Marupunganui, Taunga, and Kawatutu inland towards Lake Rotorua. Tia led another party on a westerly route towards Lake Taupō, while Ngātoro-i-rangi went past Lake Tarawera and on to Taupō as well. Ika and Kahumatamomoe travelled down the western route to Taupō and Ika continued to Whanganui with Oro. Hei and Waitaha settled the area between Katikati and Te Puke, but Waitaha also occupied Ōtamarākau. Tapuika settled the area between Te Puke and Maketu. Tama-te-kapua and his son Kahumatamomoe settled at Maketu itself. Uruika settled the area between Ōtamarākau and Matatā.

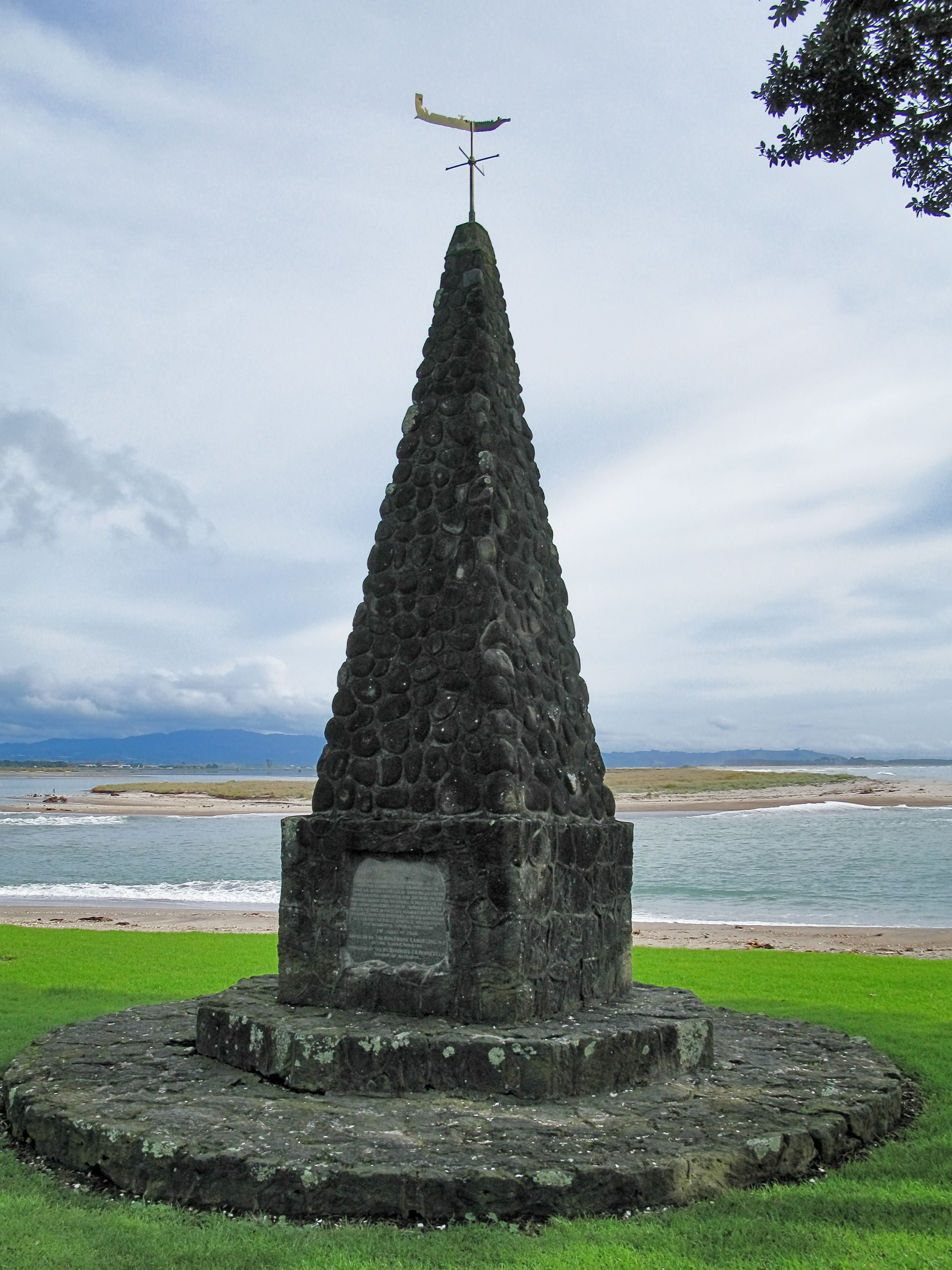
Centennial monument, Maketu.

== Destruction ==
The Arawa was beached at Maketu, where it was placed under a protective shed and venerated as a highly tapu relic. Later, Raumati of Taranaki visited the area, while the people were away and burnt the canoe. It is unclear whether they did this intentionally or accidentally. This act of destruction was avenged by Hatupatu, who killed Raumati and brought his head to Mokoia Island on Lake Rotorua.

The tribe that travelled on the Arawa was originally called Ngāti Ohomairangi, but the people assumed the name Arawa in honour of their canoe, when Ngātoro-i-rangi led them back to Hawaiki to defeat Manaia. Today the descendants of the crew say that the bow piece of Arawa is Maketu and the stern-piece is Mount Tongariro, a metaphorical description of the territory they occupy.

== See also ==
- List of Māori waka

== Bibliography ==
- Best, E. (1982). Maori Religion and Mythology Part 2. Museum of Australia Te Papa Tongarewa.
- Craig, R.D. Dictionary of Polynesian Mythology (Greenwood Press: New York, 1989), 24.
- Grace, John Te Herekiekie (2010) [1959]. Tuwharetoa: The history of the Maori people of the Taupo District. Auckland [N.Z.]: A.H. & A.W. Reed. ISBN 9780589003739.
- Grey, G. Polynesian Mythology, Illustrated edition, reprinted 1976. (Whitcombe and Tombs: Christchurch), 1956.
- Jones, P.T.H. (1995). Nga Iwi o Tainui. Auckland University Press. Auckland.
- Jones, Pei Te Hurinui; Biggs, Bruce (2004). Ngā iwi o Tainui : nga koorero tuku iho a nga tuupuna = The traditional history of the Tainui people. Auckland [N.Z.]: Auckland University Press. ISBN 1869403312.
- Stafford, D.M. (1967). Te Arawa: A History of the Arawa People. Rotorua, New Zealand: A.H. & A.W. Reed..
- Steedman, J.A.W. He Toto: Te Ahu Matua a Nga Tupuna.
- Taiapa, J. (2002). 150.114 He Tirohanga o Mua: Maori Culture - Study Guide. School of Maori Studies, Massey University, Albany.
- Wilson, J. (Ed). (1990). He Korero Purakau mo Nga Taunahanahatanga a Nga Tupuna: Place Names of the Ancestors: A Maori Oral History Atlas. N.Z. Geographic Board, Wellington.
