= Mokoia Island =

Island in Lake Rotorua, New Zealand

Coordinates: 38°4′52.52″S 176°17′3.89″E

Mokoia
Native name: Te Motu-tapu-a-Tinirau
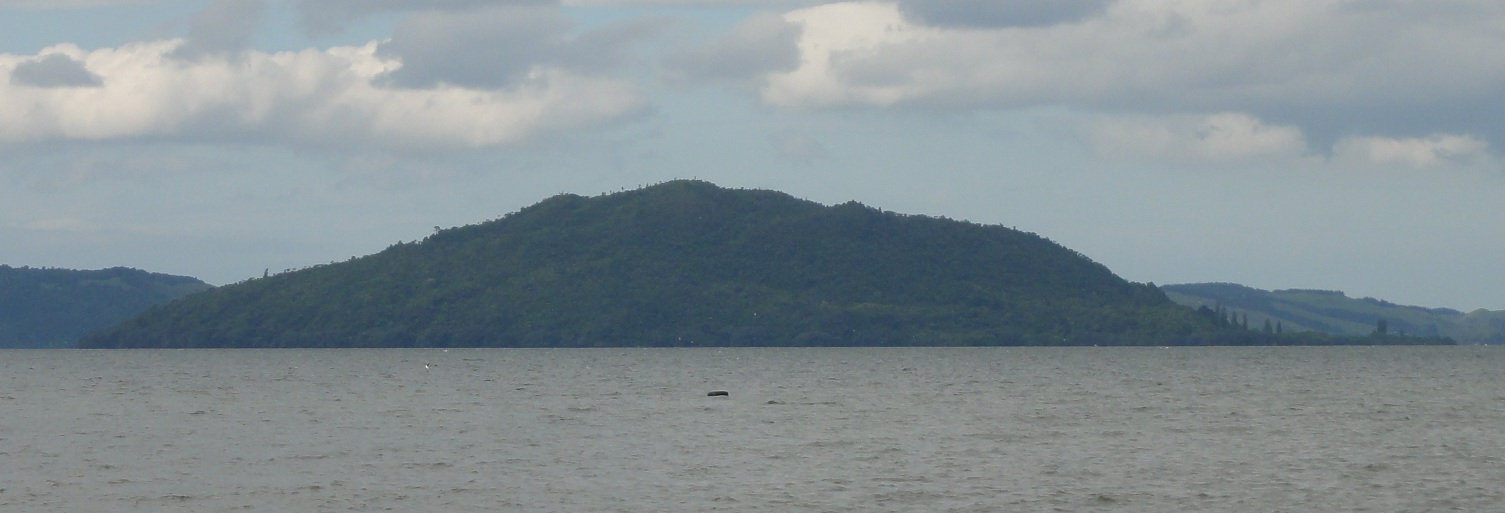
- Mokoia Island as seen from Rotorua

Geography
- Location: Lake Rotorua
- Area: 1.35 km^{2} (0.52 sq mi)

Administration
- New Zealand

Demographics
- Population: 0

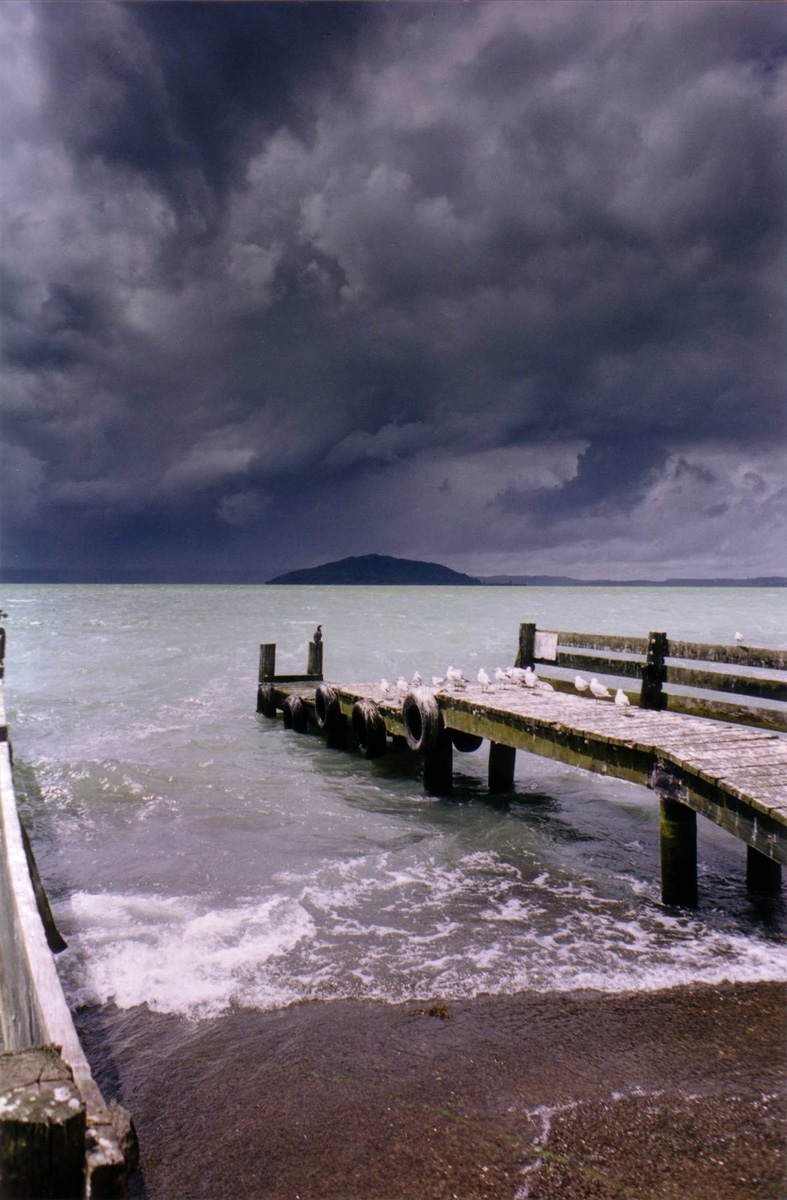
Mokoia under stormy skies, seen from the south

Mokoia Island is located in Lake Rotorua in New Zealand. It has an area of 1.35 square kilometres. The uninhabited island is a rhyolite lava dome, rising to 180 metres above the lake surface. It was formed after the Rotorua caldera collapsed and rhyolitic magma was pushed through the cracks. One of the cracks was below where Mokoia island is today. The foreshores of the island have geothermal springs with hot spring water forming the Hinemoa pool, known to locals as Waikimihia. It also has very rich volcanic soil, which was why the local Māori grew kūmara on it. The stone statue of Matuatonga on the island protected the island's kūmara crop, and tohunga would bring seed kūmara to touch the statue. It was also a very good strategic location, which was why it was often fought over.

Mokoia Island is privately owned by local Māori iwi, who run it in conjunction with the New Zealand Department of Conservation. It is a bird sanctuary and access is limited to tour parties only. It is home to several rare species, including the North Island kōkako, the North Island brown kiwi, and a breeding population of the endangered North Island saddleback.

The island is also the location of regular Mau rākau training camps in the Māori martial art of taiaha.

== Hinemoa and Tūtānekai ==
The island is sacred to Māori of the Te Arawa iwi, and is the location of one of the most famous legends of New Zealand, that of Hinemoa and Tūtānekai, which has parallels with the classical Greek tale of Hero and Leander.

According to legend, the two lovers were forbidden to marry, and Hinemoa's father Umukaria, a chief from the shores of the lake, ordered that she not be allowed to travel by canoe to Tūtānekai's tribal village on the island. Hinemoa decided to swim 3.2 kilometres across the lake to the island, guided by the sound of Tūtānekai's flute-playing. For flotation she wrapped rushes (a type of reed) around her and swam her way to the island. According to another version, she made a flotation device from gourds.

The island is the setting of the Te Arawa version of the widely known traditional Māori love song "Pōkarekare Ana", which references the story of Hinemoa and Tūtānekai. The lyrics imply Hinemoa's crossing the lake to reach Tūtānekai.

== See also ==
- Pokarekare Ana
- List of volcanoes in New Zealand
- List of islands
- Desert island
