= Curtis Island (New Zealand) =

Island in New Zealand

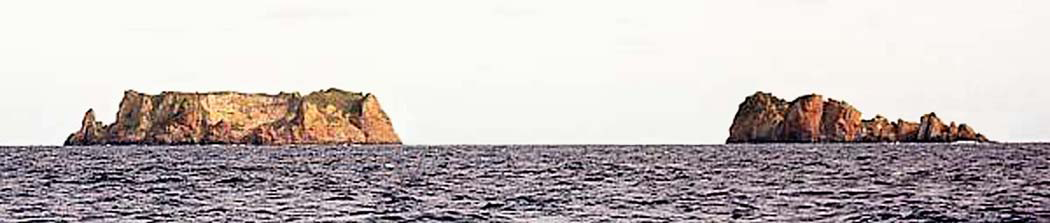
- Curtis Island (left) and Cheeseman Island from north

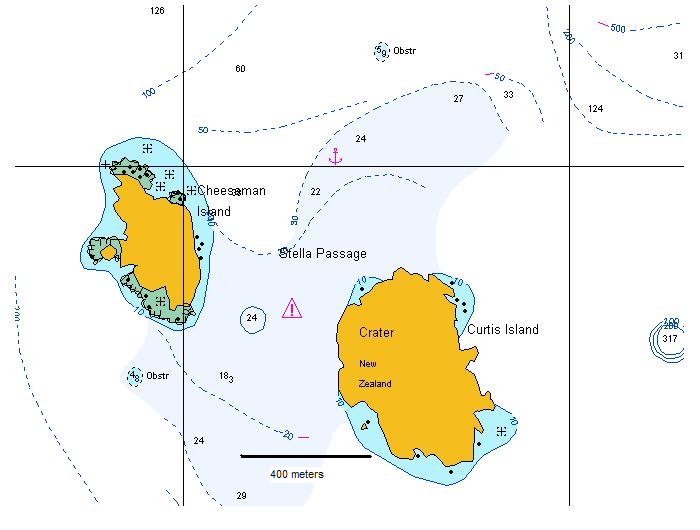
- Map

Geography
- Coordinates: 30°32′28″S 178°33′27″W
- Archipelago: Kermadec Islands
- Highest elevation: 47 m (154 ft)

Administration
- New Zealand

Demographics
- Population: Uninhabited

Curtis Island is an island in the southwest Pacific. It is a volcanic island which, together with neighbouring Cheeseman Island, belongs to the Kermadec Islands, an outlying island group of New Zealand. It is a volcanic island with a fumarolically active crater, while vegetated slopes are nested by seabirds. There are uncertain reports of eruptions and the island has been uplifted by about 18 m (59 ft) during the past 200 years.

== History ==
Lieutenant John Watts, RN was the first European to visit the Macauley and Curtis Islands – which he named after patrons George Mackenzie Macaulay and William Curtis – on the Lady Penrhyn on 1 July 1788. In 1888 castaway depots were established on both Curtis and Cheeseman islands, for the use of shipwrecked crews.

Count von Luckner, commander of the German raider Seeadler during the First World War, stopped off at Curtis Island in 1917 to replenish his stores from the castaway depot while attempting to make good his escape from New Zealand to South America.

== Geography and geomorphology ==
Curtis Island lies in the Kermadec Islands, between Tonga in the north and New Zealand in the south. The four other islands are Raoul Island and Macauley Island 35 km (22 mi) north of Curtis, Cheeseman Island next to Curtis and L'Esperance 83 km (52 mi) to its south. Cheeseman Island lies west-northwest from Curtis and is separated from the latter by the less than 1 km (0.62 mi) wide Stella Passage.

The island has a surface area of 42–52 ha (0.42–0.52 km^{2}). Cliffs surround a central plateau at about 100 m (330 ft) elevation and on the northeastern side continue below sea level. There are no known beaches. Two gaps in the cliffs are The Chasm to the southeast and former Macdonald Cove to the northwest. The island lies at the western side of a 6.5 km (4.0 mi) wide shoal at less than 250 m (820 ft) depth on the Kermadec Ridge. Bouldery reefs occur at 25 m (82 ft) depth. The total volume of the volcano, including its submarine sector, is about 41 km^{3} (9.8 cu mi), and it features a 7 by 6 kilometres (4.3 mi × 3.7 mi) wide caldera. The deepest point of the caldera is 400 metres (1,300 ft) below sea level.

At the centre of the island, slightly offset to the northwest, lies a 120–140 m (400–450 ft) deep, elliptical, maximally 200 m (660 ft) wide volcanic crater with a surface area of 31,000 m^{2} (330,000 sq ft) at 10 m (33 ft) above sea level. North-south trending fractures in the island appear to have influenced the formation and shape of the crater. There is a breach on the northern side and a warm stream drains the crater into the sea northwest of the island. A second crater is found on the southeastern side of the island. This highest elevation is 47 m (154 ft).

== Geology ==
The 2,550 km (1,580 mi) long Tonga-Kermadec arc extends from New Zealand's North Island to Tonga and lies between the Havre Trough to the west and the Kermadec Trench to the east. It occurs where the Pacific Plate subducts beneath the Australian Plate in the Kermadec Trench giving rise to magmas from depleted mantle with minor quantities of melted sediments that drive volcanism. Generally, the geology of the Kermadec arc is poorly known, as most of it is submerged. The emergent parts form the Kermadec Islands.

The Havre Trough is a backarc basin where crustal spreading takes place; it is the southern continuation of the Lau basin where seafloor spreading is underway and the entire system formed due to a southwestward movement of the Kermadec arc. Of the volcanoes in the Kermadec arc, Raoul Island has had historical eruptions and active submarine volcanoes have been discovered.

=== Composition ===
Most of the island is formed by pyroclastic rocks, which in some places are intruded by dykes. The pyroclastic rocks are mainly tuff-like, with embedded pumice and rock fragments and only weak bedding. Volcanic rocks from Curtis Island include andesite with plagioclase and pyroxene phenocrysts. Dacites have also been reported, while there are no reported mafic rocks.

Hydrothermal deposits such as silica and sulfur occur in the crater. Hydrothermal alteration by hydrothermal waters and the condensation of sulfuric acid has yielded aluminite, alunite, anhydrite, chlorite, cristobalite, diaspore, gibbsite, hematite, kaolinite, metahalloysite, natroalunite, pyrite, quartz and smectite, with chlorite, diaspore, natroalunite and sulfur being the most common.

== Biology ==
Like the other Kermadec islands, Curtis Island is a nature reserve administered by the New Zealand Department of Conservation. Ice plant, herbs, grasses and sedges grow on the island, with species including Asplenium obtusatum, Cyperus ustulatus, Disphyma australe, Lachnagrostis littoralis, Parietaria debilis, Solanum nigrum and Sonchus kirkii although the crater floor is mostly bare. Boobies, grey ternlets and petrels nest on the island, which has been greatly impacted by their presence; the island's soil is heavily burrowed from their nests. Other birds reported from Curtis Island are blackbirds, starlings and song thrushes, while there are no known mammals; goats liberated on the island in 1887 did not survive. Sea life is related to tropical and subtropical animals.

== Eruption history ==
Curtis Island is believed to be a remnant of a pyroclastic flow sheet or of an andesitic volcano that once included Cheeseman Island, before erosion and sea level changes gave the islands their present shape. A ship sailing close to Curtis Island in 1936 reported discoloured water in the area, although its position is not known with certainty. Earthquakes and earthquake swarms recorded around Curtis Island in January and February 2009 may indicate ongoing magma movement underground. Reports of an eruption in 1869, 1870 or 1899 appear to be incorrect, a December 1936 eruption is uncertain and some reports of eruptions may instead reflect increases in fumarolic activity. Earthquakes at Curtis in 2009 and 2017 caused tsunamis; they may be due to collapses in the caldera.

=== Uplift ===
Numerous lines of evidence such as a shallowing of the surrounding sea and the emergence of previously submarine rock features such as barnacles and wave-cut notches indicate that during the 20th century, the island has risen at a rate of 12 cm/year (4.7 in/year). The total uplift between 1929 and 1964 reached 7 m (23 ft) and 18 m (59 ft) during the past 200 years. Since Curtis and Cheeseman are located in the middle of the caldera, they might be resurgent domes that are actively uplifting.

There appear to have been two distinct uplift episodes with a stillstand from 1908 or earlier to 1929, and there is evidence for such uplift also at L'Esperance farther south. Prior to the uplift, Macdonald Cove could be used as a boat landing at least until 1929; presently Macdonald Cove is dry.

=== Hydrothermal activity ===
Fumaroles, hot springs and bubbling mud pools occur on the crater floor, with fumarolic gas emissions also recorded elsewhere on the island. Some pools have temperatures reaching 100 °C (212 °F). Activity was already noted in the 19th century and was rather intense during various landings but appears to have declined during the 20th century.

The hydrothermal waters are sulfatic, presumably from the oxidation of hydrogen sulfide, and mainly heated by steam. They contain aluminum and iron derived from the leaching of rock. The water appears to originate from the condensation of steam derived from rain and from magma.

A second, submarine hydrothermal field is the Vulkanolog field 19 km (12 mi) south of Curtis Island. It was discovered in 1979 by the R/V Vulkanolog and named after it, but its activity appears to have ceased and it cannot be definitively correlated with Curtis Island.

== See also ==
- List of volcanoes in New Zealand
- List of islands of New Zealand
- List of islands
- Desert island
