= Kermadec Islands =

Subtropical island arc in the South Pacific Ocean

Rangitāhua
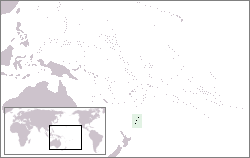
- Location (in green rectangle) in the Pacific Ocean

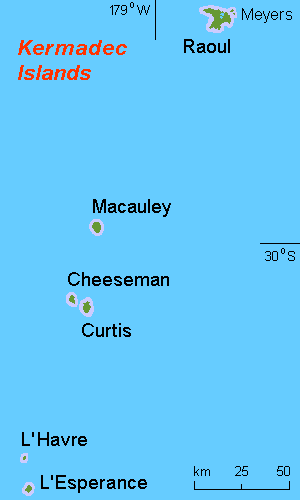

Geography
- Coordinates: 29°16′37″S 177°55′24″W
- Total islands: around 16
- Area: 33.6 km^{2} (13.0 sq mi)
- Highest elevation: 516 m (1693 ft)

Administration
- New Zealand

Demographics
- Population: 0 (2006)

The Kermadec Islands (/ˈkɜːrmədɛk/ KUR-mə-dek; Māori: Rangitāhua) are a subtropical island arc in the South Pacific Ocean 800–1,000 km (500–620 mi; 430–540 nmi) northeast of New Zealand's North Island, and a similar distance southwest of Tonga. The islands are part of New Zealand. They are 33.6 km^{2} (13.0 sq mi) in total area and uninhabited, except for the permanently staffed Raoul Island Station, the northernmost outpost of New Zealand.

The islands are listed with the New Zealand outlying islands. The islands are an immediate part of New Zealand, but not part of any region or district, but instead an Area Outside Territorial Authority.

== Toponymy ==
The islands were named after the Breton captain Jean-Michel Huon de Kermadec, who visited the islands as part of the d'Entrecasteaux expedition in the 1790s. The topographic particle "Kermadec" is of Breton origin and is a lieu-dit in Pencran in Finistère where ker means village, residence and madec a proper name derived from mad (which means 'good') with the suffix -ec, used to form adjectives indicating a property.

The Māori name is Rangitāhua which is also used for Raoul Island.

== History ==
As indicated by their name for the islands, Rangitāhua (lit. 'the stopping-off place'), Polynesian people "stopped off" on the Kermadec Islands in around the 14th century (and perhaps previously in the 10th century). Their arrival is also evident in the presence of introduced taro and candlenut growing wild in certain areas of Raoul Island supported by its relatively warm climate. However, the first Europeans to reach the area – arriving on board the Lady Penrhyn in May 1788 – found no inhabitants on these volcanic islands.

British, American and Australian whaling vessels cruised offshore in the 19th century and often visited the islands in search of water, wood and food. The first such vessel on record was the whaler Fanny that visited Raoul Island in 1823.

On 1 August 1886, HMS Diamond annexed the islands for the United Kingdom. Letters patent issued on 18 January 1887, assigned the islands to the colony of New Zealand following a request from the colony's parliament. European settlers have lived on the island for varying lengths of time, from the early nineteenth century until 1937, growing food for the whalers. The Thomas Bell family settled on the island from 1878 to 1914. One of the Bell daughters, Bessie Dyke, recounted the family's experience to writer Elsie K. Morton who published their story in 1957 as Crusoes of Sunday Island.

=== Raoul Island Station ===
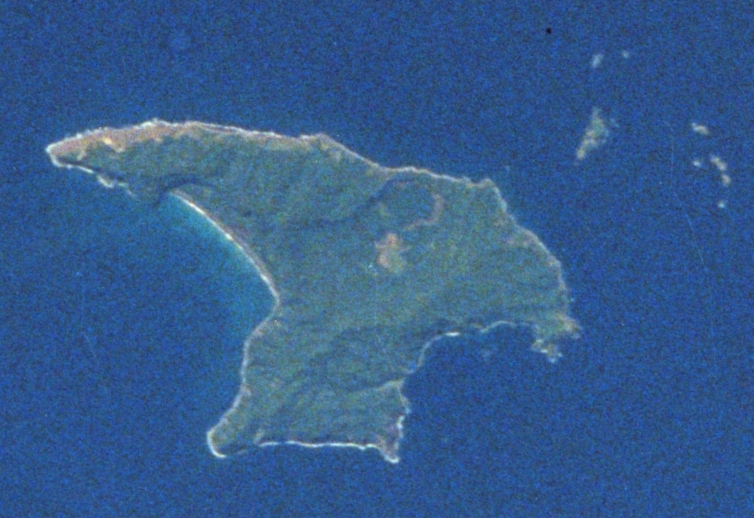
Raoul Island from space

The Raoul Island Station consists of a government meteorological and radio station, and a hostel for Department of Conservation officers and volunteers, that has been maintained since 1937. It lies on the northern terraces of Raoul Island, at an elevation of about 50 m (160 ft), above the cliffs of Fleetwood Bluff. It is the northernmost inhabited outpost of New Zealand.

=== Nuclear testing proposals ===
In 1955, the British Government required a large site remote from population centres to test the new thermonuclear devices it was developing. Various islands in the South Pacific and Southern Oceans were considered, along with Antarctica. In May 1955, the Minister for Defence, Selwyn Lloyd, on advice from the Admiralty report, concluded that the Kermadec Islands would be suitable. As the island group was part of New Zealand, Anthony Eden, who had recently become the Prime Minister of the United Kingdom, wrote to the Prime Minister of New Zealand, Sidney Holland, to ask for permission to use the islands. Holland refused, fearing an adverse public reaction in the upcoming 1957 general election. Despite reassurances and pressure from the British government, Holland remained firm.

== Geography ==
The islands lie within 29° to 31.5° south latitude and 178° to 179° west longitude, 800–1,000 km (500–620 mi; 430–540 nmi) northeast of New Zealand's North Island, and a similar distance southwest of Tonga. The total area of the islands is 33.6 km^{2} (12.97 sq mi).

=== Climate ===
The climate of the islands is subtropical, with a mean monthly temperature of 22.4 °C (72.3 °F) in February and 16.0 °C (60.8 °F) in August. Rainfall is approximately 1,500 mm (60 in) annually, with lower rainfall from October to January.

=== Islands ===
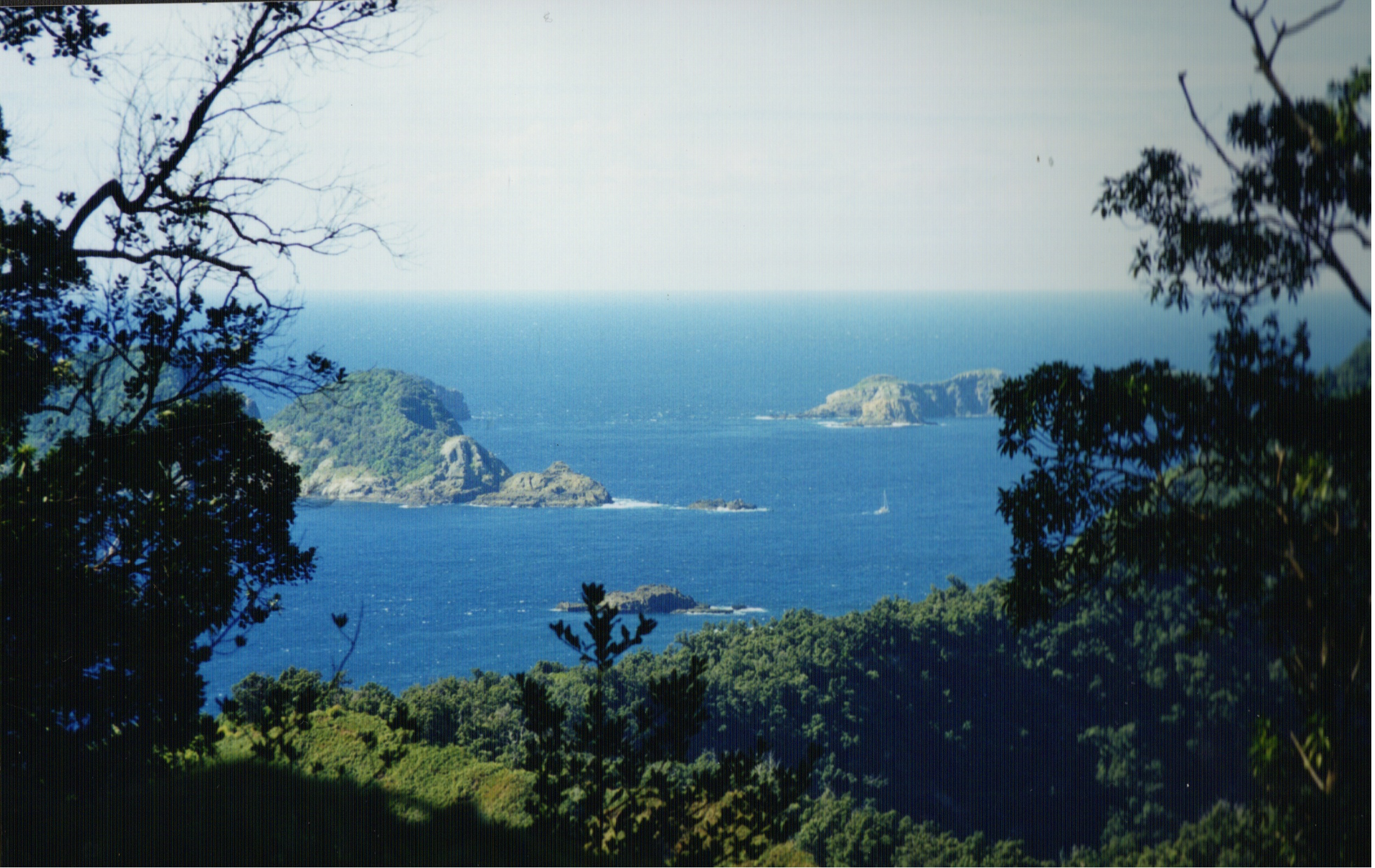
View from Raoul Island

The group includes four main islands as well as some isolated rocks. These are:

- Raoul Island or Sunday Island is by far the largest of the islands. It lies 900 km (560 mi; 490 nmi) south-southwest of 'Ata, the southernmost island of Tonga, and 1,100 km (680 mi; 590 nmi) north-northeast of New Zealand. Raoul Island has an area of 29.38 km^{2} (11.34 sq mi) with numerous smaller satellite islands; its highest point, Moumoukai Peak, is 516 m (1,693 ft) high.
- Macauley Island, the second largest, is located 110 km (68 mi; 59 nmi) south-southwest of Raoul Island. Together with neighbouring Haszard Island, its area is 3.06 km^{2} (1.18 sq mi).
  - Macdonald Rock is about 4 km (2.5 mi; 2.2 nmi) north of Macauley Island.
- Curtis Island, the third largest, lies 35 km (22 mi; 19 nmi) south-southwest of Macauley Island. It reaches a height of 137 m (449 ft) and has an area of 0.59 km^{2} (0.23 sq mi) with neighbouring Cheeseman Island.
- Nugent Island is the northernmost island. It is approximately 100 metres (109 yd) across.
- L'Esperance Rock, formerly French Rock, is 80 km (50 mi; 43 nmi) south-southwest of Curtis Island. It is 250 m (820 ft) in diameter, 0.05 km^{2} (0.019 sq mi) in area, and 70 m (230 ft) high.
- L'Havre Rock, about 8 km (5.0 mi; 4.3 nmi) north-northwest of L'Esperance Rock, is submerged except at low tide.

Seamounts north and south of the Kermadec Islands are an extension of the ridge running from Tonga to New Zealand (see Geology). Star of Bengal Bank, 103 km (64 mi) south-southwest of L'Esperance Rock, has a least depth of 48 metres (157 ft).

=== Geology ===
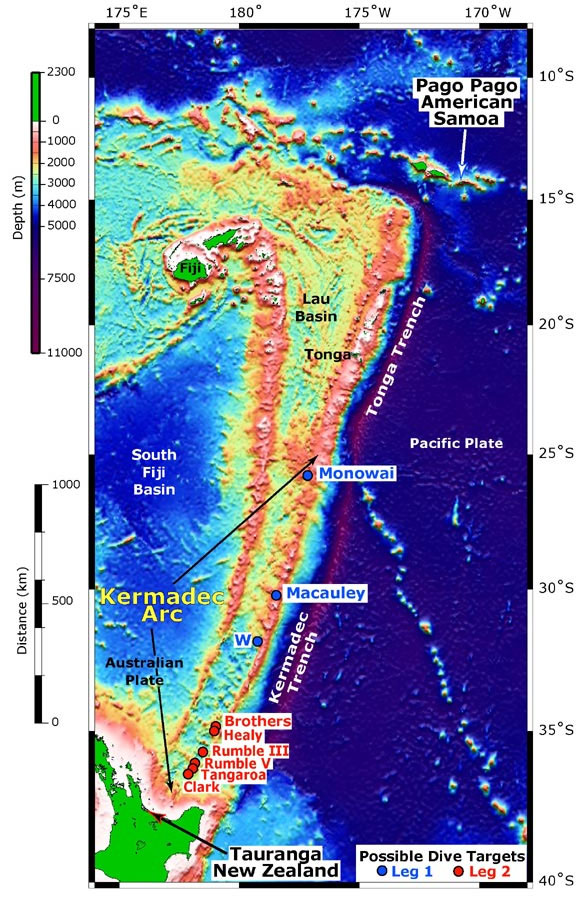
Bathymetry of the Kermadec volcanic island arc and surrounding areas

The islands are a volcanic island arc, formed at the convergent boundary where the Pacific plate subducts under the Indo-Australian plate. The subducting Pacific plate created the Kermadec Trench, an 8 km deep submarine trench, to the east of the islands. The islands lie along the undersea Kermadec Ridge, which runs southwest from the islands towards the North Island of New Zealand and northeast towards Tonga (Kermadec-Tonga Arc).

The four main islands are the peaks of volcanoes that rise high enough from the seabed to project above sea level. There are several other volcanoes in the chain that do not reach sea level, but form seamounts with between 65 and 1500 m of water above their peaks. Monowai Seamount, with a depth of 120 m over its peak, is midway between Raoul Island and Tonga. 100 km south of L'Esperance Rock is the little-explored Star of Bengal Bank, probably with submarine volcanoes.

Further south are the South Kermadec Ridge Seamounts, the southernmost of which, Rumble IV Seamount, is just 150 km North of the North Island of New Zealand. The ridge eventually connects to White Island in New Zealand's Bay of Plenty, at the northern end of the Taupō Volcanic Zone. The islands experience many earthquakes from plate movement and volcanism.

Raoul and Curtis are both active volcanoes. The volcanoes on the other islands are currently inactive, and the smaller islands are the eroded remnants of extinct volcanoes.

From 18 to 21 July 2012, Havre Seamount (near Havre Rock) erupted, breaching the ocean surface from a depth of more than 1100 m and producing a large raft of pumice floating northwest of the volcano. The eruption was not directly observed, but it was located using earthquake and remote sensing data after the pumice raft was spotted by aircraft and encountered by HMNZS Canterbury.

The islands are seismically active. An 8.1 magnitude earthquake occurred in the early hours of 5 March 2021, leading to several strong aftershocks and a tsunami advisory on the North Coast of North Island and other Pacific islands, including Norfolk Island, Australia. Other magnitude 8 earthquakes have struck near the islands in 1917 and 1976.

== Environment ==
=== Flora ===
The islands are recognised by the World Wildlife Fund as a distinct ecoregion, the Kermadec Islands subtropical moist forests. It is a tropical and subtropical moist broadleaf forests ecoregion, part of the Oceanian realm. The forests are dominated by the red-flowering Kermadec pōhutukawa, related to the pōhutukawa of New Zealand. The islands are home to 113 native species of vascular plants, of which 23 are endemic, along with mosses (52 native species), lichens and fungi (89 native species). Most of the plant species are derived from New Zealand, with others having travelled over the Pacific. 152 human-introduced species of plants have become established on the islands.

Dense subtropical forests cover most of Raoul, and formerly covered Macauley. Metrosideros kermadecensis is the dominant forest tree, forming a 10 – 15-metre (30 – 50-foot) high canopy. A native nīkau palm (Rhopalostylis baueri) is another important canopy tree. The forests have an understory of smaller trees, shrubs, ferns, and herbs, including Myrsine kermadecensis; Lobelia anceps, Poa polyphylla, Coprosma acutifolia, and Coriaria arborea. Two endemic tree ferns, Alsophila milnei and the rare and endangered Alsophila kermadecensis, are also found in the forests.

Areas near the seashore and exposed to salt spray are covered by a distinct community of shrubs and ferns, notably Myoporum obscurum, Coprosma petiolata, Asplenium obtusatum, Cyperus ustulatus, Disphyma australe, and Ficinia nodosa.

=== Fauna ===
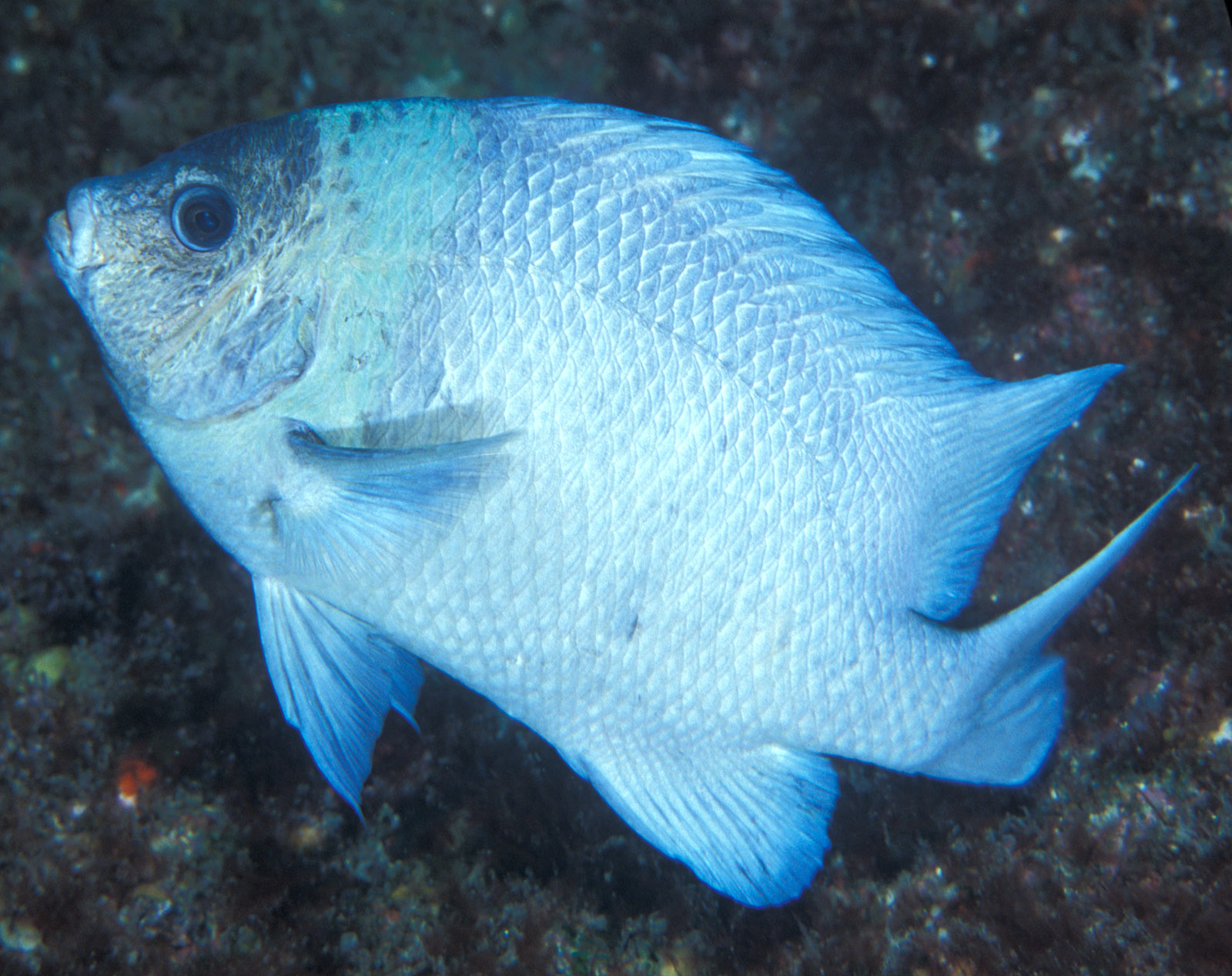
The Kermadec scalyfin – part of the rich marine biota of the Kermadecs

The islands have no native land mammals. An endemic bird subspecies is the Kermadec red-crowned parakeet. The group has been identified as an Important Bird Area (IBA) by BirdLife International because of its significance as a breeding site for several species of seabirds, including white-necked and black-winged petrels, wedge-tailed and little shearwaters, sooty terns and blue noddies. The area also hosts rich habitats for cetaceans. In recent years, increased presences of humpback whales indicate Kermadec Islands functioning as migratory corridors, and varieties of baleen (not in great numbers) and toothed whales including minke whales, sperm whales, less known beaked whales, killer whales, and dolphins frequent in adjacent waters. In late September 2015, satellite tags were attached to 25 humpback whales around Raoul Island, which were tracked to feeding grounds in Antarctica and across to the Antarctic Peninsula. Vast numbers of southern right whales were historically seen in southwestern areas although only a handful of recent confirmations exist around Raoul Island. The deep sea hydrothermal vents along the Kermadec ridge support diverse extremophile communities including the New Zealand blind vent crab. Three new records of tropical reef fishes were recorded from the Kermadec Islands Marine Reserve in 2015 after researchers examined hundreds of hours of unused documentary film footage, and in 2016, a red velvet whalefish and an angler fish (Ceratias tentaculatus) were found around the waters of the Kermadec Islands by a research partnership between Ngāti Kurī, University of Auckland, Massey University, NIWA, Manaaki Whenua, and the University of Waikato. Raoul Island had a megapode population, though it died out in the late 19th century.

In 2016, Koha, a hawksbill turtle which was originally found injured near Dargaville in September 2014, was nursed back to health at Kelly Tarlton's Sea Life Aquarium and released around the waters of Raoul Island. The release was from the deck of the RV Tangaroa, with land in sight to enable Koha to orientate itself to prevent the risk of getting lost in the open ocean.

=== Conservation ===
The introduction of cats, rats, and goats devastated the forests and seabirds. Overgrazing by goats eliminated the forests of Macauley Island, leaving open grasslands, and altered the understory of Raoul Island. Predation by rats and cats reduced the seabird colonies on the main islands from millions of birds to tens of thousands. The New Zealand government has been working for the last few decades to restore the islands. New Zealand declared the islands a nature reserve in 1937, and the sea around them a marine reserve in 1990. The marine reserve surrounds each of the islands and is one of New Zealand's largest at a total area of 7,480 km^{2} (2,890 sq mi).

Goats were removed from Macauley in 1970 and from Raoul in 1984, and the forests have begun to recover. The islands are still known for their bird life, and seabird colonies presently inhabit offshore islets, which are safe from introduced rats and cats. Efforts are currently underway to remove the rats and cats from the islands, as well as some of the invasive exotic plants.

Visits to the islands are restricted by the Department of Conservation. The department allows visits to Raoul by volunteers assisting in environmental restoration or monitoring projects, and other visitors engaged in nature study. Visits to the other islands are generally restricted to those engaged in scientific study of the islands.

On 29 September 2015, the New Zealand Prime Minister John Key announced the creation of the Kermadec Ocean Sanctuary, a 620,000 km^{2} (239,383 sq mi) protected area in the Kermadec Islands region. However, subsequently, fishing companies and iwi bodies filed legal action opposing it, and a coalition deal with the New Zealand First Party has led to the Kermadec Ocean Sanctuary Bill not passing its second reading as of 2019. In late March 2024, the Government halted work on the Kermadec Ocean Sanctuary Bill.

In October–November 2016, a collaborative team of researchers from Auckland Museum, University of Auckland, Massey University, NIWA and Te Papa undertook research around Kermadec Islands aboard RV Tangaroa. The multi-disciplinary team investigated the biodiversity of organisms living on the ocean floor and at midwater. The marine mammal populations were examined to determine what animal and plant species are shared between mainland New Zealand and the Kermadec region.
