= Macauley Island =

Volcanic island in the Kermadec Islands

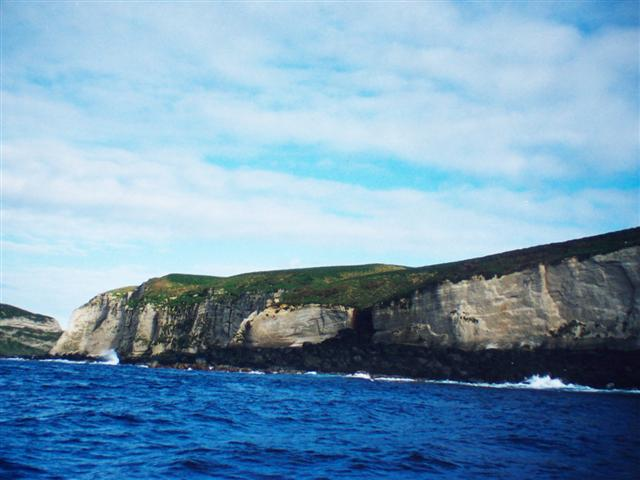
- View from the north-east, 1999

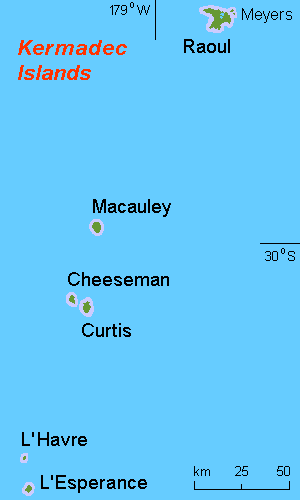
- Macauley Island in the Kermadec Islands

Geography
- Location: South Pacific Ocean
- Coordinates: 30°14′S 178°26′W
- Archipelago: Kermadec Islands
- Area: 3.06 km^{2} (1.18 sq mi)
- Length: 2.5 km (1.55 mi)
- Width: 1.8 km (1.12 mi)
- Highest elevation: 238 m (781 ft)
- Highest point: Mount Haszard

Administration
- New Zealand

Demographics
- Population: 0

Additional information
- Nature Reserve

Macauley Island is a volcanic island in New Zealand's Kermadec Islands, approximately halfway between North Island of New Zealand and Tonga, in the south-west Pacific Ocean. It is part of a larger submarine volcano that features a 10.5-by-7-kilometre (6.5 by 4.3 mi) wide underwater caldera (Note: A caldera is a circular depression produced usually by the collapse of a volcanic edifice after partial emptying of its magmatic system.) northwest of Macauley Island. Two islets, Haszard Island and Newcome Rock, lie east offshore of Macauley Island. The island is mostly surrounded by high cliffs that make it difficult to access; the inland parts are mostly gently sloping terrain covered with ferns and grasses.

The island formed during several volcanic episodes that produced mainly basaltic (Note: Basalt is a volcanic rock with a fine-grained texture, dark colours and a mafic composition.) rocks as lava flows. During the Holocene, a large explosive eruption produced the Sandy Bay Tephra; this eruption may have had a volume of more than 100 cubic kilometres (24 cu mi) and the Macauley caldera might have formed during that occasion. Later, most of the current surface of Macauley Island formed as the Haszard Formation. Two possible eruptions took place during the 19th century offshore Macauley Island; a hydrothermal vent system is active at Macauley Cone in the caldera.

Macauley Island is an important breeding place for many seabirds, which come on land only to reproduce. The island is uninhabited but Polynesians and, during the 19th century, whalers introduced goats, pigs and rats which damaged the island's ecosystem. During the 20th and 21st centuries these invasive species were largely eradicated, leading to a recovery of the previous vegetation. The island is part of several protected areas.

== History ==
Macauley Island was first seen by Westerners on 30 June 1788 aboard the Lady Penrhyn. It is likely that Polynesians visited the island during or after 1300 despite the lack of direct archaeological evidence other than a flake made out of obsidian discovered in 2015. They may have obtained obsidian from the island. The island was originally named Macaulay after George Mackenzie McCaulay, an alderman of the City of London who had contracted the voyage of the Lady Penrhyn. A castaway depot was established on the north-eastern side of Macauley Island in 1888.

Macauley Island and other Kermadec Islands have been part of New Zealand's territory since the 19th century. Early explorers envisaged planting trees on Macauley Island and using the Kermadec islands as places to settle from New Zealand. In 1957, the Kermadec Islands were briefly considered as a potential testing ground for the British nuclear weapons programme but were ruled out for logistical and political reasons. Archaeological excavations were conducted in 1990 on Macauley and Raoul Island.

== Geography and geomorphology ==
Macauley Island is in the Kermadec Islands, 109 kilometres (68 mi) south-south-west of Raoul Island and roughly halfway between Tonga and New Zealand. Cheeseman Island and Curtis Island lie south-south-west of Macauley Island, and Havre and L'Esperance Rock are even farther south; together these islands form the southern group of the Kermadec Islands, of which Macauley Island is the largest. Raoul is visible from Macauley Island when the weather is clear. Located within the exclusive economic zone (Note: A country has exclusive rights to the natural resources and to construct infrastructure, within its exclusive economic zone.) of New Zealand, the islands are since 1990 within the Kermadec Islands Marine Reserve and the Kermadec Benthic Protected Area administered by the New Zealand Department of Conservation. The islands are, with the exception of the weather station on Raoul Island, uninhabited.

The volcano rises from a depth of 1,700 metres (5,600 ft) where it is 23–30 kilometres (14–19 mi) wide; it is elongated in east-southeast direction and features a 10.5 by 7 kilometres (6.5 mi × 4.3 mi) wide submarine caldera northwest of Macauley Island. The caldera floor and rim are 1,100 metres (3,600 ft) and 600 metres (2,000 ft) below sea level, respectively. The caldera is elongated in east-north-east direction and features north-north-east trending lineaments that extend to Macauley Island. Jumbled blocks, presumably from landslides or slumps, cover the portions of the caldera adjacent to Macauley Island, and there is evidence of collapses on the western caldera margin. A fault (Note: A fault is a fracture that separates two rock units. It often features relative motion between the rocks.) runs inside the caldera next to its southeastern margin. The caldera floor is covered with pumice, and thick pumice deposits exist on the flanks of Macauley volcano.

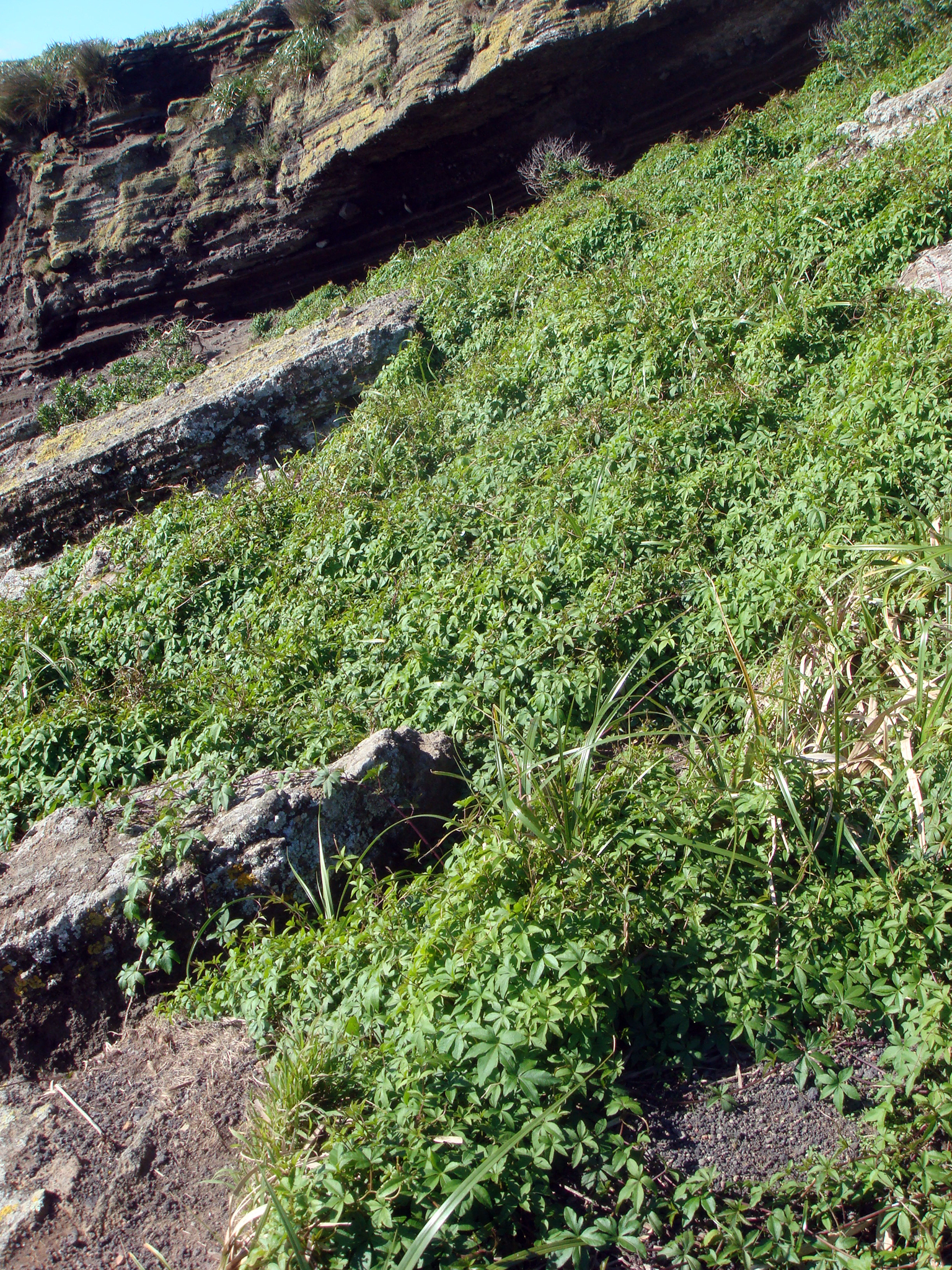
A vine (Ipomoea cairica) grows among other plants down scoriaceous talus slopes and tuff cliffs on the seaward side of the volcano crater.

North-northwest of the caldera is a 9-kilometre (5.6 mi) long structure called Lloyd dome or Curtis Ridge; it is surmounted by a lineament of cones that rise to 80 metres (260 ft) below sea level. 300-metre (980 ft) high and 700-metre (2,300 ft) wide Macauley Cone is located on the southeastern caldera margin and rises to 250 metres (820 ft) depth. It is capped by an 80-metre (260 ft) wide and 45-metre (148 ft) deep crater with a floor covered with ash and sulfur, and its slopes are covered with talus (Note: Talus is an accumulation of rock debris at the base of a slope or cliff.). Parasitic vents and structures have been identified on the caldera rim and submarine slopes of Macauley Island volcano during bathymetric analysis, some of which are the source of lava flows that extend into the caldera and down the flanks.

The seafloor on the slopes of Macauley volcano is covered with sand, rock, breccia (Note: A rock formed by angular fragments of other rocks.) and bacterial mats. "Sediment waves" up to 1 kilometre (0.62 mi) long and 100 metres (330 ft) wide occur on the submarine slopes and extend over 55 kilometres (34 mi) away from the volcano. These waves appear to have formed in part during sector collapses (Note: A sector collapse is the failure of a portion of a volcanic structure that generates a landslide.) and in part during density flows triggered by eruptions; the size of the latter waves may be indicative of the large size of eruptions. The submarine slopes are dissected by canyons and channels. The total volume of the volcano is about 269 cubic kilometres (65 cu mi), of which less than five per cent are above sea level.

=== Macauley Island ===
External image
- Bathymetric map of Macauley Island and Giggenbach

Parts of the volcano emerge above sea level, forming Macauley Island, Haszard Island and Newcombe Rock. Together they have an area of about 3 square kilometres (1.2 sq mi), making it the second-largest island in the Kermadec Islands. Macauley Island was also known as Green Island.

Macauley Island is about 2.1 kilometres (1.3 mi) wide with a roughly circular to rectangular shape and rises from an average elevation of about 100 metres (330 ft) to the 238-metre (781 ft) high Mount Haszard in the northern part of the island. Seen from the north the island has the shape of a wedge; it has a more rounded shape when seen from the east.

The island has a surface area of 3.06 square kilometres (306 ha). Most of the island is a gently tilted plateau, cut by gullies and ravines which are the only way to reach the inside of the island. The deepest of these gullies is the 45-metre (148 ft) deep Grand Canyon on the eastern side of Macauley Island; there is evidence that the gullies have become deeper in historical times. Flowing water occurs only after rainfall. The island is geologically unstable; beaches and landforms frequently shift owing to erosion during rainfall and tropical cyclones, but also due to earthquakes.

Cliffs with heights of over 61 metres (200 ft) surround most of Macauley Island and allow landing only at Sandy Bay, a 140-metre (150 yd) long beach. Boulder, gravel and sand beaches occur in some places; others have steep rocky slopes at subtidal depths with crevices, caves and overhangs. At its northwestern end west of Mount Haszard, the steep Perpendicular Cliff drops into the southern part of the caldera. The structure of the shield volcano with lava flows, tephra (Note: Tephra is fragmented volcanic rock ejected during volcanic activity, like volcanic ash.) and two volcanic craters crop out in the cliff. South and south-west of Mount Haszard are two more craters known as Haszard Crater and Macauley Crater.

Haszard Island lies 230 metres (250 yd) east of Macauley Island, next to Sandy Bay. Its name is derived from Henry Douglas Morpeth Haszard (at first, it was named Roaches' Isle) and, like that of Mount Haszard, is often spelled as Hazard. It has a surface of about 0.032 square kilometres (8 acres) and is entirely surrounded by cliffs, making access difficult. Newcombe Rock, also known as Haszardette, is located north-east of Haszard Island and may be part of the same edifice, separate from the Macauley Island one. Three more emergent rocks are found north-east and south-west of Haszard Island and south of Macauley Island, and a shallow rock named Mac Donald lies reportedly a few kilometres off Mount Haszard.

== Geology ==
In the south-west Pacific, the Pacific Plate subducts (Note: The tectonic process through which a part of Earth's crust sinks into the mantle at a plate boundary.) beneath the Australian Plate and a set of microplates in the 2,550-kilometre (1,580 mi) long and maximally 10,800-metre (35,400 ft) deep Kermadec Trench. This subduction has given rise to the Tonga-Kermadec volcanic arc, which is subdivided at 25.6° latitude (where the Louisville seamount chain subducts in the trench) into the Tonga arc to the north and the Kermadec arc to the south. In the Kermadec arc, subduction proceeds at a rate of 50–70 millimetres per year (2.0–2.8 in/year).

The Kermadec arc consists mainly of 33 mostly submarine volcanoes and calderas and extends from White Island next to New Zealand to Raoul Island. The volcanoes are formed principally by basaltic and andesitic magmas and are lined up in a 40-kilometre (25 mi) wide zone west of the trench. The volcanoes are located 15–25 kilometres (9.3–15.5 mi) west of the Kermadec Ridge, except for Macauley, Raoul and Curtis Islands which are on it, and rise on oceanic crust of Eocene age. Volcanism began in the Pliocene and has occurred at the present-day location of the Tonga-Kermadec Ridge for about one million years. Many of the volcanoes were discovered using bathymetry and about 80% show hydrothermal activity. Because of its mostly submarine location, volcanism in the Kermadec arc is poorly understood.

The Kermadec Islands are the emergent part of the Kermadec arc, most of which is more than 500 metres (1,600 ft) below sea level. The islands are usually found on ridges perpendicular to the main ridge, implying that local lineaments control the position of volcanoes; they are separated from each other by water depths of over 900 metres (3,000 ft). 24 kilometres (15 mi) west-northwest of Macauley Island lies Giggenbach, a submarine volcano, and even farther west are the Havre Trough and a caldera. This trough separates the Kermadec microplate from the Australian plate and it, along with the Lau Basin, began to form through crustal spreading 6 million years ago; the lineaments of the Macauley caldera appear to match those of the Havre Trough. The Kermadec–Havre system is considered to be an archetype of a backarc-volcanic arc system.

=== Composition ===
Most of the rocks on Macauley Island have a basaltic composition, which defines an alumina-rich to tholeiitic suite with intermediate potassium contents. The rocks contain olivine and pyroxene phenocrysts with rare glass, and the Sandy Bay Tephra contains augite, hypersthene, ilmenite, magnetite and plagioclase. There is a single instance of dacite and rhyolite in Sandy Bay Tephra, and evidence for earlier felsic eruptions; apart from that Macauley Island rocks have a largely uniform composition. Mixing of chemically distinct magma appears to have occurred before the eruption of the Sandy Bay Tephra.

Gabbro and basalts with different compositions occur as xenoliths and resemble similar rocks of Raoul Island. Chemical alteration has given rise to gypsum, hematite, kaolinite, montmorillonite, natroalunite and tridymite. The altered rocks have pink and red colours and there are occurrences of palagonite. Hyaloclastite is found in the sea at shallow depths and ferromanganese crusts have been dredged from the submarine flanks of Macauley Island.

The volcano is believed to consist mostly of basaltic rocks. The occurrence of felsic rocks at Macauley Island and elsewhere in the Tonga-Kermadec volcanic arc is unexpected. Processes where magma ascending into the lower crust heats it until it melts (anatexis) and dehydrates have been invoked to explain the felsic volcanism in the Kermadec arc. An origin through fractional crystallization of basaltic magmas is unlikely for several reasons. The backarc extension in the Havre Trough, where tectonic lineaments match the trend of the Macauley caldera and of Denham Caldera on Raoul Island, may also have influenced the explosive activity at both calderas.

== Climate and oceanic conditions ==
The climate of Macauley Island is presumed to resemble that of Raoul Island, where temperatures range 12–25 °C (54–77 °F) and about 1,500 millimetres (60 in) of precipitation falls each year. In summer, winds blow from east and southeast and the rest of the year from northwest. The island undergoes approximately 2,100 hours of sunlight per year.

The Kermadec Islands are largely exposed to oceanic swells coming from all directions. Ocean current regimes in this area of the Pacific Ocean are poorly known and appear to be seasonal, with northerly currents during summer and southeasterly ones the rest of the year. Sea surface temperatures at Raoul Island to the north range between 16–26 °C (61–79 °F) and these at L'Esperance Rock south between 14–26 °C (57–79 °F), thus they are considered too cold to be tropical. Waters are salty and clear.

== Ecosystem ==
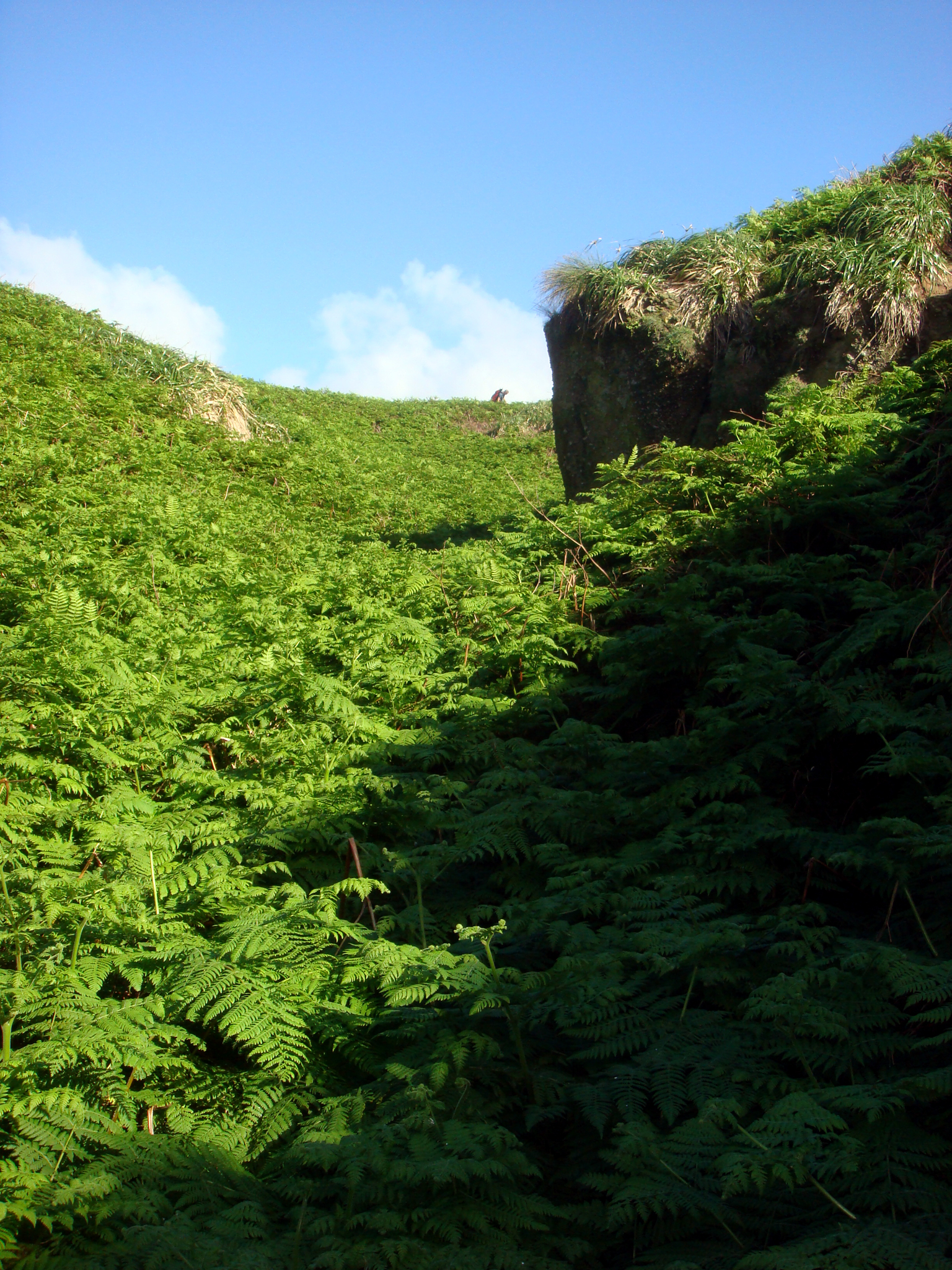
Small plants, such as ferns like Hypolepis dicksonioides, provide groundcover.

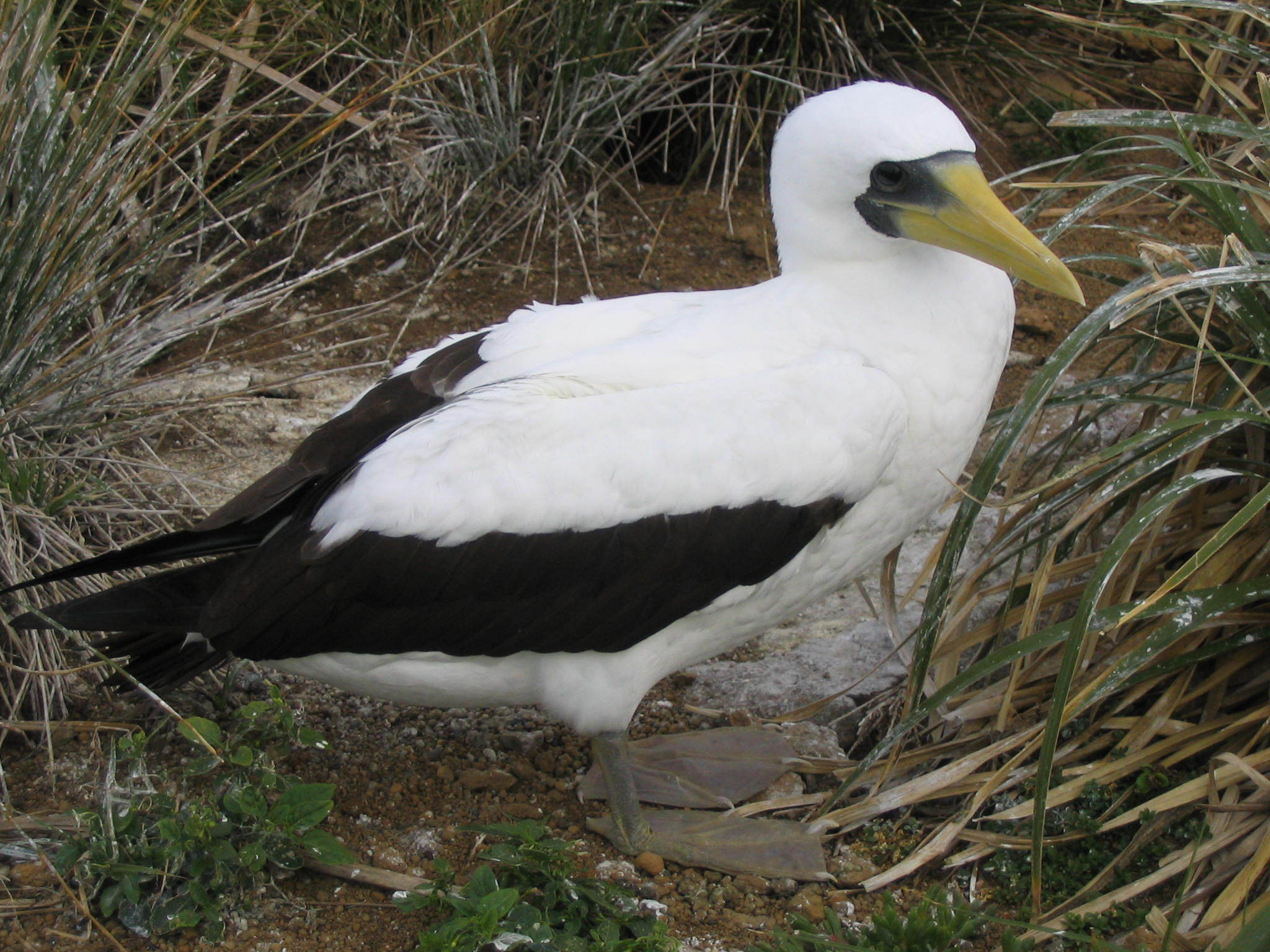
The Masked booby (Sula dactylatra tasmani) is present on the island.

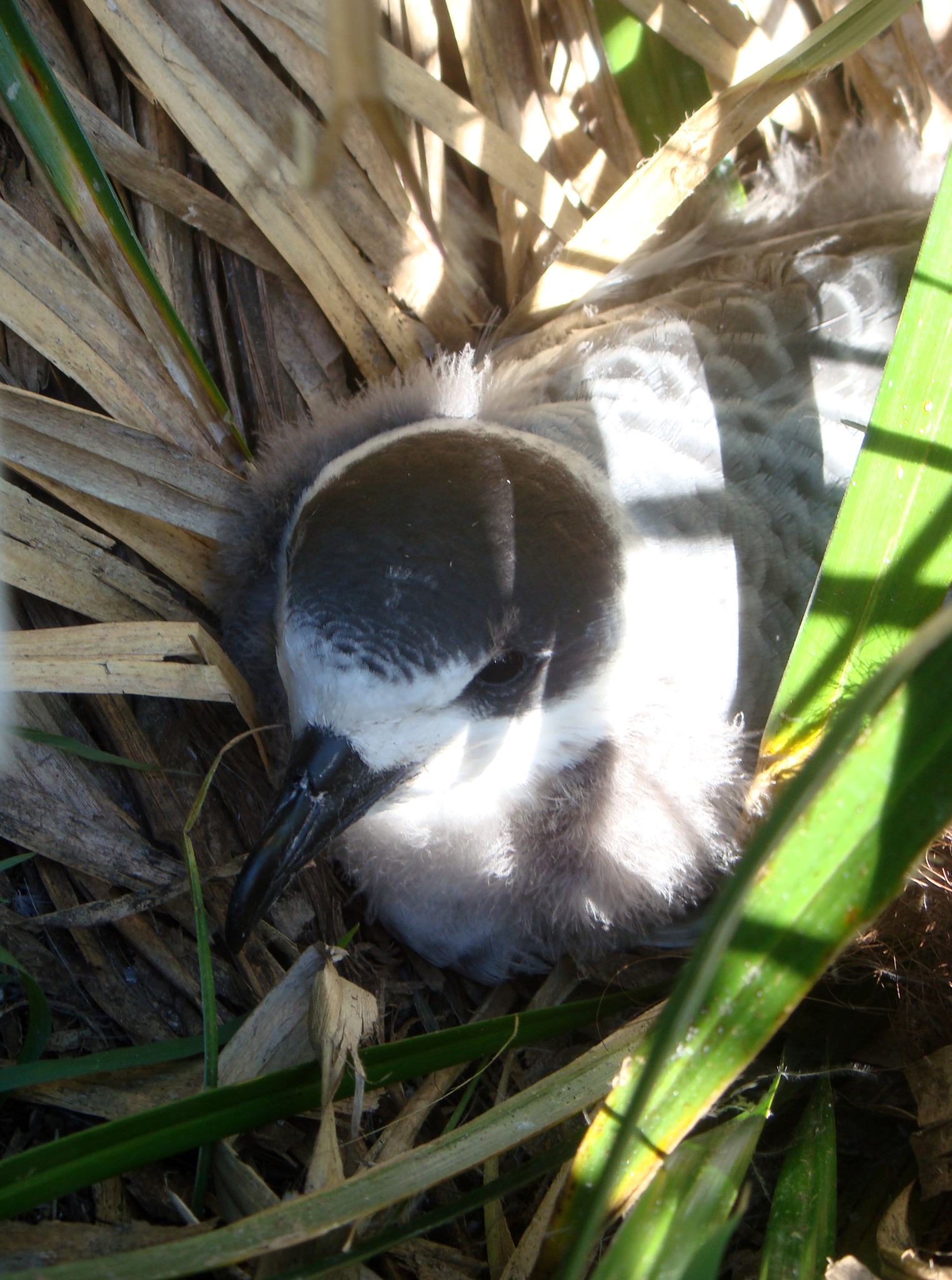
White-necked petrel nesting on the island

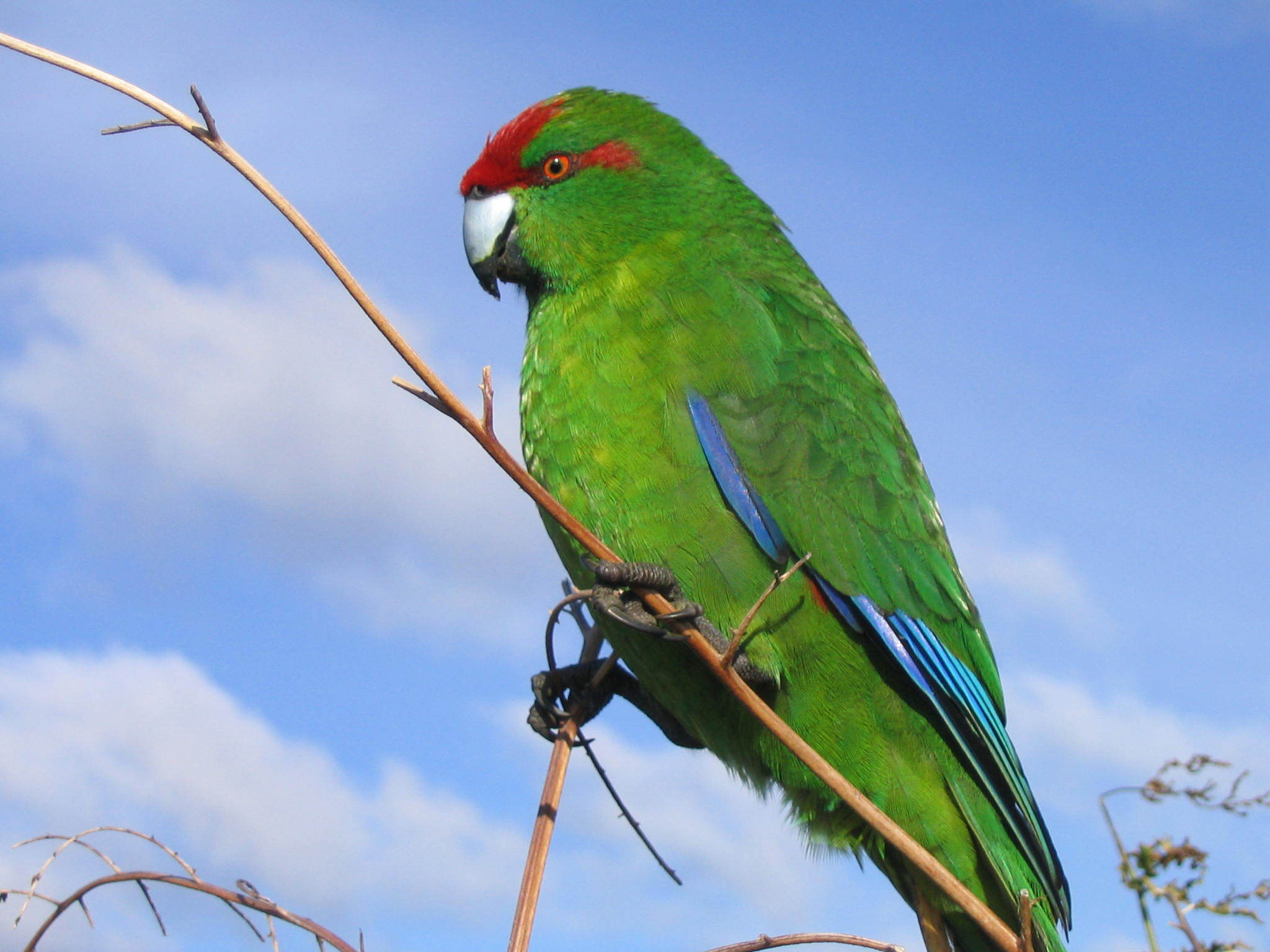
The Kermadec Parakeet

Most of the island is covered by beadfern and sedgeland; trees are rare. Several vegetation associations (Note: A plant association is the common occurrence of particular plants in similar environments.) occur, such as turf along the coasts, lichens and mosses on the northwestern cliffs, sedgelands mostly at the periphery of the island, shrubs at various sites, and dwarf ngaio and Homalanthus forests. Moisture-loving plants occur in the canyons and gullies. 68 plant species were recorded on Macauley Island in 2008, and there are bryophytes, lichens, lycophytes, pteridophytes, seaweeds and spermatophytes. One fungus was recorded in 2015, the artist's conk. Changes in vegetation occurred due to the introduction and eradication of pigs and goats; climatic changes may have caused a spread of ferns.

Macauley Island has the largest seabird population of New Zealand. Seabirds live on the sea and come to land only to breed; birds found breeding on Macauley Island include black noddies, black-winged petrels, grey noddies, Kermadec parakeets, Kermadec petrels, little shearwaters, masked boobies, red-tailed tropicbirds, sooty terns, wedge-tailed shearwaters, white-bellied storm petrels and white-naped petrels. Of these, the Kermadec parakeet is the only land bird on Macauley Island. Catastrophic volcanic eruptions that periodically wipe the animals out may be the reason why Macauley Island and other Kermadec islands lack endemic birds. In 1988, 5.2 million breeding birds were reported. They nest mainly in the sedgelands and cliffs, and both Macauley and Haszard Island are heavily burrowed by nesting seabirds. Birds may fly from the colonies on Macauley Island to islands farther west, such as Balls Pyramid and Lord Howe Island.

Invertebrates reported from the islands include ants, beetles, butterflies, centipedes, crickets, flies, moths, orthopterans, snails and spiders although centipedes were not recorded in 2011 and millipedes and earthworms were absent as well.

=== Marine organisms ===
Unlike the land-based fauna, the marine flora and fauna of the Kermadec Islands is mostly tropical and subtropical. It resembles that of Lord Howe Island more than that of New Zealand and there are reef-building corals. Reefs have been reported from boulders and rocks at depths of over 7 metres (23 ft). These reefs are dominated by algae with proper corals covering less than one per cent of the ground; there are no proper coral reefs at Macauley Island presumably owing to the only marginally suitable water temperatures, as has been observed at other subtropical sites. Spiny kelp occurs at Macauley Island, the northernmost occurrence of this species.

Squids, sharks, dolphins and crown-of-thorns starfish occur at Macauley Island. Other animal taxa include ascidians, bivalves, bony fish, cartilaginous fish, crabs, crinoids, echinoids, eels, gastropods, hermit crabs, hydrozoans, jellyfish, nudibranchs, ophiuroids, polychelida, porifers, sea anemones, sea pens, sea stars, soft corals, stony corals, tube worms and tunicates. Animal density is higher in areas of hydrothermal venting. About 105 mollusc taxa and many bryozoan species have been identified in the surrounding sea. Species discovered at Macauley Island and other Kermadec volcanoes are the crabs Gandalfus puia (Macauley Island and submarine volcanoes farther south) and Xenograpsus ngatama (Macauley Island and Brothers volcano), the crustacean Munidopsis maunga (Macauley caldera), and the mussel Vulcanidas isolatus (at Macauley Island and Giggenbach volcano).

=== Human activity and ecological impacts ===
The Polynesian rat was presumably introduced by Polynesians; goats and pigs were likely introduced by whalers in the 19th century probably as an emergency food supply for shipwrecked sailors; whalers also burned the shrubs of the island. The island was reported in 1789 to be heavily populated by rats and mice. Though not as severe as at Raoul Island, these introduced animals altered the ecosystem of the island, preying on birds and confining many plant species to inaccessible cliffs; they might be responsible for the absence of several birds known from Raoul Island on Macauley Island and for changes in the vegetation of Macauley Island between human visits during the 20th century. Plants may also have been imported by later visitors or birds. Flotsam and marine debris arriving from New Zealand is frequently reported.

In the late 20th century there were efforts to eradicate introduced species from the Kermadec Islands. Pigs had died out by 1910 and goats were removed in the 1960s by the New Zealand Wildlife Service; about 3,200 goats were killed during that occasion. After an initial delay due to concerns that toxic baits used for rat removal could impact parakeet populations, in 2006 the New Zealand Department of Conservation began an effort to eradicate the Polynesian rat. This eradication programme was probably successful, leading to the recovery of a more diverse fern-sedge vegetation that may still be underway as of 2015 and could lead to a future reduction of pure fernland. Rats and other rodents have never been reported from Haszard Island. Since the establishment of the Kermadec Islands Marine Reserve, certain activities such as discharging wastewaters, fishing, mining and laying submarine cables are prohibited around Macauley Island.

== Eruption history ==
The history of Macauley Island is easily recognised from the cliffs on its northern side, where five geological formations crop out; from bottom to top these are the North Cliff Lavas, the Boulder Beach Formation, the Annexation Lavas, the Sandy Bay Tephra and the Haszard Formation. Another formation, the Grand Canyon Formation, crops out in the east of the island. Tephra layers dating to 130,000, over 40,000, 30,000, 8,400 and 5,600 years ago identified in marine cores around Macauley Island may originate from eruptions there.

Rocks dip away from the northwestern side of the island and all the rocks appear to have been emplaced above sea level; there is no evidence for orogenic deformation although the presence of subaqueous lava flows indicates that recent eruptions occurred during a time of low sea level. During the sea level lowstand of the last glacial period, a much larger area of the island was exposed above sea level.

Pumices dredged from Macauley Island bear evidence of having formed through a unique process ("Tangaroan eruption"), where expanding magma forms a foam-like structure that fragments into several spherical pieces. These pieces upon contacting water solidify on the outside but remain molten on the inside. These pumice deposits are distinct from the Sandy Bay Tephra deposits and probably formed during further eruptions. The chemistry and density of Macauley Island pumices indicate a complex volcanic history.

=== Pre-Sandy Bay activity ===
The lava flows of the North Cliff Lavas are the oldest formation that crops out, and are part of a shield volcano with at least one crater. Little erosion took place before phreatomagmatic eruptions emplaced the tephras and lavas of the Boulder Beach Formation, presumably after water had entered the vent. Dykes, most of which are correlated to the Annexation Lavas, are intruded into the Boulder Beach Formation.

The Annexation Lavas are widespread on Macauley Island and also occur at Haszard Island and Newcombe Rock. Hawaiian eruptions of vents located northwest of present-day Macauley Island produced lava flows with average thicknesses of 1 metre (3 ft 3 in) or less intercalated with brown tephra. Dykes fed lava to additional vents, including the Newcombe Rock volcanic plug. Lava also ponded in a crater that crops out in Perpendicular Cliffs; the ponded lava was originally interpreted as a volcanic intrusion. The total volume of the Annexation Lavas is about 1 cubic kilometre (0.24 cu mi); they reach a total thicknesses of about 115 metres (377 ft). Along with volcanic activity, tectonic activity increased during the Annexation Lavas stage, giving rise to normal faulting and subsidence; at the end of the stage a summit crater was left. At this time, Macauley Island may have had a diameter of 4 kilometres (2.5 mi) and maximum elevation of 150 metres (490 ft).

=== Sandy Bay eruption ===
The Sandy Bay Tephra was erupted 7,200 or 6,310 years ago during the formation of the Macauley caldera from a shallow submarine vent close to Macauley Island, and is named after Sandy Bay. Its total volume is poorly known; an estimate of 100 cubic kilometres (24 cu mi) inferred from the caldera volume would make the Sandy Bay eruption one of the largest during the Holocene. It is also possible that the Macauley caldera formed during several eruptions. A submarine eruption jet breached the sea surface, producing at least 30 successive pyroclastic flows, pyroclastic surges and tephra fallout episodes on Macauley Island. The eruption products buried and sometimes eroded earlier deposits. The flows were cold, most likely from interaction with seawater. They buried the scrubby vegetation on Macauley Island, leaving wood casts in the rocks.

The Sandy Bay Tephra has a conspicuous white colour, contrasting with the dark colours of the rest of Macauley Island. It consists of dacitic tephra, which forms layered deposits containing lapilli, pumice, sand and fine volcanic ash. The total thickness of the Sandy Bay Tephra ranges from about 100 metres (330 ft) in the south to 15 metres (49 ft) in the north, with evidence of thicker deposits in topographic depressions. Basaltic and plutonic rocks are found embedded in the Sandy Bay rocks and reach sizes of 1.5 metres (4 ft 11 in); they indicate that older rocks were integrated into the erupting magma. The total volume of Sandy Bay Tephra on Macauley Island is about 0.1–0.2 cubic kilometres (0.024–0.048 cu mi) but it is likely that the total volume of the tephra was considerably larger. Erosion has affected the Sandy Bay Tephra, leaving cliffs around Haszard Islet.

Tephra from the Sandy Bay eruption has been identified in sediment cores taken around the island and forms concentric ridges on the western flank of submarine Macauley. It is likely that the eruption produced large amounts of pumice, which would have been transported by ocean currents to other islands in the south-west Pacific. Caldera collapse and collapses of caldera flanks perhaps produced tsunamis which may have hit the Bay of Plenty region of New Zealand. The Sandy Bay Tephra is the only demonstrated felsic eruption at Macauley volcano; the presence of obsidian and pitchstone in the Sandy Bay Tephra indicate that earlier felsic eruptions took place, but their dates are unknown.

=== Haszard Formation ===
The Haszard Formation makes up the bulk of exposed Macauley Island rocks. It includes the Parakeet Tuff, Haszard Scoria and Cascade Lava members, which probably were produced by the same eruptive episode. The 1 cubic kilometre (0.24 cu mi) Cascade Lava was produced from the craters at Mount Haszard and other vents; the lava flows reach thicknesses of 1–2 metres (3 ft 3 in – 6 ft 7 in) and their eventual course was strongly influenced by topography. The lavas were overlaid by the bedded Haszard Scoria. Submarine phreatomagmatic activity generated the Parakeet Tuff, which was erupted along with the Haszard Scoria and consists of lapilli and volcanic ash. Both the Haszard Scoria and the Parakeet Tuff include rafted blocks with diameters of 2 metres (6 ft 7 in).

The Parakeet Tuff and Haszard Scoria are thought to have originated in the southeastern sector of the caldera, 0.75 kilometres (0.47 mi) northwest of Macauley Island. Their emplacement may have begun decades or centuries after the Sandy Bay Tephra eruption, during which rainfall eroded the Sandy Bay Tephra and formed valleys later filled by the Haszard Formation. The eruption was centred at the crater of the Annexation Lavas and on flank vents and reached sub-Plinian dimensions. The crater eventually collapsed below sea level, perhaps during the slumping of the southeastern flank of Macauley Caldera, but the eruption continued as a Surtseyan eruption. Several small phreatic craters on southern Macauley Island probably relate to the Haszard Formation, as well as the Grand Canyon Formation which formed in a lake dammed in a valley at the eastern end of the island.

=== Historical eruptions and hydrothermal activity ===
Macauley Island is considered to be a dormant volcano. An eruption supposedly took place in 1825 at a "Brimstone Island" 45 kilometres (28 mi) west of Macauley Island, and another was reported 1 December 1887 north-north-east. These locations may be erroneous given the absence of bathymetric structures coinciding with their location, but they may be historical eruptions of the Macauley Island volcano. There are anecdotal reports of earthquakes, and a faint smell of sulfur was reported at the northern cliffs, next to the oldest rocks of Macauley Island.

Hydrothermal activity occurs in the submarine Macauley Cone, where white fluids and occasional bubbles emanate from rocks and chimney-shaped vents. Elemental sulfur occurs around the vents, which release warm (maximum temperature 112 °C (234 °F)) acidic mineral-rich waters with a brine-like composition and intense hydrothermal plumes. These waters may be derived from magmatic fluids and their helium isotope ratios appear to vary between observations. The influence of the hydrothermal emanations extends 7 kilometres (4.3 mi) from the volcano. One or two other vent sites are suspected to exist in the Macauley Caldera. There is evidence that a lake of molten sulfur once filled the Macauley Cone crater and left sulfur deposits with thicknesses exceeding 1 metre (3 ft 3 in).

A vent biota consisting of mussels has been established around the hydrothermal vents: Vulcanidas isolatus at shallow depths and Gigantidas gladius at both shallow and intermediate depths. Sea stars prey on them while crabs and tonguefish graze at the sulfurous crater walls. The hydrothermal activity occurs at shallow depths, thus fluids can enter the photic zone where biological productivity is highest.

== See also ==
- New Zealand outlying islands – Nine small groups of islands belonging to New Zealand
- List of volcanoes in New Zealand
- List of islands of New Zealand
- List of islands
- Island restoration – Ecological restoration of islands and island groups
- Desert island – Island without human residents
