= Cheeseman Island =

Island in New Zealand

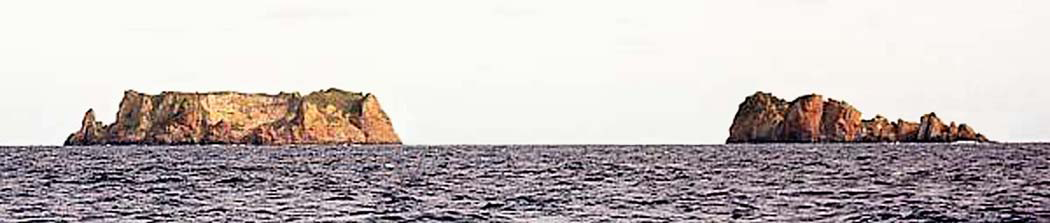
- Cheeseman Island (right) and Curtis Island from north.

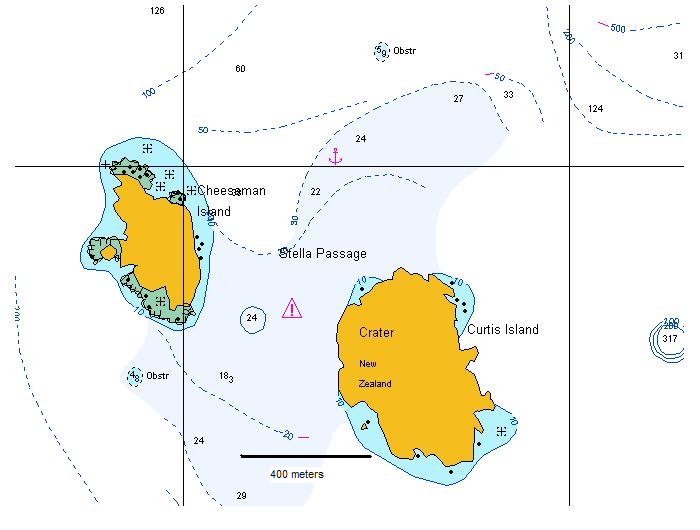
- Map

Geography
- Coordinates: 30°32′12″S 178°34′05″W
- Archipelago: Kermadec Islands
- Area: 7.6 ha (19 acres)

Administration
- New Zealand

Demographics
- Population: 0

Cheeseman Island is a 7.6 ha (19-acre) rocky volcanic island in the southwest Pacific Ocean (located at 30°32′12″S 178°34′05″W). It is named after Thomas Frederick Cheeseman of the Auckland Museum, who was on board the New Zealand Government steamer 'Stella' when it visited the island in 1887. It neighbours Curtis Island to the east and lies about 20 km (12 mi) south of Macauley Island. They are part of the Kermadec Islands, an outlying island group of New Zealand, located halfway between New Zealand's North Island and the nation of Tonga.

== Flora and fauna ==
Apart from a short stretch of its west coast, the island is bordered by cliffs, making access from the sea difficult. It is rugged and rocky, with little woody vegetation. Between the two high points of the island is a central valley where the vegetation is dominated by the sedge Cyperus ustulatus, while the surrounding slopes are dominated by a mix of Parietaria debilis and Disphyma australe. The island forms part of the Kermadec Islands Important Bird Area, identified as such by BirdLife International because it is an important site for nesting seabirds. Seabirds breeding on the island include Kermadec and black-winged petrels, Kermadec little shearwaters and sooty terns.

== See also ==
- List of islands of New Zealand
- List of islands
- Desert island
