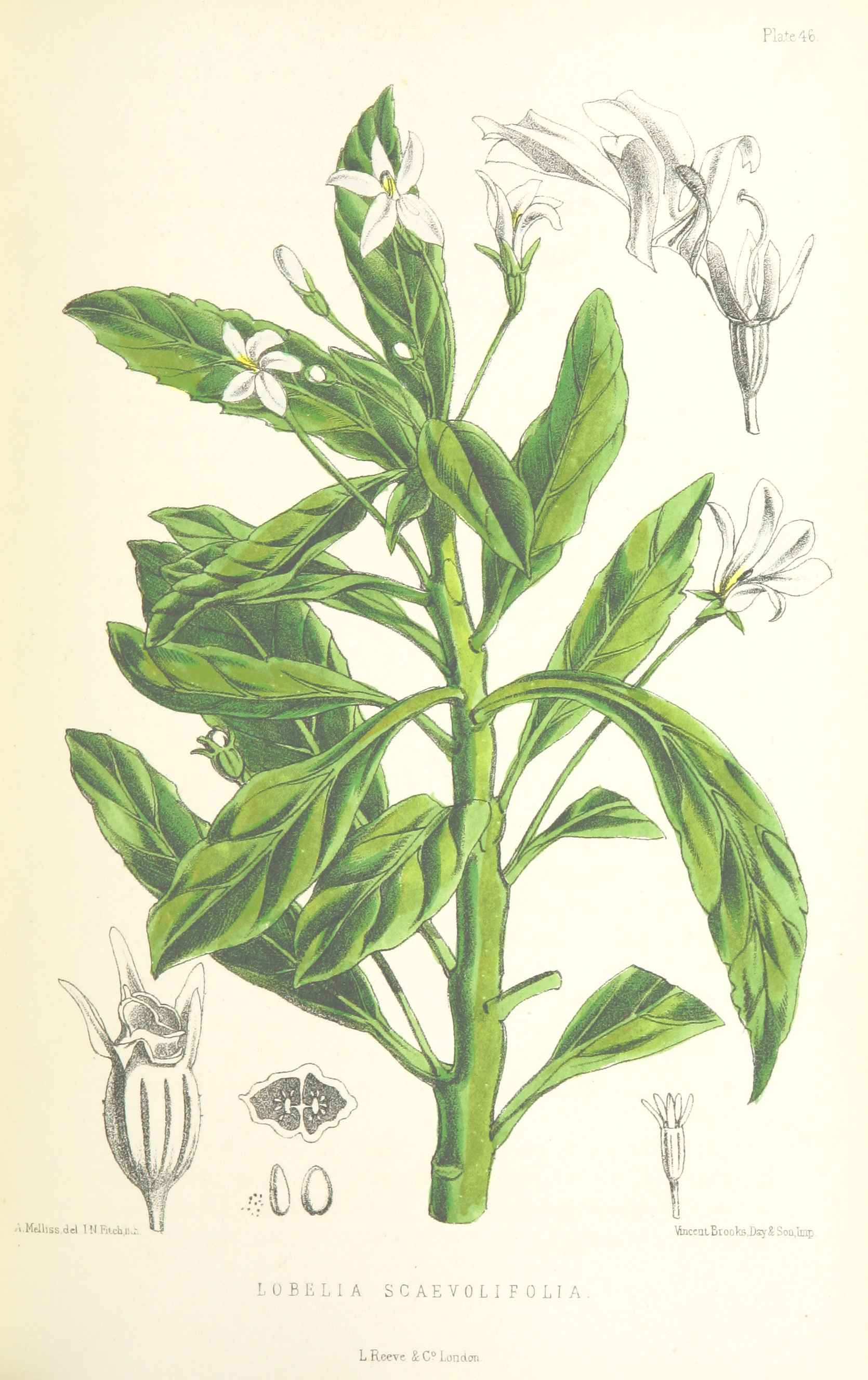
- Trimeris scaevolifolia

Scientific classification
- Kingdom: Plantae
- Clade: Embryophytes
- Clade: Tracheophytes
- Clade: Spermatophytes
- Clade: Angiosperms
- Clade: Eudicots
- Clade: Asterids
- Order: Asterales
- Family: Campanulaceae
- Genus: Trimeris; C.Presl

Species
- Trimeris anceps (L.f.) E.B.Knox; Trimeris scaevolifolia (Roxb.) Mabb.

= Trimeris =

Genus of flowering plants

Trimeris is a genus of flowering plants in the family Campanulaceae. It includes two species of shrubs or subshrubs native to the subtropical southern hemisphere.

- Trimeris anceps (L.f.) E.B.Knox – Chile, Southern Africa, Madagascar, Australia, New Zealand, and the Tubuai Islands
- Trimeris scaevolifolia (Roxb.) Mabb. – Saint Helena
