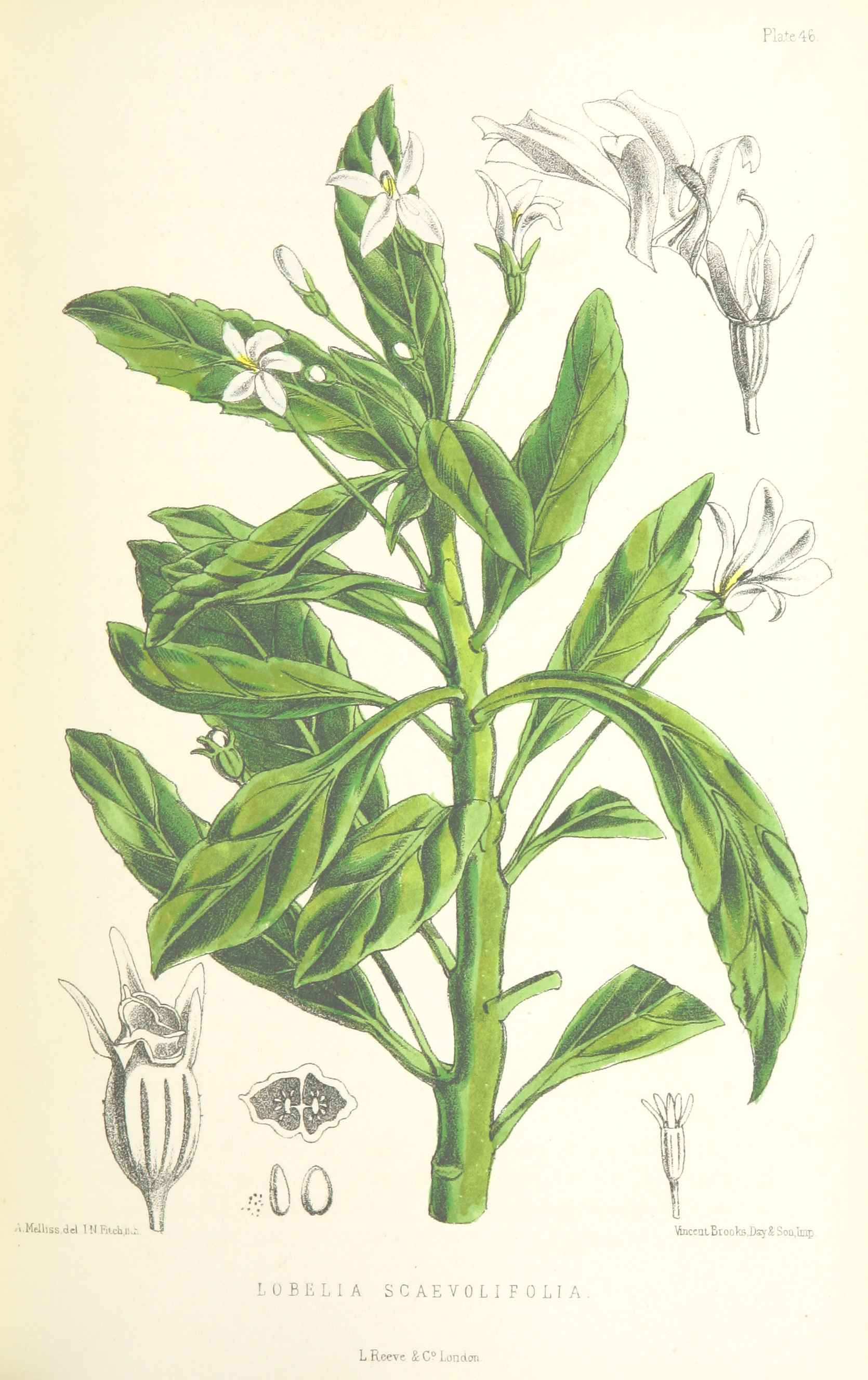

Conservation status
- Vulnerable (IUCN 3.1)

Scientific classification
- Kingdom: Plantae
- Clade: Embryophytes
- Clade: Tracheophytes
- Clade: Spermatophytes
- Clade: Angiosperms
- Clade: Eudicots
- Clade: Asterids
- Order: Asterales
- Family: Campanulaceae
- Genus: Trimeris
- Species: T. scaevolifolia

Binomial name
- Trimeris scaevolifolia (Roxb.) Mabb.

Synonyms
- Dortmanna scaevolifolia (Roxb.) Kuntze; Lobelia scaevolifolia Roxb.; Trimeris oblongifolia C.Presl

= Trimeris scaevolifolia =

St Helena lobelia

Genus of flowering plants

Trimeris scaevolifolia is a species of flowering plant in the family Campanulaceae. Its common name is St. Helena lobelia. It is a shrub endemic to the island of Saint Helena in the South Atlantic Ocean.

== Description ==
Trimeris scaevolifolia is a stout fleshy pale bright green, glabrous shrub, 1–2 m tall, branches lactiferous, shiny, succulent with conspicuous leaf scars. Leaves 4-12 x 1–4 cm, oblong-ovate to wedge and lance tip shaped, tapered but not sharply pointed, hairless smooth, glossy and rather succulent, somewhat clustered at tips of branches, exceeding the flowers. Leaf margin regularly toothed to finely serrate, although flower leaves may be entire. Inflorescence from the leaf axil 1-2-3 flowered. Flower stems 4–6 cm, erect bare. Sepals 4–7 mm, more or less linear, entire, blunt. Corolla 5-lobed, 10–22 mm x ca 12 mm, white with yellow markings, somewhat hairy inside the tube. Upper lobes 2, linear, pointed. Lower 3 lobes forming a 3-lobed lip, with lobes 5 mm long. Stamens with stalks minutely hairy. Ovary 6-8 mm long, with 2 compartments, obconic 10 ribbed, capsules obconic to club shaped, opening by 2 valves in upper part. Seeds smooth, small. It flowers usually in the winter and spring months, August to November. It is located on the central ridge above 700 m. There are patches near Cuckhold's Point, Mt Actaeon and also at High Peak and the Depot. The population fluctuates considerably as it regenerates best in disturbed open habitats. Among else it is found along path sides and also on the trunks of tree ferns. It is relatively short lived and disappears from overgrown places. Although the capsule resembles that of other Lobelia species, the branching and habit is otherwise unknown in that genus. In the past it was a constituent of thick, well-shaded forests. The old vernacular name 'milkwood' given to it by early settlers derives from the milky sap exuded from cut branches.

== Taxonomy ==
The species was first described as Lobelia scaevolifolia by William Roxburgh in 1816. In 1974 David Mabberley placed the species in genus Trimeris as T. scaevolifolia.

== See also ==
- Flora of Saint Helena
