= Kermadec megapode =

Scientific classification
- Domain: Eukaryota
- Kingdom: Animalia
- Phylum: Chordata
- Class: Aves
- Order: Galliformes
- Family: Megapodiidae
- Genus: Megapodius
- Species: †M. 'Raoul Island'

Binomial name
- †Megapodius 'Raoul Island'

Extinct population of megapode on the Kermadec Islands

The Kermadec megapode, also known as the Raoul Island scrubfowl (Megapodius sp. nov. 'Raoul Island'), was a population of land fowl that inhabited Raoul Island of the Kermadec Islands in New Zealand. There is disagreement in whether the Kermadec megapode was a unique species or simply an isolated population of another species of megapode. It is said to have gone extinct in 1876 due to a volcanic eruption on the island. The population may have gone extinct due to factors other than the eruption, such as the introduction of mammalian predators or overhunting by humans.

== Description and habitat ==
Like all megapodes, the species would have had large feet with sharp claws, as they were ground nesting terrestrials. Megapodes are also characterised by their short beaks, large wings, and small heads. The bird was described as an omnivore that primarily inhabited forests on the floor of the Raoul caldera, the island's crater. They laid eggs in "mounds of sand and decayed leaves" around 1 metre (3.3 ft) in height. According to a former resident of the island named Johnson, their habitat was covered in mud during the volcanic eruption, killing the species.

== Points for its uniqueness ==
Knowledge of this species' existence is based on an account from New Zealand botanist Thomas Cheeseman, who included a unique megapode in his list of Raoul Island birds based on a report by Johnson. In 2000, the humerus of a different species described by Johnson was confirmed to have been discovered at an archaeological site on Raoul Island, which may add credibility to his claims regarding local wildlife during his settlement on the island. It is possible that an unidentified species of megapode was brought to the island by Polynesian explorers, before the species went extinct everywhere but the Kermadec Islands.

== Points against its uniqueness ==
There are no whole or partial specimens for biologists to analyse in order to determine the uniqueness of the megapodes found on the island. Considering the island's volcanic history, it is unlikely that an endemic species of bird would have developed or migrated to live only on the island in the 5000 years between the 1876 eruption and the one prior. The lack of other terrestrial endemic species on the Kermadec Islands suggests that the Kermadec megapode was unlikely to have been an endemic taxon, but instead a population of another extinct Polynesian species within the Megapodius genus.
