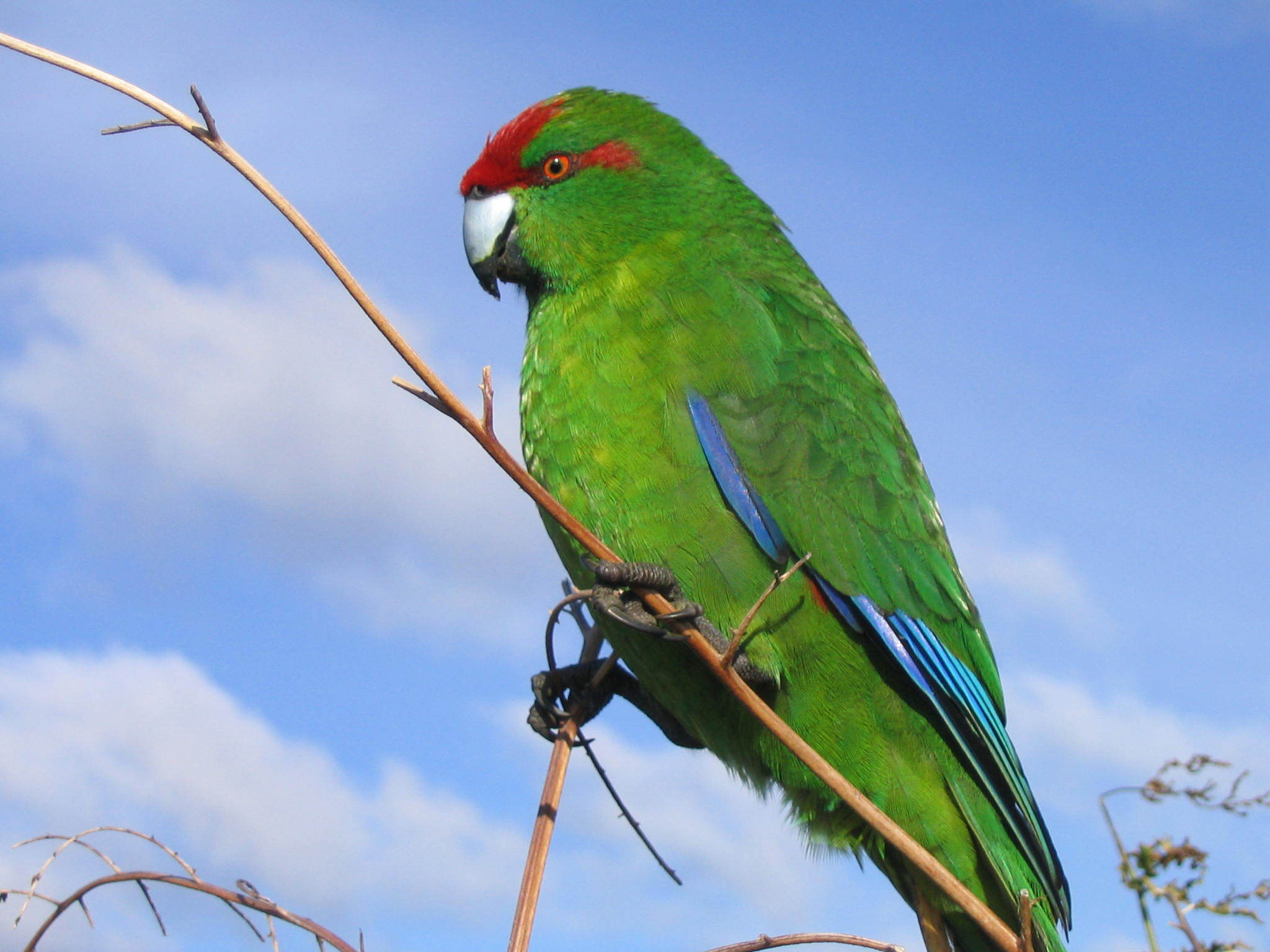

Scientific classification
- Kingdom: Animalia
- Phylum: Chordata
- Class: Aves
- Order: Psittaciformes
- Family: Psittaculidae
- Genus: Cyanoramphus
- Species: C. novaezelandiae
- Subspecies: C. n. cyanurus

Trinomial name
- Cyanoramphus novaezelandiae cyanurus Salvadori, 1891

Synonyms
- Cyanoramphus cyanurus

= Kermadec red-crowned parakeet =

Subspecies of bird

The Kermadec red-crowned parakeet (Cyanoramphus novaezelandiae cyanurus), also known as the Kermadec red-fronted parakeet or Kermadec parakeet, is a parrot endemic to New Zealand's Kermadec Islands in the south-west Pacific Ocean. It is a subspecies of the red-fronted parakeet, and sometimes considered a full species. It is also the first documented example of a parrot recolonising an island after the removal of invasive predators.

== Description ==
The Kermadec red-crowned parakeet is a medium-sized, predominantly green parrot with a crimson cap and eye-stripe. At about 29 cm in length, and 80-90 g in weight, it is significantly larger than the nominate subspecies, as well as having noticeably bluer plumage.

== Distribution ==
The parakeet is found in the Kermadec group, which lies about 1000 km NNE of New Zealand's North Island, and 900 km SSW of Tongas 'Ata Island. However, it was eradicated from the principal island in the group, 30 km^{2} Raoul, in the early 19th century, with the last records of breeding there in 1836, as a consequence of the introduction by humans of goats, cats, and both brown and Polynesian rats. It survived only on the nearby Herald Islets 2–4 km away, where there are about 50 breeding pairs, and on 3 km^{2} Macauley Island some 100 km to the south with about 8-10,000 birds.

For 172 years no breeding was recorded on Raoul, although occasional vagrant individual birds were seen. In 2008, following island restoration that included the removal of goats by 1986, the rats by 2004 and the cats by 2006, red-crowned parakeets were again recorded breeding on Raoul Island, presumably having recolonised it from the Herald Islets.

== Behaviour ==
The parakeets are normally seen in pairs or small groups outside the breeding season. They may form flocks, though some pairs remain alone through the year. They forage on or near the ground, congregating at water sources to drink and bathe. Flocks will occasionally fly to neighbouring islands to forage.
