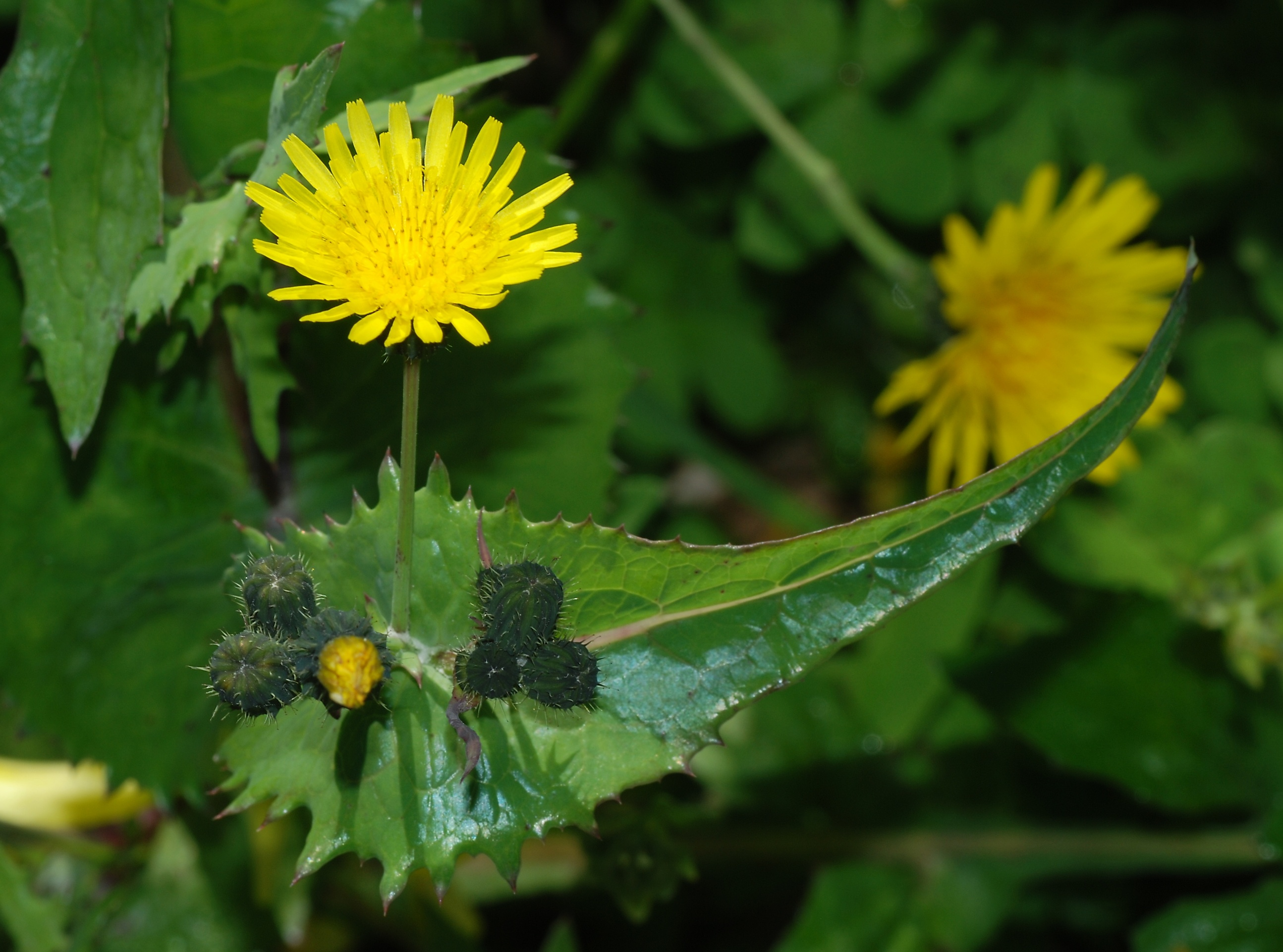

Scientific classification
- Kingdom: Plantae
- Clade: Tracheophytes
- Clade: Angiosperms
- Clade: Eudicots
- Clade: Asterids
- Order: Asterales
- Family: Asteraceae
- Genus: Sonchus
- Species: S. oleraceus

Binomial name
- Sonchus oleraceus L. 1753 not Wall. 1831

Synonyms
- Synonymy: Carduus amplexicaulis Noronha; Sonchus angustissimus Hook.f.; Sonchus australis Trevir.; Sonchus ciliatus Lam.; Sonchus fabrae Sennen; Sonchus glaber Gilib.; Sonchus gracilis Phil.; Sonchus gracilis Sennen; Sonchus lacerus Willd.; Sonchus laevis Vill.; Sonchus longifolius Trevir.; Sonchus macrotus Fenzl; Sonchus pallescens Pančić; Sonchus parviflorus Lej. ex Rchb.; Sonchus reversus E.Mey. ex DC.; Sonchus rivularis Phil.; Sonchus roseus Besser ex Spreng.; Sonchus royleanus DC.; Sonchus runcinatus (Fiori) Zenari; Sonchus schimperi A.Braun & Bouché; Sonchus schmidianus K.Koch; Sonchus spinulifoius Sennen; Sonchus subbipinnatifidus (Guss.) Zenari; Sonchus sundaicus Blume; Sonchus tenerrimus Schur 1866 not L. 1753; Sonchus umbellifer Thunb.; Sonchus zacinthoides DC.

= Sonchus oleraceus =

Common sowthistle

Species of flowering plant

Sonchus oleraceus is a species of flowering plant in the tribe Cichorieae of the family Asteraceae, native to Europe and Western Asia. It has many common names including common sowthistle, sow thistle, smooth sow thistle, annual sow thistle, puha (in New Zealand English, from Māori pūhā), hare's colwort, hare's thistle, milky tassel, milk thistle, and soft thistle.

== Description ==
This annual plant has a hollow, upright stem up to 30 to 100 centimetres (12 to 39 in) high. It prefers full sun, and can tolerate most soil conditions. The flowers are hermaphroditic, and common pollinators include bees and flies. It spreads by seeds being carried by wind or water.

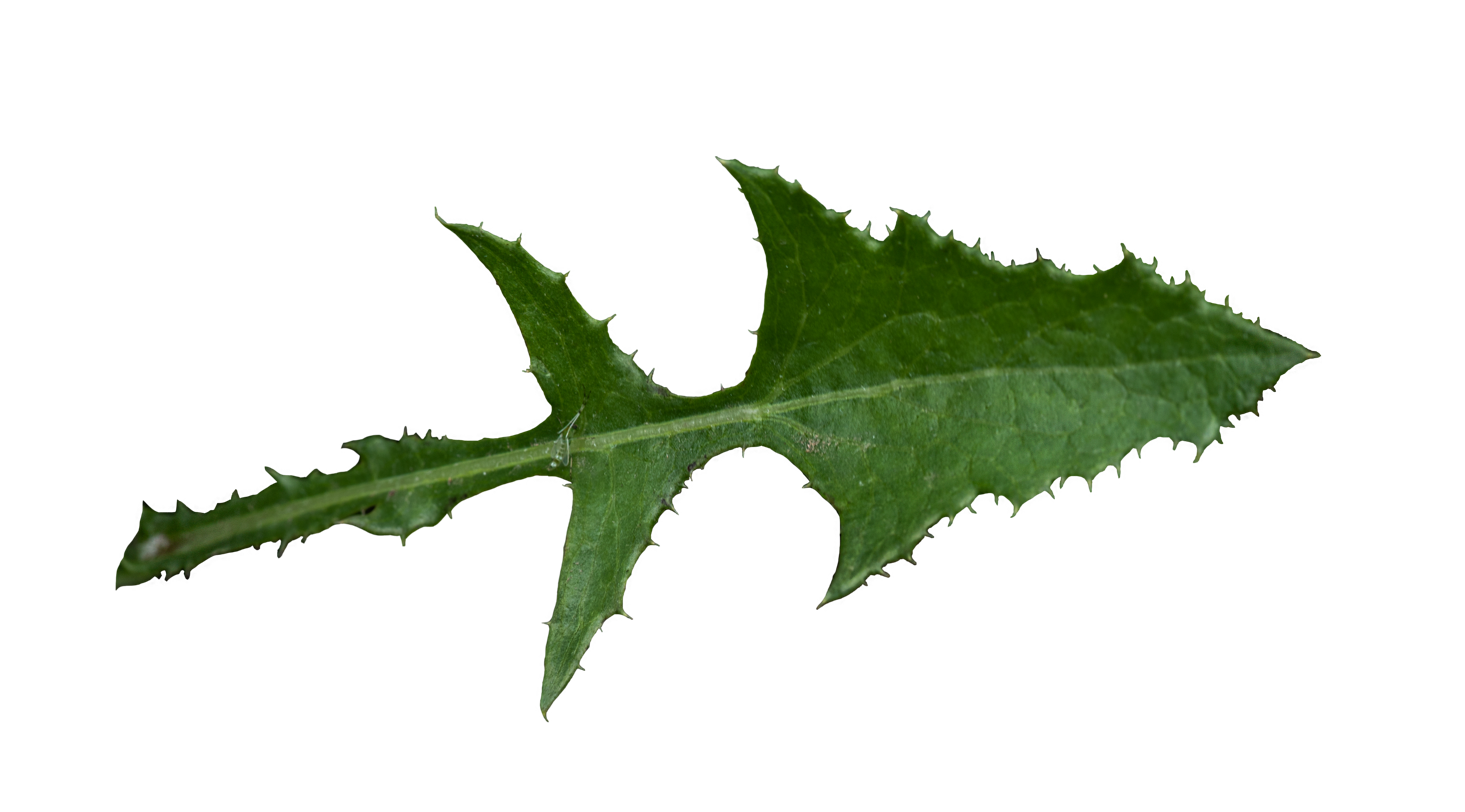
Runcinate leaf

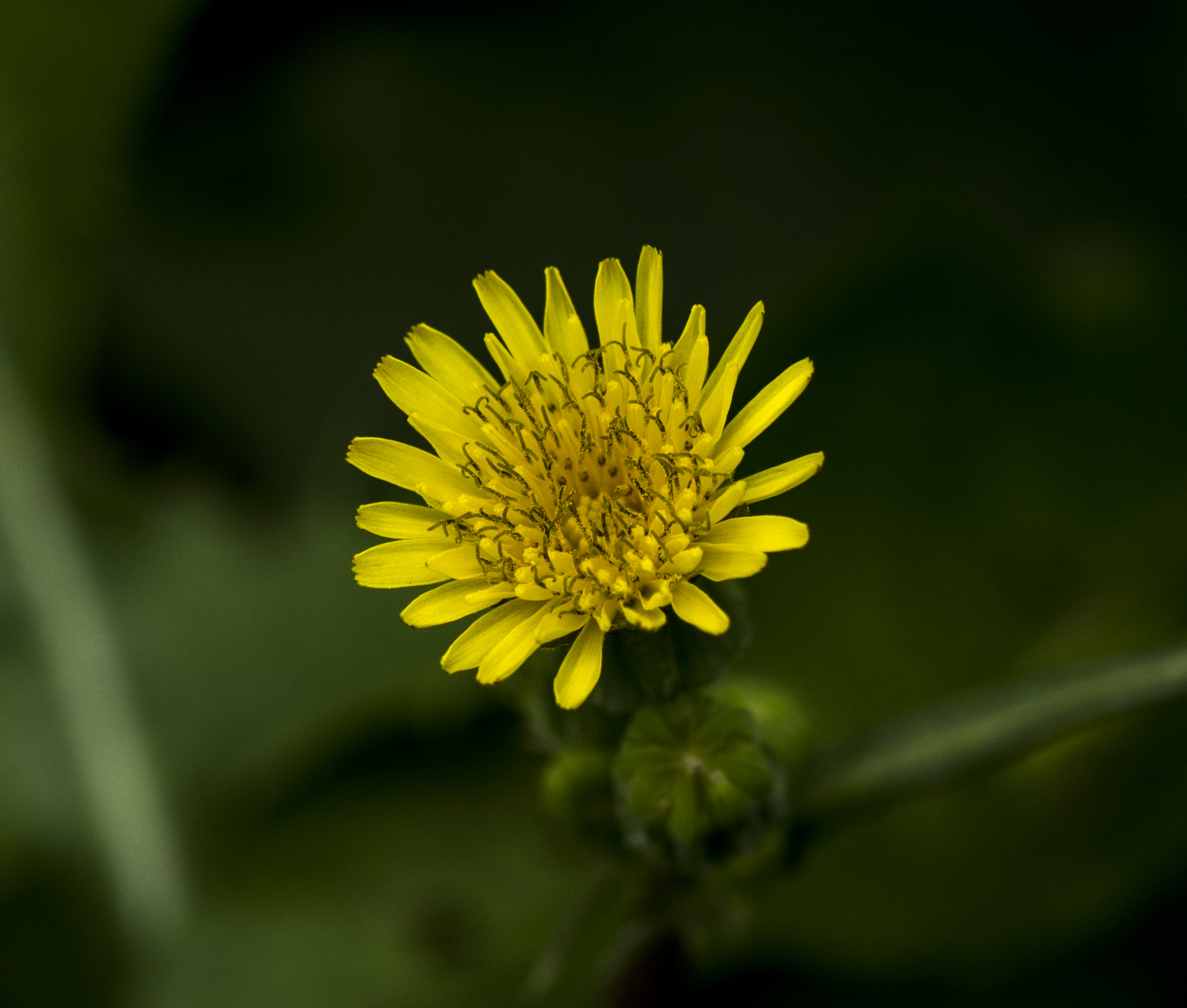
Flower

== Etymology ==
Its specific epithet oleraceus means "vegetable/herbal". (Note: For the generic name's etymology, see Sonchus.) The common name 'sow thistle' refers to its appeal to pigs, and the similarity of the leaf to younger thistle plants. The common name 'hare's thistle' refers to its purported beneficial effects on hare and rabbits.

== Invasiveness ==
Annual sowthistle is considered an invasive species due to its rapid growth, prolific seed production, and wide dispersal. The plant thrives in disturbed environments, such as roadsides and agricultural fields, spreading aggressively through wind-dispersed seeds. It forms dense populations that outcompete native vegetation by quickly establishing in open areas, particularly after soil disturbance. Sowthistle's resilience to various soil types and its ability to reseed itself make it difficult to control in many regions.

In Australia it is a common and widespread invasive species, with large infestations a serious problem in crops.

== Uses ==
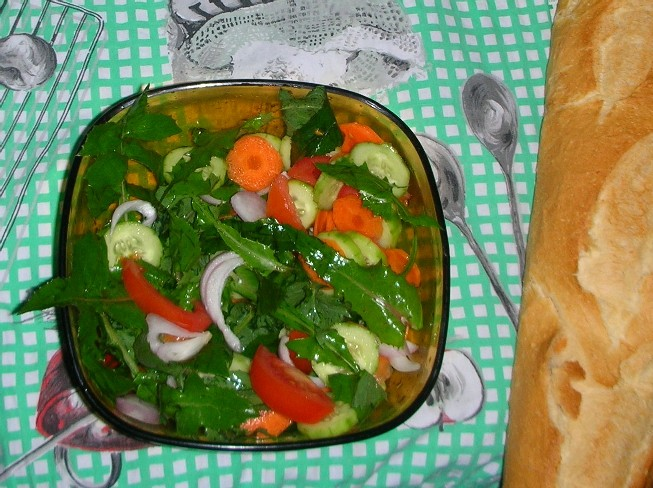
Green salad with carrot, cucumber, onion, sowthistle leaves, and tomato slices

The leaves are eaten as salad greens or cooked like spinach. This is one of the species used in Chinese cuisine as kŭcài (苦菜; lit. bitter vegetable). The younger leaves are less bitter and better to eat raw. Steaming can remove the bitterness of older leaves. The younger roots are also edible and can suffice as a coffee substitute.

=== Nutrition ===
Nutritional analysis reveals 30–40 mg of vitamin C per 100 g of plant, 1.2% protein, 0.3% fat, 2.4% carbohydrate. Leaf dry matter analysis per 100 g (likely to vary with growing conditions) shows: 45 g carbohydrate, 28 g protein, 22 g ash, 5.9 g fibre, 4.5 g fat; in all, providing 265 calories.

Minerals

- Calcium: 1500 mg
- Phosphorus: 500 mg
- Iron: 45.6 mg
- Magnesium: 0 mg
- Sodium: 0 mg
- Potassium: 0 mg
- Zinc: 0 mg

Vitamins

- A: 35 mg
- Thiamine (B_{1}): 1.5 mg
- Riboflavin (B_{2}): 5 mg
- Niacin: 5 mg
- B_{6}: 0 mg
- C: 60 mg

=== Herbalism ===
Sonchus oleraceus has a variety of uses in herbalism. It also has been ascribed medicinal qualities similar to dandelion and succory. When the plant was introduced to New Zealand, the Māori people found it similar to and as palatable as their native pūhā or S. kirkii (also known as raurōroa), thus also picked up S. oleraceus (since also named rauriki) for similar food and medical use.

Native Americans had many uses for this plant. Pima used its gum as a "cure for the opium habit", as a cathartic, and as a food, where the "leaves and stems [were] rubbed between the palms of the hands and eaten raw" and sometimes "boiled". The Yaqui used the plant as a vegetable, where the "tender, young leaves [were] boiled in salted water with chile and eaten as greens." The Kamia (Kumeyaay) "boiled leaves for food as greens". The Houma used it as an abortifacient where an "infusion of [the] plant [was] taken to 'make tardy menstruation come;'" an antidiarrheal; for children that were teething; and as hog feed.

The Samaritans eat the leafs of this bitter plant on the feast of passover. The bitter leafs are eaten together with Paschal lamb and unleavened bread, as dictated by the Bible (Exodus 12, 8): "They shall eat the flesh that night, roasted on the fire; with unleavened bread and bitter herbs they shall eat it." Thus, the Samaritans identify Sonchus oleraceus with the bitter herbs.
