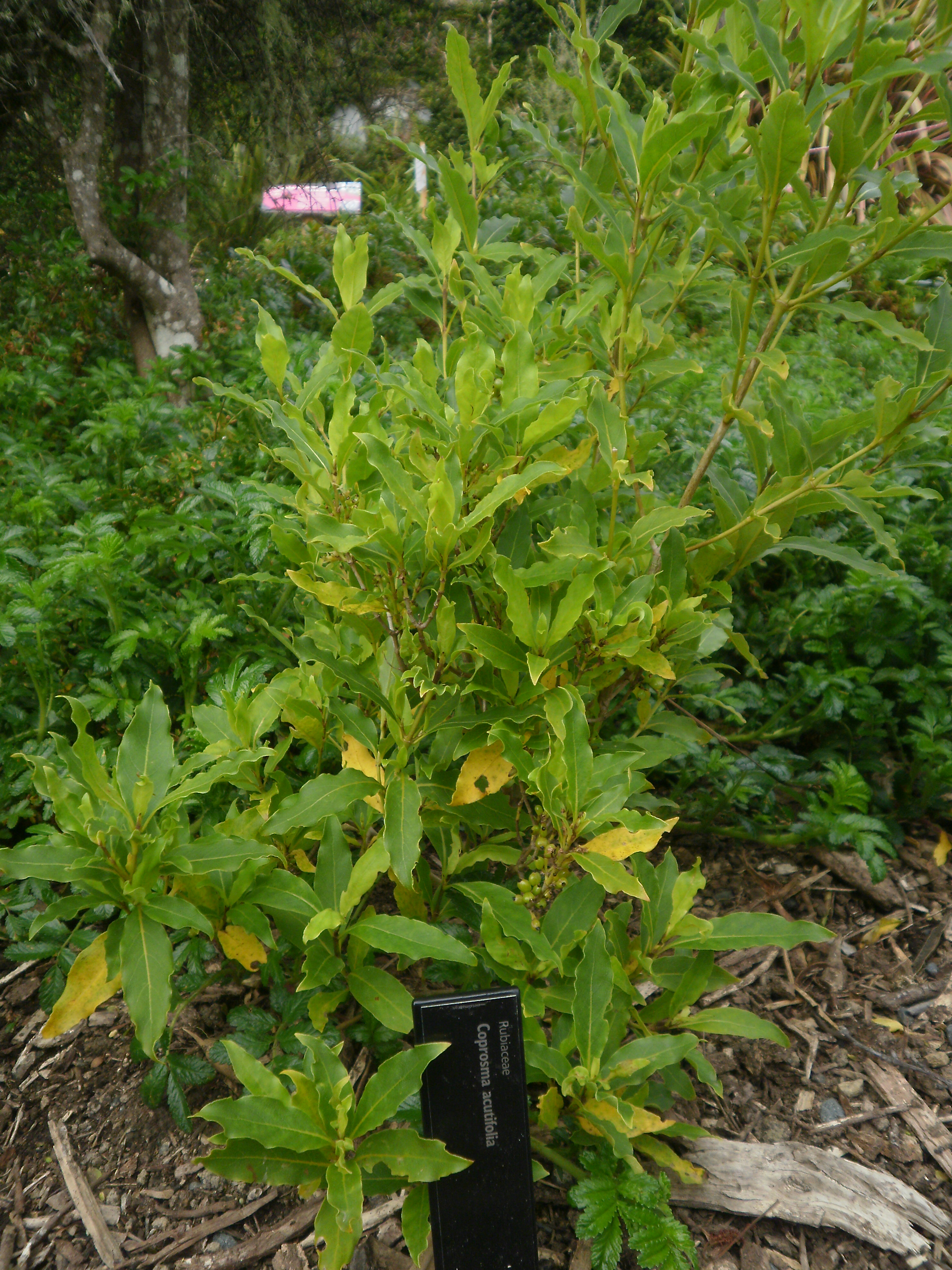

Scientific classification
- Kingdom: Plantae
- Clade: Tracheophytes
- Clade: Angiosperms
- Clade: Eudicots
- Clade: Asterids
- Order: Gentianales
- Family: Rubiaceae
- Genus: Coprosma
- Species: C. acutifolia

Binomial name
- Coprosma acutifolia Hook.f.

= Coprosma acutifolia =

Species of plant

Coprosma acutifolia, is a shrub that is native to New Zealand, found only on Raoul Island. First described in 1856, it can grow in wet or dry forest, becoming a sub-canopy tree at lower altitudes and a canopy species along ridgelines.

== Description ==
It is a small, bushy tree reaching 12 m (39 ft) in height. The branches are slender, hairless and grow in an ascending pattern. Bark is greenish-grey, maturing to grey and flaking in small, rectangular, thin shards. Leaves are narrow and tapering usually 60–90 mm in length; they are typically yellow-green and frequently mottled with dark green. The flowers are sexually dimorphic, with male and female flowers appearing on separate plants.

== Etymology ==
The genus name, Coprosma derives from the Greek kopros ("dung") and osme ("smell"), and describes the genus' foul smell, while the specific epithet, acutifolia, derives from Latin, and means "sharp-leaved".
