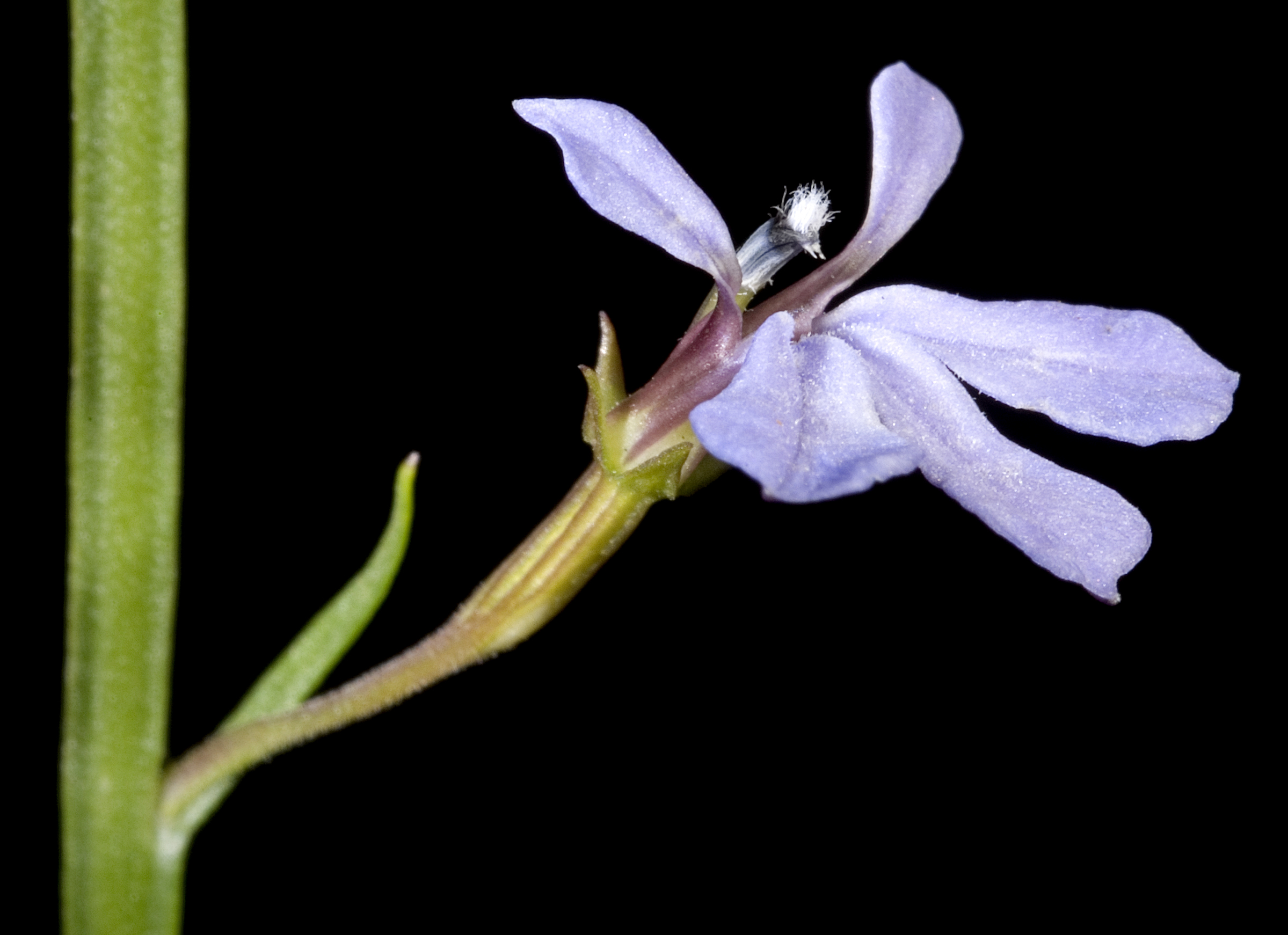

Scientific classification
- Kingdom: Plantae
- Clade: Embryophytes
- Clade: Tracheophytes
- Clade: Spermatophytes
- Clade: Angiosperms
- Clade: Eudicots
- Clade: Asterids
- Order: Asterales
- Family: Campanulaceae
- Genus: Trimeris
- Species: T. anceps

Binomial name
- Trimeris anceps (L.f.) E.B.Knox

Synonyms
- Synonymy: Dobrowskya anceps (L.f.) C.Presl; Dortmanna anceps (L.f.) Kuntze; Enchysia repens (Thunb.) C.Presl; Laurentia repens (Thunb.) Benth. & Hook.f.; Lobelia alata Labill.; Lobelia alata var. angustifolia R.Br., not validly publ.; Lobelia alata var. cuneiformis (Labill.) R.Br.; Lobelia alata var. longisepala E.Wimm.; Lobelia alata var. minor (Sond.) E.Wimm.; Lobelia alata var. ottoniana (C.Presl) E.Wimm.; Lobelia alata var. rudatisii (Schltr.) E.Wimm.; Lobelia alata var. stolonifera Endl.; Lobelia anceps L.f. in Suppl. Pl.: 395 (1782); Lobelia anceps var. alata (Labill.) B.Heyne; Lobelia anceps var. cuneiformis (Labill.) A.DC.; Lobelia anceps var. minor Sond.; Lobelia anceps var. vagans R.D.Good; Lobelia angustifolia Benth., nom. illeg. homonym. post.; Lobelia cuneiformis Labill.; Lobelia decumbens Sims, nom. illeg. homonym. post.; Lobelia erecta de Vriese; Lobelia longiracemosa R.D.Good; Lobelia ottoniana (C.Presl) A.DC.; Lobelia pubescens Willd., not validly publ.; Lobelia repens Thunb.; Lobelia rhizophyta Spreng.; Lobelia rudatisii Schltr.; Lobelia rupincola Bertero ex Colla; Lobelia saxicola de Vriese; Lobelia stricta de Vriese, nom. illeg. homonym. post.; Lobelia uncinata de Vriese; Rapuntium alatum (Labill.) C.Presl; Rapuntium anceps (L.f.) Chaz.; Rapuntium cuneiforme (Labill.) C.Presl; Rapuntium ottonianum C.Presl

= Trimeris anceps =

Angled lobelia

Species of flowering plant

Trimeris anceps (synonym Lobelia anceps), commonly known as angled lobelia, is a small herbaceous plant in the family Campanulaceae. It is a small, perennial herb with blue to purple flowers. It grows in several states of Australia, New Zealand, the Tubuai Islands, Chile, southern Africa, and Madagascar.

== Description ==
Lobelia anceps is a prostrate to ascending, glabrous, perennial herb typically growing to a height of 50 cm (20 in), occasionally branches rooting at nodes. The leaves are variable, angled or more or less winged, linear-elliptic, oblong to oval spoon-shaped, 10–85 mm (0.39–3.35 in) long, 1.5–20 mm (0.059–0.787 in) wide, toothed or smooth, and often red to purplish at the base and the petiole 0–20 mm (0.00–0.79 in) long. The blue, purple or occasionally white flowers are borne singly in leaf axils on a pedicel 2–12 mm (0.079–0.472 in) long. The corolla usually 5–15 mm (0.20–0.59 in) long, the two upper petals narrower than the three lower petals. Flowering occurs mostly in summer and autumn and the fruit is a conical shaped capsule covered in soft, upright hairs or smooth, 5–15 mm (0.20–0.59 in) long and 1.5–3 mm (0.059–0.118 in) in diameter.

== Taxonomy and naming ==
The species was first formally described as Lobelia anceps by Carl Linnaeus the Younger in 1782, and the description was published in Supplementum Plantarum. The specific epithet (anceps) means "two-sided, double, flattened", referring to the leaves. In 2024 Eric B. Knox placed the species in genus Trimeris as T. anceps.

== Distribution and habitat ==
In Australia Angled lobelia is found along the banks of pools, creeks and rivers along coastal areas in New South Wales, Victoria, Queensland and South Australia. In Western Australia it grows between the Mid West and Goldfields-Esperance regions of Western Australia in sandy-peat-clay soils over granite or limestone.
