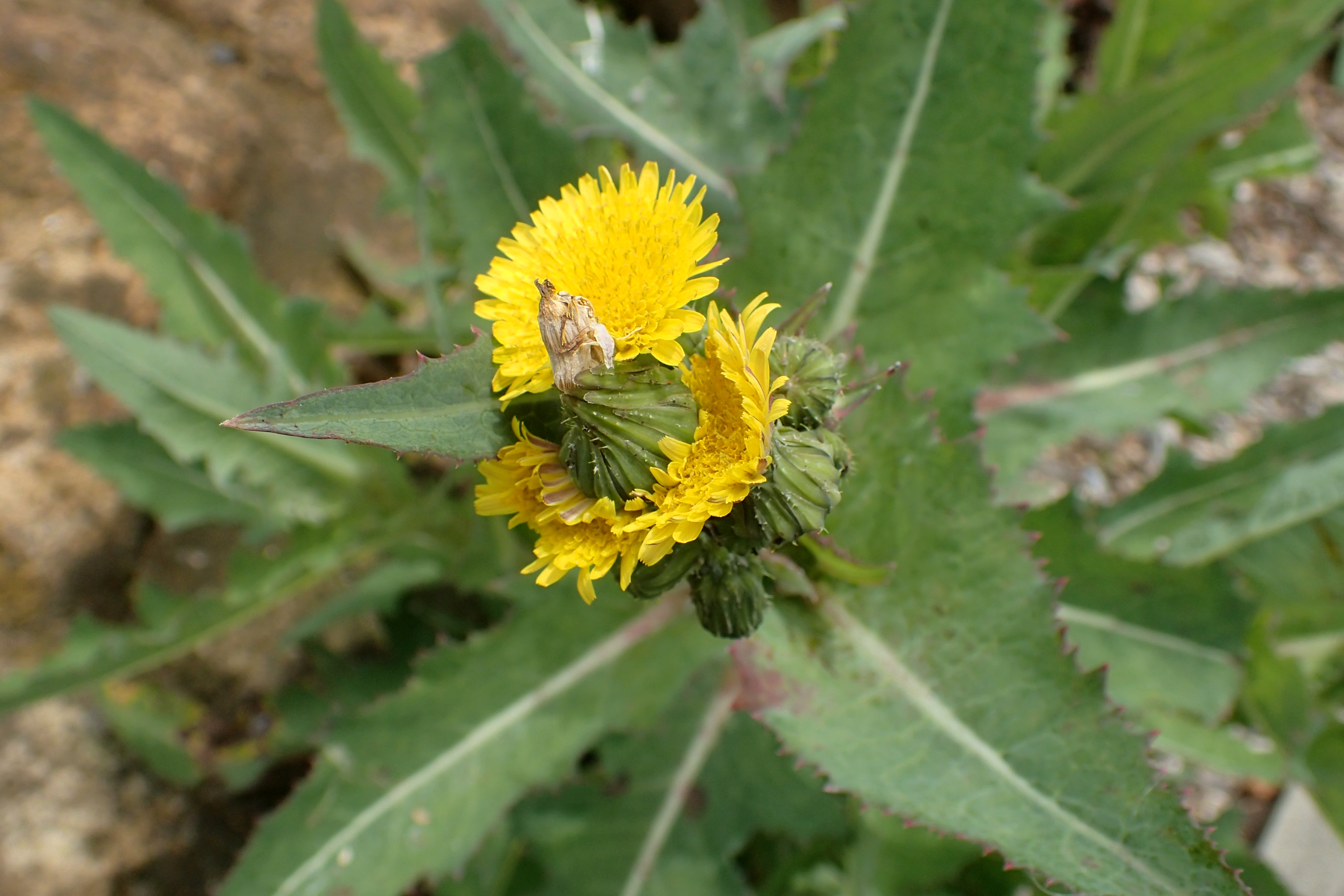

Conservation status
- Declining (NZ TCS)

Scientific classification
- Kingdom: Plantae
- Clade: Tracheophytes
- Clade: Angiosperms
- Clade: Eudicots
- Clade: Asterids
- Order: Asterales
- Family: Asteraceae
- Genus: Sonchus
- Species: S. kirkii

Binomial name
- Sonchus kirkii Hamlin

Synonyms
- Sonchus littoralis (Kirk) Allan; Sonchus littoralis (Kirk) Cockayne

= Sonchus kirkii =

Species of flowering plant

Sonchus kirkii, also known as New Zealand sow thistle, or shore puha is a herb in the Asteraceae family. It grows in coastal New Zealand.

== Appearance ==
The shore puha has green leaves extending upwards with spiky sides. On the top is a yellow flower. The shore puha can grow up to 15–30 centimeters (6–12 in) tall. Occasionally it grows up to 100 centimeters (39 in).

== Conservation status ==
The conservation status of the shore puha is currently at "declining" and its umbrella category is "at risk".

=== Threats ===
Other species of Sow thistles that grow faster may be the reason for the shore puha to be at a declining status as it is outcompeted. The sowthistles Sonchus asper and Sonchus oleraceus can take over the habitats that the shore puha prefer and colonizing the area quicker. Up until the mid-1980s the shore puha was common, but since then its numbers have been declining.

== Maori use and Chinese market gardens ==
Market gardeners among New Zealand's Chinese community grew puha for their own consumption. It was a staple of the Māori diet and often grew wild in market gardens.

== Other names ==
- pūhā, also applied to Sonchus oleraceus
- puha
- puwha (Māori)
- raurōroa

== Gallery ==
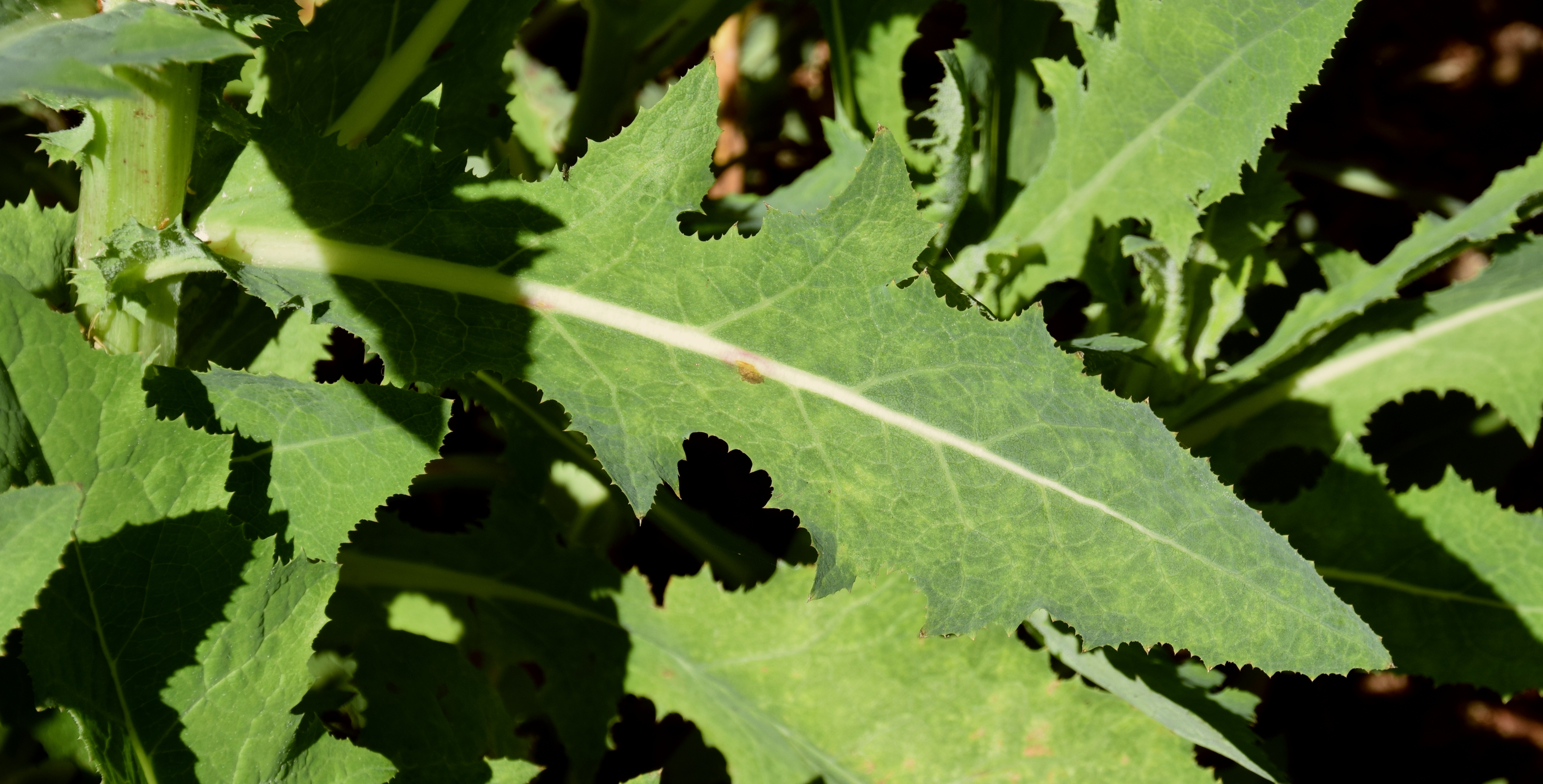
The shore puha or Sonchus kirkii in the Dunedin Botanic Garden, Dunedin, New Zealand

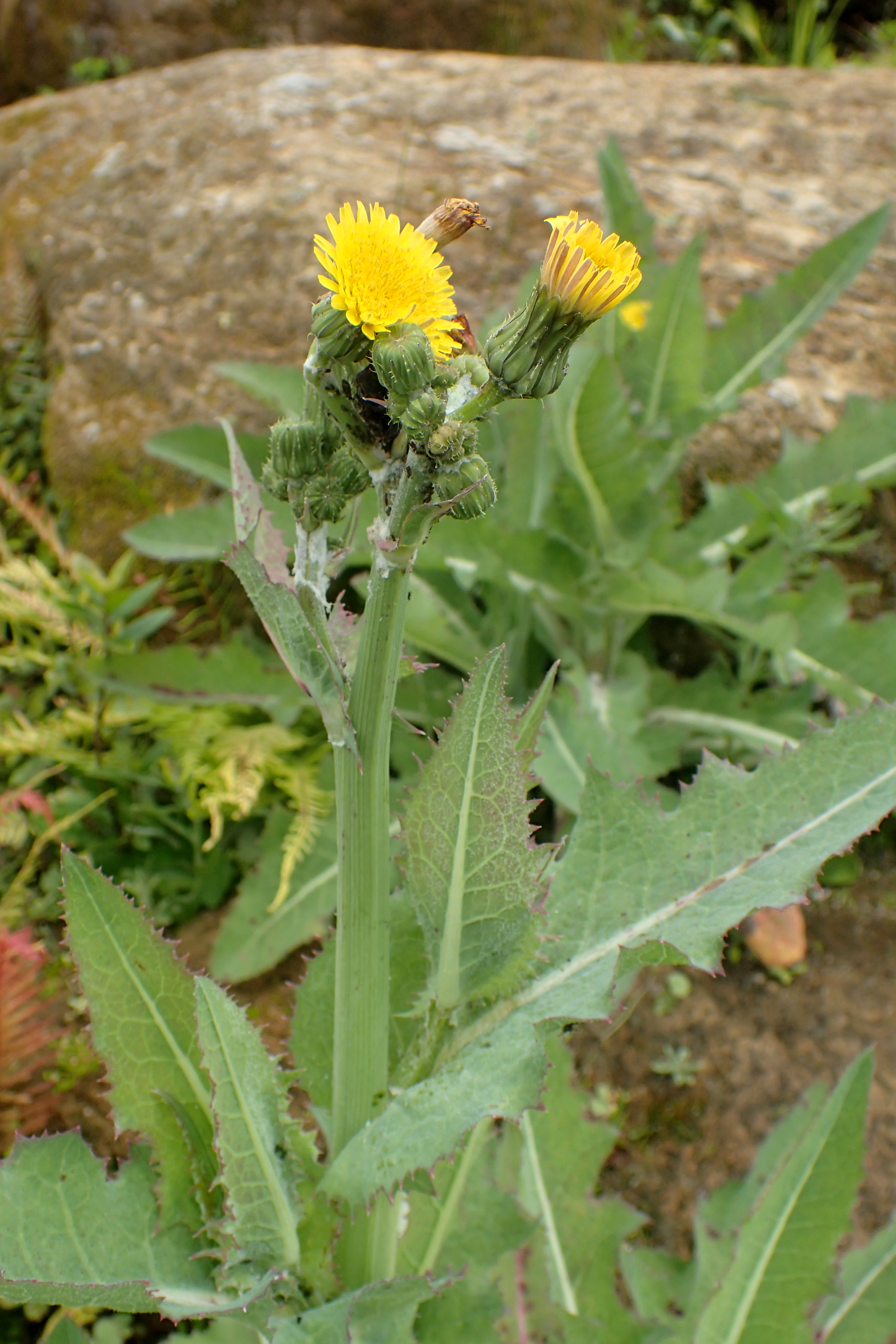
Sonchus kirkii in the Auckland Botanic Gardens, New Zealand
