= Henry Douglas Morpeth Haszard =

New Zealand surveyor and land commissioner

Henry Douglas Morpeth Haszard (16 January 1862 – 19 September 1938) was a New Zealand surveyor and land commissioner. He was born in Mangonui, Northland, New Zealand on 16 January 1862.
