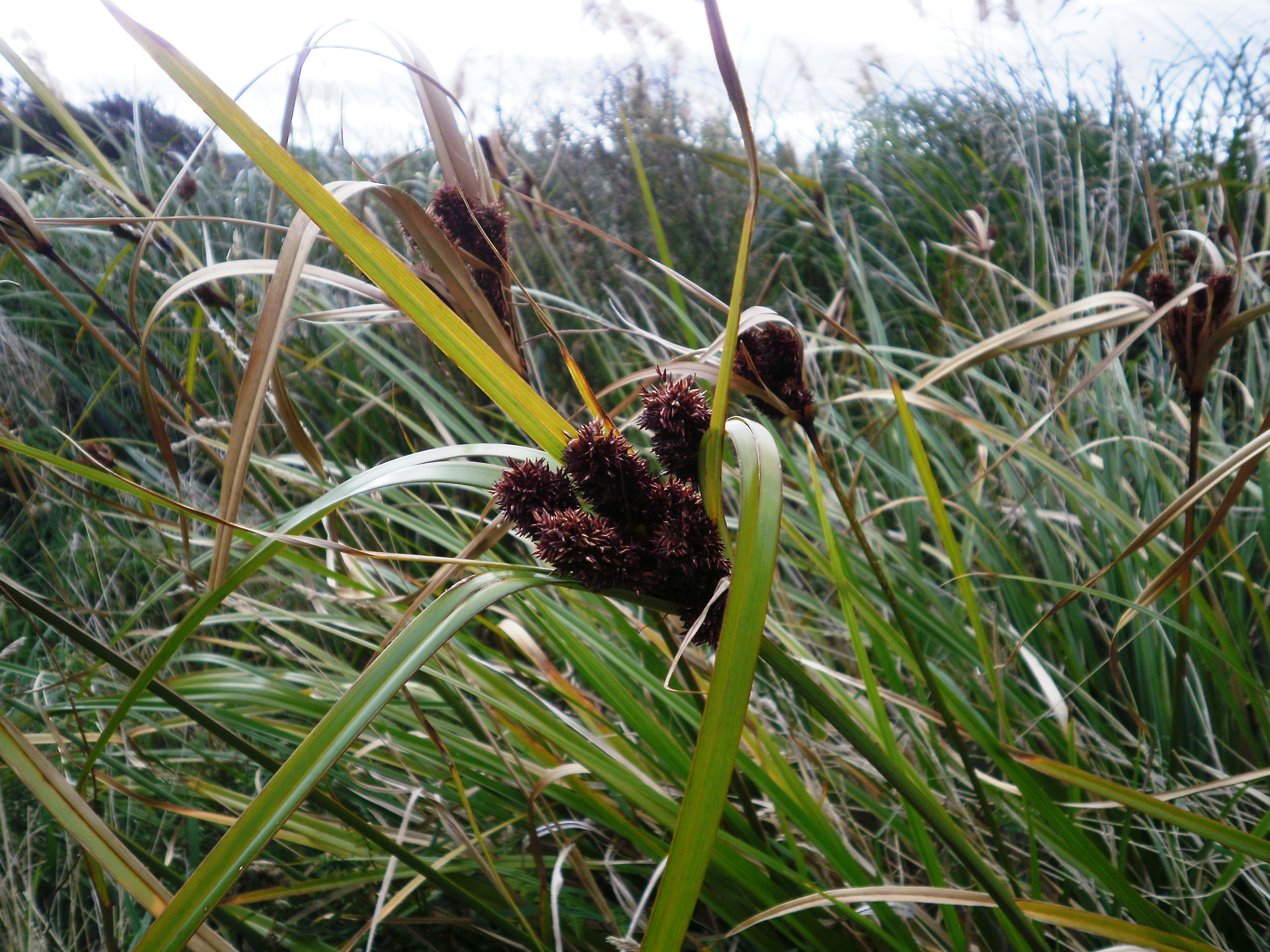

Scientific classification
- Kingdom: Plantae
- Clade: Tracheophytes
- Clade: Angiosperms
- Clade: Monocots
- Clade: Commelinids
- Order: Poales
- Family: Cyperaceae
- Genus: Cyperus
- Species: C. ustulatus

Binomial name
- Cyperus ustulatus A.Rich.

Synonyms
- Mariscus ustulatus (A.Rich.) C.B.Clarke; Cyperus ustulatus f. grandispiculosus Kük.

= Cyperus ustulatus =

giant umbrella-sedge

Species of plant

Cyperus ustulatus, also known as giant umbrella-sedge or coastal cutty grass is a species of sedge native to New Zealand. C. ustulatus generally grows in coastal or lowland areas near water in the North Island and on the Kermadec Islands.

The leaves are wide, shiny and folded. It produces long, dark brown seed heads after flowering in summer. The seed heads are held by a cluster of leaves at the top of the plant.

The Māori name for the plant is toetoe upoko-tangata. The word toetoe by itself generally refers to Austroderia which are in Poaceae, a different family. Alongside cattails (Typha orientalis, called raupō in the Māori language), it was a material used in traditional Māori kite-making.

== See also ==
- List of Cyperus species
