= Tonga Trench =

Deepest oceanic trench in the southwestern Pacific Ocean

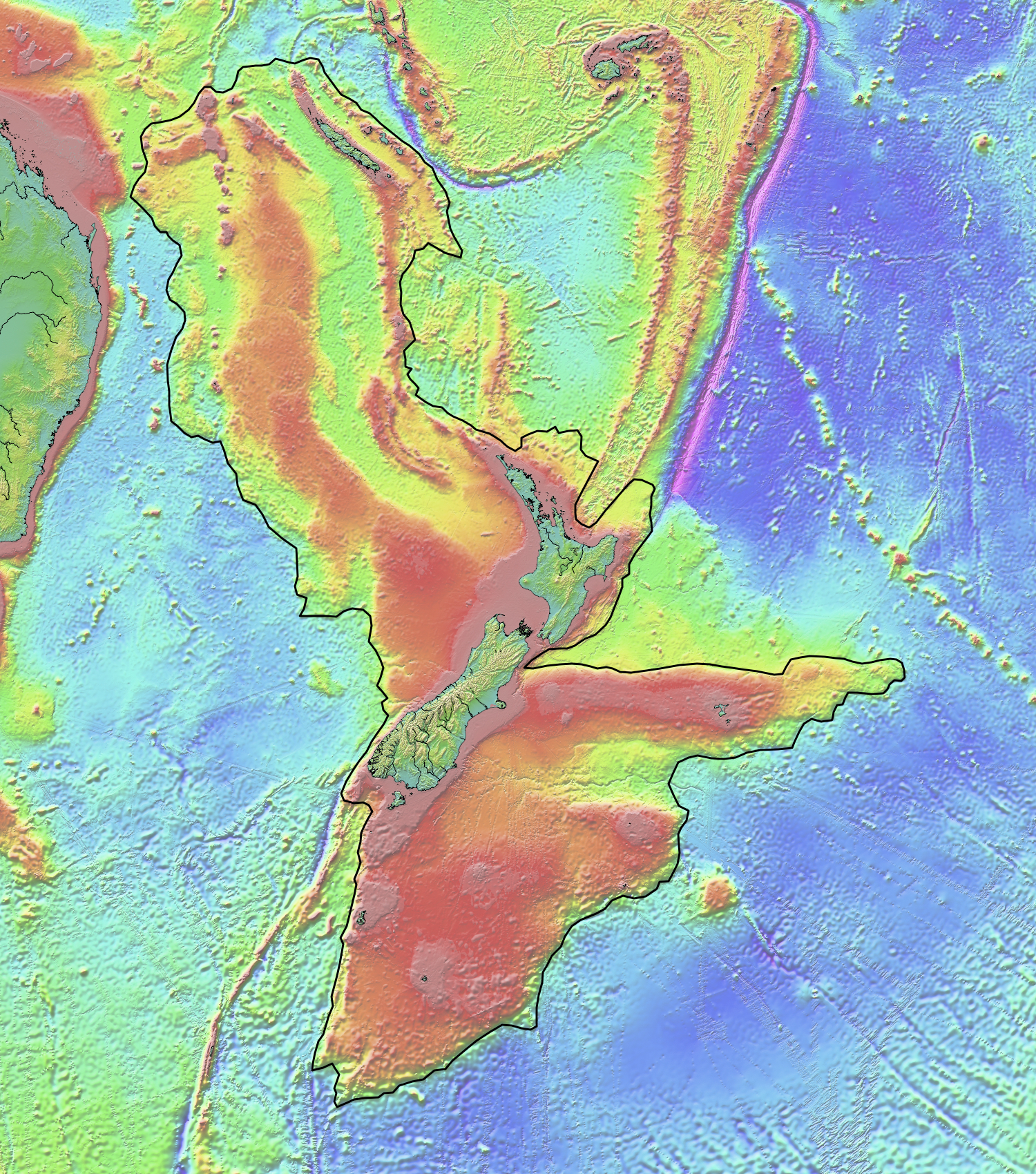
The major geological relationships of the Tonga Trench (violet) which to the south becomes the Kermadec Trench (violet) at the Osbourn Trough and Louisville Ridge intersection. Blue represents ocean depths of a kilometer or so and brown shades are shallower. Land is shown in dark green and the black line delineates the continent of Zealandia.

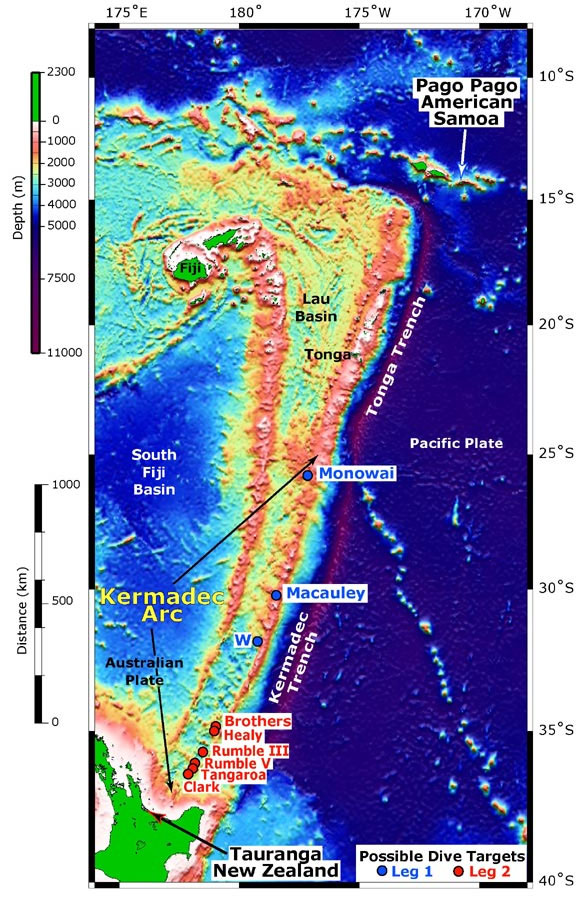
The Tonga Trench constitutes the northern half of the Tonga-Kermadec subduction system, which extends 2,550 km (1,580 mi) between New Zealand and Tonga.

The Tonga Trench is an oceanic trench located in the southwestern Pacific Ocean. It is the deepest trench in the Southern hemisphere and the second deepest on Earth after the Mariana Trench. The fastest plate-tectonic velocity on Earth is occurring at this location, as the Pacific plate is being subducted westward in the trench.

== Horizon Deep ==
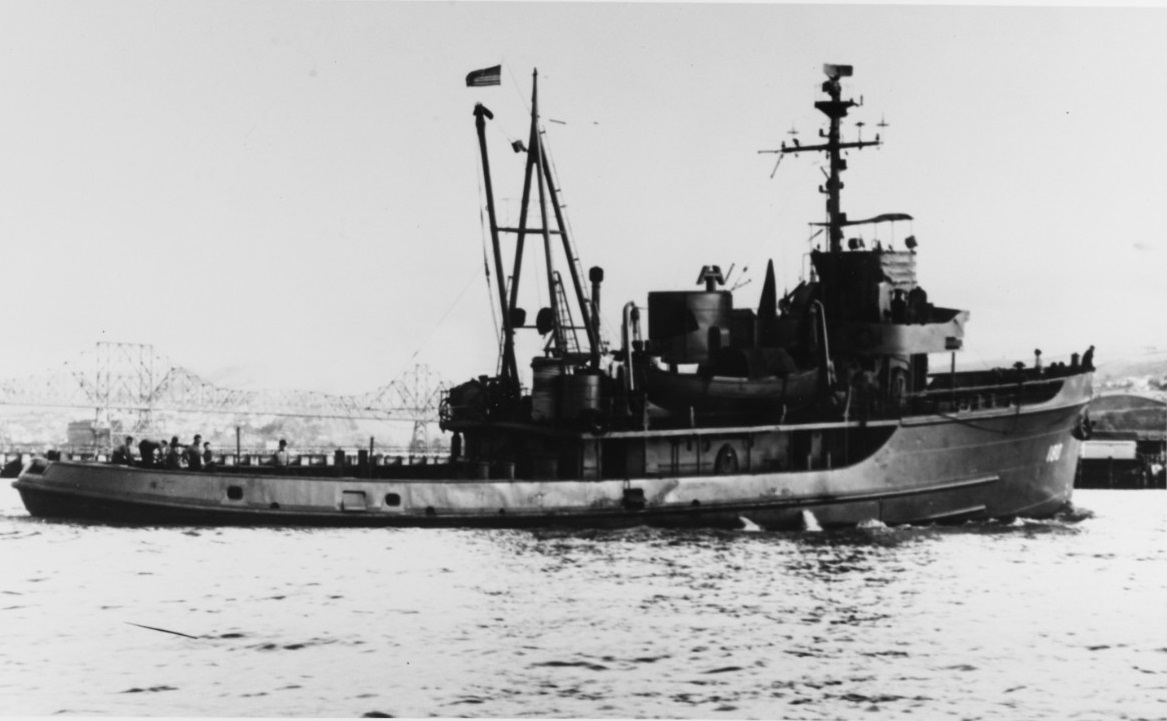
RV Horizon (1948), used as Auxiliary Fleet Tug USS ATA-180

The deepest point of the Tonga Trench, the Horizon Deep at 23.25833°S 174.726667°W, is 10,800 ± 10 m (35,433 ± 33 ft) deep, making it the deepest point in the Southern Hemisphere and the second deepest on Earth after the Challenger Deep in the Mariana Trench. It is named for the research vessel Horizon of the Scripps Institution of Oceanography, the crew of which found the deep in December 1952.

As one of the deepest hadal trenches, the sediment of the Horizon Deep harbours a community of roundworms. A 2016 study found that the abundance of individuals in this community is six times greater than it is at a site on the trench edge at approximately 6,250 m (20,510 ft) near the deep and that the difference in biomass between these locations is even bigger. Species diversity, on the other hand, is twice as big on the trench slope, probably because of a small number of opportunistic species in the trench. Figures for abundance and biomass are similar for the deeps of the Mariana Trench but considerably lower in the Peru–Chile Trench.

=== Crewed descent ===
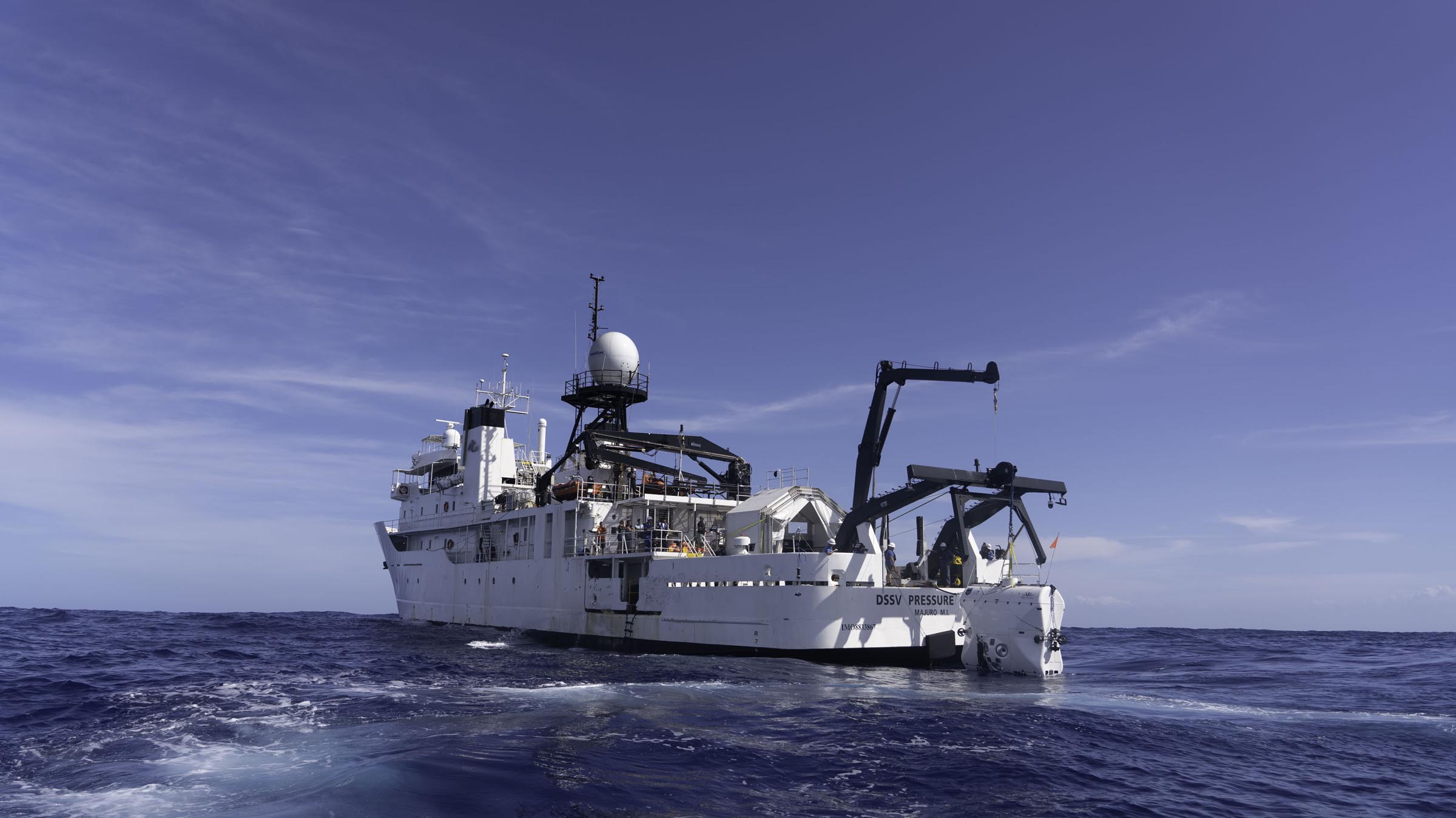
Deep Submersible Support Vessel DSSV Pressure Drop and DSV Limiting Factor at its stern

The Tonga Trench and the operating area was surveyed by a support ship, the Deep Submersible Support Vessel DSSV Pressure Drop, with a Kongsberg SIMRAD EM124 multibeam echosounder system. The gathered data will be donated to the GEBCO Seabed 2030 initiative. The dive was part of the Five Deeps Expedition. The objective of this expedition is to thoroughly map and visit the deepest points of all five of the world's oceans by the end of September 2019.

Horizon Deep was visited by Victor Vescovo on the first crewed descent to its bottom on 10 June 2019 in the Deep-Submergence Vehicle DSV Limiting Factor, a Triton 36000/2 model submersible. A depth of 10,823 ± 10 m (35,509 ± 33 ft) was obtained by direct CTD pressure measurements, hence confirming its status as the second deepest point on the planet and the deepest in the Southern Hemisphere.

== Geology ==
=== Tonga-Kermadec arc system ===
The region between the Tonga trench and the Lau back-arc basin, the Tonga-Kermadec Ridge, moves independently from the Australian and Pacific plates and is subdivided into several small plates, the Tonga, Kermadec, and Niuafo'ou plates. The Tonga plate is facing the Tonga Trench.

The Tonga Trench-Arc system is an extension-dominated, non-accretionary convergent margin. The Pacific plate is being subducted westward in the trench. The convergence rate has been estimated to 15 cm/year (5.9 in/year) but GPS measurements in the northern trench indicate a convergence rate of 24 cm/year (9.4 in/year) there. This is the fastest plate velocity on Earth, a result is the earth's most active zone of mantle seismicity. Subduction rates decrease southward along the Tonga-Kermadec Arc, from 24 cm/year (9.4 in/year) in the north to 6 cm/year (2.4 in/year) in the south and also become more oblique southward. The high rate in the Tonga Trench is largely due to a reduction in extension in the Lau Basin. Crustal extension in the Miocene Lau-Colville Ridge began at 6 Ma which initiated the opening of the Lau Basin-Havre Trough. This extension has propagated southward since and has developed into a spreading centre in the Lau Basin in front of the Tonga Trench. New crust is thus produced in front of the Tonga-Kermadec trenches while old crust is consumed behind it in the Tonga Trench.

==== Pacific slab avalanche ====
While most of the large earthquakes occur at the contact zone between both tectonic plates, related to the friction during subduction, others are produced in the Pacific plate due to its bending. The Pacific crust that descends into the trench is old, 100–140 Ma, and relatively cold and it can therefore store a lot of elastic energy. As it reaches deep into the mantle, more than 600 km (370 mi), and encounters barriers, it is being contorted, which produces deep mantle earthquakes.

About 500 km (310 mi) beneath the North Fiji Basin, a detached segment of the subducted Australian plate has collided with the subducted Pacific plate which produces many large-scale earthquakes. The subducted Pacific plate is also being deformed in the collision as both slabs settle on the 660 km discontinuity. This slab collision probably occurred 5–4 Ma when the Lau Basin started to open.

Oceanic trenches are important sites for the formation of what will become continental crust and for recycling of material back into the mantle. Along the Tonga Trench mantle-derived melts are transferred to the island arc systems, and abyssal oceanic sediments and fragments of oceanic crust are collected.

=== Tonga Trench–Lau Basin transition ===
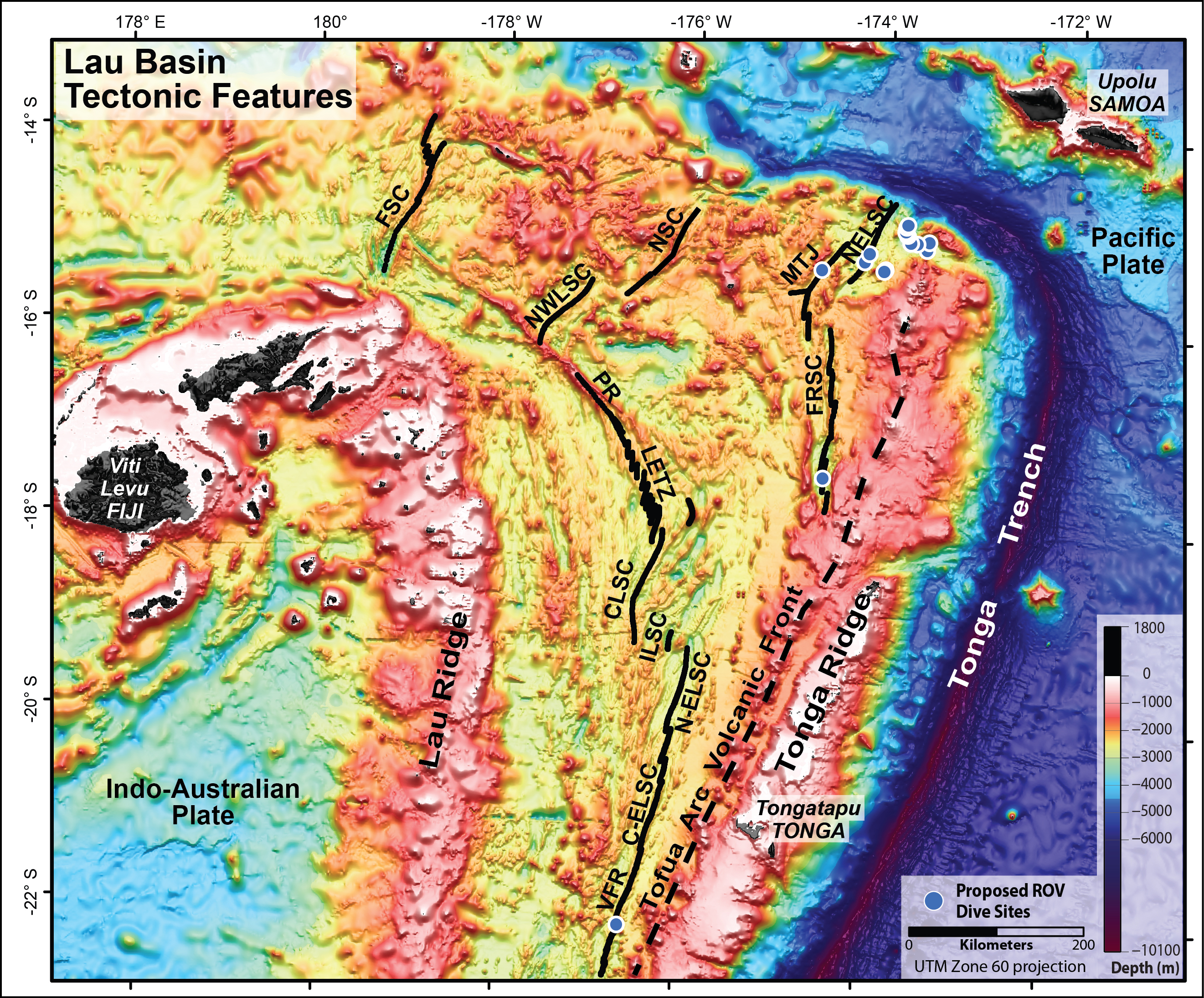
At its northern end the Tonga Trench bends west into the microplates, interconnected spreading centres, and deformation zones of the Lau Basin. But the Tonga Trench also has a continuation in the inactive Vitiaz Trench (north of map area) with which it formed a single continuous trench before the opening of the North Fiji Basin (west of map area). The Capricorn Seamount (centre right) is sitting on the eastern slope of the trench.

The northern end of the Tonga Trench (at 15°10'S) is probably linked to the Fiji fracture zone, trending east–west north of Fiji, but the trench ends in a complex transition from subduction to a strike-slip motion and seismicity patterns indicate a presence of a c. 100 km-broad (62 mi) transition zone rather than a simple transform fault. In or near this zone there is a ridge-ridge-ridge triple junction (15°37′S 174°52′W), known as the King's or Mangatolu triple junction (MTJ), characterised by deformation and recent and intense volcanism (see for example Home Reef). The Tofua volcanic arc on the northern Tonga Ridge extends to less than 40 km (25 mi) of the trench's northern end.

Just north of the MTJ lies the south–north-trending Northeast Lau Spreading Centre (NELSC) which intercepts the northern end of the Tonga Trench and is one of three major spreading centres in the northern Lau Basin (together with the Futuna Spreading Centre and Northwest Lau Spreading Centre). The maximum spreading rate in the NELSC is 94 mm/a (3.7 in/year) but spreading decreases to zero at either end of the spreading centre. The total spreading rate between the Tongan and Australian plates, however, is 157 mm/a (6.2 in/year), and additional microplates and/or deformations zones must thus exist. The NELSC probably receives magmatic contributions from the Samoa hotspot. The NELSC has a morphology which is similar to those of slow-spreading ridges with many closely packed ridges and troughs reaches. Where it meets the trench, a ridge-transform-transform boundary is developing between the Tonga Ridge, the Pacific plate, and the Australian plate.

North-east of the 60° bend in the Tonga Trench the Pacific seafloor is full of parallel lineations. These have been interpreted as remnants of an extinct, east-to-west-trending spreading centre on the Pacific plate, much older than the Tonga Trench.

=== Louisville Seamount Chain collision ===
At its southern end (c. 26°S) the Tonga Trench is colliding with the Louisville Seamount Chain, a chain of guyots and seamounts on the Pacific plate roughly parallel to the Hawaiian–Emperor seamount chain in the northern pacific. The Louisville collision zone migrates southward at a rate of 18 cm/year (7.1 in/year) because of the difference in the oblique angle between the Louisville Ridge relative the direction of convergence. In the eastern Lau Basin spreading centres are propagating southward at roughly the same rate. The collision zone also offsets the Tonga Trench to the north-west relative to the Kermadec Trench by c. 50 km (31 mi). The subducting Louisville Ridge has caused a significant amount of erosion on the outer edge of the southern Tonga fore-arc and has probably accelerated subsidence in the Tonga Trench, a process which makes the Tonga Trench the second deepest trench on Earth and considerably deeper than the Kermadec Trench.

The oldest and westernmost of the Louisville seamounts, the Osbourn Seamount, is sitting on the edge of the trench and its former flat top is currently tilting towards the trench. West of the Osbourn Seamount a broad zone of faulted blocks shallows the trench by 3,000 m (9,800 ft) while the adjacent fore-arc is elevated by c. 300 m (980 ft) and covered by canyons.

The Louisville collision zone correlates with a zone of seismic quiescence along the Tonga-Kermadec Trench known as the "Louisville Gap". This gap in seismicity indicates that subducting seamounts inhibit or even prevent seismicity at subduction zones, perhaps by increasing intervals between earthquakes, but the mechanism behind this process is poorly understood.

Geochemical evidence suggests that the Louisville chain has been subducting under the Tonga-Kermadec Arc since 4 Ma. Seismic studies have identified a southward, along-arc mantle flow that indicate that Pacific mantle is being replaced by Indo-Australian mantle west of the Tonga Trench.

=== Osbourn Trough ===
The Osbourn Trough, located at 25.5°S just north of the Louisville Ridge collision zone, is a 900-kilometre-long (560-mile) extinct spreading ridge midway between two large oceanic plateaux north and south of the Tonga Trench respectively: Manihiki 1,750 km (1,090 mi) to the north and Hikurangi 1,550 km (960 mi) to the south. These plateaux once formed part of the 100×10^{6} km^{3} (3.5×10^{18} ft^{3}) Ontong Java-Manihiki-Hikurangi large igneous province (LIP). Spreading between the plateaux ceased when Hikurangi collided with the Chatham Rise east of New Zealand which had been estimated to have been at 86 Ma, although may be as recent as 79 Ma. The western end of the Osbourn Trough is bounded by the Tonga Trench and its eastern by the Wishbone–East Manihiki scarp. In between the Osbourn Trough is divided into three segments separated by dextral offsets. Near the Tonga Trench the bathymetry of these structures is affected by the rotation of the Pacific plate.

=== Capricorn Seamount ===
The Capricorn Seamount is a guyot located on the eastern wall of the northern Tonga Trench (see map above). It is a large guyot, 100 km (62 mi) wide at its base with a small part of its reefal or lagoonal summit reaching 440 m (1,440 ft) below sea level. The bending of the Pacific plate at the Tonga Trench is currently slicing it like a loaf of bread: inside the guyot a north–south-trending horst and graben system is developing parallel to the trench; the western slope of the guyot has reached the 9,000 m deep (30,000 ft) trench and has started to fill it; the summit of the guyot is tilted 1.7° towards the trench and its centre is only 45 km (28 mi) from the trench axis. The Capricorn Seamount is expected to be completely consumed by the trench within 500,000 years.

== Apollo 13 ==
When the Apollo 13 mission was aborted in 1970 following an explosion in an oxygen tank, it had to bring the entire Lunar Module back to Earth. As the LEM was jettisoned prior to reentry, its radioisotope thermoelectric generator broke up in the atmosphere, and the heat source plunged into an area of the Pacific Ocean that is either in or near the Tonga Trench. However, due to protective casing, no release of ^{238}Pu (half-life of 87.7 years) used as heat source in the thermoelectric generator could be detected by atmospheric and oceanic monitoring.

== See also ==
- Geology of the Pacific Ocean
- List of submarine topographical features
