= Osbourn Trough =

Deep oceanic basin in the southwestern Pacific Ocean

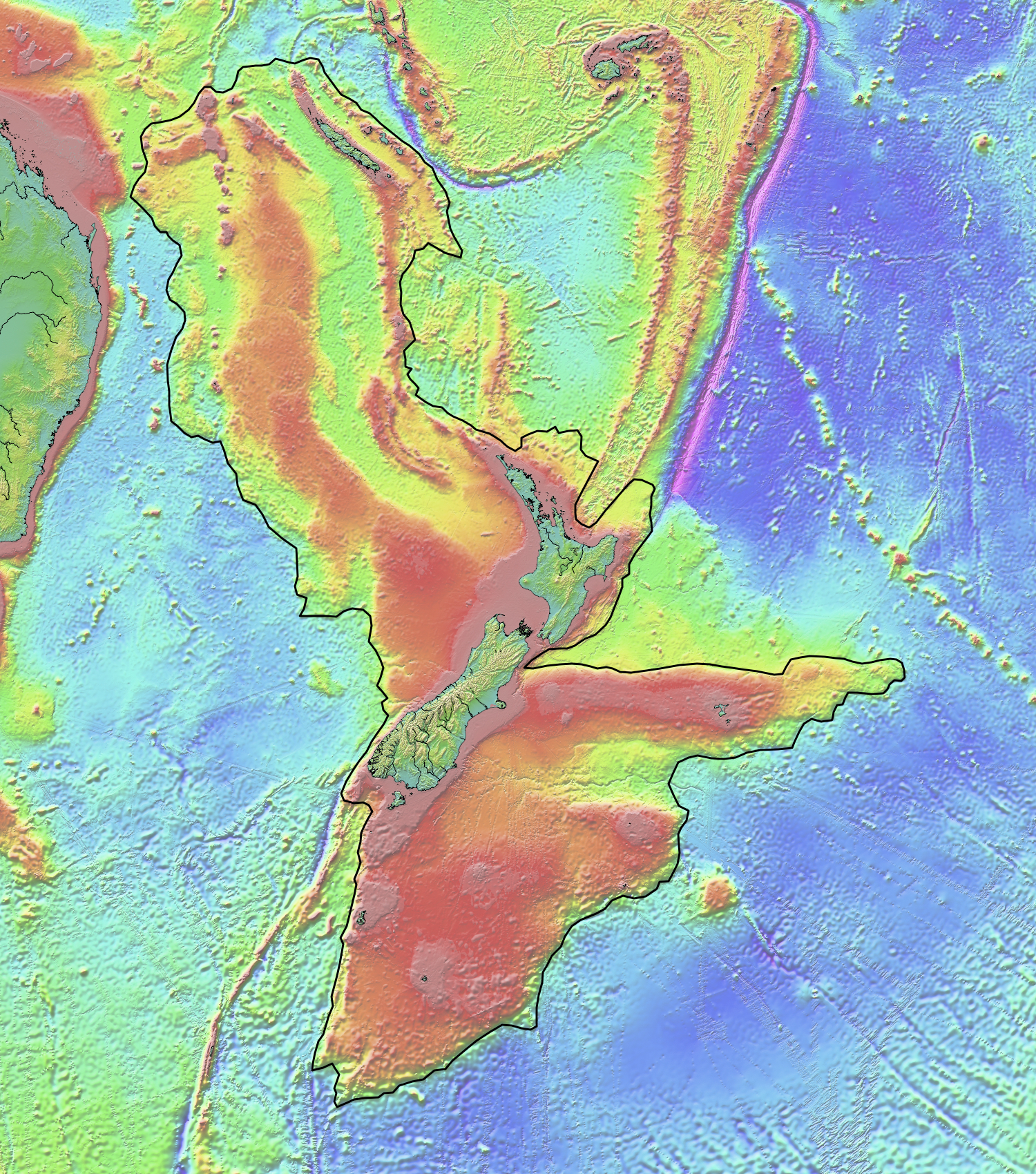
The major geological relationships of the Osbourn Trough. It defines with the Louisville Ridge intersection the Tonga Trench (violet) to the north and the Kermadec Trench (violet) to the south. Blue represents ocean depths of a kilometer or so and brown shades are shallower. Land is shown in dark green. The black line delineates the continent of Zealandia.

The Osbourn Trough, is a 900 km (560 mi)-long extinct mid-ocean ridge, that may have stopped spreading as recently as 79 million years ago. It is a west-to-east oriented sea floor feature, located to the east of the present Tonga-Kermadec Ridge where the present Pacific Plate is undergoing subduction under a micro-plate of the Australian Plate. The Osbourn Trough is key to understanding the postulated breakup mechanism of the historic massive Ontong Java-Manihiki-Hikurangi large igneous province (LIP), as it has been shown to be the spreading centre that lead to the separation of the Manihiki Plateau to its north and the Hikurangi Plateau to its south close to New Zealand.

== Geology ==
Its basement is known to be oceanic basaltic crust with compositional affinity with a Pacific mid-ocean ridge basalt ( MORB ) mantle source. There is only relatively thin sediment overlay to this, often less than 70 m (230 ft) thick. The ocean depth ranges between 4 km (2.5 mi) to 6 km (3.7 mi) over the trough which has been characterised as having at least three segments, each of which has an axial valley up to 15 km (9.3 mi) wide bounded by ridges up to 500 m (1,600 ft) high. Its south western aspect intersects and helps separate geographically the very deep Tonga Trench to the north from the Kermadec Trench which is also where presently the Louisville Ridge at the Osbourn Seamount is subducting under the Kermadec Plate. It is located at about near 26°S about midway between the two large oceanic plateau. The Manihiki Plateau is now 1,750 km (1,090 mi) to the north and to its south is the Hikurangi Plateau, 1,550 km (960 mi) away, near New Zealand. To the east the trough finishes at the Wishbone–East Manihiki scarp. The Osbourn Trough was active during the period of the Cretaceous Normal Superchron ( C34 normal magnetic polarity period, Chron 34n ) which lasted for almost 40 million years. This means that the trough has uniform magnetic polarity unlike most spreading centres which have evidence of geomagnetic reversal in parallel to the axis of the spreading ridge. Further the Osbourn Trough is a more prominent feature in gravity anomaly studies than in bathymetric data. This uniformity over such a large area of ocean floor lead to its first description as a possible spreading center in 1997 and means spreading stopped by end of the Chron 34n. The Glomar Challenger had surveyed part of the area by 1987 but the global magnetism data was not available to allow an understanding that a large undersea feature existed.

== Tectonics ==
The precise timing of the Osbourn Trough formation has been a matter of some debate as it is important to dating geological events in the South Pacific region, in particular subduction cessation. The first rifting must have occurred prior to 115 million years ago. The spreading took place over about 21 million years and resulted in between 1,500 km (930 mi) to 2,000 km (1,200 mi) of plate convergence along the Hikurangi Plate and the Gondwana margin to its south. In the current best fit Pacific Plate reference frame tectonics model the Osborne Trough is modelled as a spreading centre between the Manihiki Plate and the Hikurangi Plate which later when spreading ceased became fixed components of today's Pacific Plate. Spreading between the Manihiki and Hikurangi Plateau ceased when Hikurangi LIP collided with the Chatham Rise east of New Zealand and this event, which must have been no more distant in time than 101 million years ago, has been dated at 86 million years ago, but is now with Pacific Plate reference frame modelling believed to be up to 7 million years more recent.

== See also ==
- Wishbone scarp
- Tonga Trench
- Manihiki Plateau
- Hikurangi Plateau
