= Wishbone scarp =

Feature of the Pacific Ocean floor

- West Wishbone scarp, Western Wishbone Ridge, East Wishbone scarp, Eastern Wishbone Ridge, Wishbone–East Manihiki scarp
- Surface projection of Wishbone scarp (black) to show position relative to nearby land
- Coordinates: 31.36°S 164.81°W (extends at least from 29°28'S to 41°32'S)

Characteristics
- Top depth: 2,930 metres (9,613 ft)
- Part of: Oceanic Pacific plate
- Length: Over 1,400 km (870 mi)

Tectonics
- Plate: Pacific plate
- Earthquakes: Inactive
- Age: 116–71 Ma

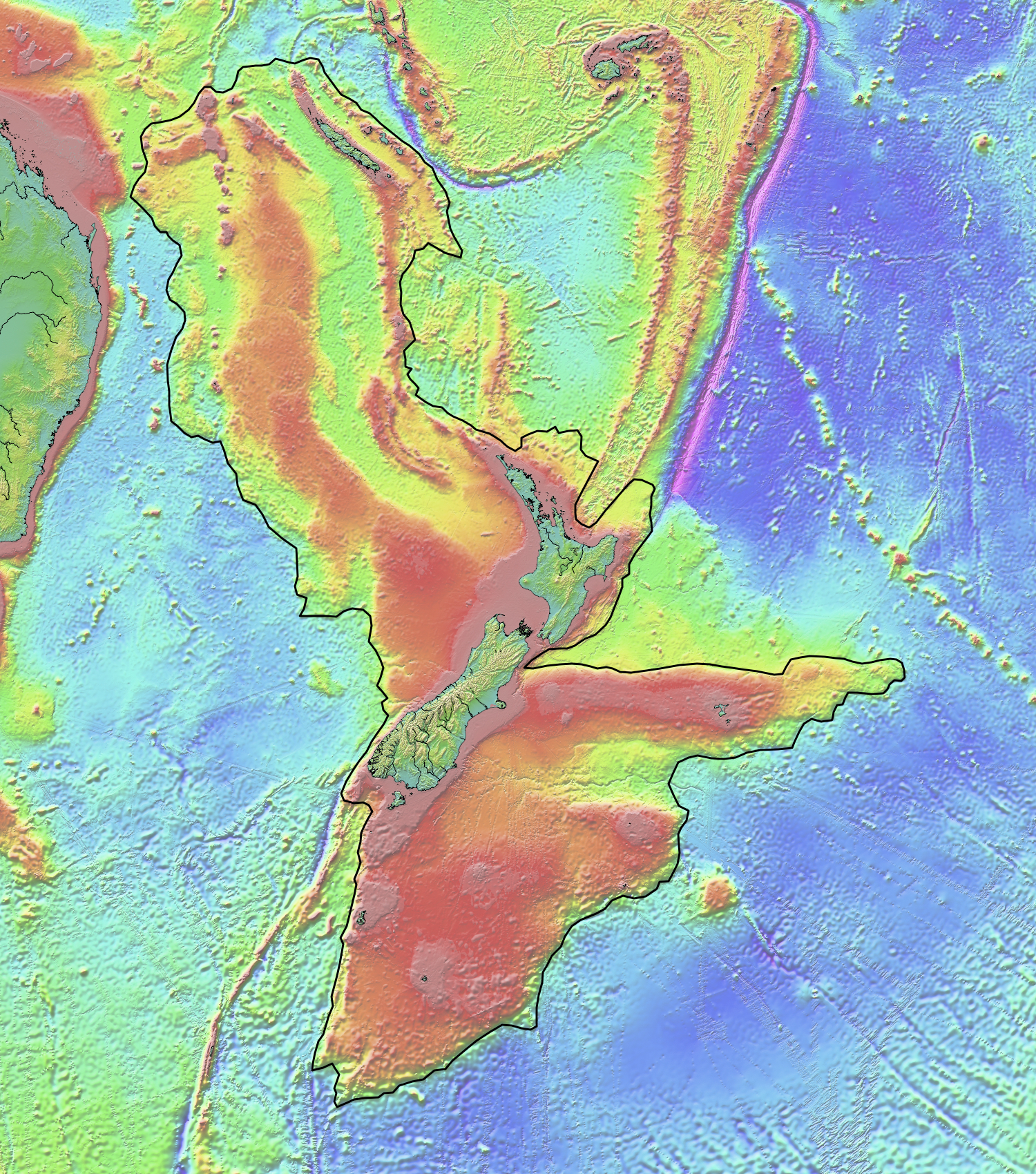
The scarps associated with the Wishbone Scarp are labelled on this ocean floor map that shows features relevant to the eastern margins (black outline) of the subcontinent of Zealandia. The diagonal chain of the Louisville seamounts crosses the western scarp at almost right angles. The violet line is the very deep trenches of the Kermadec-Tonga subduction zone with its arc volcanoes to the top left. Blue represents ocean depths of a kilometer or so and brown shades are shallower.

The Wishbone scarp is a Pacific Ocean floor feature in the oceanic crust, that if were on land would be similar to a mountain range fault system over 1,000 km (620 mi) long. It commences in the north near the Osbourn Trough, although it is likely to be related tectonically to the Manihiki scarp somewhat to its north. To the south it splits into west and east scarps that have been intercepted by the Louisville hotspot, with the West Wishbone scarp continuing until it intercepts the Chatham Rise. There is now evidence that the entire scarp has a fracture-zone origin, resolving previous uncertainty on this issue.

To the east of the eastern scarp are the very deep Pacific mid-ocean basins, while to the west of the western scarp is the shallower but currently very tectonically active Hikurangi Margin.

== Geology ==
To its north it can be related to the Manihiki Plateau, which has a water depth of 2.5–3.0 km (1.6–1.9 mi), and with the East Manihiki scarp. The East Manihiki scarp is a ridge that is raises up to 600 m (2,000 ft) above the Manihiki Plateau and descends to its east at least 2 km (1.2 mi) to the Penryhn Basin. The Manihiki scarp is usually interpreted as a continuation of the Wishbone scarp, so the name Wishbone–East Manihiki scarp has been sometimes used.

The Wishbone scarp divides north of the Louisville Ridge at about 32°S into an eastern branch that continues the essentially north-south orientation (163°) and a western branch that trends southwest. These two branches mean the total trace length of the scarp structure is over 2,000 km (1,200 mi). Both pass through the Louisville hotspot chain, and in so doing lose some continuity, but the western Wishbone scarp can be mapped all the way to the continental crust of the northeast Chatham Rise. The Louisville Ridge seamounts show no compositional change as they cross the scarps but the East Wishbone scarp crossing point is associated with a distinct decrease in the volume of the younger seamount eruptives from that point east into the Pacific plate. Near the Chatham Rise's, subcontinental crust of Zealandia, seismic reflection studies of the West Wishbone scarp shows two to three southeast-facing tilted-block ridges which climb up to the Chatham Rise crest. The oceanic-crust igneous bedrock here, just to the scarp's southeast, is more than 86 million years old. Its composition is similar to those in intraoceanic subduction-zone settings and quite distinct from that of mid-ocean ridges or other intraplate oceanic volcanoes. The scarp in this region can rise up to 1,800 m (5,900 ft) above surrounding sea floor.

The recent definite ability to assign its southern Western Wishbone scarp portion to primarily a dextral strike-slip fault that was active in the Late Cretaceous makes a fracture zone origin more likely for the entire scarp as the Eastern Wishborn scarp had already been characterised as a Cretaceous fracture zone. There were historically several possible tectonic explanations for its structure, with it variously interpreted as related to a former fracture zone, a historic intraoceanic arc, or an inactive spreading center, with it being either a strike-slip plate boundary or a paleo-spreading ridge. The Cretaceous oceanic crust west of the scarps is the southern flank of a historic rise that had the now-inactive Osbourn Trough as its spreading axis.

== Tectonics ==
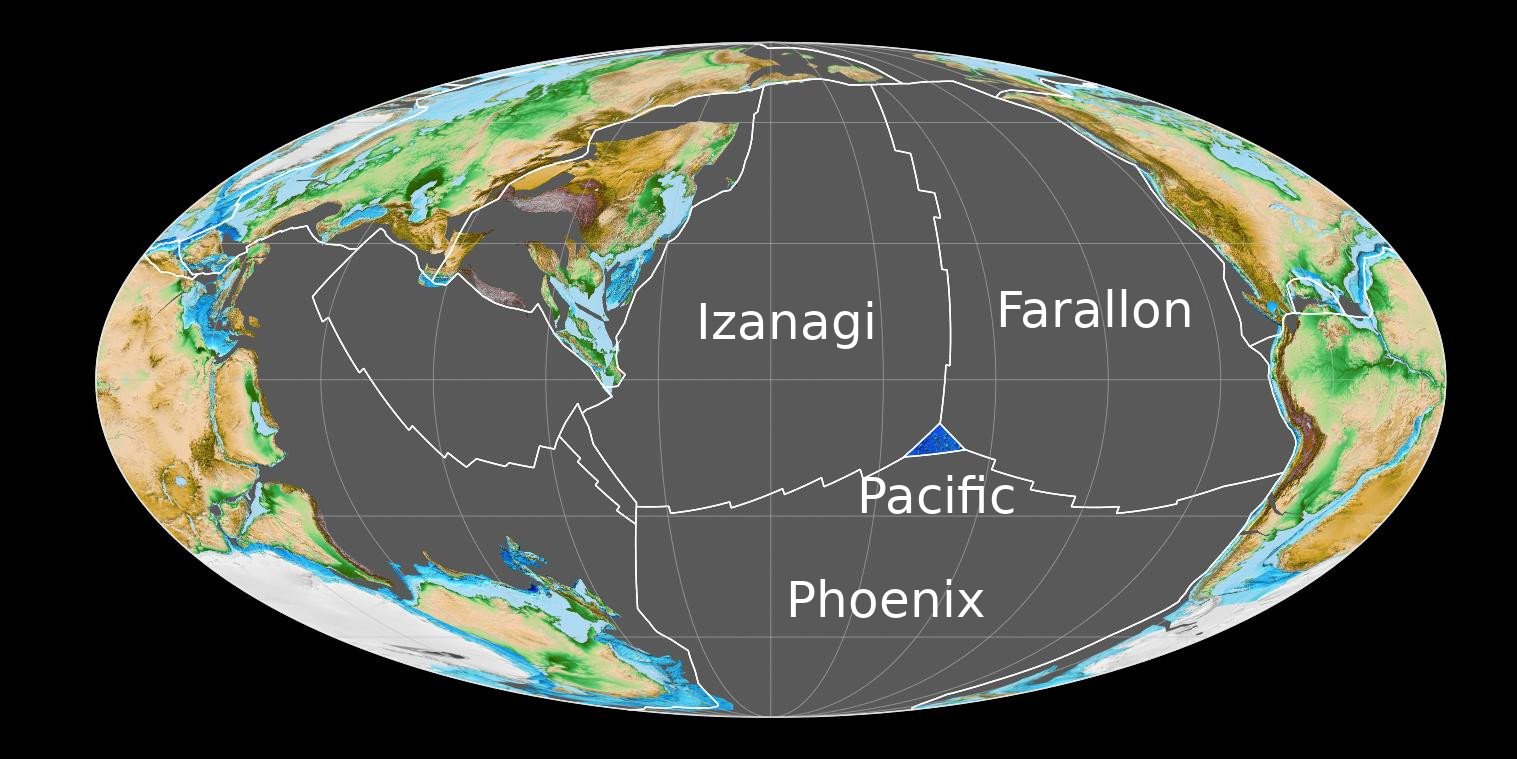
Phoenix plate in context 180 million years ago well before the formation of the Wishbone scarp in what was its southern sector

The breakup of Gondwana, and resulting forces on the former Phoenix plate as the large igneous province of the Ontong Java–Manihiki–Hikurangi plateau split up, with separation into what are now the Manihiki and Hikurangi plateaus, are likely key to the formation of the Wishbone scarp. Rifting about 116 million years ago created the eastern margin of the Manihiki Plateau, the Manihiki Scarp, and separated the Manihiki and Hikurangi plateaus. Associated with this split, an east-west-trending rift system, now inactive, since at least 71 million years ago, but more likely before 84 million years ago, had developed and this is represented by the Osborn Trough in the Pacific sea floor, east of the Kermadec Trench. The Hikurangi Plateau initially subducted under onshore continental crust, but this process stalled between 105 and 100 million years ago, and rotation started to occur, which has led to the present and still-active young geology of New Zealand. The Osborn Trough's eastern end intercepts the definitive northern end of the Wishbone scarp, although it appears related tectonically to the Manihiki scarp to its north. At its southern end, the West Wishbone scarp matches the eastern border of the Hikurangi Plateau, which as part of the continental crust of Zealandia lies east of, and beneath, New Zealand, and the Chatham Rise.

As already has been said, the East Wishbone Ridge had been characterised as a Cretaceous fracture zone as it separated domains of the Pacific plate, and there was fair geological understanding, particularly with regard to crustal age, due to studies along the line of the Louisville hotspot that crossed the East Wishbone scarp at almost right angles.

The gravity signature of the West Wishbone scarp, although fully consistent with a fault zone, looked similar to that of stalled spreading ridges west of the Antarctic Peninsula and in the west Scotia Sea, so it had been suggested that this was a rift valley of such a spreading ridge that stalled outboard of the trench. However, once it was realised that far to the north the Osbourn Trough was an extinct spreading ridge, the geometry did not fit, so this possibility became unlikely. The various different lava compositions along the West Wishbone scarp had raised the possibility that it had a composite history starting out as an intra-oceanic fracture zone prior to 115 million years ago, then became a subduction arc, and more recently a rift system.

Strike-slip motion along the West Wishbone scarp initiated as a consequence of the slowing of spreading at the Osbourn Trough about 105 million years ago. The West Wishbone scarp propagated along the eastern margin of the Hikurangi Plateau in response to this slowing at the same time that spreading continued unabated east of the East Wishbone Ridge. For a period there was short-lived, oblique subduction beneath the southern West Wishbone scarp, but the scarp became tectonically inactive probably at the same time as the cessation of Osbourn Trough spreading.

== See also ==
- Geology of the Pacific Ocean
