= Shatsky Rise =

Oceanic plateau in the north-west Pacific Ocean

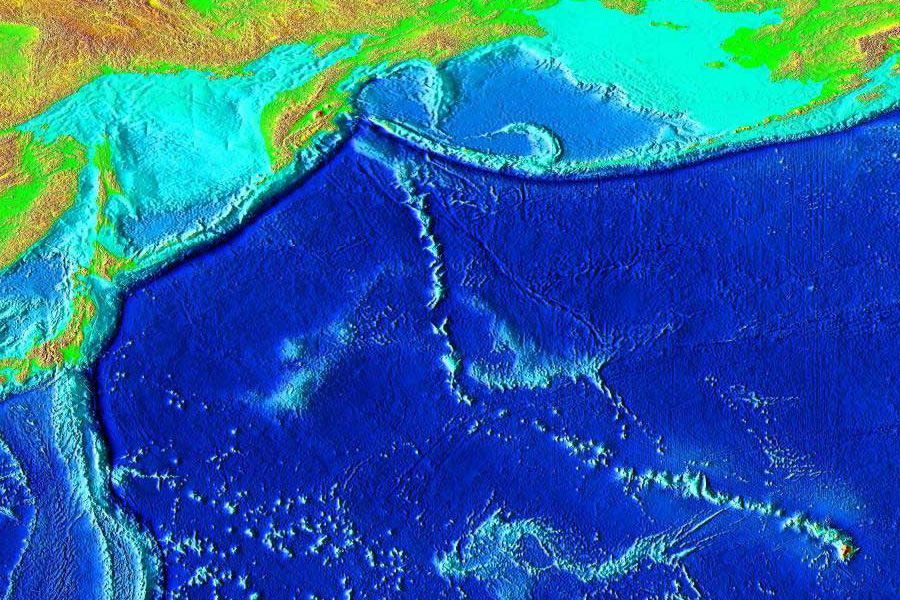
Location of Shatsky Rise

The Shatsky Rise is Earth's third largest oceanic plateau, (after Ontong Java and Kerguelen) located in the north-west Pacific Ocean 1,500 km (930 mi) east of Japan. It is one of a series of Pacific Cretaceous large igneous provinces (LIPs) together with Hess Rise, Magellan Rise, and Ontong Java-Manihiki-Hikurangi. It was named for Nikolay Shatsky (1895-1960), a Soviet geologist, expert in tectonics of ancient platforms.

The rise consists of three large volcanic massifs, Tamu, Ori, and Shirshov, but, in contrast, there are few traces of magmatism on the surrounding ocean floor. Tamu Massif is likely the largest volcano yet discovered on Earth. In 2016, a study found that Tamu Massif covered the entire Shatsky Rise, meaning that the volcano had a surface area of 533,000 square kilometres (206,000 mi^{2}), surpassing Olympus Mons in terms of surface area.

== Extent and volume ==
The central area of the Shatsky Rise is a diagonal plateau that extends from about 32–38° N. and 156–164° E. Including its periphery and the Papanin Ridge, it reaches from about 30–44° N. and 154–168° E. It covers an area that has been estimated to c. 480,000 km^{2} (190,000 sq mi) (roughly the size of California or Sumatra) and a volume of c. 4,300,000 km^{3} (1,000,000 cu mi). Beneath Shatsky rise, however, the Mohorovičić discontinuity (Moho, the mantle-crust boundary) disappears at a depth of 20 km (12 mi) whereas it is normally observed at a depth of 17 km (11 mi). Furthermore, the crustal thickness between the massifs of the Shatsky Rise is almost twice that of normal crust thickness. This considered, the area covered by the rise, assuming the crust was also formed by the Shatsky Rise volcanism, has been estimated to 533,000 km^{2} (206,000 sq mi) and the volume to 6,900,000 km^{3} (1,700,000 cu mi).

== Subsidence ==
After its formation Shatsky Rise was uplifted 2,500–3,500 m (8,200–11,500 ft) and it then subsided 2,600–3,400 m (8,500–11,200 ft), which, in both cases, is considerably more than the Ontong-Java Plateau. There was least subsidence at the centre of the Tamu Massif (c. 2,600 m (8,500 ft)), subsidence increased at the northern flank of the Tamu Massif and at the Ori Massif (c. 3,300 m (10,800 ft)), and it becomes greatest at the flank of Ori Massif. The cause of this gradual increase in subsidence can be underplating beneath Tamu Massif. There was much less subsidence at Shirshov Massif farther north (c. 2,900 m (9,500 ft)) which probably represents a later, different phase of volcanism.

== Origin controversy ==
Scientific studies of the size, shape, and eruption rate of the Shatsky Rise have concluded that the rise originated from a mantle plume, whereas studies of magnetic lineations and plate tectonic reconstructions have shown that it must have originated near a triple junction and drifted up to 2,000 km (1,200 mi) during the Early Cretaceous (140–100 Ma). A 2016 study concluded that the Tamu Massif formed at a mid-ocean ridge that interacted with a plume head and that the Ori Massif formed off-axis probably from a plume tail.

Shatsky Rise formed at a triple junction, but the thickness of the plateau coupled with the depth and intensity of melting is different from those of MORB (mid-ocean ridge basalt), making a recycled mantle slab a more likely source. A decrease in magma volume with time is more consistent with the involvement of a mantle plume.

== Tectonic history ==
It formed during the Late Jurassic and Early Cretaceous at the Pacific–Farallon–Izanagi triple junction, probably making it the oldest unaltered ocean plateau. Because this occurred before the so-called Cretaceous silent period, a long period without magnetic reversals, its formation can be precisely dated. Magnetic lineations on and surrounding Shatsky Rise range from M21 (147 Ma) at the south-western edge to M1 (124 Ma) at the northern tip.

The Shatsky Rise LIP erupted at the location of the Pacific–Farallon–Izanagi triple junction c. 147–143 Ma either because a mantle plume reached the surface or because of decompression melting at a mid-ocean ridge. The eruption coincided with an 800 km (500 mi), nine-stage jump in the location of the triple junction and a configuration change from ridge-ridge-ridge to ridge-ridge-transform.

A set of magnetic lineations, called the Hawaiian lineations, between Shatsky Rise, Hess Rise, and the Mid-Pacific Mountains, formed during the spreading between the Pacific and Farallon plates 156–120 Ma. North of Shatsky Rise the so-called Japanese lineations are oriented in another direction and the differences in orientations trace the path of the Pacific–Farallon–Izanagi triple junction.

The triple junction moved north-west before M22 (150 Ma) after-which it started to reorganise, a microplate formed and the triple junction made an 800 km (500 mi) eastward jump to the oldest part of the rise, the TAMU Massif. The remainder of Shatsky Rise formed before M3 (126 Ma) along the trace of the triple junction. Shaktsky volcanism was episodic and tied to at least nine ridge jumps from this episode.

The volume of the rise decreases along the trace of the triple junction. The TAMU Massif at the southern end has an estimated volume of 2,500,000 km^{3} (600,000 cu mi) whereas both ORI and Shirshov (136 Ma) attained 700,000 km^{3} (170,000 cu mi). Papanin Ridge, the north end of the rise, has a volume of 400,000 km^{3} (96,000 cu mi) but was probably emplaced over a longer period (131–124 Ma).

The conjugates of the Shatsky and Hess rises on the Farallon Plate were most likely involved in the Laramide orogeny; the former subducted beneath North America and the latter below northern Mexico.
