= Magellan Rise (ocean plateau) =

Oceanic plateau in the Pacific Ocean

Coordinates: 07°04.1′N 176°49.5′W

Magellan Rise is an oceanic plateau in the Pacific Ocean, which covers a surface area of 500,000 square kilometres (190,000 sq mi). There is another geological structure with the same name west from the Marshall Islands.

The Magellan Rise has been called a large igneous province (Note: Other such provinces in the Pacific Ocean are the Hess Rise, Manihiki Plateau, Mid-Pacific Mountains, Ontong Java Plateau and Shatsky Rise.) by Coffin and Endholm 2001 and was emplaced 145 million or 135-128 million years ago, possibly as a consequence of intense volcanism at a former triple junction. Alternatively, the Rise was formed by a mantle plume linked to the deep "JASON superplume", or from the interaction of a spreading ridge with a plume. Candidate mantle plumes are the Easter hotspot and the Foundation hotspot.

The volume of rocks in the Magellan Rise is very uncertain, but may be in the range of 1,800,000 cubic kilometres (430,000 cu mi) to 19,740,000 cubic kilometres (4,740,000 cu mi). It apparently developed first on the Phoenix Plate before being transferred onto the Pacific Plate 125 million years ago. The Magellan Rise has never risen to shallow depths, at least since the Cretaceous, and it is covered by sediments of Tithonian/Berriasian to Quaternary age. The sediments include chalk, chert, limestone (including fossil belemnites, molluscs and polychaetes), phosphorites and volcanic ash from the Ontong Java Plateau, which were emplaced during the Selli Event.
