= Mantle avalanches =

Collapse of deposited sediment at the core-mantle boundary

Mantle avalanches are the collapse of deposited sediment at the core-mantle boundary (CMB). They form from deposits of light elements accumulating on the surface of the core-mantle boundary. The trigger of the collapse can be through several mechanisms, such as the sediment surpassing the angle of repose, an impact from an extraterrestrial body, or iron coupled to the magnetic field being accelerated. The effects that mantle avalanches can have are varied. They can have significant impacts on convection cells, potentially causing magnetic extrusions and reversals. Some of the largest mantle avalanches can possibly cause the formation of mantle plumes.

Schematic section through the Earth. The core-mantle boundary can be seen in (B).

== Formation ==
Material that would make up the sediment for the avalanche consists of light elements. The material rises from the inner core to the surface of the core-mantle boundary. As they rise through the 1000 °C drop in temperature, they freeze out of solution and deposit onto the boundary surface like snow. The estimated rate of sediment deposition is roughly equal to the rate of solidification of the inner core. The inner core solidifies at about 0.1 mm per year, which implies an average of 0.01 mm of sediment deposited a year and 10 meters per million years.

Sediments that accumulate on sloped surfaces might immediately flow into valleys. The surface of the core-mantle boundary does not need to be particularly steep for collapse to occur. Alternatively, it might adhere, similarly to snow, until the surface exceeds the angle of repose and collapses as an avalanche.

=== Trigger ===
The triggers for these sediment deposits to collapse are dependent on both the angle of repose and the shear stress from motion. Several simultaneous mantle avalanches could be triggered by oblique extraterrestrial impacts from asteroids or comets. They do this by imparting sudden high shear changes to the CMB. This is likely the cause of the observed coincidences between craters, tektite fields, and reversals. The magnetic field of the inner core may also play a role. Iron located within the deposits of sediment may be coupled and entrained to this field, causing sudden acceleration of the mantle. This could break off a deep layer of sediment, triggering a slab avalanche.

== Effects ==
Mantle avalanches are believed to have major effects on the environment around them. Their effects include changes in temperature and temperature gradients, disruptions in convection cells, mantle-plume formation, and changes in the geodynamo.

=== Mantle plumes and heat distribution ===
Perhaps one of their most important effect is the redistribution of heat. Cool sediment avalanches up the slopes of the core-mantle boundary, where it mixes with the hot liquid iron of the inner core. The mixed sediment would eventually separate from the iron, leaving behind a layer of cooled iron. The density of this layer will be dependent on temperature, as it will get denser by 2×10^{−5} per centigrade.

Avalanches can expose new areas of the mantle. These mantle regions would have lost their sediment blanket and become exposed to the hot iron and the inner core. The heat from the inner core would repeatedly heat up the area of the mantle. Assuming plausible parameters (viscosity η = 10^{21} kg/m/s, density ρ = 3.5×10^{3} kg/m^{3}, expansion coef. α = 1.5×10^{−5} °C, d = 3×10^{6} m, and thermal diffusivity κ = 10^{−2}) yields a Rayleigh number Ra = 10^{−4}. This number is large enough to suggest that the avalanche and the subsequent heat pulse can trigger the formation of mantle plumes. However, it may be that only the largest of these avalanches with sediment deposits of thickness much greater than 100 meters can trigger mantle-plume formation.

Mantle plumes can fuel flood basalts, which are often responsible for mass extinctions, such as the Siberian traps causing the Great dying or the CAMP eruptions during the End-Triassic extinction. While it typically takes tens of millions of years for a mantle plume to rise up to the surface, there is a possibility of ultra-fast mantle plumes reaching the surface in less than a million years.

=== Geodynamo ===
Mantle avalances may also affect on Earth's geodynamo. Major avalanches that occur at sites where a large convection cell is located could disrupt it. This would disrupt the flow patterns of the cell, leading to it being significantly reduced. After disruption, convection cells will usually re-establish their flow within a few thousand years. However, if the disruption was complete, the "memory" of the previous orientation could be lost. This means that after rebuilding, an extrusion or magnetic reversal can occur.

==== Geodynamo and impactors ====
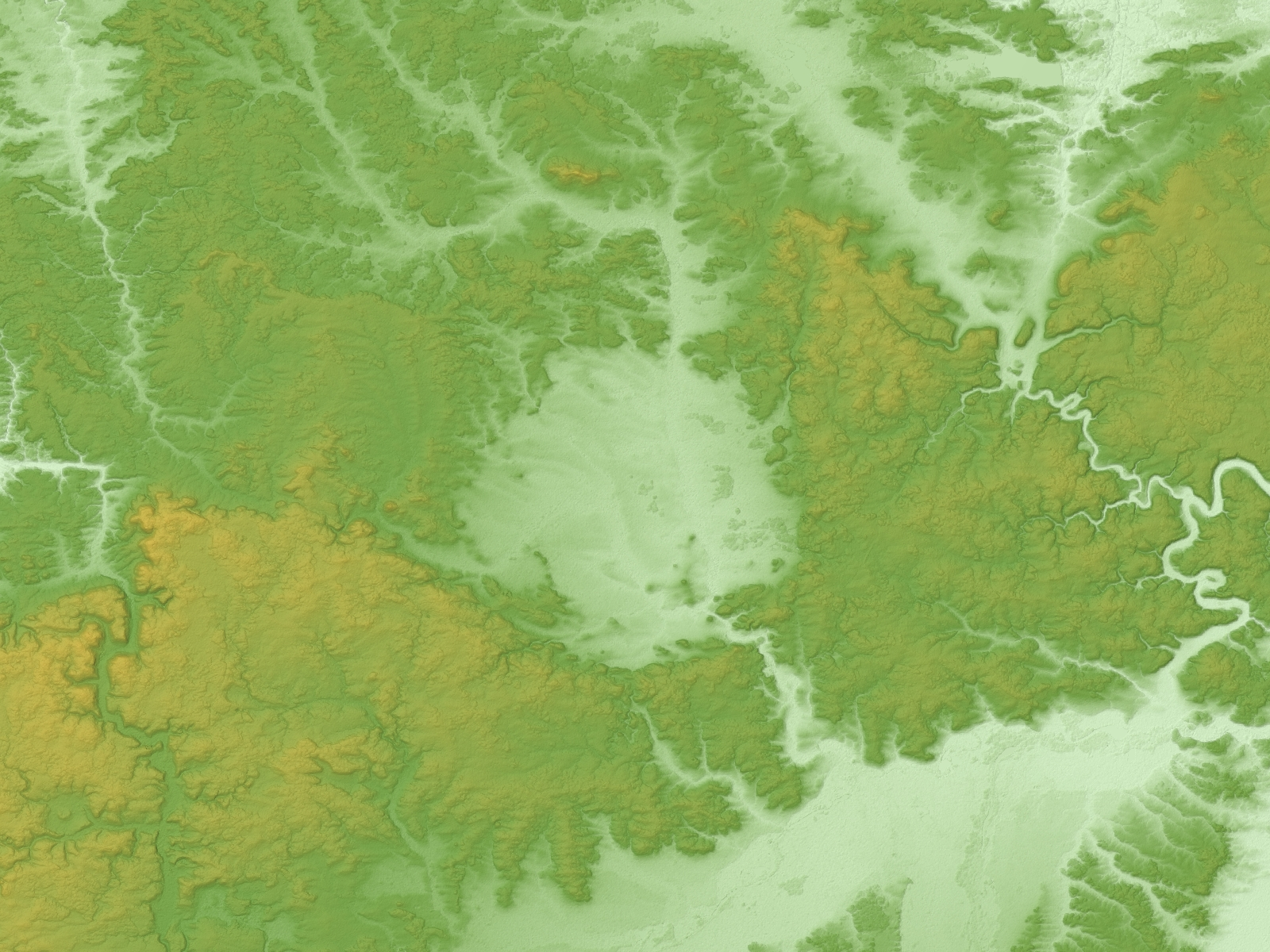
Relief map of Nördlinger Ries in Germany. This crater serves as potential evidence for impacts and reversal events being connected.

There seems to be intriguing evidence that shows a correlation between magnetic reversals and impact events. For example, a reversal event happened immediately after the Ries crater formed, and the Brunhes–Matuyama reversal happened only 6–16.5 thousand years after the formation of the Australasian tektite field. However it seems that only a certain type of impact can be the cause of mantle avalanches that causes reversals. Evidence for only a certain type of impact causing reversals can be seen with large impact events such as one that formed the Chicxulub crater and caused the Cretaceous-Paleogene mass extinction. There is no evidence for a reversal event following the impact. This could mean that only oblique impacts instead of vertical ones trigger reversal events.

=== Landmarks ===
Map showing the oceanic plateaus (green) of the South Pacific, including the Ontong Java plateau (OJP)

It is hypothesized that mantle avalanches have led to the formation of several geologic features on Earth.

It is hypothesized that a mantle avalanche triggered the formation of the Ontong Java Plateau (OJP), one of the largest known volcanic provinces, during the Cretaceous period. One scenario for its formation is that a large impacts caused much of the CMB to experience mantle avalanches simultaneously. One of them would have then triggered the Ontong Java plume, which would go on to form the plateau. If true, such extensive avalanches would have removed much of the sediments that were deposited before. This means that no new avalanches would occur until enough sediments were deposited, which would take 35 million years. This scenario is supported by the gradual rate of increasing reversals, starting from 85 million years ago to the present.
