= Tonga–Kermadec Ridge =

Ridge in the Pacific Ocean

- Stratigraphic range: Mid Miocene to present 16.7–0 Ma
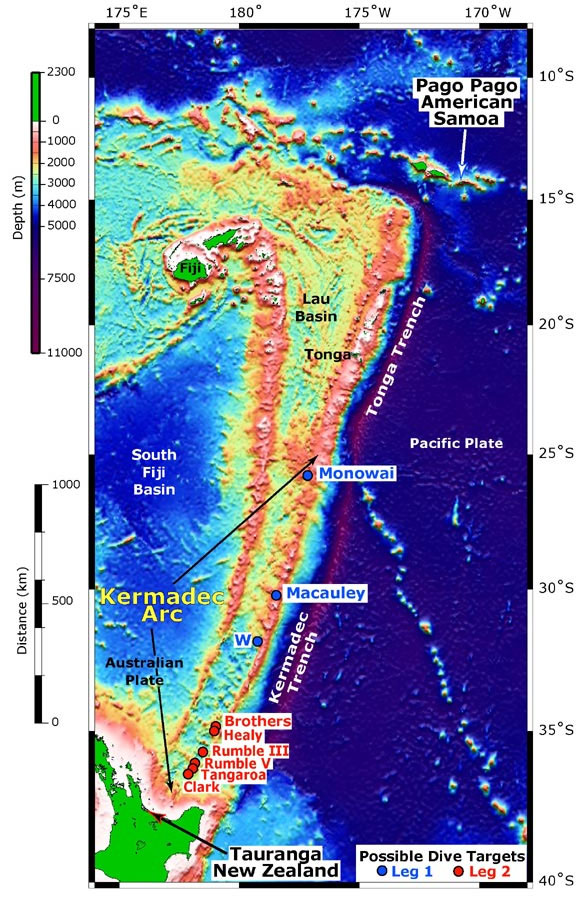
- The Tonga–Kermadec Ridge runs along the Tonga–Kermadec Trench or subduction zone.
- Type: Igneous

Lithology
- Primary: mafic picro-basalts to dacite last 17 Ma
- Other: Underlying diverse subduction and other rocks >100 Ma old

Location
- Coordinates: 25°S 175°W
- Region: South Pacific
- Country: New Zealand

Type section
- Named for: Tonga and Kermadec Islands
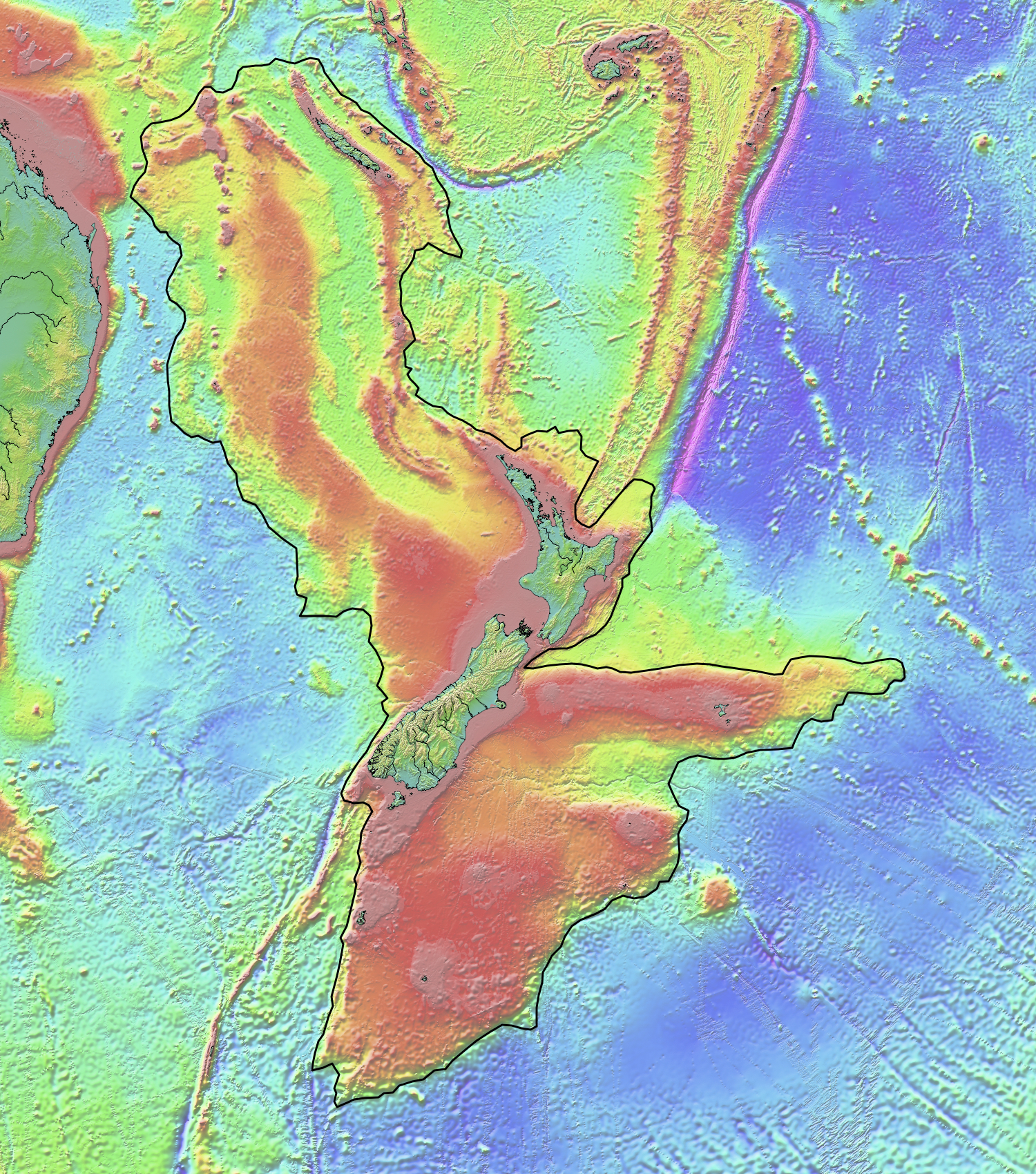
- The Tonga–Kermedec Ridge related to other Pacific Ocean seafloor features

The Tonga–Kermadec Ridge is an oceanic ridge in the south-west Pacific Ocean underlying the Tonga–Kermadec island arc. It is a result of the most linear, fastest converging, and seismically active subduction boundary on Earth, the Kermadec–Tonga subduction zone, and consequently has the highest density of submarine volcanoes.

The Tonga–Kermadec Ridge stretches more than 3,000 km (1,900 mi) north-northeast from New Zealand's North Island. The Pacific Plate subducts westward beneath the Australian Plate along the ridge. It is divided into two segments, the northern Tonga Ridge and southern Kermadec Ridge, by the Louisville Seamount Chain. On its western side, the ridge is flanked by two back-arc basins, the Lau Basin and Havre Trough, that began opening at 6 Ma and 2 Ma respectively. Beyond the basins is the Lau-Colville Ridge. Together with these seafloor structures the ridge forms the eastward-migrating, 100 million year old Lau–Tonga–Havre–Kermadec arc/back-arc system or complex.

The extension in the Lau–Havre basin results in a higher rate of subduction than convergence along the Australian–Pacific plate boundary. The rates of extension, subduction, and convergence all increase northwards in this complex, subduction at a rate of 24–6 cm/year (9.4–2.4 in/year) and extension at a rate of 9.1–15.9 cm/year (3.6–6.3 in/year). As a result, the Tonga–Kermadec Ridge moves independently of both tectonic plates and forms the Tonga–Kermadec plate, in its turn fragmented into the Niuafo'ou, Tonga, and Kermadec microplates.

The Samoa and Louisville mantle plumes both contribute to the lavas of two of the northern Tonga islands, Tafahi and Niuatoputapu; ocean island basalt (OIB) from the Samoa plume were introduced from 3–4 Ma when subduction in the Vitiaz Trench (north-west of Tonga) ceased. The lavas of the Louisville Seamount Chain were generated 80–90 Ma but began to subduct under the Tonga–Kermadec Ridge at c. 8 Ma.

The Hikurangi and Manihiki plateaux, north and south of the Tonga–Kermadec Ridge respectively, form part of the Ontong Java-Hikurangi-Manihiki large igneous province (LIP), the largest volcanic event on Earth during the past 200 million years. The Osbourn Trough, located just north of the Tonga–Kermadec and Louisville intersection, is the palaeo-spreading centre between the Hikurangi and Manihiki plateaux away from which the age of the Pacific Plate increases from c. 85 Ma to 144 Ma. The subduction of the Hikurangi Plateau beneath New Zealand and the southern part of the Kermadec Arc has resulted in large volumes of lava and a high density of volcanoes in the arc. The initial Hikurangi-Kermadec collision, however, occurred 250 km (160 mi) to the north where a missing piece of the Ontong Java-Hikurangi-Manihiki LIP has already been subducted.

== See also ==
- Taupō Volcanic Zone
