= Nikolay Shatsky =

Soviet geologist

Nikolay Sergeyevich Shatsky, also spelt Nicholas Shatski (Russian: Николай Серге́евич Шатский; August 28 [O.S. August 16] 1895 in Moscow – August 1, 1960 in Moscow) was a Soviet geologist, an expert in tectonics of ancient platforms.

Shatsky Rise, an oceanic plateau in North Pacific is named after him.

Since 1982 the USSR Academy of Sciences/Russian Academy of Sciences has awarded the annual Shatsky Prize (ru:Премия имени Н. С. Шатского) for achievements in tectonics.

== Awards ==
- 1946: Stalin Prize
- 1958: Lenin Prize, for the composition of the tectonic map of the Soviet Union
- Order of Lenin (2)
- Order of the Red Banner of Labour
- Medals
