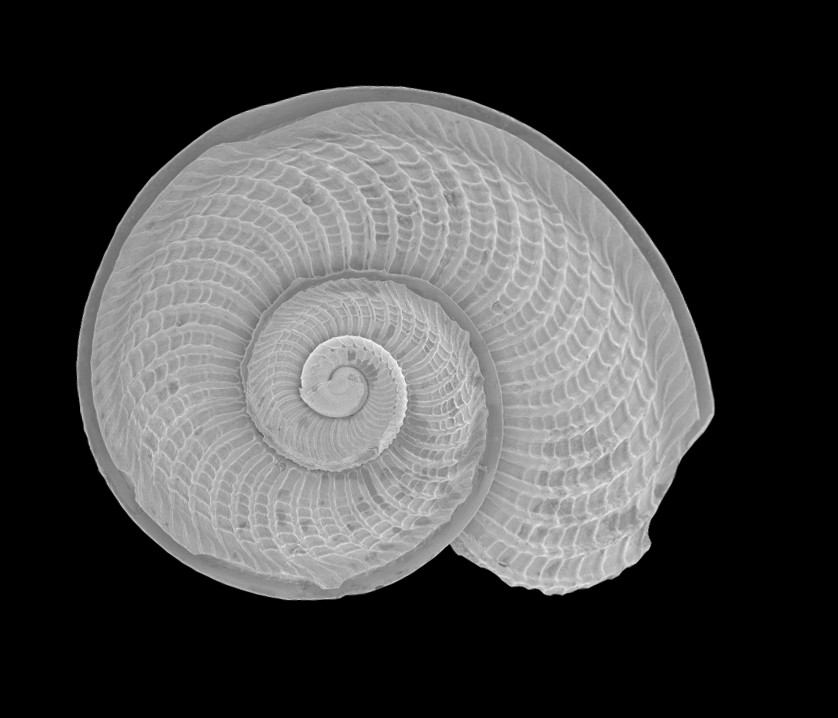
- Type specimen from Te Papa Tongarewa

Scientific classification
- Kingdom: Animalia
- Phylum: Mollusca
- Class: Gastropoda
- Subclass: Vetigastropoda
- Order: Lepetellida
- Superfamily: Scissurelloidea
- Family: Anatomidae
- Genus: Anatoma
- Species: A. flemingi

Binomial name
- Anatoma flemingi (B.A. Marshall, 2002)

Synonyms
- Anatoma mantelli (S. P. Woodward, 1859) sensu A. W. B. Powell, 1979 misapplication; Thieleella flemingi B.A. Marshall, 2002

= Anatoma flemingi =

Species of gastropod

Anatoma flemingi is a species of minute sea snail, a marine gastropod mollusc or micromollusc in the family Anatomidae.

== Description ==
The width of the shell attains 3.5 mm, its length is 2.8 mm.

== Distribution ==
This marine species occurs off New Zealand, also on the Norfolk Ridge, Auckland Island, Antipodes Island, and Chatham Rise.
