= Tongareva triple junction =

Defunct triple junction of the Pacific plate, the Farallon plate, and the Phoenix plate

The Tongareva triple junction, also called the Pacific-Farallon-Phoenix triple junction, was a geologic triple junction in the southwestern Pacific Basin where three tectonic plates met: the Pacific plate, the Farallon plate, and the Phoenix plate. It existed throughout the mid-Cretaceous period and consisted of three mid-ocean ridges. A volcanic episode from 125 to 120 million years ago created an oceanic plateau east of Samoa called the Manihiki Plateau.
