= Splendrillia kapuranga =

Scientific classification
- Kingdom: Animalia
- Phylum: Mollusca
- Class: Gastropoda
- Subclass: Caenogastropoda
- Order: Neogastropoda
- Superfamily: Conoidea
- Family: Drilliidae
- Genus: Splendrillia
- Species: S. kapuranga

Binomial name
- Splendrillia kapuranga Dell, 1953

Species of gastropod

Splendrillia kapuranga is a species of sea snail, a marine gastropod mollusk in the family Drilliidae.

== Description ==
The length of the shell attains 17 mm, its diameter 5.5 mm.

== Distribution ==
This marine species is endemic to New Zealand and occurs off the Chatham Rise, east of South Island at a depth of 550 m.
