= Splendrillia benthicola =

Scientific classification
- Kingdom: Animalia
- Phylum: Mollusca
- Class: Gastropoda
- Subclass: Caenogastropoda
- Order: Neogastropoda
- Superfamily: Conoidea
- Family: Drilliidae
- Genus: Splendrillia
- Species: S. benthicola

Binomial name
- Splendrillia benthicola Dell, 1956

Species of gastropod

Splendrillia benthicola is a species of sea snail, a marine gastropod mollusk in the family Drilliidae.

== Description ==
The length of the shell is 25 mm, its diameter 9.5 mm.

== Distribution ==
This marine species is endemic to New Zealand and occurs off Chatham Rise, East of South Island, New Zealand at depths between 360 m and 530 m.
