= Melanella hadalis =

Scientific classification
- Kingdom: Animalia
- Phylum: Mollusca
- Class: Gastropoda
- Subclass: Caenogastropoda
- Order: Littorinimorpha
- Family: Eulimidae
- Genus: Melanella
- Species: M. hadalis

Binomial name
- Melanella hadalis Knudsen, 1964

Species of gastropod

Melanella hadalis is a species of sea snail, a marine gastropod mollusk in the family Eulimidae. The species is one of many species known to exist within the genus, Melanella.

== Description ==
The length of the shell attains 4.6 mm.

== Distribution ==
This bathyal species occurs in the Kermadec Trench at depths between 6660 m and 6770m.
