= Osbourn Seamount =

Seamount in the southwestern Pacific Ocean

- Location within Pacific Ocean

Location
- Location: South Pacific Ocean
- Coordinates: 26°S 175°W

Geology
- Type: Guyot
- Volcanic arc/chain: Louisville Ridge
- Age of rock: 76.7±0.8 Ma

The Osbourn Seamount is a seamount in the south-west Pacific Ocean. It is the westernmost and oldest unsubducted seamount of the Louisville Ridge, with an estimated age of 78.8 ± 1.3 Ma. Like other seamounts comprising the Louisville Ridge, it was formed by the Louisville hotspot which is currently located 4,300 km (2,700 mi) away near the Pacific-Antarctic Ridge.

Osbourn Seamount will eventually be destroyed by subduction in the Tonga and Kermadec trenches once it is carried into the trenches by the ongoing plate motion. The trench-chain collision zone is moving southward at a rate of 200 km (120 mi)/Ma because of the oblique angle between the trench and the Louisville chain. This further shortens the seamount's lifespan. The flat top of the seamount is currently tilting down toward the trench because the seamount is sitting on the edge of the trench where the Australian Plate is being bent by subduction.

A bathymetric high c. 2 km (1.2 mi) north-west of the Osbourn Seamount has been interpreted as the currently subducting portion of the Louisville chain, but this continuation is not aligned with the existent chain. Whatever the area of subduction of the Louisville chain is associated with a relative seismic gap beneath the Tonga forearc. This implies that the subduction of the volcanoes compared to normal sediment has a significant impact in terms of normal relief of stress but it is unclear if the subducted volcanoes relieve it as suggested by some or increase it. Further the change in trend if the subducted Louisville chain compared to present is backed up by compositional analysis of recent arc volcanism as the volcanics from the Louisville chain are recycled. The Osbourn Seamount is the same age as the Detroit Seamount (75.8±0.6 Ma), one of the oldest of the Hawaii–Emperor seamount chain, and a clockwise bend in the Louisville chain near Osbourn is similar to the Detroit-Meiji bend in the Hawaii–Emperor chain.
