= Exmouth Plateau =

Oceanic plateau in the Indian Ocean

- Oceanic plateaus around Australia and New Zealand
- Type: Extensional Passive Margin

Location
- Coordinates: 20°S 113°E
- Region: Northwestern Australia
- Country: Australia

The Exmouth Plateau is an elongate northeast striking extensional passive margin located in the Indian Ocean roughly 3,000 meters offshore from western and northwestern Western Australia.

The plateau makes up the westernmost structural unit of the Northern Carnarvon Basin, which comprises the Exmouth, Barrow, Dampier, and Beagle Sub-basins, and the Rankin Platform. The Exmouth Plateau was once a part of the northern shore of eastern of Gondwanaland until it broke away during Late Jurassic to Early Cretaceous, leaving behind the oceanic crust of the Argo, Cuvier, and Gascoyne abyssal plains that now surround the distal margins of Exmouth Plateau.

== Tectonic history ==
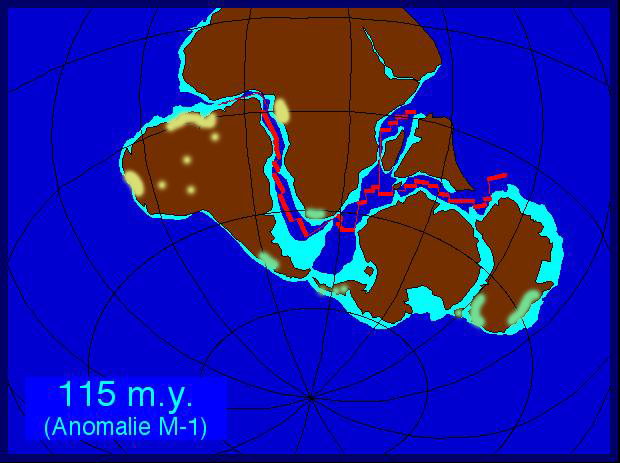
Gondwana during the early Cretaceous

In the Late Jurassic, Gondwanaland begins to break apart creating Western Gondwana, which was composed of the South American and African continental land masses, and Eastern Gondwana. The Eastern Gondwanian continent was composed of Madagascar, Greater India, Antarctica, and Australia. During this period of time Australia shared its southern margin with Antarctica and the western margin (now the Exmouth Plateau) with Greater India. The formation of the Exmouth's northern margin, the Argo Abyssal Plain, was not initiated until 155 million years ago when Australia broke apart from a continental fragment of the Burma Plate that's present location is argued to be subsumed under Asia. It wasn't until 20 million years later that the Greater Indian land mass broke from western Australia, forming the central and southern margins of the Exmouth Plateau now known as the Gascoyne and Cuvier Abyssal Plains. As Australia continued to diverge away from the Antarctic land mass, it migrated in a northeastern direction and rotated counterclockwise to it present location, leaving the Exmouth Plateau along the continent's western margin.

=== Late Triassic ===
In the begin of the late Triassic, high volumes of sediments accumulate off of the shoreline of western Australia to the northern extend of the Exmouth Plateau by the Mungaroo Deltas. The Carnian (237-228 Ma) to Norian (228-209 Ma) aged fluviodeltaic sediments deposited were siliciclastic claystones and sandstones, and detritus which would late make up the coals found in Mungaroo Formation. As extensional rifting between Greater Indian and the Australian continued, magmatic intrusion along the westernmost section of the Exmouth Plateau caused further rifting to the outer margins. By the end of the Late Triassic (209-201 Ma) tectonic activity had relatively slowed down and less deltaic sediments were deposited compared to the Carnian and Norian. More marine sedimentary deposit such as carbonates are found during this time period.

=== Early Jurassic ===
Diagram modeled after Mutter et al. (1989) depiction of the Middle to Late Jurassic extension

During the early Jurassic, extension at the west Australian margin initiated simple shear mechanics creating a system of listric normal faults near the eastern region of the Exmouth Plateau. These listric faults were a product from the development of a major low angle detachment fault between a sedimentary base of Permian-Triassic upper crust and the mid-crustal horizon. As a result, brittle deformation and crustal thinning in the upper crust of the eastern Exmouth Plateau occurred, while in the west, the lower crystalline crust and lithosphere experienced shear stress and thinning. The formation of the fault system closer to the coast caused the initial development of the Exmouth, Barrow, and Dampier sub-basins of the Northern Carnarvon Basin. Carbonate marine sediment, primarily marls, continued to be deposited at this time on the central and western portions of the plateau. Closer to the shoreline siliciclastic mud and silt were deposited from marine and deltaic environments.

=== Middle to late Jurassic ===
Seismic cross section northwest to southeast of the Barrow and Exmouth sub-basins

As extension continued in the mid to late Jurassic, multiple pull-apart basins and oblique right-lateral strike-slip faulting in the eastern margin of the Exmouth Plateau continued to dominate. The simple shear stress of the Exmouth detachment fault between the base of the upper crust, and the lower crust had been reduced in the east plateau. This reduction in simple shear was in part caused by the deformation that developed series negative flower structures and half-graben systems in the west plateau. By this time, the lithospheric thinning that had been initiated during the early Jurassic was now considerably thinner. At this period, a magmatic intrusion between the lower crystalline crest and the lithosphere been introduce, underplating this region.

=== Early Cretaceous ===
In Early Cretaceous, pure shear deformation at the ocean-continental boundary completed the final continental breakup and sea-floor spreading. By this time the overall structural morphology of the Exmouth Plateau had taken shape, aside from the post-breakup subsidence that occurred afterward from the Late Cretaceous to present day. Activity at the eastern Exmouth Plateau's detachment system had likely ceased which is reason for the completion of the plateau's morphology.

== Sequence stratigraphy ==
=== Locker Shale and Mungaroo Formation ===
Period	Epoch	Age	Formation
Triassic	Late	Rhaetian (209-201 Ma)	Brigadier; Formation
Triassic	Late	Norian (228-209 Ma)	Mungaroo; Formation
Triassic	Late	Carnian (237-228 Ma)	Mungaroo; Formation
Triassic	Middle	Ladinian (241-237 Ma)	Mungaroo; Formation
Triassic	Middle	Anisian (247-241 Ma)	Locker; Shale
Triassic	Early	Olenekian (250-247 Ma)	Locker; Shale
Triassic	Early	Induan (252-250 Ma)	Locker; Shale

The Locker Shale and Mungaroo formation are associated with the syn-rift and post-rift sequences of the Permian extension that occurred just prior to the late Triassic extension event across the northwestern margin of Australia. Lying atop unconformable unit of Paleozoic sediments, the Locker Shale is composed of marine sediments deposited in a transgressional environment during the Late Permian extension. These marine sediments were deposited at the base of the Late Triassic and continued up until the end of Anisian age when it transitioned in the Mungaroo Formation. The Mungaroo Formation is an intricate fluvial environment of meandering and braided stream deposits laid down in the Ladinian (~241 Mya) to Norian ages (~209 Mya) during the pre-rift active margin of the Northwestern Australian Shelf. It is one of the thickest formations in the region and becomes progressively thicker (approximately 3,000 m thick) in the distal portions of the Northern Carnarvon Basin furthest offshore. One of the primary gas source for the Exmouth Plateau and Northern Carnarvon Basin, the Mungaroo Formation contains thick successions of siltstone, sandstone, and coal.

=== Brigadier Formation ===
The Mungaroo Formation is capped by thin transgressive sequence of shallow marine claystone and limestone called the Brigadier Formation. This is a much thinner formation than the Mungaroo laid down only for a short period of time between the beginning of the Rhaetian to the Early Hettangian. Due to the thickness of fluvial deltaic deposits from the Mungaroo Formation, the transgressional sequence of the Brigadier Formation is correlated with the subsidence of sub-basins across region during the Middle and Late Triassic.

=== Dingo Claystones ===
Period	Epoch	Age	Lithologies
Jurassic	Late	Tithonian (145-152 Ma)	
Jurassic	Late	Kimmeridgian (157-152 Ma)	Upper Dingo; Claystone
Jurassic	Late	Oxfordian (164-157 Ma)	Upper Dingo; Claystone
Jurassic	Late	Callovian (166-164 Ma)	Upper Dingo; Claystone
Jurassic	Middle	Bathonian (168-166 Ma)	Lower Dingo; Claystone
Jurassic	Middle	Bajocian (170-168 Ma)	Lower Dingo; Claystone
Jurassic	Middle	Aalenian (174-170 Ma)	Lower Dingo; Claystone
Jurassic	Early	Toarcian (183-174 Ma)	Lower Dingo; Claystone
Jurassic	Early	Pliensbachian (191-183 Ma)	Lower Dingo; Claystone
Jurassic	Early	Sinemurian (199-191 Ma)	Lower Dingo; Claystone
Jurassic	Early	Hettangian (201-199 Ma)	Lower Dingo; Claystone

The distribution of sediment packages throughout the Northern Carnarvon Basin and Exmouth Plateau varies with location during the Jurassic. By the Pliensbachian, the general beginning structure of the Northern Carnarvon Basin was formed, creating the Exmouth, Barrow, and Dampier sub-basins along the proximal end of the northwestern Australian margin. Rapid subsidence of the Northern Carnarvon sub-basins ensued the deposition of the Dingo Claystones. These Claystones are thick marine shale deposits separated into two sequence, the Upper and Lower Dingo Claystones. The Lower Dingo sequence cannot be found in the Exmouth Plateau, because deposition During the Early to Middle Jurassic was restricted to sediments filling in the empty troughs of the Northern Carnarvon sub-basins. As deposition continued through the Middle and Late Jurassic, the troughs of sub-basins filled allowing more of the Dingo sediment overflow into the distal margins of the region. This depositional sequence characterizes the Upper Dingo Claystones, which are found as thick proximal sequences in the Northern Carnarvon sub-basins and thinner distal sequences in the Exmouth Plateau.

=== Barrow Group ===
Period	Epoch	Age	Formation
Cretaceous	Late	Maastrichtian (72.1-66.0 Ma)	Miria; Formation
Cretaceous	Late	Campanian (83.6-72.1 Ma)	Toolonga Calcilutite
Cretaceous	Late	Santonian (86.3-83.6 Ma)	Toolonga Calcilutite
Cretaceous	Late	Coniacian (89.8-86.3 Ma)	
Cretaceous	Late	Turonian (93.9-89.8 Ma)	
Cretaceous	Late	Cenomanian (100-93.9 Ma)	Winning; Group
Cretaceous	Early	Albian (100-113 Ma)	Winning; Group
Cretaceous	Early	Aptian (126-113 Ma)	Winning; Group
Cretaceous	Early	Barremian (131-126 Ma)	Winning; Group
Cretaceous	Early	Hauterivian (134-131 Ma)	Winning; Group
Cretaceous	Early	Valanginian (139-134 Ma)	Barrow; Group
Cretaceous	Early	Berriasian (145-139 Ma)	Barrow; Group

During the late Tithonian to early Valanginian there were major changes in depositional patterns, specifically associated with the Barrow Group. At this period of time there was large uplift of the Cape Range Fracture Zone that provided sediments from the Barrow Delta prograde northward past Barrow Island and across the Exmouth Plateau. The sediments of the Barrow Group are composed of interbedded shale and fluvial-deltiac sands that were extensively deposited into Exmouth and Barrow sub-basins.

=== Winning Group ===
Eventually, deposition of the Barrow Delta's sediment ceased during the early or middle Valanginian due to the continental break up at the southern margin of the Exmouth Plateau. This followed seafloor spreading at the Gascoyne and Cuvier Abyssal Plains and erosion at the surface of the Exmouth, Dampier and Barrow sub-basins and an unconformity at the top of the early to middle Valanginian. By the middle to late Valanginian and through the Cretaceous major transgression occurred with deposit of the Winning Group atop the Valanginian unconformity. The Winning Group consists of Muderong Shale, Windalia Radiolarite, and Gearle Siltstone. The Muderong Shale is actually considered a siltstone and was deposited in a low energy, offshore-marine environment. The deposition of these sediments makes a good seal for gas buildups in the Exmouth Plateau and the surrounding sub-basins of the Northern Carnvon Basin. The Windalia Radiolarite are primarily carbonate marine deposits commonly containing poorly preserved radiolarians and foraminifera. The Gearle Siltstone is a low-energy, offshore-marine deposit in a period when input of the terrigenous sediments to the offshore was low minimal.
