= Kermadec Trench =

Linear ocean trench in the South Pacific

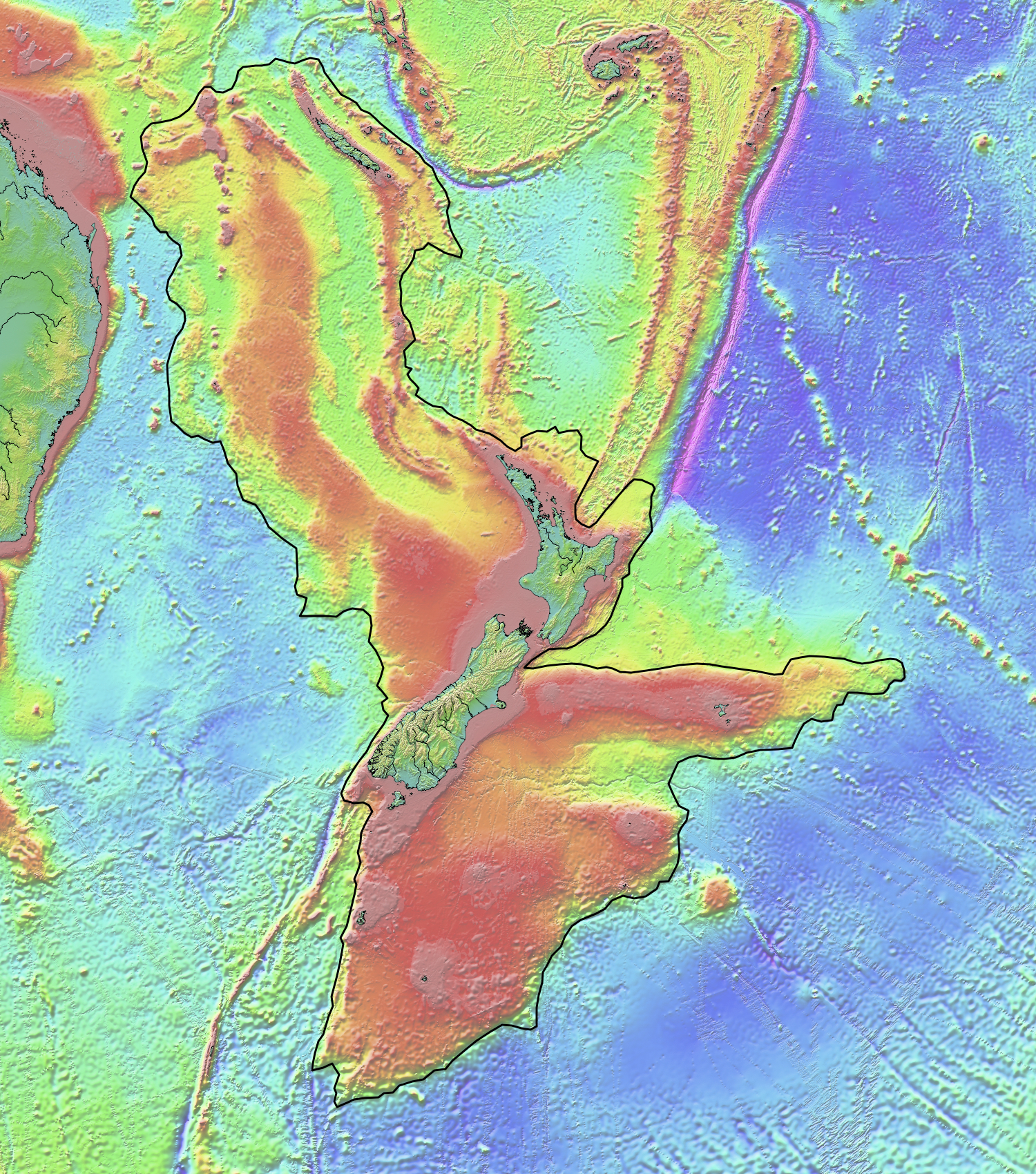
The major geological relationships of the Kermadec Trench (violet) which extends south as a continuation of the Tonga Trench (violet) from the Osbourn Trough to the Hikurangi Trough. Blue represents ocean depths of a kilometer or so and brown shades are shallower. Land is shown in dark green and the black line delineates the continent of Zealandia.

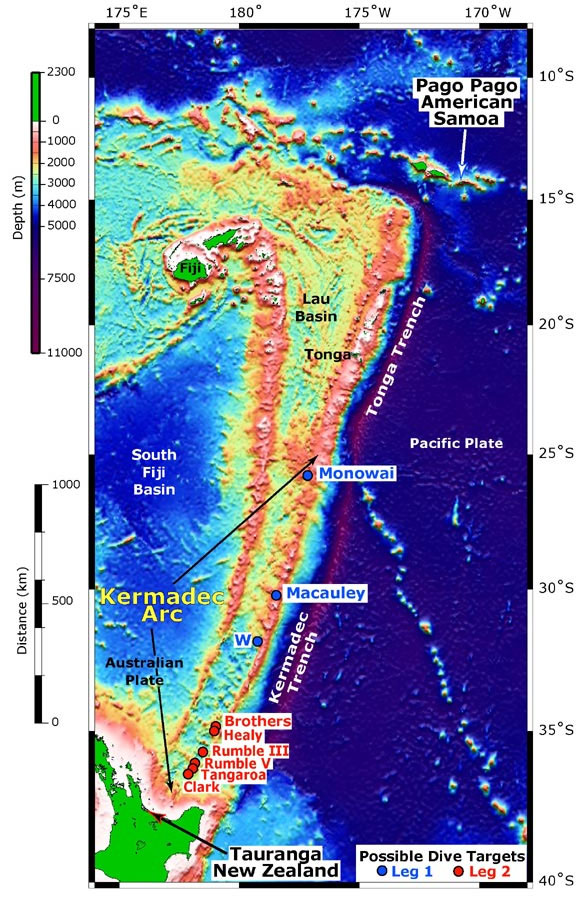
Map of the Kermadec Trench and Tonga Trench, north of New Zealand, near Fiji, Tonga and American Samoa. This map can be enlarged if required.

The Kermadec Trench is a linear ocean trench in the south Pacific Ocean. It stretches about 1,000 km (620 mi) from the Louisville Seamount Chain in the north (26°S) to the Hikurangi Plateau in the south (37°S), north-east of New Zealand's North Island. Together with the Tonga Trench to the north, it forms the 2,000 km (1,200 mi)-long, near-linear Kermadec-Tonga subduction system, which began to evolve in the Eocene when the Pacific plate started to subduct beneath the Australian plate. Convergence rates along this subduction system are among the fastest on Earth, 80 mm (3.1 in)/yr in the north and 45 mm (1.8 in)/yr in the south.

== Geology ==
The Kermadec Trench is one of Earth's deepest oceanic trenches, reaching a depth of 10,047 metres (32,963 ft). Formed by the subduction of the Pacific plate under the Indo-Australian plate, it runs parallel with and to the east of the Kermadec Ridge and island arc. The Tonga Trench marks the continuation of subduction to the north.

The Kermadec Trench has a southern continuation in the turbidite-filled Hikurangi Trough, but a series of seamounts on the Australian plate act as a dam and prevents this turbidity from reaching the sediment-starved Kermadec Trench. Debris from a larger subducted seamount probably dammed the trench from 2 Ma to 0.5 Ma and similar events probably redirected sediments in similar ways before that.

Two oceanic plates meet at the Kermadec Trench which is located far from any larger landmass. Because of this, the Pacific plate as well as the trench itself is only covered by c. 200 m (660 ft) of sediments. The trench is almost perfectly straight and its simple geometry is the result of the uniformity of the subducting sea-floor. This sea-floor formed at the extinct Osbourn Trough, located just north of the Louisville Seamount Chain. Abyssal hills on the subducting sea-floor are oriented perpendicular to the old spreading centre and the sea-floor is 72–80 Ma near the Louisville seamounts at the northern end and more than 100 Ma near Hikurangi Plateau at the southern end. There are no seamounts on the sea-floor near the Kermadec Trench except one sitting on the trench slope at 31.50°S 176.45°W which has been dated to 54.8±1.9 Ma.

The Hikurangi Plateau formed part of the Ontong-Java-Manihiki-Hikurangi large igneous province (LIP) during the Ontong Java Event 120 Ma. The Manihiki Plateau is currently subducting under the southern part of the Kermadec Arc but most of it has already been subducted. The LIP-arc collision occurred 250 km (160 mi) north of its present location, but oblique plate convergence has migrated the subducted plateau southward.

== Fauna ==
In 2012, deep sea researchers discovered individuals of a species of giant amphipod at the trench's lowest depths. Unlike most amphipods, which are approximately 2.5 cm (1 inch) long, this species reaches up to 34 cm (13 inches) in length, and is milky-white.

The second-deepest fish, the hadal snailfish Notoliparis kermadecensis, is endemic to the trench and occupies a very limited depth range, 6,472 to 7,561 m (21,234 to 24,806 ft).

A species of pearlfish, Echiodon neotes, has been caught in the Kermadec Trench at a depth of 8,200–8,300 m (26,900–27,200 ft). All other known pearlfishes live in the range 1,800–2,000 m (5,900–6,600 ft) and the presence of E. neotes at this depth remains unexplained.

== Exploration ==
In May 2014, the Nereus, an unmanned research submarine operated by the Woods Hole Oceanographic Institution (WHOI), imploded due to high pressure at a depth of 9,990 metres while exploring the Kermadec Trench.

In December 2022, a research team from the Chinese Academy of Sciences and National Institute of Water and Atmospheric Research reached the bottom of the Scholl Deep nearly 10 km below the surface.

== See also ==
- Kermadec Islands
- Monowai Seamount
- Tonga-Kermadec Ridge
