= Oceanic plateau =

Relatively flat submarine region that rises well above the level of the ambient seabed

Map showing the location of oceanic plateaus (in green) in the Australia-New Zealand region of the South Pacific

An oceanic or submarine plateau is a large, relatively flat elevation that is higher than the surrounding relief with one or more relatively steep sides.

There are 184 oceanic plateaus in the world, covering an area of 18,486,600 km^{2} (7,137,700 sq mi) or about 5.11% of the oceans. The South Pacific region around Australia and New Zealand contains the greatest number of oceanic plateaus (see map).

Oceanic plateaus produced by large igneous provinces are often associated with hotspots, mantle plumes, and volcanic islands — such as Iceland, Hawaii, Cape Verde, and Kerguelen. The three largest plateaus, the Caribbean, Ontong Java, and Mid-Pacific Mountains, are located on thermal swells. Other oceanic plateaus, however, are made of rifted continental crust, for example the Falkland Plateau, Lord Howe Rise, and parts of Kerguelen, Seychelles, and Arctic ridges. Plateaus formed by large igneous provinces were formed by the equivalent of continental flood basalts such as the Deccan Traps in India and the Snake River Plain in the United States.

In contrast to continental flood basalts, most igneous oceanic plateaus erupt through young and thin (6–7 km (3.7–4.3 mi)) mafic or ultra-mafic crust and are therefore uncontaminated by felsic crust and representative for their mantle sources. These plateaus often rise 2–3 km (1.2–1.9 mi) above the surrounding ocean floor and are more buoyant than oceanic crust. They therefore tend to withstand subduction, more-so when thick and when reaching subduction zones shortly after their formations. As a consequence, they tend to "dock" to continental margins and be preserved as accreted terranes. Such terranes are often better preserved than the exposed parts of continental flood basalts and are therefore a better record of large-scale volcanic eruptions throughout Earth's history. This "docking" also means that oceanic plateaus are important contributors to the growth of continental crust. Their formations often had a dramatic impact on global climate, such as the most recent plateaus formed, the three, large, Cretaceous oceanic plateaus in the Pacific and Indian Ocean: Ontong Java, Kerguelen, and Caribbean.

== Role in crust–mantle recycling ==
Geologists believe that igneous oceanic plateaus may well represent a stage in the development of continental crust as they are generally less dense than oceanic crust while still being denser than normal continental crust.

Density differences in crustal material largely arise from different ratios of various elements, especially silicon. Continental crust has the highest amount of silicon (such rock is called felsic). Oceanic crust has a smaller amount of silicon (mafic rock). Igneous oceanic plateaus have a ratio intermediate between continental and oceanic crust, although they are more mafic than felsic.

However, when a plate carrying oceanic crust subducts under a plate carrying an igneous oceanic plateau, the volcanism which erupts on the plateau as the oceanic crust heats up on its descent into the mantle erupts material which is more felsic than the material which makes up the plateau. This represents a step toward creating crust which is increasingly continental in character, being less dense and more buoyant. If an igneous oceanic plateau is subducted underneath another one, or under existing continental crust, the eruptions produced thereby produce material that is yet more felsic, and so on through geologic time.

== List of oceanic plateaus ==
Global distribution of oceanic plateaus
Ocean	Area (km^{2})	Plateau area (%)	Number of plateaus	Average plateau area (km^{2})
Arctic Ocean	1,193,740	9.19	12	99,480
Indian Ocean	5,036,870	7.06	37	136,130
North Atlantic Ocean	1,628,360	3.64	36	45,230
North Pacific Ocean	1,856,790	2.26	33	56,270
South Atlantic Ocean	1,220,230	3.02	9	135,580
South Pacific Ocean	7,054,800	8.09	50	141,100
Southern Ocean	495,830	2.44	12	41,320
World Ocean	18,486,610	5.11	184	100,470

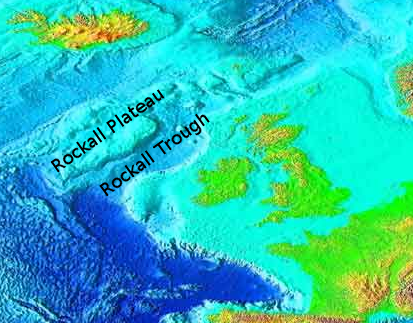
The Rockall Plateau in the North Atlantic is underlain by continental crust. It rifted from Greenland during the opening of the North Atlantic.

=== Continental oceanic plateaus ===
- Campbell Plateau (South Pacific)
- Challenger Plateau (South Pacific)
- Exmouth Plateau (Indian)
- Falkland Plateau (South Atlantic)
- Lord Howe Rise (South Pacific)
- Rockall Plateau (North Atlantic)

=== Igneous oceanic plateaus ===
- Agulhas Plateau (Southwest Indian)
- Azores Plateau (North Atlantic)
- Broken Plateau (Indian)
- Caribbean-Colombian Plateau (Caribbean)
- Exmouth Plateau (Indian)
- Hikurangi Plateau (Southwest Pacific)
- Iceland Plateau (North Atlantic)
- Kerguelen Plateau (Indian)
- Magellan Rise (Pacific)
- Manihiki Plateau (Southwest Pacific)
- Mascarene Plateau (Indian)
- Naturaliste Plateau (Indian)
- Ontong Java Plateau (Southwest Pacific)
- Shatsky Rise (North Pacific)
- Vøring Plateau (North Atlantic)
- Wrangellia Terrane (Northeast Pacific)
- Yermak Plateau (Arctic)

== See also ==
- Abyssal plain
- Bathymetry
- Glossary of landforms
- Ocean bank
