= Louisville Ridge =

Seamount chain in the southwest Pacific Ocean

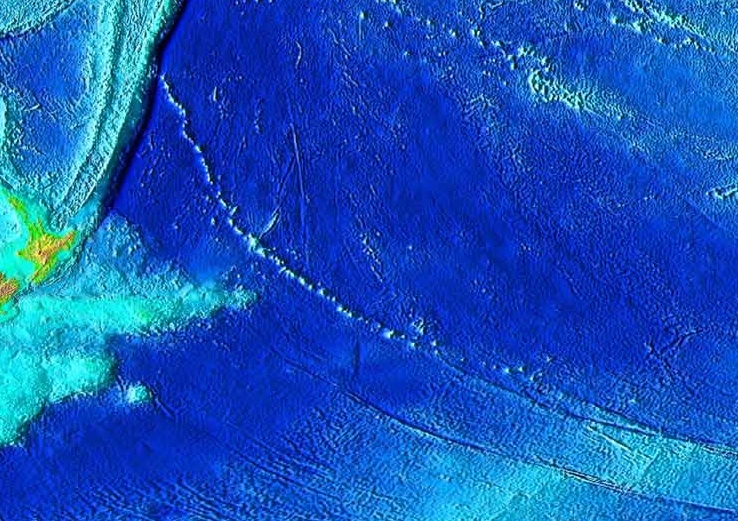
- The Louisville Ridge stretches diagonally across this bathymetric map of the southwest Pacific Ocean.
- The Louisville Ridge stretches diagonally across this bathymetric map of the southwest Pacific Ocean.
- Summit area: length:4,300 km (2,700 mi)

Location
- Location: Southwest Pacific Ocean
- Coordinates: 38.27°S 167.92°W

Geology
- Type: Seamount chain
- Volcanic arc/chain: Louisville hotspot

History
- Discovery date: 1972 (1964)

The Louisville Ridge, often now referred to as the Louisville Seamount Chain, is an underwater chain of over 70 seamounts located in the Southwest portion of the Pacific Ocean. One of the longest seamount chains on Earth, it stretches some 4,300 km (2,700 mi) from the Pacific-Antarctic Ridge northwest to the Tonga-Kermadec Trench, where it subducts under the Indo-Australian Plate as part of the Pacific Plate. The chain's formation is best explained by movement of the Pacific Plate over the Louisville hotspot, although others have suggested that it formed by leakage of magma from the shallow mantle up through the Eltanin fracture zone, which it follows closely for some of its course.

Depth-sounding data first revealed existence consistent with a seamount chain in 1972, although some of the seamounts had been described as a ridge in 1964 linked to the Eltanin fracture zone system, hence the name.

== Geology ==
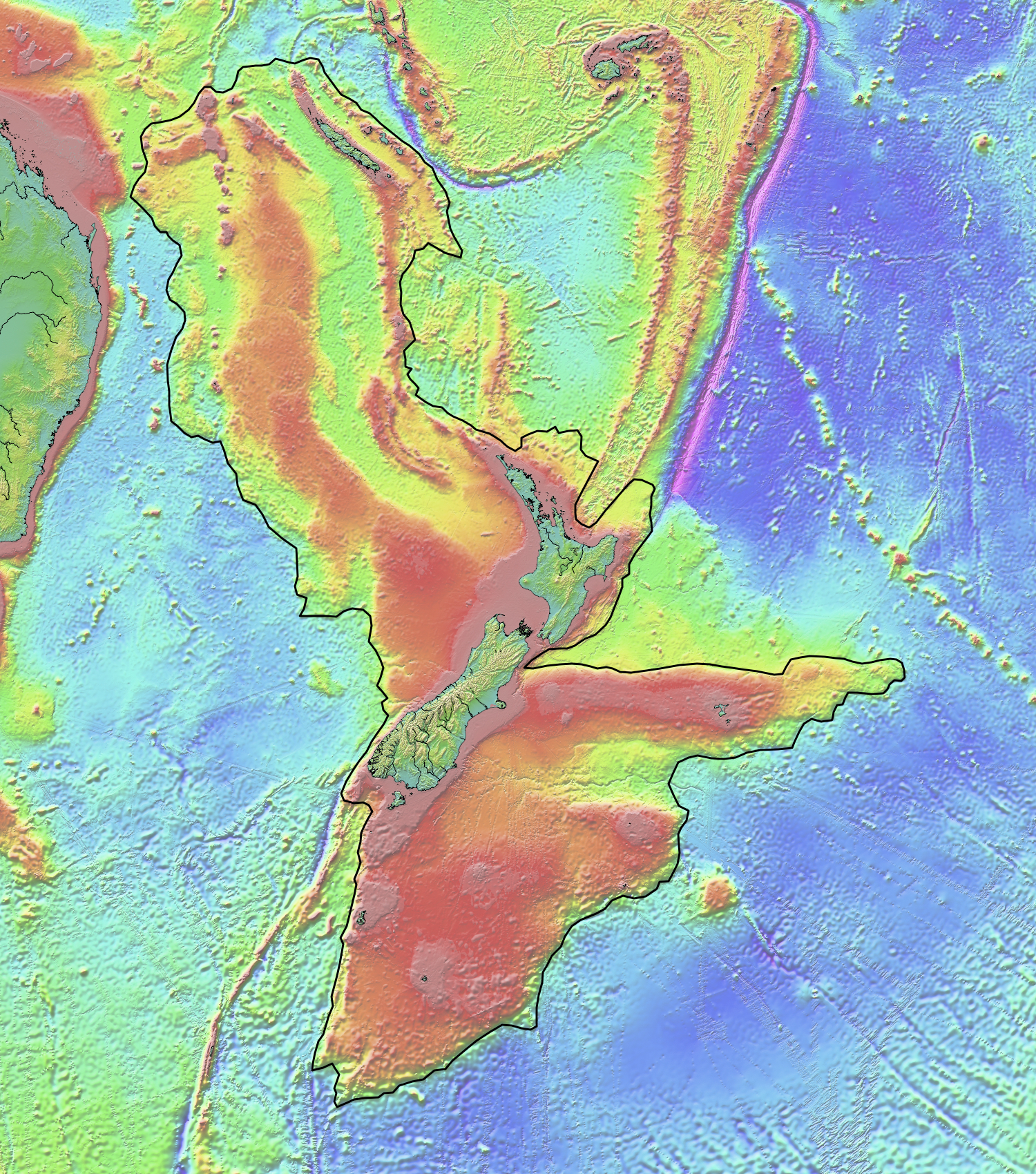
Immediate geological relationships of the chain of the Louisville seamounts. The violet line is the very deep trenches of the Kermadec-Tonga subduction zone with its arc volcanoes to the top left. Blue represents ocean depths of a kilometer or so and brown shades are shallower. The black line delineates the East Chatham Rise part of Zealandia continental crust.

The oldest volcanic rocks of the chain come from Osbourn Seamount at 78.8 ± 1.3 Ma; ages become younger in a nonlinear fashion towards the southeast, with a youngest age of 1.1 Ma.

Composition studies of the erupted dominantly alkali basalt are consistent with a single Louisville mantle source distinct from other hotspots, and the composition has remained homogeneous over at least the last 70 million years. In the past 25 million years, magma upwelling rates may have decreased. There is almost certainly a deep plume origin to the hotspot.

The Louisville hotspot chain passes through the western and eastern branches of the Wishbone scarp, and while the seamounts show no compositional change as they cross the scarps, the East Wishbone scarp crossing point is associated with a distinct decrease in the volume of the younger seamount eruptives from that point east into the Pacific Plate.

== Tectonics ==
Volcanic hotspot chains are used to suggest the net movements of tectonic plates, and so in the case of the large Pacific Plate, validation of models of its movement and indeed the hotspot hypothesis itself relies on data from several hot spot chains. As well as the Louisville hotspot, there is data over tens of millions of years available from the movements of the Hawaii hotspot and the Arago hotspot. While the model of Pacific Plate movement, including bends in the hotspot track, can be made to fit very well, there has been long debate on the timings of such bends as mismatches of a few million years appeared to exist.

=== Subduction ===
The area of subduction of the Louisville chain into the Tonga Trench is associated with a relative seismic gap beneath the Tonga forearc. This implies that the subduction of the volcanoes compared to normal sediment has a significant impact in terms of normal relief of stress, but it is unclear if the subducted volcanoes relieve it as suggested by some or increase the potential for sudden release. Further, a postulated historic change in the trend of the subducted Louisville chain compared to present is backed up by compositional analysis of more recent arc volcanism as the volcanics from the Louisville chain are recycled. A bathymetric high c. 2 km (1.2 mi) northwest of the Osbourn Seamount has been interpreted as the currently subducting portion of the Louisville chain, but this continuation is not aligned with the extant chain.

== Ecology ==
Some of the seamounts are known coral reef stoney habitats, with typical species including the coral Solenosmilia variabilis, brisingid starfishes (Order Brisingida), and sea-lilies and feather stars (Class Crinoidea). They can be a fishery resource for species such as the orange roughy (Hoplostethus atlanticus) that can be fished by bottom trawling.

== Seamounts ==
The Louisville Ridge includes the following:

Louisville Seamounts or Guyots
Name/ID	Position	Age	Minimum Depth	Notes/Source
39 South Seamount	39.1°S 167.4°W		878 m (2,881 ft)	
AMAT 1D-1	27°30.9′S 174°20.6′W	68.9 to 70.8 Ma		
AMAT 7D	38°2.3′S 168°15.9′W	50.9 to 47.4 Ma		
AMAT 14D	39°13.1′S 167°37.1′W	44.7 to 43.9 Ma		
AMAT 15D-1	39°31.2′S 167°15.3′W	45.1±0.3 Ma		
AMAT 16D-1	39°40.6′S 166°38.6′W	43.3±0.4 Ma		
AMAT 17D-1	39°51.9′S 166°2.7′W	41.3±0.3 Ma		
AMAT 20D	40°26.7′S 165°44.4′W	40.4 to 39.8 Ma		
AMAT 22D	40°44.5′S 165°27.6′W	39.6 to 38.9 Ma		
AMAT 24D	41°52.7′S 163°41.9′W	34.7 to 33.7 Ma		
AMAT 26D	43°34.5′S 161°29.3′W	32.2 to 29.5 Ma		
AMAT 27D	43°59.7′S 160°37.1′W	29.3 to 26.3 Ma		
AMAT 28D	44°16.5′S 159°48.9′W	25.6 ± 0.2 Ma		
AMAT 30D	44°50.6′S 158°28.4′W	26.3 to 26.0 Ma		
AMAT 31D	45°22.9′S 157°44′W	24.6 to 23.9 Ma		
AMAT 33D	46°13.2′S 155°52.7′W	21.5 to 21.7 Ma		
Anvil Seamount	37.56°S 169.15°W		1,036 m (3,399 ft)	
Archerbar Seamount, U1375	33.73°S 171.44°W	62.8 to 60.8 Ma		Not gazetted name, and note that poor sample specimen, Latest ages
Burton Seamount (s)	32.416667°S 171.75°W	64.2 to 62.8 Ma		Location and Gazetted names, Latest ages and also known as Burton Guyot
Canopus Seamount, U1372	26°29′6″S 174°43′8″W	73.8 to 72.1 Ma		Not gazetted name, Location, Latest ages
Censeam Seamount	36.92°S 169.73°W		955 m (3,133 ft)	
Currituck Seamount	30.2°S 173.233333°W	61.4 ± 0.5 Ma	1,750 m (5,740 ft)	Also named Carrituck Seamount, Currituok Seamount, Gora Karrituok, Гора Карритуок
Danseur Seamount	36°S 169.5°W			
Darvin Guyot	43.4°S 161.41667°W		393 m (1,289 ft)	Named from the Russian research vessel "Darvin" of the Russian Fisheries Ministry that discovered it in 1985
Forde Seamount	35.4°S 170.4°W		980 m (3,220 ft)	
Ghost Seamount	40.7°S 165.35°W		620 m (2,030 ft)	
Hadar Seamount, U1377B, AMAT 10D	38°11.25′S 168°38.26′W	51.2 to 45.1 Ma		Not gazetted name, Location, Latest ages
JCM Seamount	38.41°S 167.99°W		265 m (869 ft)	
Osbourn Seamount	26°S 175°W	78.8 to 76.7 Ma		Other names Gora Osborn, Ozbourn Seamount, Ozbourne Seamoun, Гора Осборн
Pierson Seamount	34.966667°S 170.75°W			
Rigil Guyot, U1374	29°35′7″S 173°22′8″W	70.1 to 67.4 Ma		Not gazetted name, Location, Latest ages
Rumyantsev Seamount	46.18359°S 155.8942°W			Named after the Russian ichthyologist A. I. Rumyantsev
Seafox Seamount	30.616667°S 172.833333°W			
Trobriant Seamount	33.666667°S 171.416667°W			
Valerie Guyot	41.45°S 164.25°W		750 m (2,460 ft)	
Vostok Seamount	39.16667°S 167.36667°W		823 m (2,700 ft)	Dimensions 43 km (27 mi) x 31 km (19 mi), named after the Russian ship "Vostok"

== See also ==
- Louisville hotspot
- Hollister Ridge
- Hotspot (geology)
- Zealandia
