= Chatham Rise =

Area of ocean floor to the east of New Zealand

Coordinates: 43.7°S 179.7°E

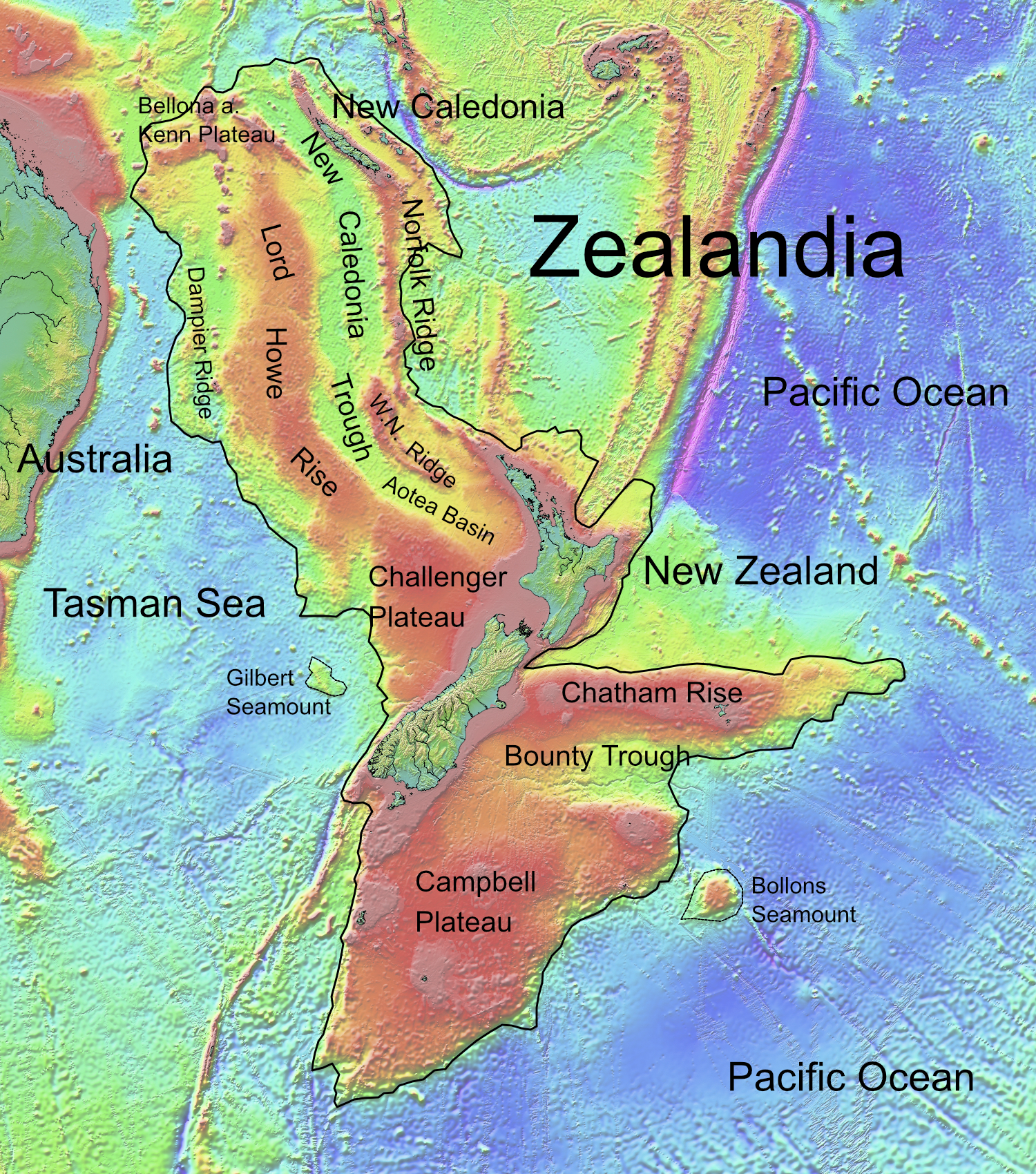
Topographic map of Zealandia showing the Chatham Rise

The Chatham Rise is an area of ocean floor to the east of New Zealand, forming part of the Zealandia continent. It stretches for some 1,000 kilometres (620 mi) from near the South Island in the west, to the Chatham Islands in the east. It is New Zealand's most productive and important fishing ground, as well as an important habitat for whales.

Relative to the rest of the Pacific Ocean waters around New Zealand, the Chatham Rise is relatively shallow, no more than 1,000 metres (3,300 ft) deep at any point. This shallowness is made more remarkable by the depth of the ocean immediately to the north and south. To the northeast, the Hikurangi Trough, an extension of the much deeper Kermadec Trench, drops to below 3,000 m (9,800 ft) close to the New Zealand coast, and further from the coast the Rise borders on the Hikurangi Plateau. To the south, similar depths are achieved in the Bounty Trough. Past the eastern end of the rise, the sea floor drops away to the abyssal plain.

== Geology ==
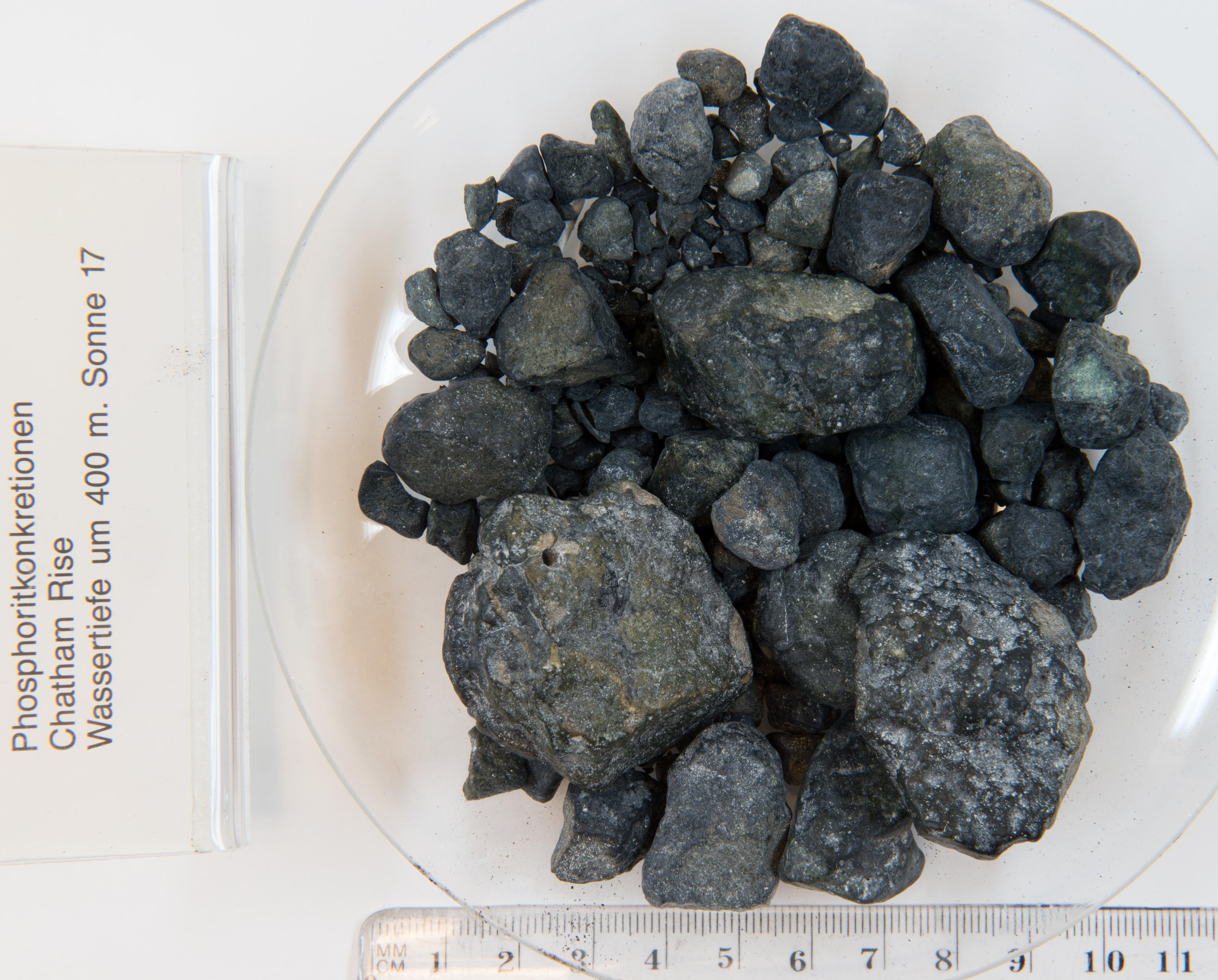
Phosphorite from the Chatham Rise

Geologically and tectonically, the Chatham Rise can be thought of as an extension of the eastern South Island. It was largely dry land at the end of the Cretaceous (66 million years ago) and formed a large peninsula extending from New Zealand to the Chatham Islands at that time.

The Cretaceous landscape of the Chatham Rise was characterized by a volcanic landscape. Fossils found on the Chatham Islands characterize the flora and fauna of the Chatham Rise in the late Mesozoic. The region had forests dominated by gymnosperms (such as Araucaria, Mataia and Podocarpus) and Lycopodiopsida (clubmosses). Some angiosperms were also present. Dinosaurs such as theropods dwelt on the peninsula and probably evolved into numerous endemic forms (Stilwell et al. 2006).

== Commercial fishing ==
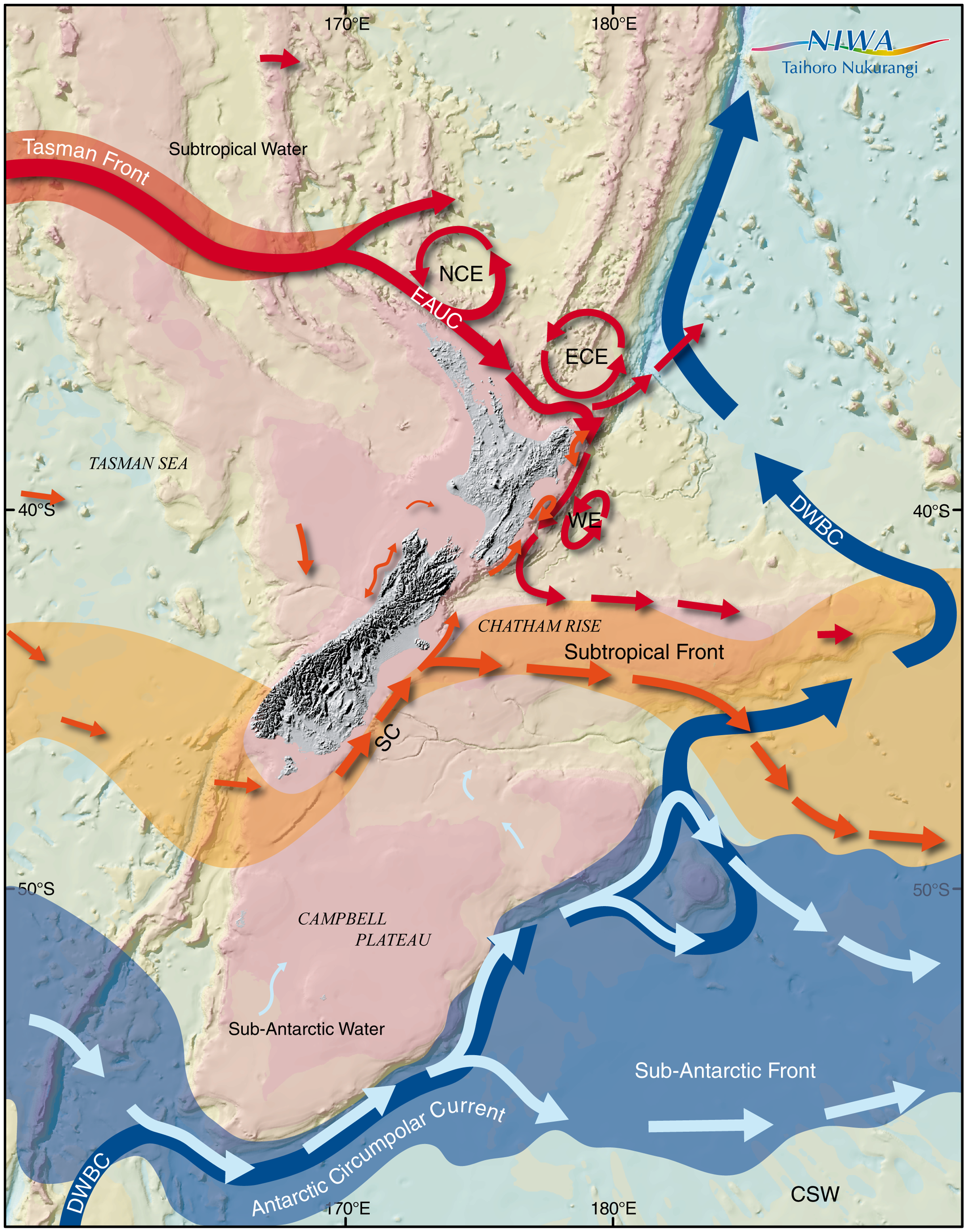
Subtropical and subantarctic waters meet to form the subtropical front over the Chatham Rise (orange)

The Chatham Rise is New Zealand's most productive and important commercial fishing ground. The region is analogous to the North Sea's Broad Fourteens, but is significantly deeper.

Warm subtropical surface waters from the north and cold subantarctic surface waters from the south meet in the vicinity of the Chatham Rise to create a subtropical front. Nutrient rich waters from the south mix with warm northern waters and create ideal conditions for plankton and the animals that feed on them.

The fishing grounds near the subtropical front and particularly the Chatham Rise provide 60% of New Zealand's fish catch. Because the Chatham Rise is relatively shallow, it is accessible to both midwater trawling and bottom trawling. Species include the main hoki, hake, ling, silver warehou, squid, orange roughy and deep sea (oreo) dory fisheries.

The traditional approach to fisheries management has been to focus on a single species – determining how many can be caught before the breeding population is affected to the point of harming the species fishery. There is a current trend towards ecosystem based fisheries. Removing any fish affects other marine life up and down the food chain, such as marine life that eat the fish, and the marine life eating the marine life that eat the fish. Scientists from NIWA are examining over 40,000 fish stomachs to see what different species are eating across the Chatham Rise. These studies, combined with other studies on marine mammals and sea birds and with relevant ocean and climate studies, will show how the different parts fit together in the Chatham Rise ecosystem.
