= List of volcanoes in New Zealand =

This is a partial list of active, dormant, and extinct volcanoes in New Zealand.

== Kermadec Arc and Havre Trough ==
Name	Elevation		Location	Last eruption
Name	metres	feet	Coordinates	Last eruption
Brothers Seamount	-1350	-4400	34.875°S 179.075°E	-
Clark Seamount	-860	-2800	36.446°S 177.839°E	-
Cole Seamount	-1100	-3600	33.410°S 179.871°E	-
Cotton Seamount	-950	-3100	35.05°S 178.99°E	-
Curtis Island	137	449	30°32′26.97″S 178°33′25.69″W	-
Gamble Seamount	-226	-741	27.207°S 177.432°W	-
Giggenbach Seamount	-65	-210	30.036°S 178.712°E	-
Havre Seamount	-730	-2360	31°07′13″S 179°58′07″W	2012
Hinepuia Seamounts	-	-	26.343°S 177.317°W	-
Hinetāpeka Seamount	-96	-315	28.691°S 177.776°W	-
James Healy Seamount	-1150	-3800	34.98°S 179.00°E	1360
Macauley Island	238	781	30.14°S 178.26°W	Holocene
Monowai Seamount	-100	-330	25.887°S 177.188°W	2008
Pūtoto Seamount	-225	-738	27.930°S 177.611°W	-
Rakahore Seamount	-560	-1837	26.780°S 177.400°W	-
Raoul Island	516	1693	29.16°S 177.55°W	2006
Rumble I Seamount	-1100	-3610	35.5°S 178.9°E	-
Rumble II Seamount	-880	-2890	35.4°S 178.6°E	-
Rumble III Seamount	-140	-459	35.745°S 178.478°E	1986
Rumble IV Seamount	-450	-1476	36.13°S 178.05°E	-
Rumble V Seamount	-1100	-3610	36.139°S 178.197°E	-
Silent I Seamount	-	-	34.975°S 179.283°E	-
Silent II Seamount	-780	-2559	35.167°S 178.878°E	-
Tangaroa Seamount	-600	-2000	36.321°S 178.028°E	-
Wright Seamounts	-750	-2500	31.5°S 179.2°E	-

== North Island ==
=== Taupō Volcanic Zone ===
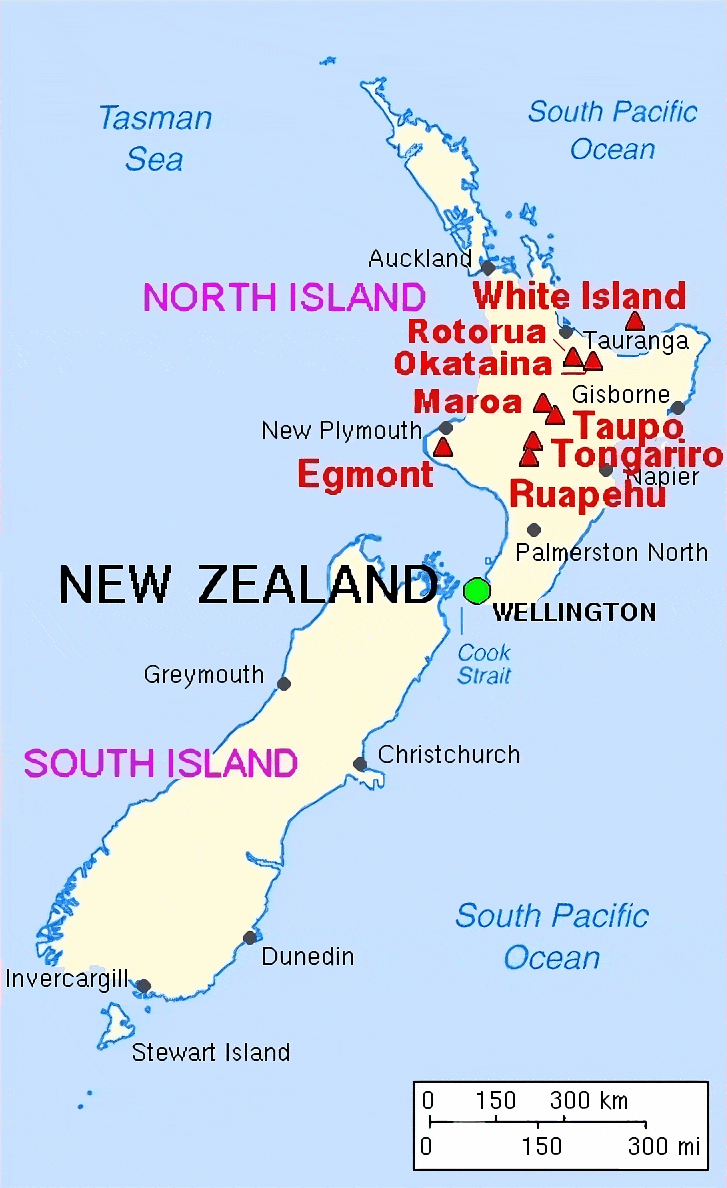
Major volcanoes of New Zealand

Name	Elevation		Location	Last eruption
Name	metres	feet	Coordinates	Last eruption
Hauhungatahi	1521	4990	39.23°S 175.44°E	-
Kakaramea-Tihia Massif	1300	4300	38°59′20″S 175°42′30″E	20,000 years ago
Kawerau	-	-	-	-
Manawahe			37.9639°S 176.6713°E	~ 400,000 years ago
Mangakino Caldera	-	-	-	-
Maroa Caldera	1156	3793	38.42°S 176.08°E	180
Maunga Kākaramea / Rainbow Mountain	743	2438	38.319°S 176.388°E	-
Mount Maunganui	232	-	37.630°S 176.171°E	-
Maungaongaonga	825	2707	38.326°S 176.345°E	
Mayor Island / Tūhua	338	1165	37°17′S 176°15′E	4390 BC ± 200 years
Mokoia Island	-	-	38°4′52.52″S 176°17′3.89″E	-
Moutohora Island	354	1161	37.858°S 176.98°E	Pleistocene
Mount Ngauruhoe	2291	7516	39°09′24.6″S 175°37′55.8″E	1977
Mount Ngongotahā	487	-	39°7′5.59″S 176°11′51.20″E	-
Ōkataina Caldera	1111	3645	38.12°S 176.50°E	1973
Pihanga	1325	4347	39°02′28.75″S 175°46′7″E	-
Putauaki (Mt Edgecumbe)	867	-	38.1°S 176.8°E	~ 300 BC
Reporoa Caldera	592	1942	38.42°S 176.33°E	1180 (hydrothermal)
Lake Rotorua	757	2484	38.08°S 176.27°E	Pleistocene
Mount Ruapehu	2797	9177	39°16′54.19″S 175°34′6.64″E	2007
Rungapapa Knoll	-	-	37.547°S 176.98°E	Pleistocene
Tama Lakes	-	-	-	-
Mount Tarawera (part of the Okataina caldera)	1111	3644	38.22°S 176.5°E	1886
Mount Tauhara	1087	3569	38°41′40″S 176°9′46″E	Pleistocene
Taupō Volcano	760	2493	38.82°S 176.00°E	181
Mount Tongariro	1968	6456	39°8′S 175°39′E	2012
Waiotapu	592	1942	38.42°S 176.33°E	1180
Whakaari / White Island	321	1053	37.52°S 177.18°E	2024
Whakatāne Seamount	-980	-3200	36.8°S 177.5°E	-

=== Elsewhere ===
Name	Elevation		Location	Last eruption
Name	metres	feet	Coordinates	Last eruption
Auckland volcanic field	260	853	36.90°S 174.87°E	1421
Bombay Hills (part of the South Auckland volcanic field)	379	-	-	550,000 years ago
Kārewa / Gannet Island	-	-	-	500,000 years ago
Kaikohe-Bay of Islands volcanic field	388	1273	35.30°S 173.90°E	1550 ± 250 years ago
Kaitake	-	-	-	500,000 years ago
Kakepuku	449	1473	38°04′06″S 175°15′07″E	1.6 million years ago
Karioi	756	2480	37.50°S 174.49°E	2.4 million years ago
Little Barrier Island	722	2360	-	1.5 million years ago
Manukau volcano	474	1555	36°54′S 174°18′E	16 million years ago
Maungatautari	797	2615	38°01′08″S 175°34′33″E	1.8 million years ago
Paritutu and the Sugar Loaf Islands	153	-	-	1.7 million years ago
Mount Pirongia	962	3156	37°59′28″S 175°05′53″E	1.6 million years ago
Pureora	1165	3822	38°33′07″S 175°37′40″E	1.6 million years ago
Ngatutura volcanic field	140	-	37.54°S 174.80°E	1.6 million years ago
Poor Knights Islands	-	-	-	4 million years ago
Pouakai	-	-	-	240,000 years ago
Rangitoto Island (part of the Auckland volcanic field)	260	853	36°47′13″S 174°51′29″E	1350
South Auckland volcanic field	379	-	37.1955°S 175.0181°E	550,000 years ago
Mount Taranaki or Mount Egmont	2518	8261	39.3°S 174.1°E	1755
Titiraupenga	1042	3419	38°30′36″S 175°41′31″E	1.89 million years ago
Whangarei volcanic field	397	1302	35.75°S 174.27°E	-

== South Island ==
Name	Elevation		Location	Last eruption
Name	meters	feet	Coordinates	Last eruption
Mount Somers	1,688	5,538	43.70°S 171.40°E	89 million years ago
Akaroa Volcano	-	-	43°48′S 172°57′E	Miocene
Dunedin Volcano	680	2218	45°49′S 170°39′E	c. 10 million years ago
Mount Horrible (near Timaru)	-	-	44°23′S 171°3′E	2 million years ago
Lyttelton Volcano	919	3010	43°36′S 172°43′E	Miocene

== Other ==
Name	Elevation		Location	Last eruption
Name	meters	feet	Coordinates	Last eruption
Antipodes Islands	402	1319	49.68°S 178.77°E	Holocene
Auckland Island	650	1981	50.69°S 166.08°E	Miocene
Mount Dick (Adams Island)	705	2313	50°52′28″S 166°4′55″E	-
Pitt Island	241	791	44.18°S 176.13°W	Ancient
Solander Islands	330	1080	46°34′S 166°53′E	Pleistocene

=== Ross Dependency ===
New Zealand also has de facto administration over Ross Dependency in Antarctica, which contains the following volcanoes:

Name	Elevation		Location	Last eruption
Name	meters	feet	Coordinates	Last eruption
Mount Bird (Ross Island)	1765	5791	77°16′S 166°45′E	3.8 million years ago
Brown Peak (Sturge Island, Balleny Islands)	1500	5000	67°24′S 164°50′E	2001
Buckle Island (Balleny Islands)	1239	4065	66°48′S 163°15′E	1899
Mount Discovery (Scott Coast)	2681	8796	78°22′S 166°01′E	1.8 million years ago
Mount Erebus (Ross Island)	3794	12448	77°32′S 167°17′E	2008 (continuing)
Mount Terror (Ross Island)	3230	10597	77°31′S 168°32′E	~ 800,000 years ago
Young Island (Balleny Islands)	1340	4396	66°25′S 162°27′E	-
