= 2012 Kermadec Islands eruption =

Major undersea volcanic eruption in the Kermadec Islands of New Zealand

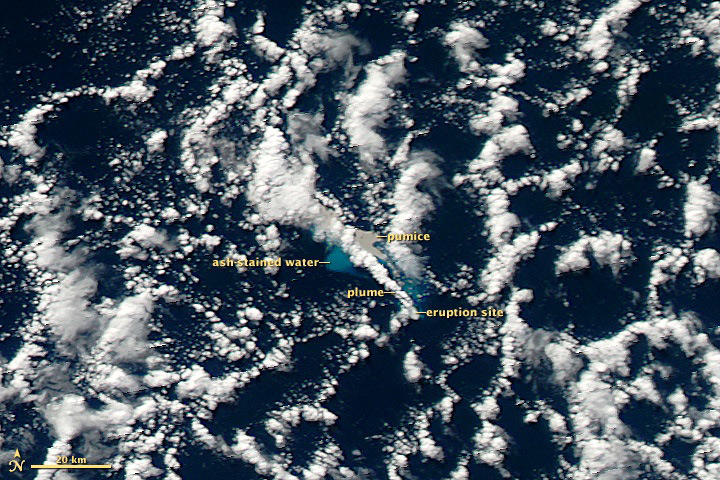
- NASA image of Havre Seamount eruption and initial formation of pumice raft
- Volcano: Havre Seamount
- Start date: 18 July 2012
- Start time: Morning
- End date: 19 July 2012
- Type: Submarine
- Location: Kermadec Islands; 31°07′13″S 179°58′07″W
- VEI: 1

The 2012 Kermadec Islands eruption was a major undersea volcanic eruption that was produced by the previously little-known Havre Seamount near the L'Esperance and L'Havre Rocks in the Kermadec Islands of New Zealand. The large volume of low density pumice produced by the eruption accumulated as a large area of floating pumice, a pumice raft, that was originally covering a surface of 400 square kilometres (150 square miles), spread to a continuous float of between 19,000 and 26,000 km^{2} (7,500 and 10,000 sq mi) and within three months dispersed to an area of more than twice the size of New Zealand.

The thickness of the raft may initially have been as high as 3.5 metres (11 feet) and was reduced to around 50 cm (20 in) within a month.

Three months after the eruption, the mass had dispersed into very dilute rafts and ribbons of floating pumice clasts. Most pumice clasts became waterlogged and sank to the sea floor, while some flocks have stranded in the Tonga islands, on the northern shores of New Zealand, and eventually on the eastern coast of Australia one year after the eruption.

While the eruption is officially rated as a VEI-1 by the Smithsonian Institution, studies have found that approximately 1.5 cubic kilometres of material erupted, which correlates to a VEI-5 eruption.

== Eruption ==
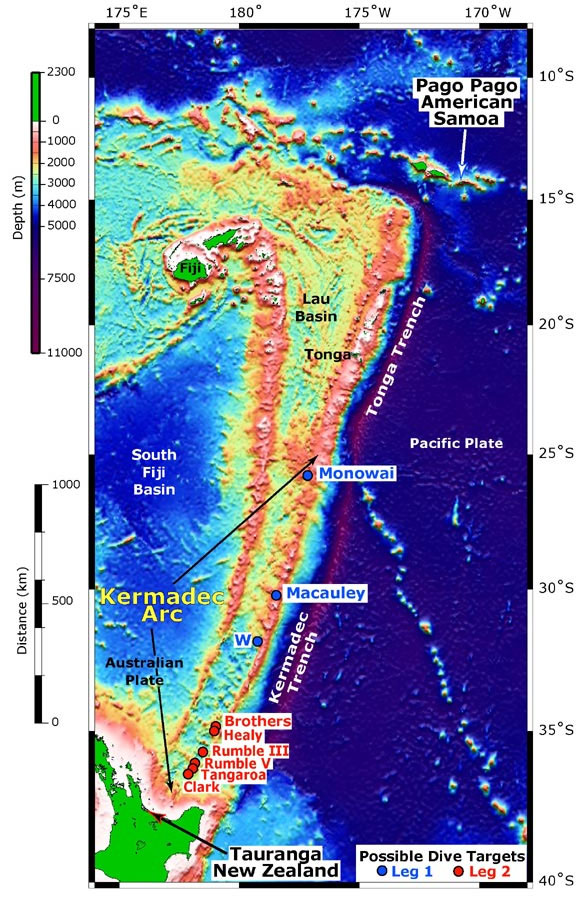
Bathymetric map of Kermadec islands and seamounts

The eruption of the Havre Seamount was not initially noticed by scientists, and volcanologists were not even aware that the Havre Seamount was an active submarine volcano. After the pumice raft was detected, researchers retrospectively examined satellite imagery and past seismic activity in an attempt to pinpoint the time and location of the eruption that produced the pumice raft. Seismologists discovered a cluster of earthquakes (ranging in magnitude between 3.0 and 4.8) that occurred 18–19 July 2012. These earthquakes were consistent with magma rising into a magma chamber prior to eruption. Analysis of satellite imagery showed an ash plume appear on 18 July 2012 and conclude several days later. Although some volcanologists initially believed that the eruption might have occurred at the Monowai Seamount, this possibility was later ruled out. It is also believed that the eruption was unrelated to the 2012 Te Māri eruption at New Zealand's Mount Tongariro.

In 2015, a scientific expedition set out to study changes of seafloor topography in the area surrounding Havre Seamount. The same group of researchers mapped the distribution of the floating pumice blocks driven by wind, ocean currents and eddies.

== Pumice raft ==
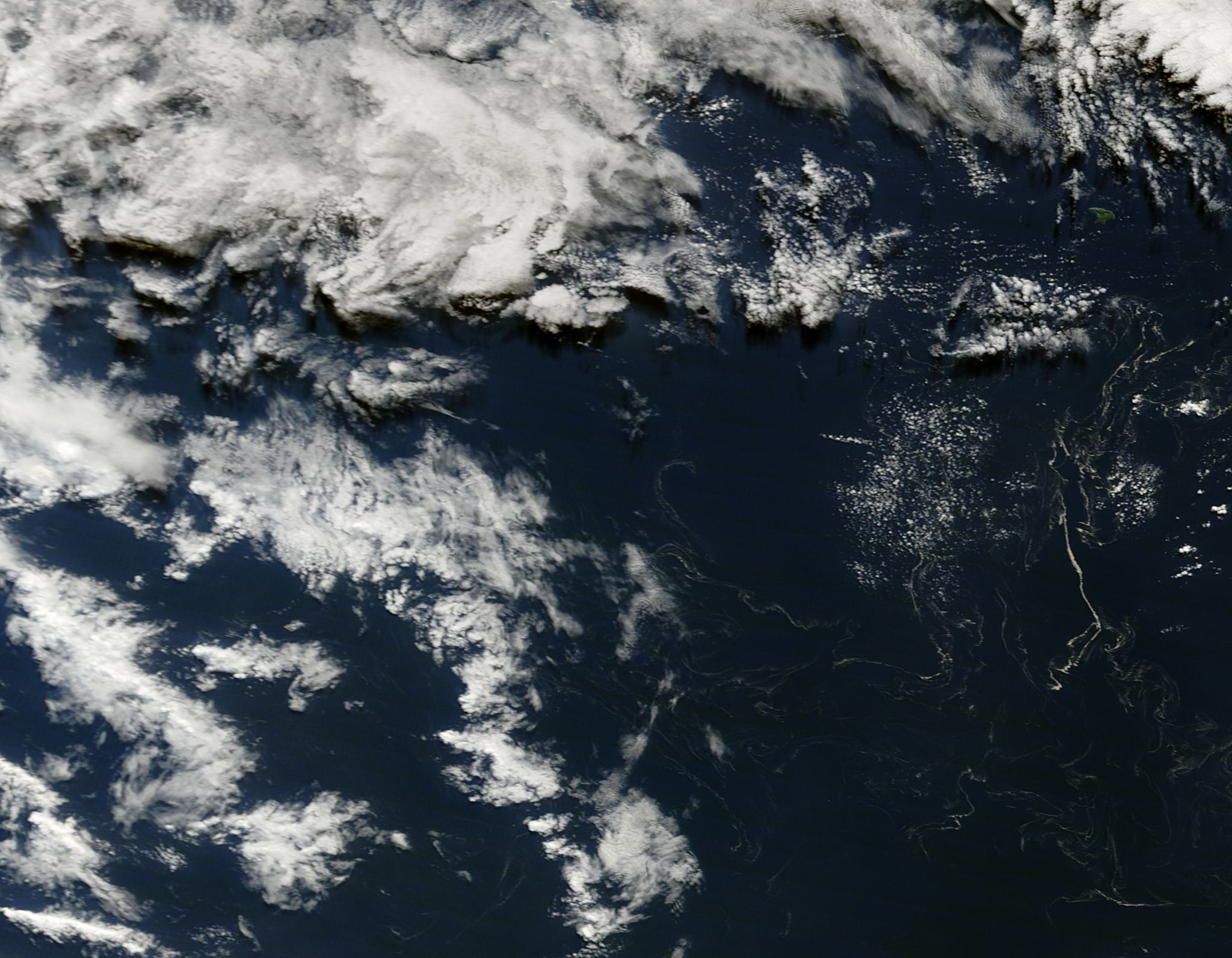
Kermadec Islands pumice raft on 12 August 2012. Raft can be seen as fibrous tendrils primarily in lower right quadrant; Raoul Island can be seen as green dot near upper right.

Scientists were not aware that any eruption had occurred until a huge pumice raft was sighted and photographed at 14:40 NZST on 31 July 2012 by Maggie de Grauw while on a commercial flight from Faleolo, Samoa to Auckland, New Zealand. She emailed her pictures to Dr Scott Bryan, senior research fellow at Queensland University of Technology. After discussion, it was ascertained that the raft was around 1,000 km (600 mi) north of Auckland. Bryan then contacted Olivier Hyvernaud from the Laboratoire de Géophysique, Tahiti, who confirmed the location from Terra/MODIS imagery from NASA. The raft was subsequently sighted by members of the New Zealand Defence Force on 9 August 2012—several weeks after the eruption had occurred. It was spotted by an Orion aircraft and then approached and sampled by the strategic sealift ship HMNZS Canterbury. The pumice raft measured approximately 500 km (300 mi) in length and more than 50 km (30 mi) in width, making the floating island larger in surface area than Israel. An officer in the Royal Australian Navy said that it was "the weirdest thing [he had] seen in 18 years at sea".
