= Clark Range =

Clark Range may refer to the following mountain ranges:

- Clark Range (California), in Yosemite National Park, California
- Clark Mountain Range, in the Mojave Desert, California
- Clark Range (Rocky Mountains), in Alberta, British Columbia and Montana
- Clark Mountains, in Antarctica

== See also ==
- Clarke Range, a part of the Great Dividing Range in Australia
- Clark Seamount, a submarine volcano north of New Zealand
