= Rungapapa Knoll =

Submarine volcano in New Zealand

Location
- Location: Bay of Plenty, New Zealand
- Coordinates: 37.547°S 176.98°E

Geology
- Type: Submarine volcano
- Last eruption: Pleistocene

Rungapapa Knoll, also known as Rungapapa Seamount, is a submarine volcano in New Zealand's Bay of Plenty. It lies 17 km (11 mi) west-southwest of Whakaari / White Island.

The seamount is of Pleistocene age and no eruptions are known to have occurred from it in recorded history. An internal heat source exists inside the volcano.

== See also ==
- List of volcanoes in New Zealand
