= James Healy Seamount =

Submarine volcano in New Zealand's Kermadec Islands

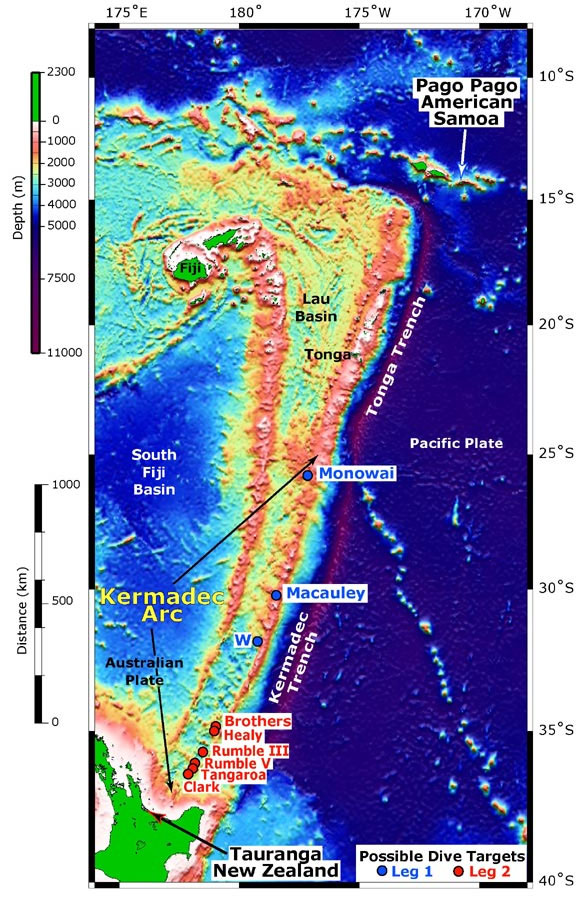
- Geology and map of the Tonga-Kermadec arc
- Location of James Healy Seamount
- Summit depth: −950 m (−3,120 ft)

Location
- Location: In the Kermadec Islands chain
- Coordinates: 35°00.221′S 178°58.357′E

Geology
- Last eruption: 1360

James Healy Seamount (former names Healy Seamount, Healy Volcano) is a submarine volcano located among the South Kermadec Ridge Seamounts south of New Zealand's Kermadec Islands. It consists of a volcanic cone that reaches a depth of 1,150 metres (3,770 ft) below sea level, two 2–2.5-kilometre-wide (1.2–1.6 mi) and 1.3-kilometre-wide (0.81 mi) calderas, and a parasitic cone that reaches a depth of 950 metres (3,120 ft) below sea level. The flanks of the volcano are covered with pumice and volcanic rocks, and hydrothermal venting occurs inside the caldera.

The caldera appears to have formed in one large explosive eruption that may have generated a pumice raft. Parts of the "Loisels Pumice" in New Zealand are suspected to have originated in this eruption, which took place 590±80 years before present (1950). Healy is also suspected to be the source of a tsunami that impacted Maori communities during the 15th century, and may be a continuing tsunami hazard.

== Geography and geology ==
=== Regional ===
The seafloor northeast of New Zealand is dominated by four structures; from east to west, these are the Kermadec Trench, the Kermadec Ridge, the Havre Trough, and the Colville Ridge. In the Kermadec Trench, the Pacific Plate subducts beneath the Australian Plate at a rate of about 52 millimetres per year (2.0 in/year) at the latitude of James Healy Seamount. This gives rise to an island arc-backarc system with subduction in the Kermadec Trench and spreading in the Havre Trough; the latter separates the Kermadec Microplate from the Australia Plate. The subduction process causes the volcanism in the 1,200-kilometre-long (750 mi) Kermadec arc and its northern and southern extensions, the Tofua arc in Tonga and the Taupō Volcanic Zone in New Zealand. Volcanism has moved southeastward during the last five million years, eventually ending up on the current front by 770,000 years ago and producing a bimodal suite of rocks: mostly basalt, but also dacite and rhyolite, in particular during recent eruptions.

About thirteen volcanoes make up the 260-kilometre-long (160 mi) Southern Kermadec Arc, which is the sector of the Tonga-Kermadec arc directly north of New Zealand and better studied than the rest of the arc. Many of the volcanoes are located 15–25 kilometres (9.3–15.5 mi) west of the Kermadec Ridge and reach water depths of less than 1 kilometre (0.62 mi) below sea level. They have erupted rocks like basalt and andesite as lava flows, pillow lavas, and pyroclastic flows as well as their breccia and hyaloclastite counterparts. Seven volcanoes are hydrothermally active and two, Brothers volcano and Healy, feature silicic calderas. Healy is part of a northwest-trending chain of volcanoes, which includes Giljanes, Yokosuka, and Rapuhia.

=== Local ===
Healy volcano, which is also known as James Healy Seamount and named after the geologist James Healy, lies northeast of New Zealand and is wholly submerged. It is a 7-kilometre-wide (4.3 mi) and 15-kilometre-long (9.3 mi) northeast-southwest-trending submarine volcano consisting of three individual edifices, Healy Caldera, Healy Edifice, and Cotton Volcano, and was discovered in 1965 by HMNZS Tui (T234). Healy Caldera is the northeastern 2–2.5-kilometre-wide (1.2–1.6 mi) caldera with a 250–400-metre-high (820–1,310 ft) rim. The central Healy Edifice peaks at 1,150 metres (3,770 ft) below sea level. Southwest of it is a simple cone, Cotton Volcano or Cotton Seamount, peaking at 980 metres (3,220 ft) below sea level. Small cones are found on the southeastern caldera floor. A second caldera, 1.3 kilometres (0.81 mi) wide and 50–100 metres (160–330 ft) deep (below caldera rim), is situated south of Healy Edifice.

The surface of the volcano consists of felsic rock outcrops, lapilli and pyroclastic breccia. About 50 square kilometres (19 sq mi) of the volcano is covered with pumice; most of the flanks are covered with muddy and winnowed sands, pyroclastics, and rarely outcrops. The caldera flanks and floor are covered mainly by lapilli and boulders. There is widespread evidence for ocean-current-driven erosion of bottom sediments both on the slopes of the volcano and in its caldera. The total volume of the volcano is considered to be about 68.9 cubic kilometres (16.5 cu mi).

=== Composition ===
Most of the pumice is white, but about one-fifth is grey and one-twentieth yellow-grey. The fragments have sizes of 10–20 centimetres (3.9–7.9 in) but occasionally exceed 30 centimetres (12 in) and they have a mostly even texture, although some show a wood-like deformed texture. The vesicles are mostly spherical when small and become longer, more complex, and interconnected at larger sizes. Some pumices have pink colours, indicating that they were exposed to air while hot. Mafic blebs have been extracted from the pumices. Healy volcano may feature ore deposits and has been considered a target for mineral prospecting.

Healy is dominantly formed by rhyodacitic rocks, but basalt also occurs; the rocks define a low-potassium suite. Healy pumices contain rare phenocrysts of amphibole, apatite, iron-titanium oxide, and pyroxene. Despite their distinct textures, the various pumice groups have a similar composition. Basaltic rocks have been recovered from the caldera. The formation of silicic magmas in oceanic volcanic arcs has been interpreted either as a consequence of fractional crystallization processes or the remelting of crustal materials, processes which yield similar magma compositions and are thus difficult to distinguish, although an origin through fractional crystallization is possible at Healy. The development of felsic magma and calderas at Healy and some other Kermadec volcanoes appears to be a consequence of a thicker crust which facilitates crustal melting.

== Eruption history ==
Evidence from dredged samples indicates that the Healy caldera formed through one or several catastrophic eruptions. Some rocks may have formed during lava-dome-forming eruptions. While improbable, the Healy caldera may actually be an explosion crater. Data from hydrophones indicate that an eruption took place either at Brothers Seamount or at Healy in 2015.

=== 590 BP eruption ===
The eruption that gave rise to the Healy pumice may have occurred 590 ± 80 years before present (Note: The Global Volcanism Program gives an eruption date of 1360 ± 75 CE, which together with the 590±80 years date implies that the latter refers to 1950 as the base date) (but before 1404 AD). It has been reconstructed to have been a high-volume pyroclastic eruption, which generated an underwater eruption column that did not strongly interact with the surrounding seawater and only featured a minor phreatomagmatic component. The eruption would have occurred at about 500–900 metres (1,600–3,000 ft) depth and involved about 5 cubic kilometres (1.2 cu mi) of pyroclastic material, which formed about 10–15 cubic kilometres (2.4–3.6 cu mi) of pumice and caused the collapse and formation of the Healy Caldera. Part of the eruption column could have risen to the surface, possibly creating a pumice raft that would have been transported to New Zealand by oceanic currents and eddies.

The 590 ± 80 eruption may have triggered a tsunami impacting New Zealand. In northeast New Zealand, tsunami deposits at Henderson Bay, Whangapoua Bay, Waihi Beach, Ohiwa Harbour (both Bay of Plenty), and Tāwharanui Peninsula may be linked to the Healy caldera-forming eruption although the link is not definitive. There is evidence that a tsunami in the 15th century impacted the Maori populations, triggering a shift of settlements from coastal areas to hills; this tsunami may have originated from Healy caldera or correlate to a 1420 tsunami in Japan. Other prehistoric tsunamis in New Zealand may have been caused by activity or collapses of Healy volcano or of other volcanoes in the Kermadec arc.

==== Loisels Pumice ====
Sea-rafted pumices are common in New Zealand. A common pumice formation found in northern New Zealand and the Chatham Islands 900 kilometres (560 mi) farther east was identified in 1962 and named the "Loisels Pumice" after the beach where it was identified. This pumice has a scientific importance stemming from its age, which directly post-dates the arrival of Maori people on New Zealand and can be used to correlate coastal sites. Pumices that may be part of the Loisels Pumice have been found as far as Fraser Island in Australia although this identification is debatable.

The composition and finding places of Loisels Pumice strongly imply that it was the product of volcanic eruptions in the Tonga-Kermadec arc rather than of volcanism on the New Zealand landmass. While it was originally assumed that it stemmed from a single eruptive event, chemical and chronological considerations imply that it is the product of multiple volcanic events. One set of Loisels Pumice has an appearance and composition similar to the Healy pumices and probably originated there; they might have been transported onto land by tsunamis. Alternatively, the Loisels Pumice may have been formed by an earlier, pre-caldera eruption of Healy.

=== Hydrothermal activity ===
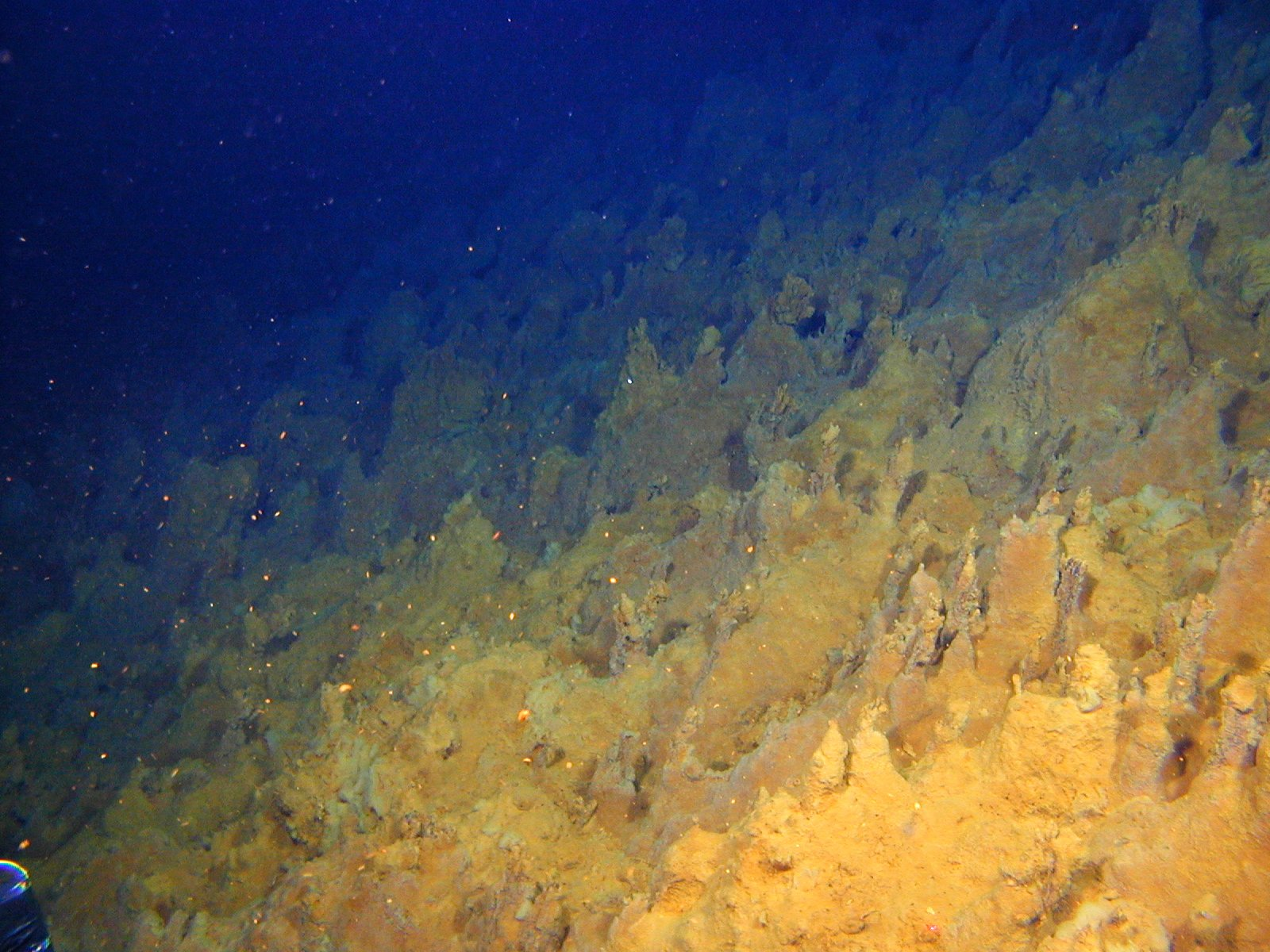
Microbial mats on Healy

Hydrothermal venting occurs on the southern floor of Healy Caldera and produces metal-rich discharges and iron oxide mounds. There is no evidence for hydrothermal activity at Cotton, and unlike all other Kermadec arc volcanoes, there are no known chemosynthetic animal communities at Healy.

The hydrothermal activity gives rise to a particular plume above the volcano and to numerous submarine plumes mostly linked to the caldera and its walls. Together with the Brothers volcano, Healy is one of the two most hydrothermally active volcanoes of the southern Kermadec arc. If the southern Kermadec arc is representative of hydrothermal emissions from volcanic arcs elsewhere in the world, then such emissions may constitute a significant part of the global hydrothermal budget.

=== Hazards ===
A tsunami-generating eruption of Healy has been considered in disaster modelling scenarios of cities in northern New Zealand. A Krakatau-like eruption at Healy could result in a tsunami comparable to that resulting from an earthquake in the Kermadec trench with maximum wave heights of several metres in the Bay of Plenty and elsewhere along northeastern New Zealand. However, the present-day risk for a repeat of such an event is low.

== See also ==
- List of volcanoes in New Zealand
