= Whakatāne Seamount =

Whakatāne
- Location within New Zealand Location within North Island
- Summit depth: −900 metres (−3,000 ft)
- Height: 1,200 metres (3,900 ft)
- Translation: (from Māori)

Location
- Range: Kermadec Arc
- Coordinates: 36°49′S 177°28′E

Geology
- Type: Submarine volcano

Whakatāne Seamount (also known as Whakatāne Volcano) is a submarine stratovolcano situated some 130 kilometres (81 mi) off the Bay of Plenty coastline of New Zealand. It is found within the Kermadec Arc, and is one of the northernmost volcanoes of the Taupō Volcanic Zone and is usually recognised as the most southern of the South Kermadec Ridge Seamounts. The seamount rises some 1,200 metres (3,900 ft) from the seafloor, and reaches 900 metres (3,000 ft) below sea level at its highest point.

== See also ==
- List of volcanoes in New Zealand
