= Havre Seamount =

Volcanic seamount in the Kermadec Islands group

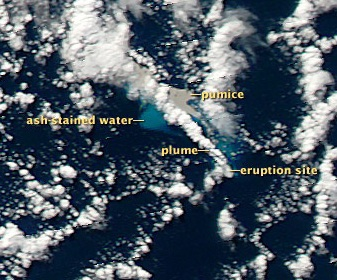
- Satellite image of 2012 eruption

- Location within Oceania
- Summit depth: 720 m (2,400 ft)
- Height: 1,030 m (3,400 ft)

Location
- Location: South Pacific Ocean
- Group: Kermadec Islands
- Coordinates: 31.11°S 179.00°W
- Country: New Zealand

Geology
- Type: Seamount
- Last eruption: July 2012

Havre Seamount is an active volcanic seamount lying within the Kermadec Islands group of New Zealand, in the south-west Pacific Ocean, on the Tonga-Kermadec Ridge. Its most recent eruption took place in July 2012.

== See also ==
- Monowai (seamount)
