= Faleolo =

Coordinates: 13°50′4.48″S 171°59′32.03″W

Faleolo is a village on the island of Upolu in Samoa. The village is just south of Faleolo International Airport and is part of A'ano Alofi 4 Electoral Constituency (Faipule District) which forms part of the larger A'ana political district.

As of the 2021 census, the population is 15.
