= Monowai (seamount) =

Volcanic seamount north of New Zealand

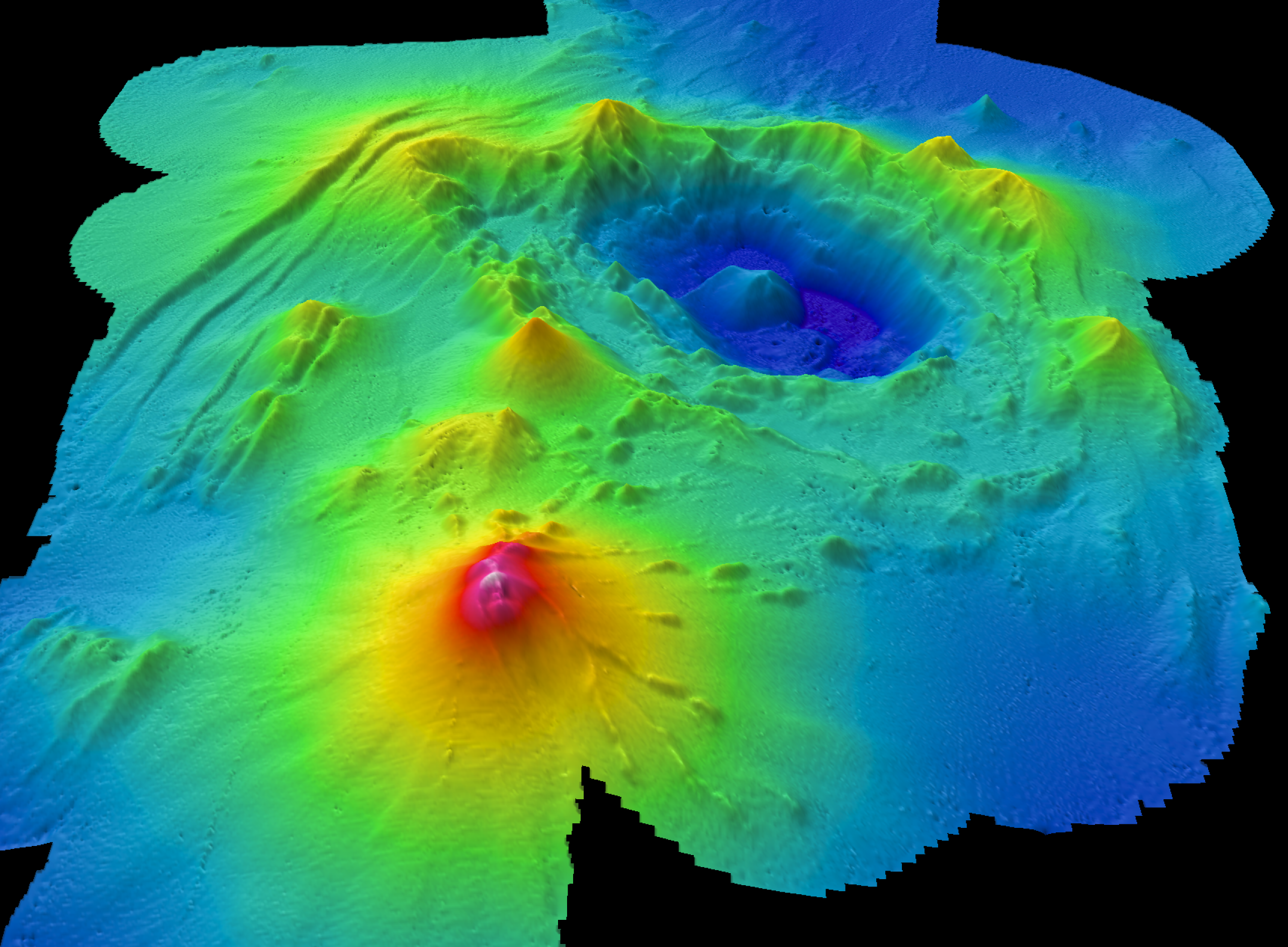
- Three-dimensional view of Monowai Volcanic Centre as seen from the south, showing both the Monowai Seamount cone and Monowai Caldera

- Location within Oceania
- Summit depth: 100 metres (330 ft)
- Height: 1,200 metres (3,900 ft)
- Translation: Channel full of water (named for HMNZS Monowai) (from Māori)

Location
- Location: Kermadec Ridge, South Pacific Ocean
- Coordinates: 25.89°S 177.18°W
- Country: New Zealand

Geology
- Volcanic arc/chain: Kermadec Arc
- Age of rock: ~780,000 years
- Last eruption: 2017

History
- Discovery date: 1877-1924

Monowai Seamount is a volcanic seamount to the north of New Zealand. It is formed by a large caldera and a volcanic cone just south-southeast from the caldera. The volcanic cone rises to depths of up to 100 metres (330 ft) but its depth varies with ongoing volcanic activity, including sector collapses and the growth of lava domes. The seamount and its volcanism were discovered after 1877, but only in 1980 was it named "Monowai" after a research ship of the same name.

The subduction of the Pacific plate beneath the Australia plate has given rise to volcanic and hydrothermal activity on the Kermadec Ridge that Monowai is part of. The volcano is located at the site where the Osbourn Trough and the Louisville seamount chain subduct in the Tonga Trench and this subduction process probably has influenced its volcanism. Monowai is one of the most active volcanoes in the Kermadec volcanic arc, with many eruptions since 1977, and perhaps the most active submarine volcano in the world. Volcanic activity is characterised by the emission of gas and discolouration of water, along with seismic activity and a substantial growth rate of the volcano. The ongoing hydrothermal activity has also been observed and hydrothermal vents on Monowai feature a rich variety of fauna.

== Discovery and research history ==
Volcanic activity at Monowai Seamount was discovered between 1877 and 1924, and a shoal was first noted in 1944 (although this may constitute a misinterpreted pumice raft or disturbance of the water.) Monowai Seamount was first recognized to be a volcano in 1977 and was named in 1980 after the research ship HMNZS Monowai (A06). The caldera was discovered only in 2004. The volcano has been dredged and further investigated by the submersibles Pisces V and ROPOS and various research cruises. The name was formally adopted in 2017; the seamount is also informally known as "Orion seamount".

== Geography and structure ==
=== Regional ===
Monowai Seamount lies at the northern end of the Kermadec Arc north of New Zealand, in the Southwestern Pacific Ocean about halfway between Tonga and the Kermadec Islands. The Kermadec Arc is the southern part of the about 2,500 kilometres (1,600 mi) long Tonga-Kermadec arc; this volcanic arc contains about 12 volcanic islands and at least 37 submarine volcanoes, which occur about every 50 kilometres (31 mi). Many of these volcanoes were only recently discovered and are poorly studied; hydrothermal activity has been observed at many. The Osbourn Trough and the Louisville seamount chain are being subducted close to Monowai Seamount and might have influenced the development of the seamount and the volcanic arc and back-arc in general. Monowai Seamount is one of the most active volcanoes in the Kermadec arc; two other active volcanoes are Raoul Island and Rumble III while Clark, Rumble V, Healy, Brothers, Volcano-W, Macauley, and Giggenbach are hydrothermally active.

=== Local ===
Monowai Seamount is a large volcano which consists of an 8 kilometres (5.0 mi) wide conical stratovolcano that rises 1.2 kilometres (0.75 mi) from the Tonga-Kermadec Ridge in a part of the ocean with a depth of 1,000–1,500 metres (3,300–4,900 ft) to a depth of less than 100 metres (330 ft) below sea level; the exact depth of the summit is subject to changes owing to the ongoing volcanic activity. This activity is also responsible for frequent changes in its morphology with up to 176 metres (577 ft) height variation recorded between surveys made in 1998, 2004 and 2007. Recent volcanic activity has smoothed the slopes of the Monowai Seamount and covered them with lapilli sand and scoria in some places. Migration of the summit vent has formed a 1.2 kilometres (0.75 mi) long ridge at the top of Monowai Seamount, and aligned vents and radial ridges occur on its slopes as well.

To its north-northeast lies a large and deep caldera that is elongated in the northwest-southeast direction; the Monowai Seamount as a whole has a similar elongation. The caldera appears to consist of two nested calderas, the outer of which is the largest in the northern Kermadec arc with a surface area of 84 square kilometres (32 sq mi). although an origin as one single long-lived caldera is also possible. This caldera is the largest in the Kermadec volcanic arc.

The rim of the caldera lies at a depth of about 500–1,000 metres (1,600–3,300 ft). Parasitic cones occur around the caldera, and a cone is also found within the inner caldera and appears to be about 250 metres (820 ft) high resurgent dome; additional cones can be found on the caldera floor which is covered by sediments. On Mussel Ridge, a ridge located within the caldera and close to its southwestern margin, seafloor observations have found cemented volcanic ash, dispersed rocks, mud, pillow lavas, pillow tube lavas, and talus. Another about 500 metres (1,600 ft) high cone is situated between the Monowai cone and the caldera. Both Monowai Seamount and Monowai Caldera rise from a lava shield and the entire volcanic complex covers an area of about 530 square kilometres (200 sq mi).

Hydrothermal activity including venting at temperatures of less than 60 °C (140 °F) occurs at Mussel Ridge where several low-temperature vents can be found; additional venting occurs on the Monowai Seamount main cone and satellite vents on its flanks; deep hydrothermal plumes hint at additional vents at greater depths. In addition to "true" hydrothermal fluids, the slopes of Monowai are the sources of non-hydrothermal plumes that probably originate from landslides or when material is remobilized by eruptions.

== Geology ==
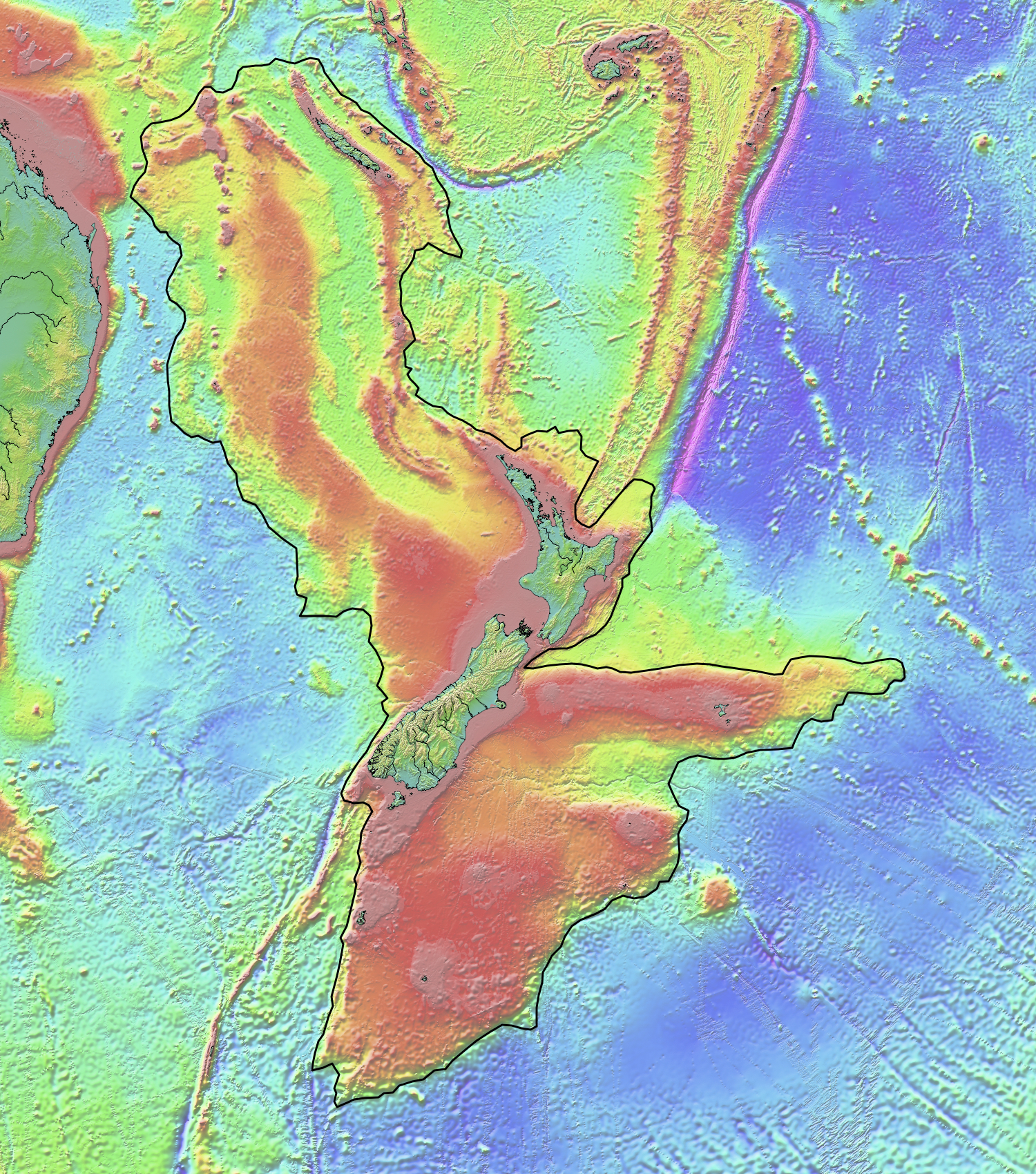
The Monowai Seamount in its seafloor geological context.

Subduction of the Pacific plate beneath the Australian plate occurs at a rate of 24 centimetres per year (9.4 in/year), at a rate that decreases towards the south, and is responsible for the volcanism in the Kermadec arc. Behind the trench back-arc, spreading takes place at a rate of 15.9–1.5 centimetres per year (6.26–0.59 in/year) also with a southwards decreasing tendency.

Other volcanic centres close to Monowai Seamount are the Hinepuia centre about 49 kilometres (30 mi) south-southwest and the "U" volcanic centre about 48 kilometres (30 mi) farther north. Less than 100 kilometres (62 mi) north lies Volcano-19, which has erupted basaltic andesite and is hydrothermally active.

The basement that Monowai Seamount is constructed on may be the same as the one underpinning the rest of the Kermadec Ridge – compacted Miocene to Oligocene volcanic sediments above an Eocene volcanic arc which in the area of Monowai Seamount form a graben structure. Several faults that occur west of the volcano relate to the developing graben and additional faults dissect the volcano, including ring faults that surround the caldera. The faults that dissect the Monowai Seamount have strikes and trends comparable to those of other volcanoes in the central Kermadec arc.

The Kermadec arc has been active for the past 1 million years. About 5–6 million years ago, the Lau-Havre backarc trough opened up and separated the Kermadec arc from the Colville-Lau arc, where volcanic activity ceased about 5-3.5 million years ago. The subduction of the Louisville seamount chain appears to have altered the behaviour of the backarc since north of the subducting area the Lau Basin is undergoing full-fledged seafloor spreading while the Havre Trough south of the subducting area only features short rift segments.

=== Composition ===
Monowai Seamount has erupted rocks ranging from andesite and basaltic andesite, both mainly around the caldera, to basalt which makes up the bulk of Monowai cone. Dredged samples contain phenocrysts of clinopyroxene, olivine, and plagioclase and define a mainly mafic rock suite, which is unusual for a large caldera. Ultimately, the magmas originate from partial melting of the mantle wedge beneath the Australian plate and the mixing of water-rich and water-poor melts in a magma chamber. Magma evolution processes occurring in the magma chamber at temperatures of 1,080–1,200 °C (1,980–2,190 °F) eventually yielded the andesites from a basaltic parental melt.

On Mussel Ridge, hydrothermal alteration of rocks has produced several minerals like alunite, amorphous silica, anhydrite, barite, chalcopyrite, cristobalite, magnetite, marcasite, natroalunite, natrojarosite, pyrite, pyrophyllite, smectite, and native sulfur; in some places, the volcanic rocks have been entirely replaced by alteration products. Hyaloclastic rocks have also been observed.

== Biology ==
The hydrothermal vents on Mussel Ridge features a rich life characterised by sea anemones, crabs, crustaceans, fish, mussels, polychaetes, shrimps, sponges and tube worms; mussel beds can be so thick that the seafloor disappears below them. Fish and mussels have been observed on Monowai Seamount cone as well and rhizocephalan parasitic barnacles have been found at certain unspecified vents. Chemicals exhalated by the Monowai Seamount are used by microbes to produce organic material through a process known as chemosynthesis, and these microbes are a food source for animals. Additionally, phytoplankton has been observed to grow after eruptions when the fallout from Monowai Seamount fertilises the waters.

== Eruption history ==
The chronology of volcanic activity at Monowai Seamount is largely unknown given the absence of available dating; it is not known, for example, whether the two nested calderas formed during the same eruption. However, the parasitic cones appear to be older than the caldera and the main Monowai Seamount cone and most of the volcanic complex probably formed within the last 780,000 years. The formation of the caldera most likely occurred in a nonexplosive fashion and regional tectonic processes may be involved. The caldera formation was probably followed by the formation of the resurgent dome and the cone between the Monowai Seamount and Monowai Caldera, with a trend towards a more explosive activity.

Present-day activity occurs at the top of Monowai Seamount, and manifests itself in the form of earthquakes, discoloured water, emission of gases and pumice rafts, rumbling sounds and upwelling water. Underwater, this activity generates cones, debris flows, lava flows and pyroclastic flows as well as sector collapses and lava dome growth, which has caused the summit of Monowai Seamount to shift southward. Several seismic swarms have been observed on Monowai Seamount, including a strong swarm in May 2002 that may be associated with a sector collapse, and sound waves from the volcano have been recorded as far aways as Ascension Island in the Atlantic Ocean. Monowai Seamount is a fast-growing edifice, with growth rates ranging between 0.004–0.02 cubic kilometres per year (0.00096–0.00480 mi^{3}/a). Monowai Seamount's magma output rate reaches 0.63 cubic kilometres per year (0.15 mi^{3}/a) during some periods and exceeds that of many oceanic volcanoes such as Hawaii; this fast growth is accompanied by cyclical landslides and sector collapses that redistribute material down its slopes. These landslides, while much smaller than comparable landslides at other volcanoes, appear to occur at a very high frequency. Such submarine landslides can lead to tsunamis; there is however no evidence for tsunamis triggered by eruptions at Monowai Seamount.

Early observations of volcanic activity at Monowai Seamount occurred in 1977 and 1978. The last eruption sequence may have occurred in October 2014 or May 2016, when pumice rafts and water discolouration were observed, respectively. Both events were accompanied by seismic episodes which indicate that between April 2014 and January 2017 there were about two eruptions per month. Monowai Seamount may be the most active submarine volcano in the world.
