= Brothers Seamount =

Submarine volcano in the Kermadec Arc, north east of New Zealand

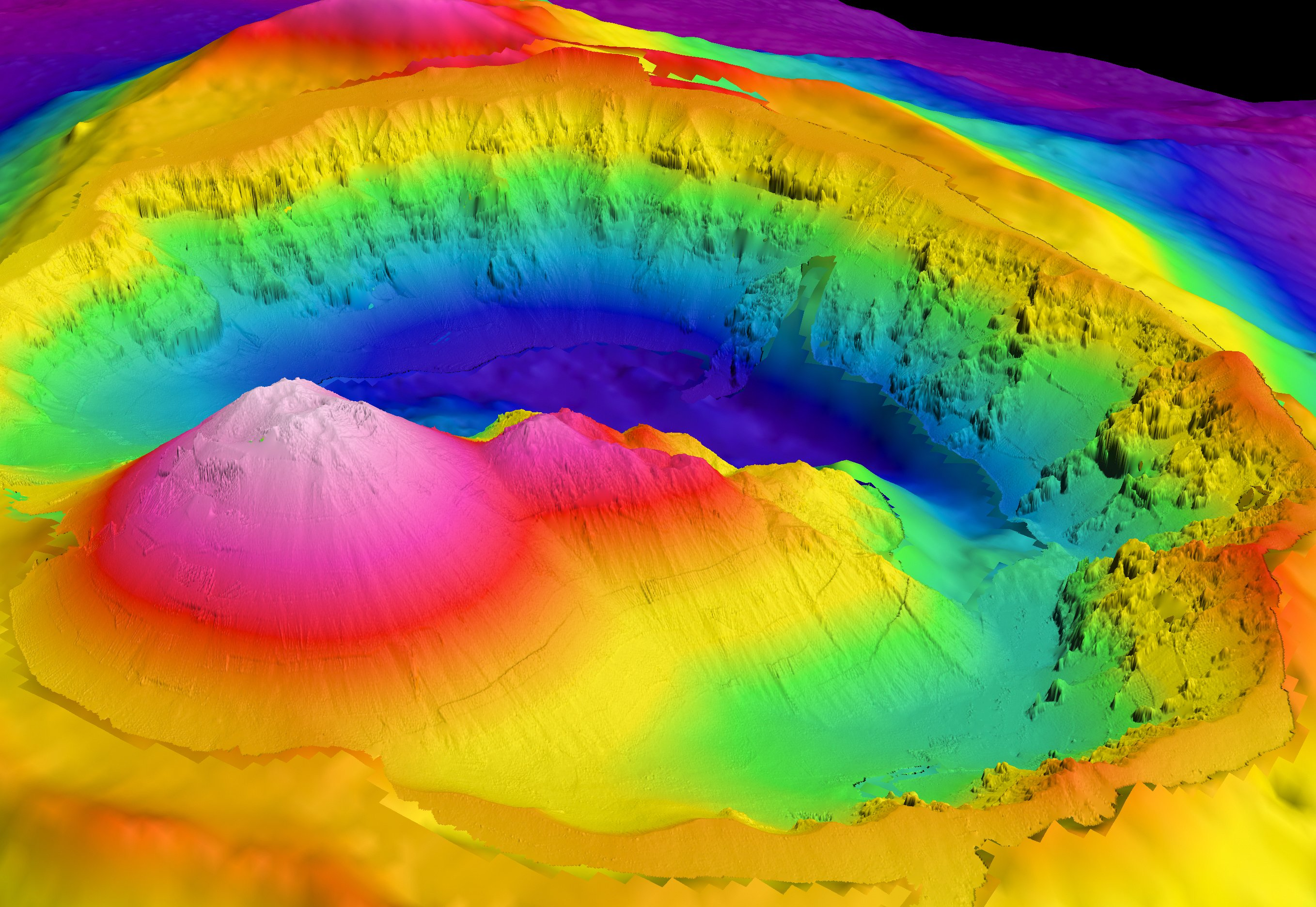
- Brothers Volcano as looking into the caldera from the south
- Location of Brothers Seamount
- Summit depth: 1,350 m (4,430 ft)

Location
- Coordinates: 34.875°S 179.075°E

Geology
- Type: Submarine volcano
- Last eruption: Unknown

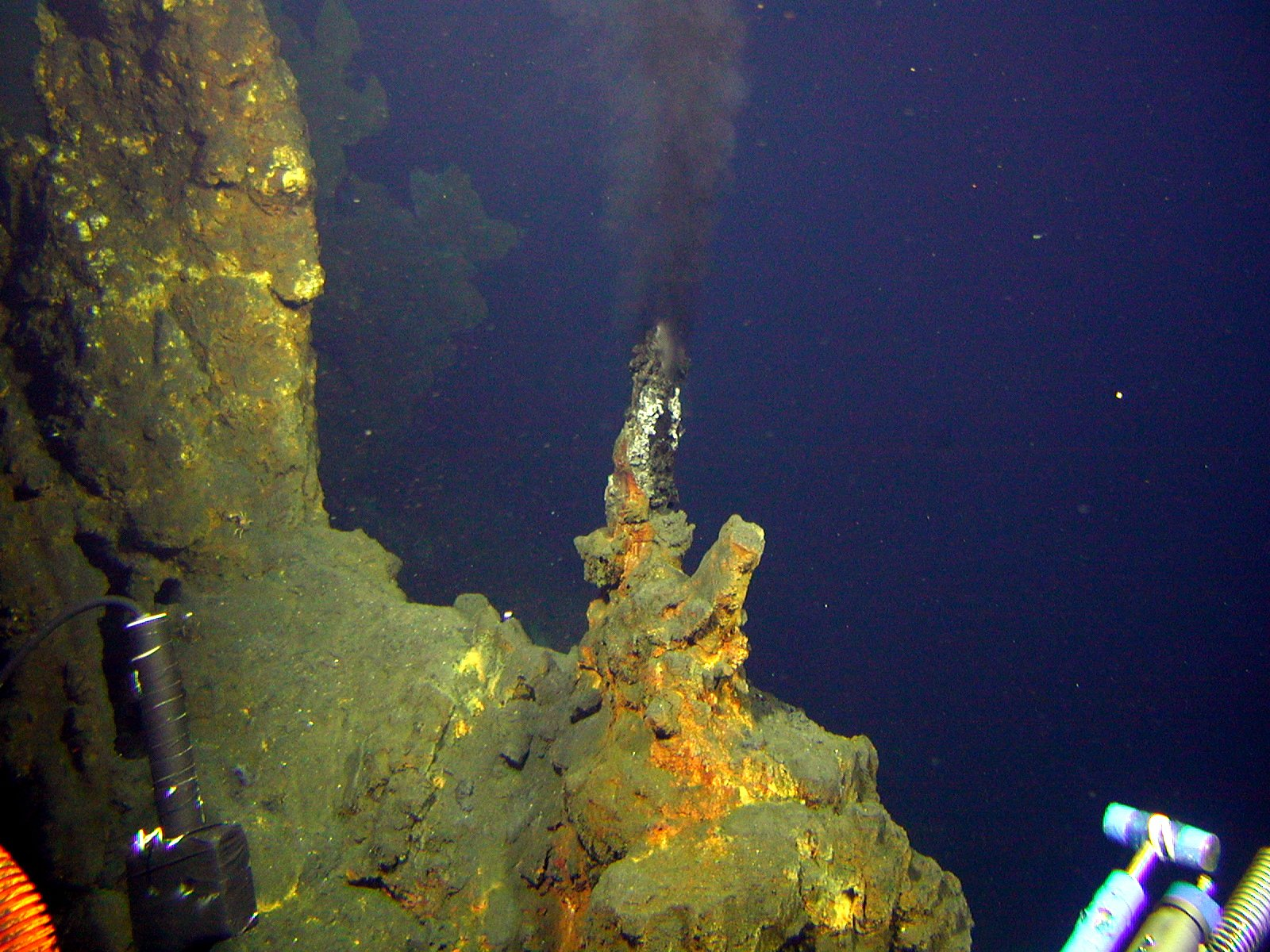
"Black Smoker" Chimneys

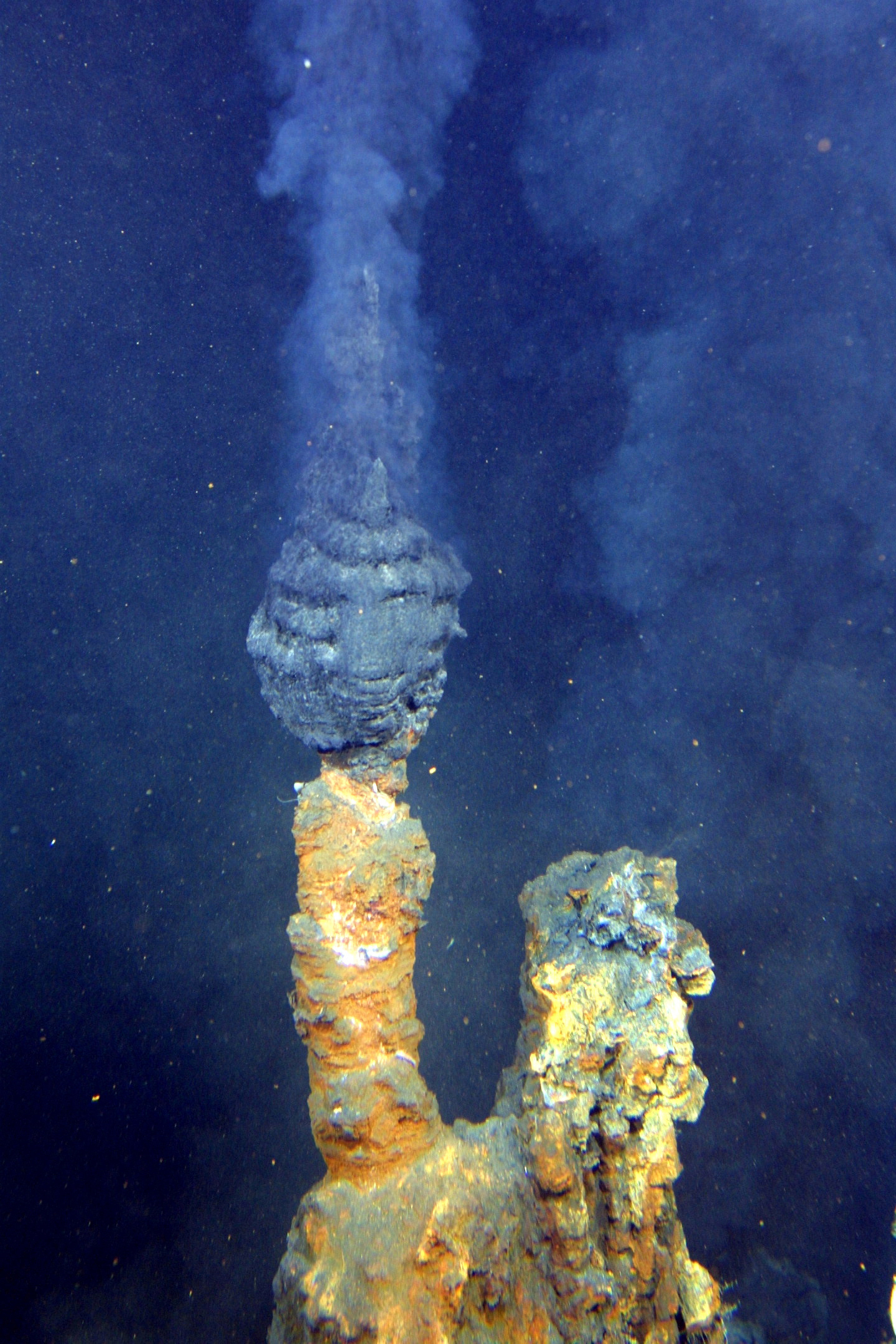

The Brothers Seamount (also Brothers Volcano) is a Pacific Ocean submarine volcano in the Kermadec Arc, 340 kilometres (210 mi) north east of New Zealand's Whakaari/White Island. It is one of the South Kermadec Ridge Seamounts.

== Geology ==
It was formed by volcanic activity within a graben structure delimited by regional faults created by subduction of the Pacific Plate under the Australian Plate. Within its oval outline, which measures 13 by 8 kilometres (8.1 by 5.0 mi), it contains a 3 km (1.9 mi) wide caldera with walls 300–500 metres (980–1,640 ft) high. It is three times bigger than Whakaari / White Island. A dacite dome named the Upper Cone rises 350 m from the caldera floor (which lies 1850 m below sea level), with a smaller dome just to its northeast. There is now detailed magnetic anomaly mapping of the Brothers caldera with very extreme range variation from −2000 to +2000 nT. Such mapping has shown that the local magnetic highs correlate with the morphology of the caldera, in particular its rim and the Upper Cone, whereas magnetic lows correlate with zones of hydrothermal activity and/or alteration of the rocks by the hydrothermal fluids.

=== Hydrothermal activity ===
The caldera walls and the larger dome host numerous hydrothermal vents, which send plumes of hot water 750 m up through the water column. It is the most hydrothermally active volcano known in the Kermadec Arc. These hydrothermal vents are also known as hot springs and have created an 8 meter high field of "black smoker" chimneys. These chimneys are created when the hydrothermal fluids hit the cold water and the chemicals in solution are deposited. The hydrothermal fluids are an energy source to many unique species of organisms like tubeworms and bacteria. The marine life and minerals found from these chimneys are beneficial to New Zealand's economy and biotechnology industry. It is likely that the richest mineral deposits should be in the caldera rim and walls.

Two main types of hydrothermal activity exist:

1. In the Upper Caldera and NW-Caldera high temperature hydrothermal vents exist with medium gas enrichment and the formation of Cu-Zn-Au-rich chimneys
2. At the Upper and Lower Cones lower temperature (< 120 °C) diffuse venting of very gaseous acidic sulfate containing fluids

== History ==
It is still unknown when the Brothers Volcano last erupted, but the crater walls tell us that it had an eruption sequence that was so explosive that it caused the volcano to blow out a caldera. Drill samples of hydrothermally altered volcanoclastics products and lava flows of dacitic composition show a two stage history:

1. Pre-caldera collapse with magmatic activity, including a dominant magmatic-hydrothermal system of acid sulfhate fluids, magmatic volatiles and metal rich brines, followed by
2. Post-caldera collapse with the growth of the resurgent Upper and Lower Cones, and new magmatic hydrothermal activity.

This sequence was established by a joint expedition by the United States, New Zealand and Germany that mapped the volcano in detail in 2007, and cores of the volcano and its hydrothermal systems that were taken during IODP Expedition 376 (D/V JOIDES Resolution, May–July 2018).

== Monitoring ==
Submarine volcanoes are not monitored by any organization, but have become a central interest in current expeditions.

== See also ==
- List of volcanoes in New Zealand
