= Clark Seamount =

Submarine volcano near New Zealand

Clark
- Location within New Zealand
- Summit depth: −860 m (−2,820 ft)

Location
- Location: ~130 km northeast of Whakaari / White Island
- Coordinates: 36.466°S 177.839°E
- Country: New Zealand

Geology
- Volcanic arc/chain: South Kermadec Ridge Seamounts
- Last eruption: Unknown

History
- Discovery date: June 1992

Clark is a dormant submarine volcano located off the northern coast of New Zealand and is one of the South Kermadec Ridge Seamounts.

== History ==
The first evidence of the existence of Clark was found during 1988 GLORIA side-scan mapping. These interpretations were later confirmed via photography and oceanic dredging in early 1992 during the 3-week Rapuhia cruise.

In 2006, during a New Zealand-American NOAA Vents Program expedition, sulfide chimneys and diffuse hydrothermal venting were observed.

There have been no known eruptions of Clark.

== See also ==
- List of volcanoes in New Zealand
- Tonga-Kermadec Ridge
- Submarine volcano
