= Havre Trough =

Oceanic rift valley in the south-west Pacific Ocean to the north of New Zealand

Approximate surface projection on Pacific Ocean of Havre Trough

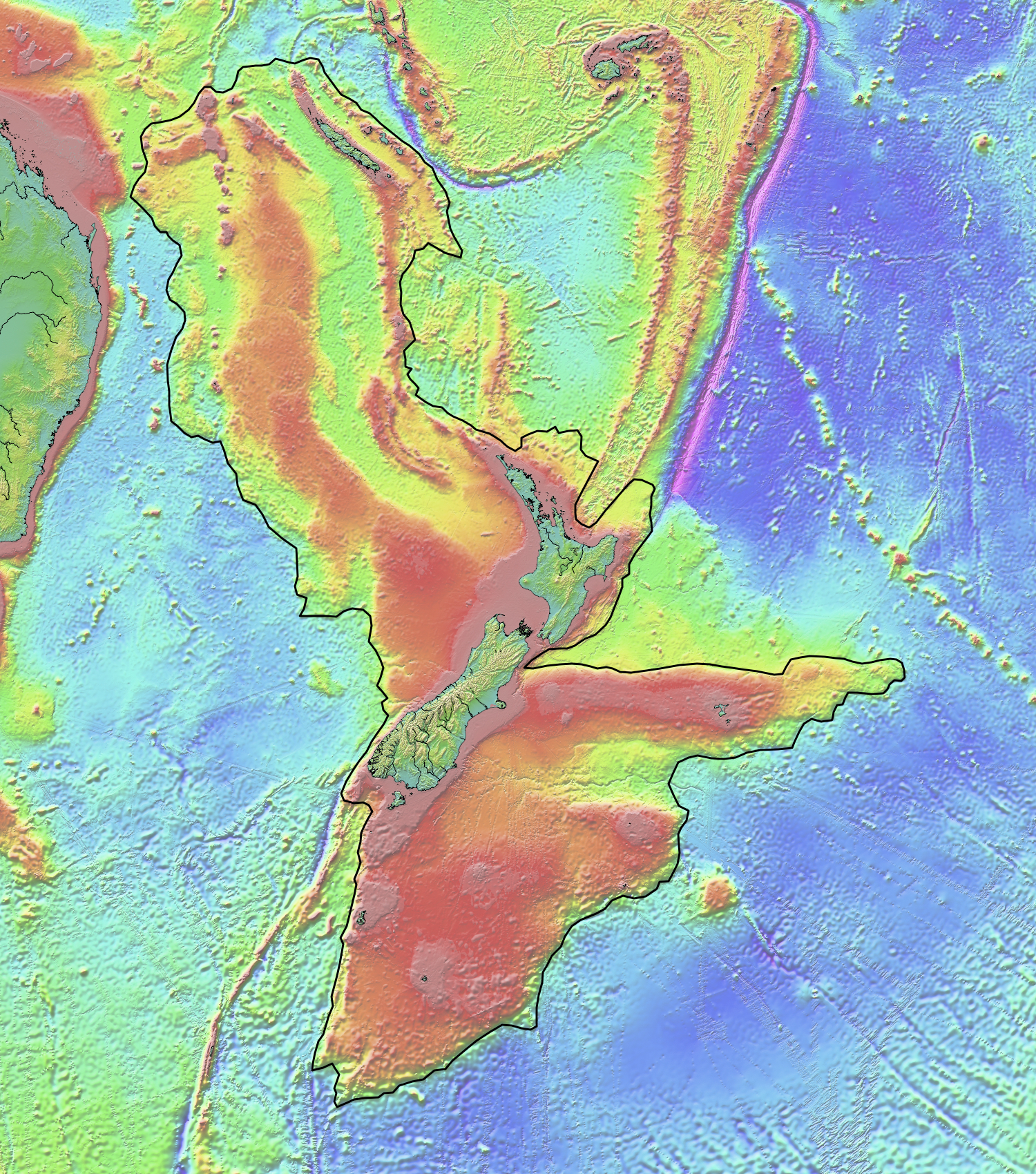
Geological relationships of the Havre Trough.

The Havre Trough (Havre Basin) is a currently actively rifting back-arc basin about 100 km (62 mi) to 120 km (75 mi) wide, between the Australian Plate and Kermadec microplate. The trough extends northward from New Zealand's offshore Taupō Volcanic Zone commencing at Zealandia's continental shelf margin and continuing as a tectonic feature, as the Lau Basin which currently contains active seafloor spreading centers. Its eastern margin is defined by the Kermadec Ridge created by Pacific Plate subduction under the Kermadec microplate, while the western margin is the remnant Lau-Colville Ridge.

== Geology ==
The Havre Trough is characterised by a number of basins up to 3.7 km (2.3 mi) deep in the south, with several more shallow volcanic edifices that may rise to within 2.5 km (1.6 mi) of the ocean surface. It is a back-arc domain where rifting is universally oblique to the bounding ridges and consists of rifted horsts and grabens, extrusive magmatism and partially sedimented rifts. The western basins have flat floors and sediment in fills typically 0.4 km (0.25 mi) to 0.8 km (0.50 mi) thick consistent with little current extension activity. The thickest sediments in the Havre Trough are up to 1.5 km (0.93 mi) thick. There is no clear spreading ridge like those found in the Lau Basin. Magnetic anomaly mapping shows definite zones. However seismic sections show a buried ridge under the sediments. The eastern basins in the trough are shallower, and associated with evidence of active extension including little sedimentary cover, high heat flow, shallow seismicity, poorly defined magnetic zones and lavas with a more pronounced island arc basalt signature as one moves west to east towards the active volcanism of the Kermadec Ridge. At about 20°S the Australian Plate's crust is 10 km (6.2 mi) to 13 km (8.1 mi) thick which is thinner than the 16 km (9.9 mi) oceanic crust of the Kermadec Plate under the Kermadec Ridge. Further south the crust might thin to 5 km (3.1 mi) at the deepest basins. The most southern basin feature is the Ngatoro Rift at 36.5°S and comprising the trough's rifting tip which propagates the oceanic back‐arc into the New Zealand continental margin where it continues as the Taupō Rift and New Zealand's Taupō Volcanic Zone. The present active rifting is occurring in an area between the Colville Ridge and the Kermadec Ridge that at the most 15 km (9.3 mi) wide. The present rifting extension rate is between 15 mm (0.59 in)/year and 25 mm (0.98 in)/year, which should be viewed in context of the south to north trend of higher rates to the north and that the age of some basalt samples imply about a three times faster extension rate than this for the Havre Trough. Indeed, the Lau Basin to the north has extension rates that increase from 48 mm (1.9 in)/year to as much as 120 mm (4.7 in)/year at its north. The Lau Basin is separated from the Havre Trough by an intermediate uplifted region. This is north west of where the Louisville Ridge seamounts are being subducted under the Indo-Australian Plate. The Tonga-Kermadac Ridge volcanics are very active in this area north of the Monowai seamount. Two other prominent basins within the trough are the Ngatoroirangi Rift at 33.5°S, and the Rumble Rift at 35.5°S. The prominent Rumble V Ridge cross‐chain of arc volcanism is found at about 36°S. The trough is less studied further from New Zealand.

=== Earthquakes ===
There is fair activity, especially in the eastern portion of the Havre Trough. At about 30°S there is a cluster of intermediate depth (200 km (120 mi) to 450 km (280 mi)) earthquakes reflecting seismology of the subducted slab.

=== Volcanism ===
Map of current volcanic activity near the Harve Trough. Back arc rifting and spreading centers are shown as red lines.

The volcanic dredged samples from within the trough are mainly basalts or basaltic andesites in contrast to the andesite and dacite samples from the Kermadec Ridge arc front. This is consistent with the ambient mantle wedge under the Havre Trough being Pacific during its current rifting stage of backarc development. Basalts range from having almost no subduction influence, to significant influence at rear arc volcanoes. The oldest dredged samples are as expected over 100 million years old, but most are far younger and there is compositional variation. Some are about the 5 million years of the arc ridges but most scattered across the trough are even younger. To date only two samples from the trough, close to the Colville Ridge, have any compositional relationship to the proto arc (Vitiaz Arc). However at 30°S in the middle of the trough a caldera volcano has been found that is rhyolitic, and erupted 52,000 year ago. The only other known example of alkali rhyolite in an active intraoceanic backarc basin is Mayor Island. Samples from the Rumble V Ridge are aged less than 110,000 years and the Ngatoro Rift have ages between 200,000 years and 680,000 years. The slightly more northern back arc Gill volcano which is towards the western area of the trough north of the Rumbles V Ridge has ages between 880,000 and 1.19 million years ago, while the Rapuhia Ridge, which extends southwest from the Rapuhia volcano in the centre of the Havre Trough, so can be regarded as part of the rifting line has much younger ages of between 50,000 and 110,000 years ago. Four hundred and fifty miles to the north of the Gill volcano, in the western Harve Trough a basaltic volcanic sample was dated at 1.1 ± 0.4 Ma. Further there are three eastern Havre Trough dredged samples none of which is older than 150,000 years ago.

=== Tectonics ===
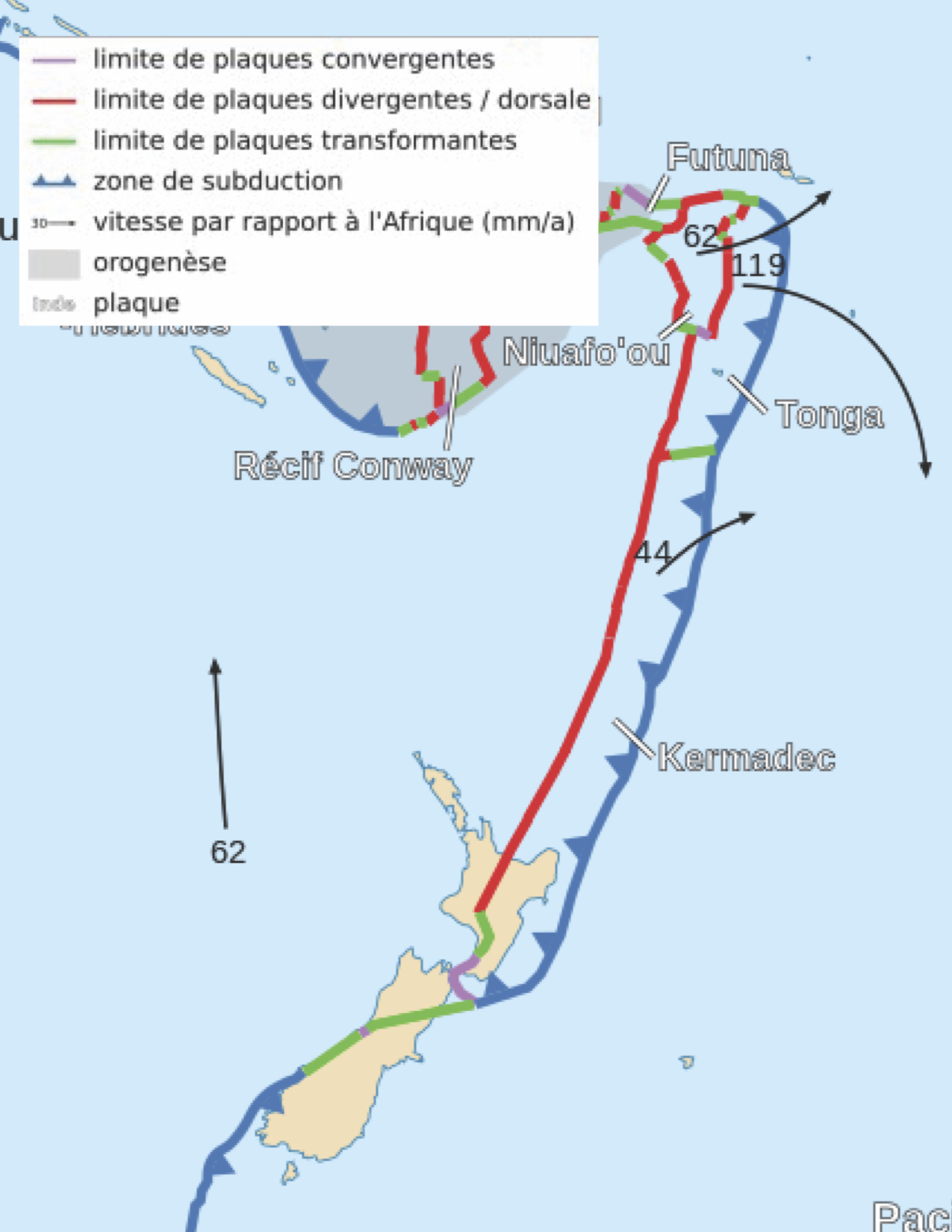
Kermadec and Tonga microplates to provide context to the Havre Trough which is at the boundary between the Australian plate and the Kermadec Plate shown here by the red line northwards from New Zealand

The subducting Pacific plate lies between 170 km (110 mi) to 450 km (280 mi) beneath the Havre Trough between 28°S to 35°S. South of the Rapuhia Scarp at 35°S it is thought that the Hikurangi Plateau volcanics which are up to 15 km (9.3 mi) thick are subducting and this remnant of a Cretaceous Large Igneous Province changes erupted volcanic composition above it.

It is now thought seafloor spreading at the Havre Trough started about 5.5 to 5.0 million years ago in response to the rollback of the subducting Pacific Plate and terminated abruptly about 3.0 to 2.5 million years ago In the western Havre Trough the evidence for historic seafloor spreading is believed to have resulted from the initial phase of extension after the break-up of the original proto-Colville-Kermadec arc (Vitiaz Arc). However rifting and volcanism is currently still active and some of the volcanic data suggests significant parts of the trough may only have formed of the order of a million years ago or less. This means the rate of spreading and thus recent tectonics will not be resolved without drill sampling and other studies. Whatever the eastern part of the trough is a young seismologically and volcanically active tectonic feature, but it is premature to think all the western part is older given the volcanic samples obtained to date.
