= South Kermadec Ridge Seamounts =

Volcanic geological feature

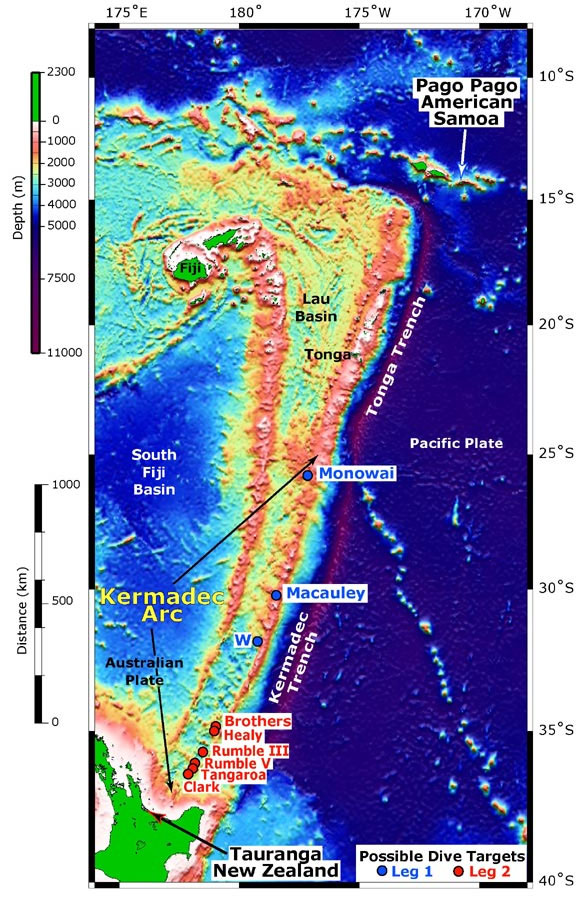
- Bathymetry of the Kermadec volcanic island arc and surrounding areas

Location
- Location: South Pacific Ocean
- Coordinates: 35°30′S 178°12′E

Geology
- Type: Seamount chain

The South Kermadec Ridge Seamounts are a continuation of the volcanic island arc, formed at the convergent boundary where the Pacific Plate subducts under the Indo-Australian Plate. The subducting Pacific Plate created the Kermadec Trench, the second deepest submarine trench, to the east of the islands. The seamounts lie along the western aspect of the undersea Kermadec Ridge, which runs southwest from the Kermadec Islands towards the North Island of New Zealand and northeast towards Tonga (Kermadec-Tonga Arc).

This area of the Kermadec Arc - Havre Trough is a relatively young oceanic arc-back-arc system as it became active in the Quaternary. The seamounts include:

Map of South Kermadec Ridge Seamounts. It is possible by clicking on map to enable mouseover of names.

- Speight Knoll −1,840 metres (−6,037 ft)32.3883°S 179.591°E
- Oliver Knoll −2,200 metres (−7,218 ft)32.39448°S 179.67231°E
- Haungaroa Seamount −660 metres (−2,165 ft)32.6152°S 179.6217°E
- Kuiwai Seamount −560 metres (−1,837 ft)33.159°S 179.9565°E
- Cole Seamount 33.4095°S 179.8715°E
- Ngātoroirangi Seamount −340 metres (−1,115 ft)33.73533°S 179.79666°E
- Sonne Seamount 34.066667°S 179.583333°E
- Kibblewhite Seamount −990 metres (−3,248 ft)34.5762°S 179.262°E
- Gill Seamount −1,200 metres (−3,937 ft) 34.62°S 178.375°E
  - Situated in the middle of a deep basin (3000m deep) in the Havre Trough, to the west of Kibblewhite and actually closer to the Lau-Colville Ridge than the Kermadec Ridge
  - Basalt age 1.1 ± 0.4 Ma
- Yokosuka Seamount −1,060 metres (−3,478 ft) 34.7°S 178.57°E
  - To west of Brothers situated on an elevated basal plateau (2500m deep)
- Rapuhia Seamount −650 metres (−2,133 ft) 34.77°S 178.5°E
  - To west of Brothers
- Gilianes Seamount −700 metres (−2,297 ft) 34.77°S 178.58°E
  - To west of Brothers
- Brothers Seamount −1,350 metres (−4,429 ft) 34.875°S 179.075°E
- Healy −1,150 metres (−3,773 ft) 35.0°S 178.9°E
  - Two calderas in a 15 kilometres (9 mi) elongated complex with the largest caldera being 3 x 4 km
    - This is believed to have been formed in the 1360 ± 75 CE eruption
  - Cotton −980 metres (−3,215 ft) 35.004°S 178.973°E
    - Satellitic cone to Healy at south west end of complex
- The Silents
  - Silent I Seamount
  - Silent II Seamount −850 metres (−2,789 ft) 35.15991°S 178.86805°E
- The Rumbles
  - Rumble I Seamount −1,100 metres (−3,609 ft) 35.5°S 178.9°E
  - Rumble II West Seamount −1,200 metres (−3,937 ft) 35.353°S 178.527°E
  - Rumble II East Seamount −850 metres (−2,789 ft) 35.42916°S 178.65475°E
  - Rumble III Seamount −140 metres (−459 ft) 35.745°S 178.478°E
    - Largest of the chain of Rumble seamounts
    - Eruptions on:
      - 9 July 1958
      - 16 January 1963
      - 15 October 1973
      - 15 June 1986
      - 2 July 2008
  - Rumble IV Seamount −450 metres (−1,476 ft)36.13°S 178.05°E
  - Rumble V Seamount −1,100 metres (−3,609 ft)36.139°S 178.197°E
- Lillie Seamount −1,280 metres (−4,199 ft)35.86956°S 178.43546°E
  - Lillie is north of Rumbles IV and V
- Tangaroa Seamount −600 metres (−1,969 ft) 36.321°S 178.028°E
- Clark Seamount −860 metres (−2,822 ft) 36.446°S 177.839°E
- Whakatāne Seamount −900 metres (−2,953 ft) 36.78282°S 177.46181°E
