= Whakaari / White Island =

Island volcano in New Zealand's Bay of Plenty

- Whakaari (Māori)
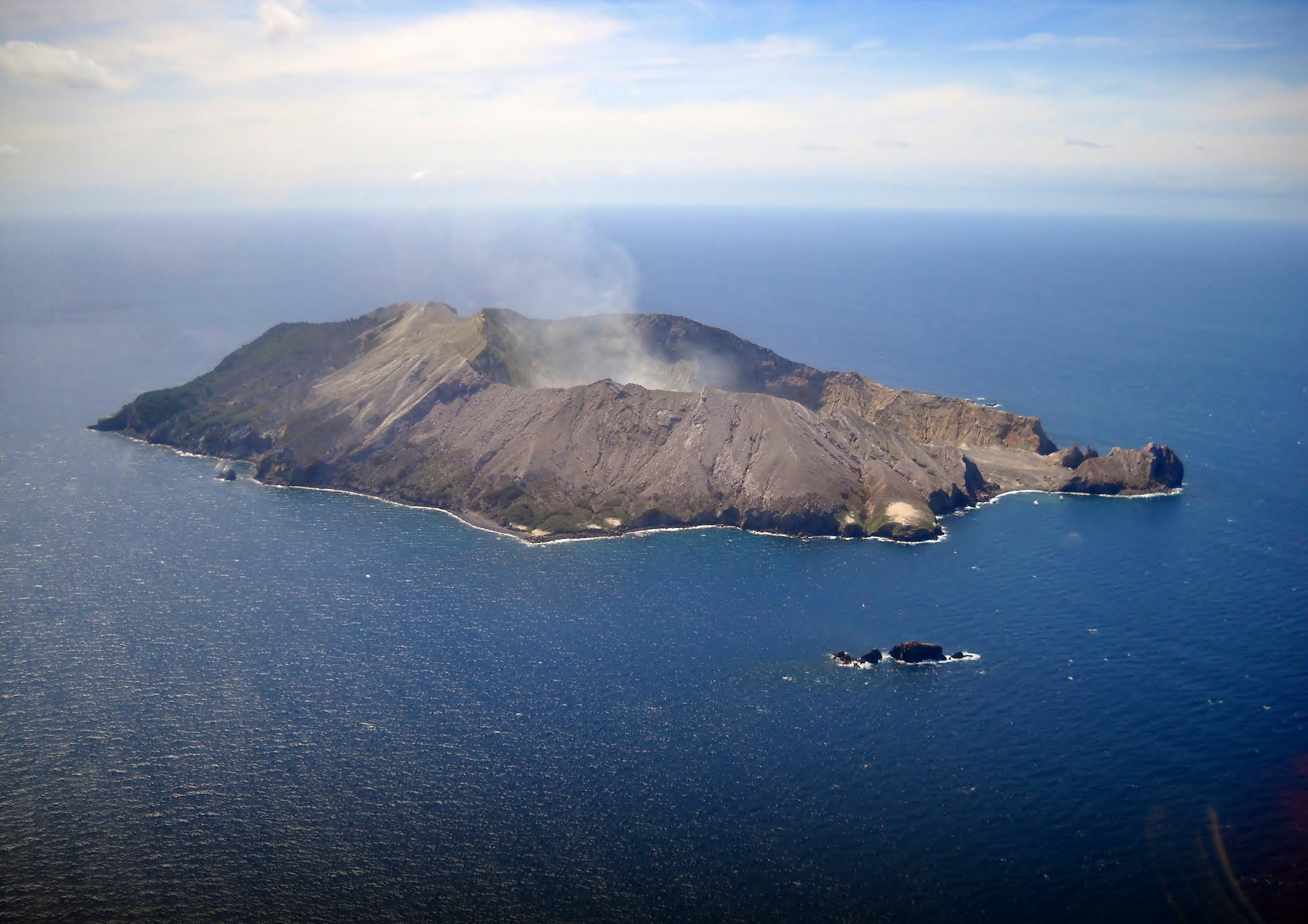
- Whakaari / White Island seen from the south

Highest point
- Elevation: 321 m (1,053 ft)
- Prominence: 321 m (1,053 ft)
- Coordinates: 37°31′12″S 177°10′57″E

Geography
- Location of Whakaari / White Island
- Location: Bay of Plenty, (off) North Island, New Zealand

Geology
- Mountain type: Stratovolcano
- Rock type(s): Andesite, Basaltic andesite, Dacite
- Volcanic zone: Taupō Volcanic Zone
- Last eruption: 19 April 2025

Whakaari / White Island ([faˈkaːɾi], Māori: Te Puia Whakaari, lit. "the dramatic volcano"), also known as White Island or Whakaari, is an active andesite stratovolcano situated 48 km (30 mi) from the east coast of the North Island of New Zealand, in the Bay of Plenty. The island covers an area of approximately 325 ha (800 acres), which is just the peak of a much larger submarine volcano.

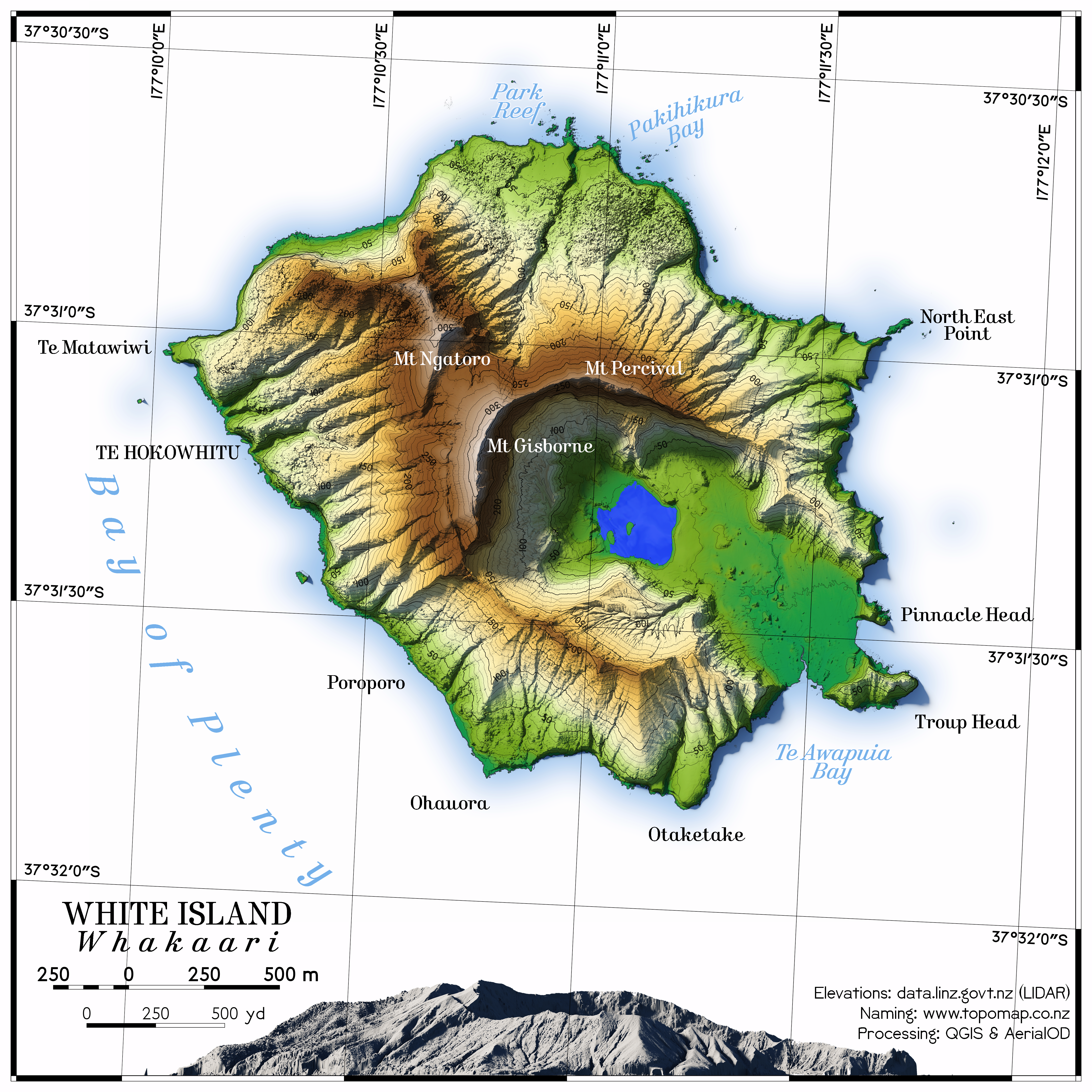
Topographical map of Whakaari / White Island

The island is New Zealand's most active cone volcano, and has been built up by continuous volcanic activity over the past 150,000 years. The nearest mainland towns are Whakatāne and Tauranga. The island has been in a nearly continuous stage of releasing volcanic gas at least since it was sighted by James Cook in 1769. Whakaari erupted continually from December 1975 until September 2000, and also erupted in 2012, 2016, and 2019.

Sulphur was mined on the island until the 1930s. Ten miners were killed in 1914 when part of the crater wall collapsed.

A large eruption occurred at 14:11 on 9 December 2019, which resulted in 22 fatalities, including two people who were missing and ruled to be dead by a coroner. Twenty-five survivors were injured, many critically and with severe burns. Forty-seven people were reportedly on the island when it erupted. A second eruption closely followed the first.

== Geography ==
Whakaari / White Island is an irregular oval in shape, with a length (northwest–southeast) of 3 kilometres (1.9 mi) and a width of 2 kilometres (1.2 mi), and covers an area of approximately 325 hectares (800 acres). It lies in the Bay of Plenty 48 kilometres (30 mi) from the North Island mainland, due north of the town of Ōpōtiki and north-northeast of Whakatāne. The island's active crater lies slightly southeast of the island's centre, and contains an acidic lake. The crater has a sharp rim to the northwest, with its highest point (also the island's highest point) being the 321-metre (1,053 ft) Mount Gisborne in the west. The 283-metre (928 ft) Mount Percival forms the northern part of the rim. An older vent, the 310-metre (1,020 ft) Mount Ngatoro, lies to the northwest. The exposed island is only the peak of a much larger submarine volcano, which rises up to 1,600 m (5,249 ft) above the nearby seafloor.

The island is generally rugged, with cliffs surrounding most of the coast. The only exceptions are to the southeast of the crater, where ash and boulder slopes descend to Te Awapuia Bay (also known as Crater Bay), the site of derelict buildings and the island's wharf. This bay lies between a prominent headland, Troup Head, at the island's southeastern extreme, and the island's southernmost point, Otaketake, which is the site of one of the island's gannet colonies. Another colony exists at Te Hokowhitu, the cliff which forms much of the western coast of the island.

Several rock reefs and islets are located along the island's northeast coast, and there is also a rock reef at Troup Head. A small islet, Club Rocks, lies 800-metre (2,600 ft) south of Otaketake Point. It consists of a set of four sea stacks rising to more than 20-metre (66 ft) above sea level. In addition, four sea stacks collectively known as Te Paepae o Aotea or Volkner Rocks lie 5 kilometres (3.1 mi) northwest of Whakaari / White Island. Three of these sea stacks rise precipitously from the sea floor (less than 100 metres (330 ft) below sea level) to a maximum height of 113 metres (371 ft) m above sea level. The fourth sea stack is just an eroded stump.

=== Climate ===
Climate data for White Island, elevation 314 m (1,030 ft), (2007–2019)
Month	Jan	Feb	Mar	Apr	May	Jun	Jul	Aug	Sep	Oct	Nov	Dec	Year
Mean daily maximum °C (°F)	21.5 (70.7)	22.0 (71.6)	20.7 (69.3)	18.5 (65.3)	15.8 (60.4)	13.3 (55.9)	12.6 (54.7)	13.1 (55.6)	14.1 (57.4)	15.3 (59.5)	17.8 (64.0)	19.6 (67.3)	17.0 (62.6)
Daily mean °C (°F)	18.5 (65.3)	19.1 (66.4)	17.9 (64.2)	16.0 (60.8)	13.6 (56.5)	11.3 (52.3)	10.6 (51.1)	11.0 (51.8)	11.7 (53.1)	12.5 (54.5)	14.7 (58.5)	16.8 (62.2)	14.5 (58.1)
Mean daily minimum °C (°F)	15.5 (59.9)	16.1 (61.0)	15.1 (59.2)	13.5 (56.3)	11.4 (52.5)	9.4 (48.9)	8.7 (47.7)	8.9 (48.0)	9.3 (48.7)	9.7 (49.5)	11.8 (53.2)	14.0 (57.2)	12.0 (53.5)
Source: NIWA

== Geology ==
Whakaari / White Island is an andesite–dacite stratovolcano that consists of two overlapping volcanic cones, which are the Ngatoro and Central cones. The Ngatoro Cone is extinct and partially eroded. The amphitheatre-shaped Central Cone is an active cone. The crater of Central Cone is open to the southeast as the result of major, past flank landslides involving hydrothermally altered rock and past phreatic and phreatomagmatic eruptions. the Ngatoro Cone and Central cones are both constructed of alternating layers of lava flows, tuffs, agglomerates, tephra, igneous dikes, and breccias. Some of these strata have been altered to varying degrees by highly corrosive and acid hydrothermal fluids and gases.

The modern crater floor of Whakaari / White Island lies less than 30-metre (98 ft) above sea level and is largely covered by material from the 1914 debris avalanche. The main crater contains three coalescing sub-craters. The sub-craters are aligned NW-SE within the amphitheatre-shaped Central Cone. The open sea breaches the south-eastern crater wall in three places to form Shark, Te Awapuia, and Wilson bays, which Troup Head and Pinnacle Head separate from each other. Long-lived, semi-continuous, weak, hydrothermal explosions, similar to those occurring in the Western sub-crater today, are regarded to have formed these three bays as hydrothermal explosion craters.

Whakaari / White Island and the sea stacks that form Club Rocks and Volckner Rocks are the emergent summits of a larger, 16 by 18 kilometres (9.9 by 11.2 mi), submarine volcano. It is known as White Island Volcano and has a total volume of 78 km^{3} (19 cu mi). The bathymetry surrounding the emergent summit of Whakaari / White Island consists of a broad, sloping shelf extending from sea level to approximately 80-metre (260 ft) depth. Steep margins define the extent of the submarine volcano at a depths of 300–400-metre (980–1,310 ft)

The amphitheatre-shaped crater of the modern Central Cone is argued to have been created by the collapse of the former cone of the White Island Volcano to the southwest. Based on extrapolating 20 m GIS contour data to enclose the present crater and upwards with a maximum slope angle of 30°, the former pre-collapse summit was inferred to have been 500–600-metre (1,600–2,000 ft) high. Side-scan and bathymetric data indicate possible debris flows associated with its collapse that can be traced back to the current crater on White Island. One of these debris flows exited the crater on the southern side of Troup Head and towards the southeast. It produced well-defined boulder-covered lobes on the seafloor. Another debris flow exited the modern crater on the northern side of Troup Head and through several submarine valleys towards the east into deep water. It produced boulder-covered valley-fill deposits. The latter debris flow was large enough to have produced a significant tsunami. As a result of the collapse of the former cone of the White Island Volcano, it is suspected to have generated a 7-metre (23 ft) high tsunami that flooded the coast of Bay of Plenty as much as 7 kilometres (4.3 mi) inland between 3,000 and 2,200 B.P.

== Volcanology ==
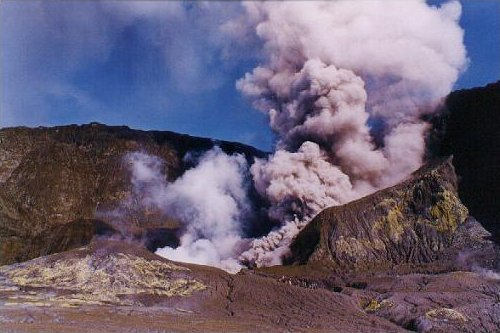
Main vent of Whakaari / White Island in 2000

Whakaari / White Island lies in the northern end of the Taupō Volcanic Zone. The Taupō Volcanic Zone forms the southernmost segment of the 2,800 km (1,700 mi)-long Tonga–Kermadec–Taupō volcanic arc system and the Lau Basin–Havre Trough–Ngatoro Basin back-arc basin system.

=== Geological history ===
For the past few thousand years, Whakaari / White Island has been the location for an open, highly reactive hydrothermal system. This hydrothermal system expresses itself as hot springs and mud pools, fumaroles, and acid streams and lakes. The present centre for volcanic activity and outgassing is a large crater lake of boiling acidic waters located in the western subcrater. The intermixing mélange of marine waters, meteoric waters, and hot magmatic fluids generate acid brines, with pH as low as 2, that outgas and form numerous and often transitory hot springs and mud pools, fumaroles, and acid streams and lakes. The crater lake of boiling acidic water, which occupies the western subcrater, appears to vary in volume due to changing meteorological conditions and fluctuating levels of hydrothermal activity.

Although Strombolian activity occurred from the late seventies to the mid-eighties, explosive eruptions at Whakaari / White Island are typically phreatic or phreatomagmatic in style. The lava flows, ash, and pyroclastic flows produced by historic and prehistoric eruptions are andesitic and dacitic in composition. These eruptions also produce discrete craters within crater-fill deposits of the Central Cone. Since 1826, there has been a minimum of 28 phreatic or phreatomagmatic eruptions. In addition, prehistoric eruptions have also extruded lava. The lava flows from these prehistoric eruptions are exposed crater walls of the Central Cone. Whakaari / White Island's frequent activity and easy access attract scientists and volcanologists as well as many tourists. For example, this volcano provides a readily studied example of the type of volcanic magmatic–hydrothermal system involved in the generation of porphyry copper deposits.

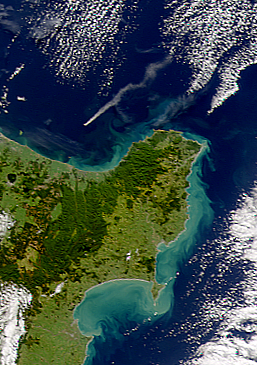
Eruption plume stretching northeastwards from Whakaari / White Island as seen from space, June 2000

Volcanologists from the GeoNet Project continually monitor the volcano's activity via surveillance cameras. Survey pegs, magnetometers and seismography equipment for early earthquake warnings via radio were installed on the crater walls in 1976. At most times the volcanic activity is limited to steaming fumaroles and boiling mud, but gas and ash emissions are common, and the island is typically on an alert level rating of 1 or 2 on a scale of 0 to 5; as "Level 2 is the highest alert level before an eruption takes place and indicates 'moderate to heightened volcanic unrest' with the 'potential for eruption hazards.'" The volcano is also monitored by the Deep Earth Carbon Degassing Project.

In March 2000, three small vents appeared in the main crater and began belching ash which covered the island in fine grey powder. An eruption on 27 July 2000 blanketed the island with mud and scoria and a new crater appeared. Major eruptions in 1981–83 altered much of the island's landscape and destroyed the extensive pōhutukawa forest. The large crater created at that time now contains a lake, whose level varies substantially.

Between July and August 2012 the island showed signs of increased activity with lake and gas levels rising from inside the crater. On 5 August 2012 a minor eruption occurred, sending ash into the air. More eruptions have followed since.

Ongoing volcanic activity and tremors on 25 January 2013 suggested another eruption was imminent. A small eruption occurred on 20 August 2013 at 10:23 am, lasting for ten minutes and producing mostly steam.

A minor eruption is ongoing as of 11 August 2024. The eruption has produced a weak plume with a low concentration of volcanic ash. As of January 2025, the volcano still emits weak to moderate gas and steam plumes on some days.

==== 2019 eruption ====
In November 2019, background activity at Whakaari increased and gas, steam and mud was being ejected from the crater.

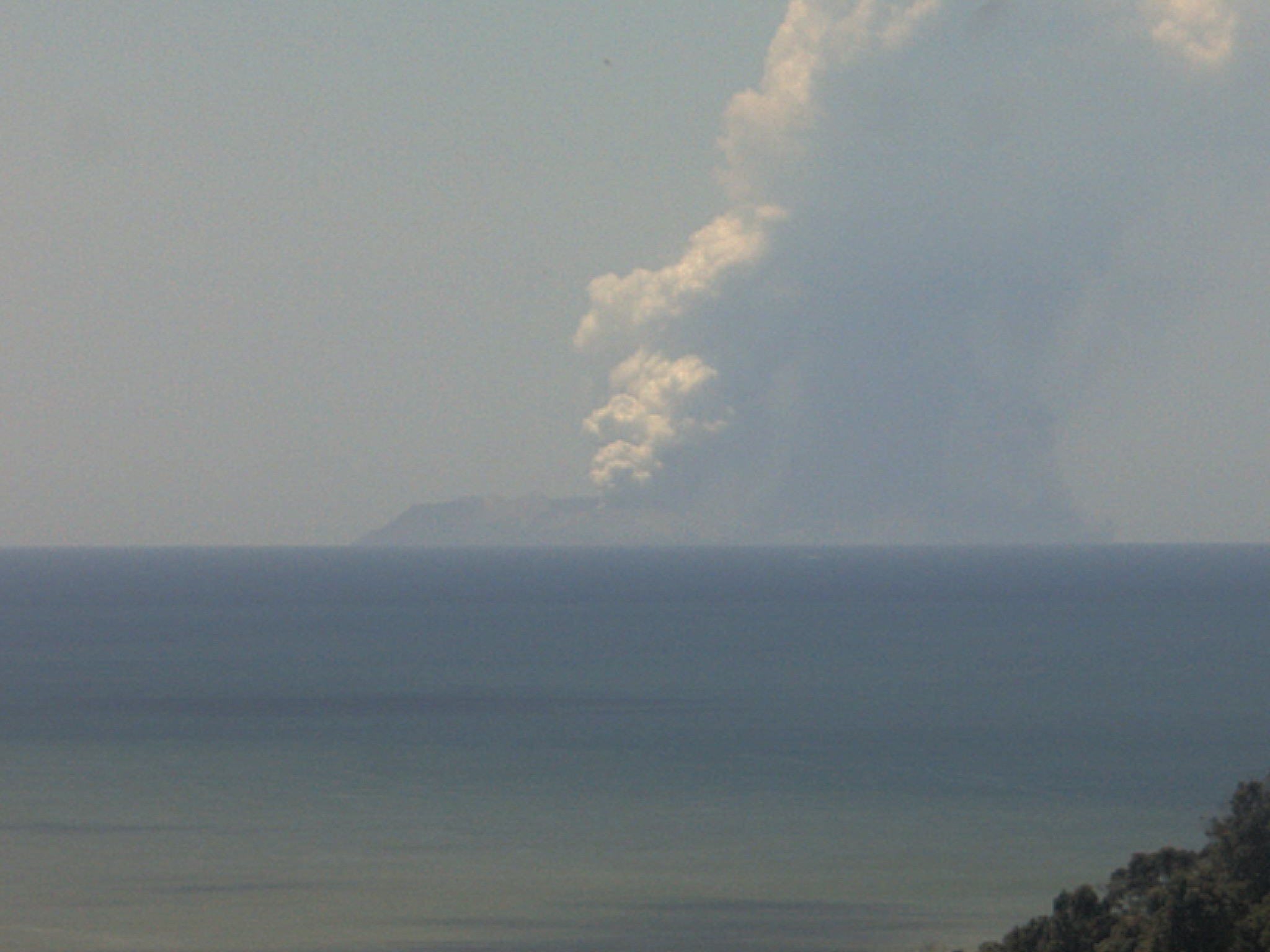
View of the 2019 Whakaari / White Island eruption from Whakatane at 14:20, 9 minutes after the start of the eruption

At 14:11 NZDT on 9 December 2019, Whakaari / White Island erupted. It was reported that there were forty-seven people on the island when the eruption happened. Twenty-two people were killed, including two people who were missing and confirmed dead on 23 January 2020, and a further twenty-five were seriously injured, many critically. The bodies of two victims have not been recovered and may have been lost to the sea. The ongoing seismic and volcanic activity in the area and subsequently heavy rainfall as well as low visibility and toxic gases all hampered recovery efforts.

Experts identified the event as a phreatic eruption: a release of steam and volcanic gases which caused an explosion, launching rock and ash into the air. Minor ash emissions were observed on 23 and 26 December, but no further eruptions occurred. Visual observations conducted in January showed that lava had been extruded into the vents created by the eruption on 9 December.

== History ==
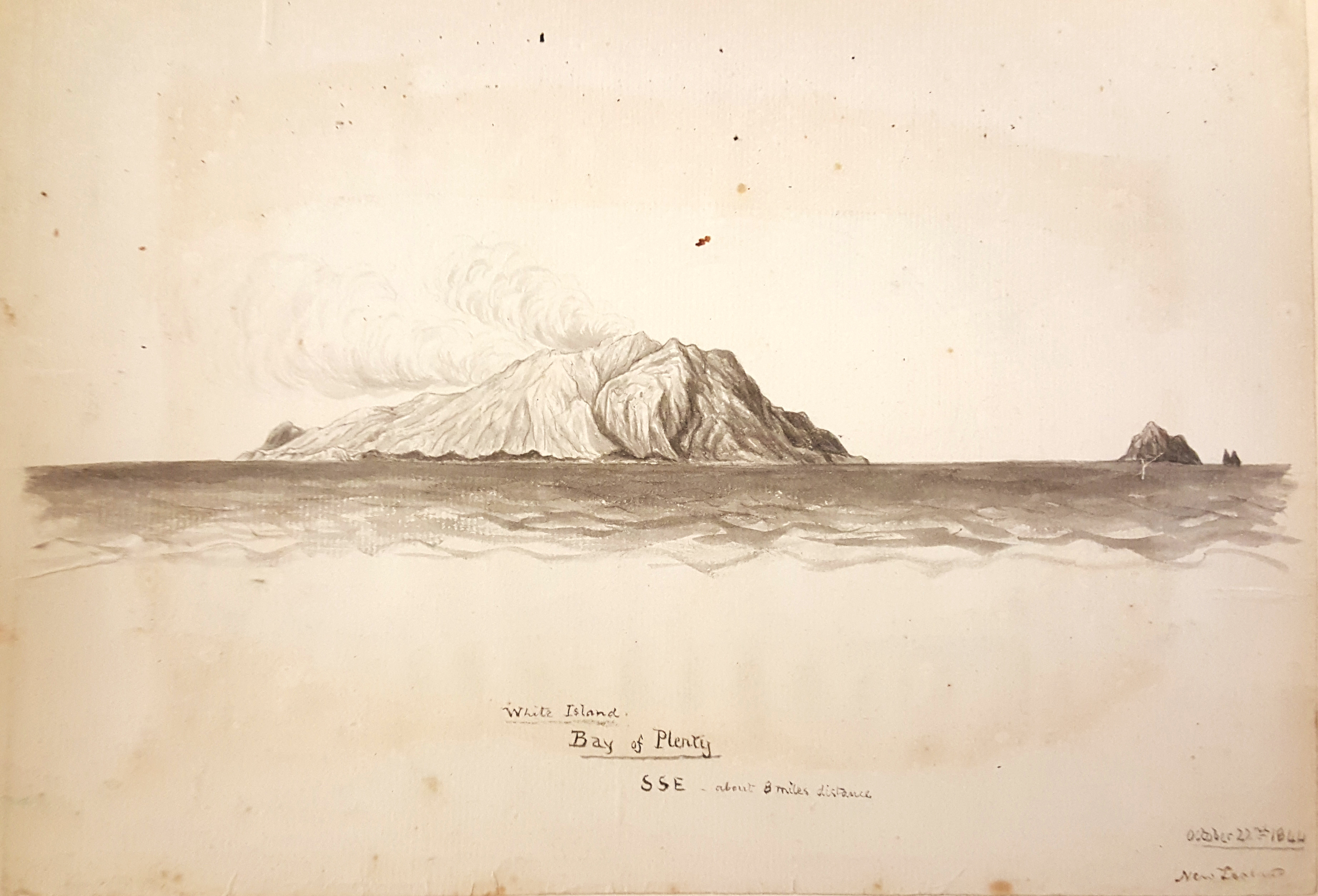
Whakaari / White Island, 22 October 1844, from album of drawings compiled by T.E. Donne

=== Name ===
The Māori name Whakaari is recorded in multiple 19th century texts by Europeans, with one mention dating back to 1849, though spelling varied including Wakaari, Whakari, and Whaka ari. The name Whakaari means "to make visible" or "exposed to view". The full Māori name for the island is te puia whakaari, meaning "The Dramatic Volcano".

Whakaari was named "White Island" by Captain Cook on 1 November 1769. Cook noted in his journal, "I have named it White Island because as such it always appeared to us". According to LINZ this name came from the dense clouds of white steam emanating from it. Alternatively, he may have been alluding to the guano deposits that once covered the island. Although Cook sailed close to the island, he did not record that it was a volcano.

The island's official name was changed from "White Island (Whakaari)" to "Whakaari / White Island" in 1997. This makes it one of many places in New Zealand with dual Māori and English names.

=== Mythology ===
Some Māori myths describe Whakaari as part of Ngātoro-i-rangi's ascent of Tongariro. In one account, he called on his ancestors for warmth; the fire was kindled on Whakaari and brought to him. Other versions of this story are similar but it is his sisters, or the gods, who send him warmth from Whakaari.

Other stories give origin stories for the island. One states that it rose from the deep after the god Māui, having first touched fire was so greatly tortured by the pain that he instantly dived under water to calm his pain; and in the place where he shook the fire from him arose Whakaari. Another tells that Moutohora Island and Whakaari / White Island were peaks in the Huiarau Range near Waikaremoana but were jealous of each other, and rushed towards the ocean, leaving behind them the tracks that now form the Whakatane valley and either the Tauranga or Te Waimana valley. Whakaari was faster, so got to the better position where it stands today.

=== Industry ===
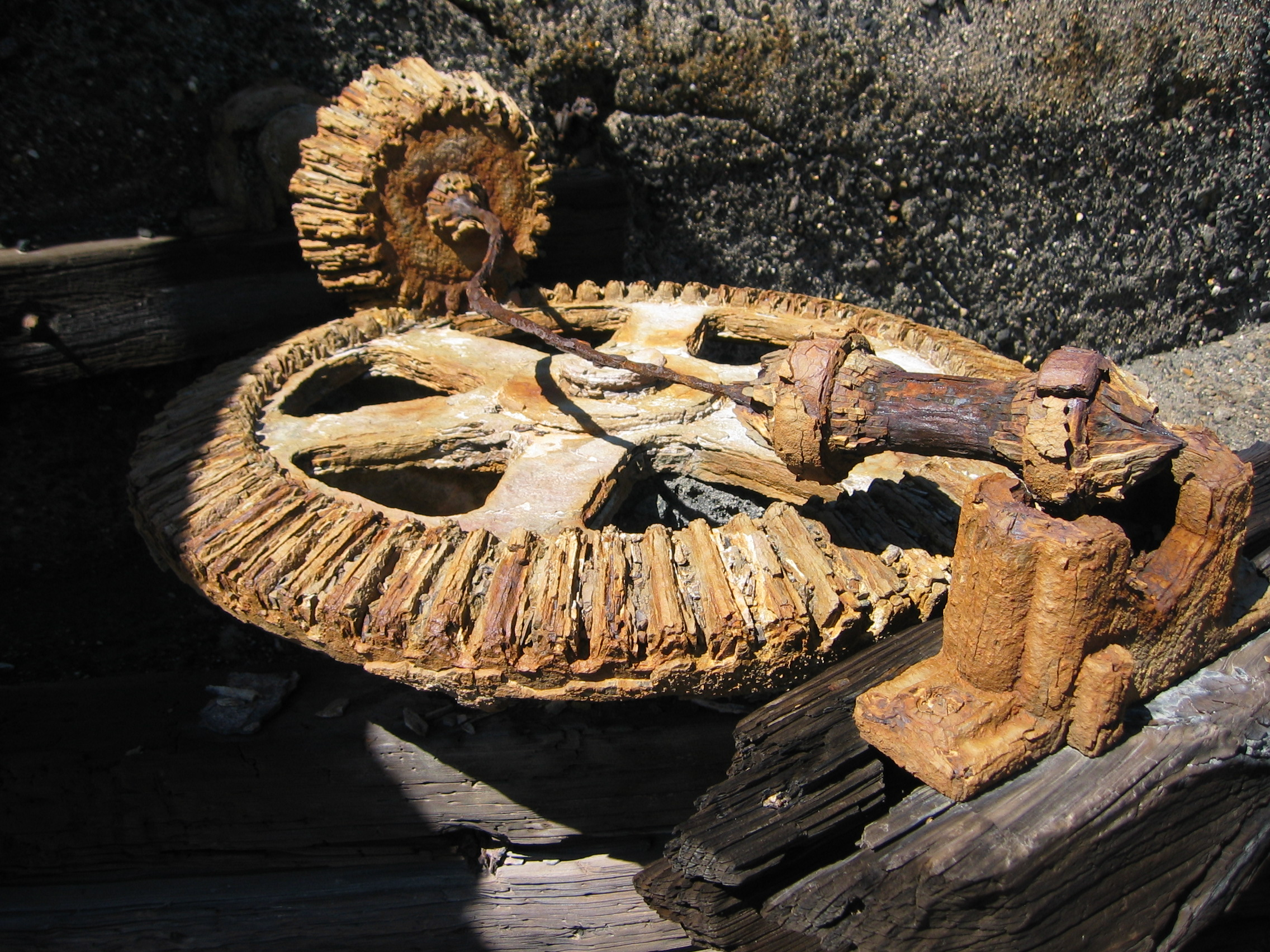
Corroding machinery at old sulphur mine

Attempts were made in the mid-1880s, again from 1898 to 1901, and then from 1913 to 1914, to mine sulphur from Whakaari / White Island, with the island at first being owned by John Wilson. Mining came to a halt in September 1914, when part of the western crater rim collapsed, creating a lahar that killed all 10 workers, who disappeared without a trace. Only a camp cat survived, found some days afterwards by the resupply ship and dubbed "Peter the Great".

In late 1923,the White Island (New Zealand)Sulphur Company was registered in London with a capital of £100,000. Mining was again attempted but, learning from the 1914 disaster, the miners built their huts on a flat part of the island near a gannet colony. Each day they would lower their boat into the sea from a gantry, and row around to the mining factory wharf in Crater Bay. If the sea was rough they had to clamber around the rocks on a very narrow track on the crater's edge.

Before the days of antibiotics, sulphur was used as an antibacterial agent in medicines, in the making of match-heads, and for sterilising wine corks. The sulphur was hauled to the crushing plant in small rail trucks, and a bagging facility was also constructed. However, there was not enough sulphur in the material mined at the island, so the ground-up rock was used as a component of agricultural fertiliser. Mining ended in the 1930s, because of the inadequate mineral content in the fertiliser. The remains of the buildings involved can still be seen, heavily corroded by the sulphuric gases.

=== Ownership ===
The ownership of Whakaari / White Island was one of the first two cases heard by the Native Land Court of New Zealand (now called the Māori Land Court), the other being ownership of nearby Motuhora. Retireti Tapihana (Tapsell) brought the case in 1867, claiming ownership. Retireti was the son of Phillip Tapsell and Hine-i-tūrama Ngātiki. Ownership was awarded jointly to Retireti Tapihana and his sister Katherine Simpkins.

In 1874, the island was sold to the partnership John Wilson and William Kelly by the estate of Retireti Tapihana (Tapsell). Wilson and Kelly subsequently leased it to the Auckland-based partnership of Stewart and Appleby, but after the conditions of the lease were unfulfilled, it was put up for lease again.

The island is now privately owned by the Buttle family trust, having been bought by George Raymond Buttle, a stockbroker, in 1936. Buttle later refused to sell it to the government, but agreed in 1952 that it be declared a private scenic reserve. In 2012, the island's title was transferred to the Whakaari Trust, whose shareholders are Peter, Andrew and James Buttle.

== Local government ==
The island is not included in the boundaries of a territorial authority council (district council) and the Minister of Local Government is its territorial authority, with support from the Department of Internal Affairs. The functions of the territorial authority are limited, as the island is uninhabited, the land is undeveloped and it is privately owned. The island is within the boundaries of the Bay of Plenty Regional Council for regional council functions.

== Natural life ==
Whakaari / White Island is one of New Zealand's main breeding colonies for Australasian gannets. Thousands of gannets come to the island each year to mate, raise chicks, and feed on the fish in the water around it. There is little vegetation on the island itself, but seaweed grows in the waters around it and gannet parents harvest it to cool off chicks. An ornithologist who visited in 1912 found five species and identified four; in addition to gannets they found red-billed gulls, great-winged petrels, and white-fronted terns.

BirdLife International has declared the island to be an Important Bird Area because of the gannets' nesting colony.

== Access ==
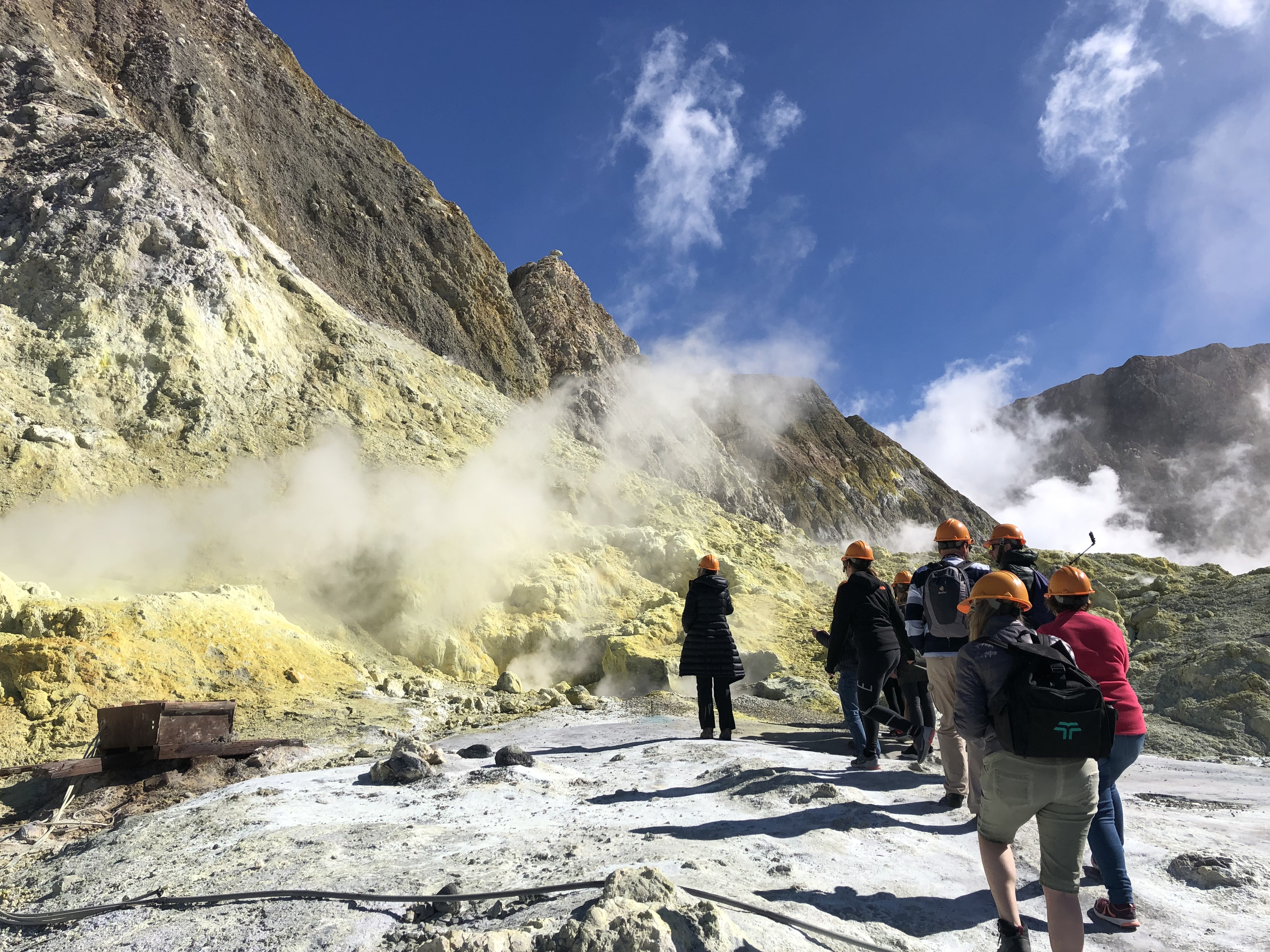
Tourists on the island in April 2019

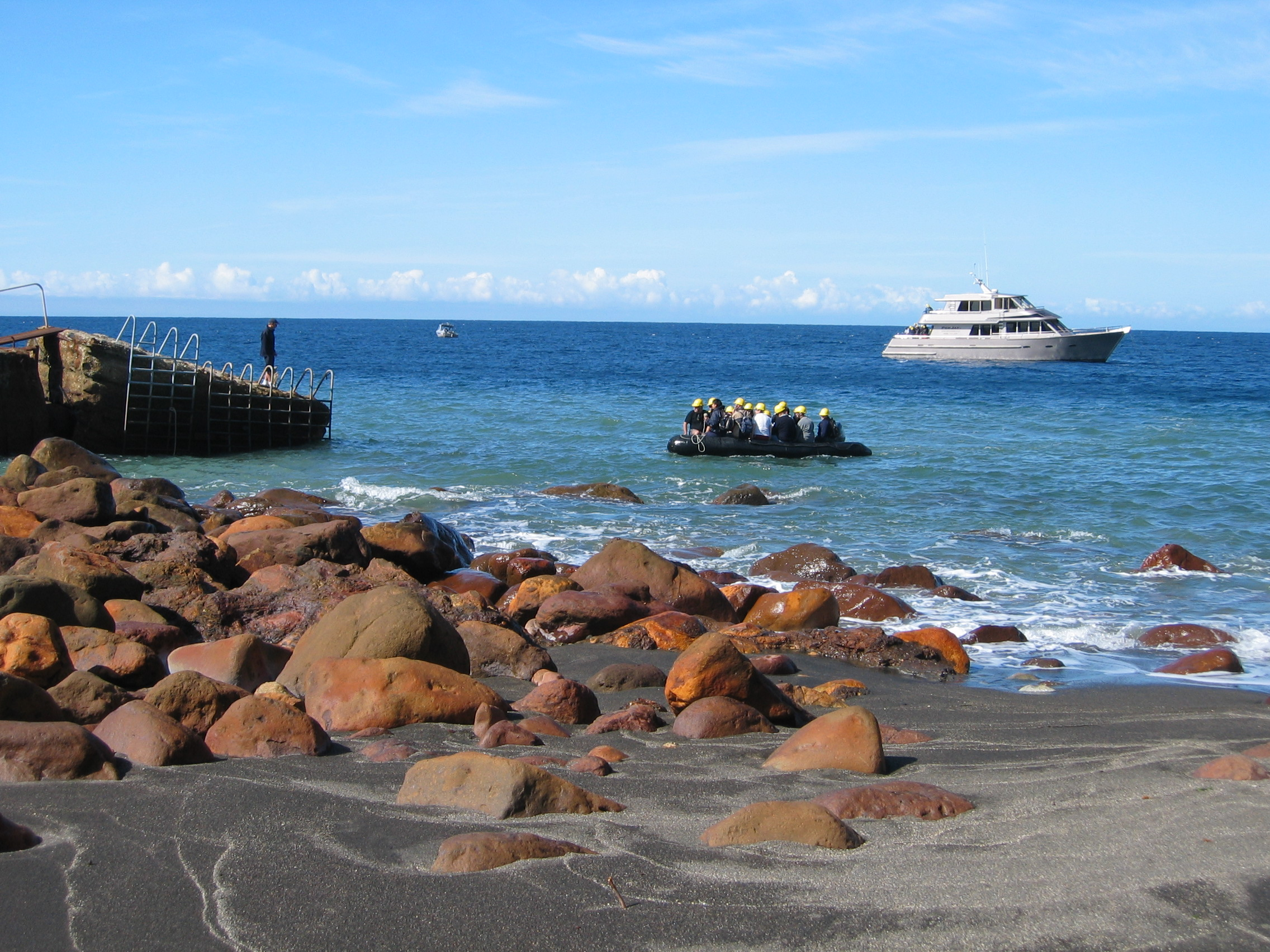
Visitors approaching the wharf

Whakaari / White Island is privately owned. It was declared a private scenic reserve in 1953, and is subject to the provisions of the Reserves Act 1977. Visitors cannot land without permission. However, it is easily accessible by authorised tourist operators.

The waters surrounding the island are well known for their fish stocks. Yellowtail kingfish abound all year, while there is deep-water fishing for hapuka and bluenose (a type of warehou) in the winter. In the summer, blue, black and striped marlin, as well as yellowfin tuna can be caught. A small charter fleet, offering day trips and overnight or longer trips, operates from the nearby port at Whakatāne.

On-land tours of the island have not been operating since the 2019 eruption.

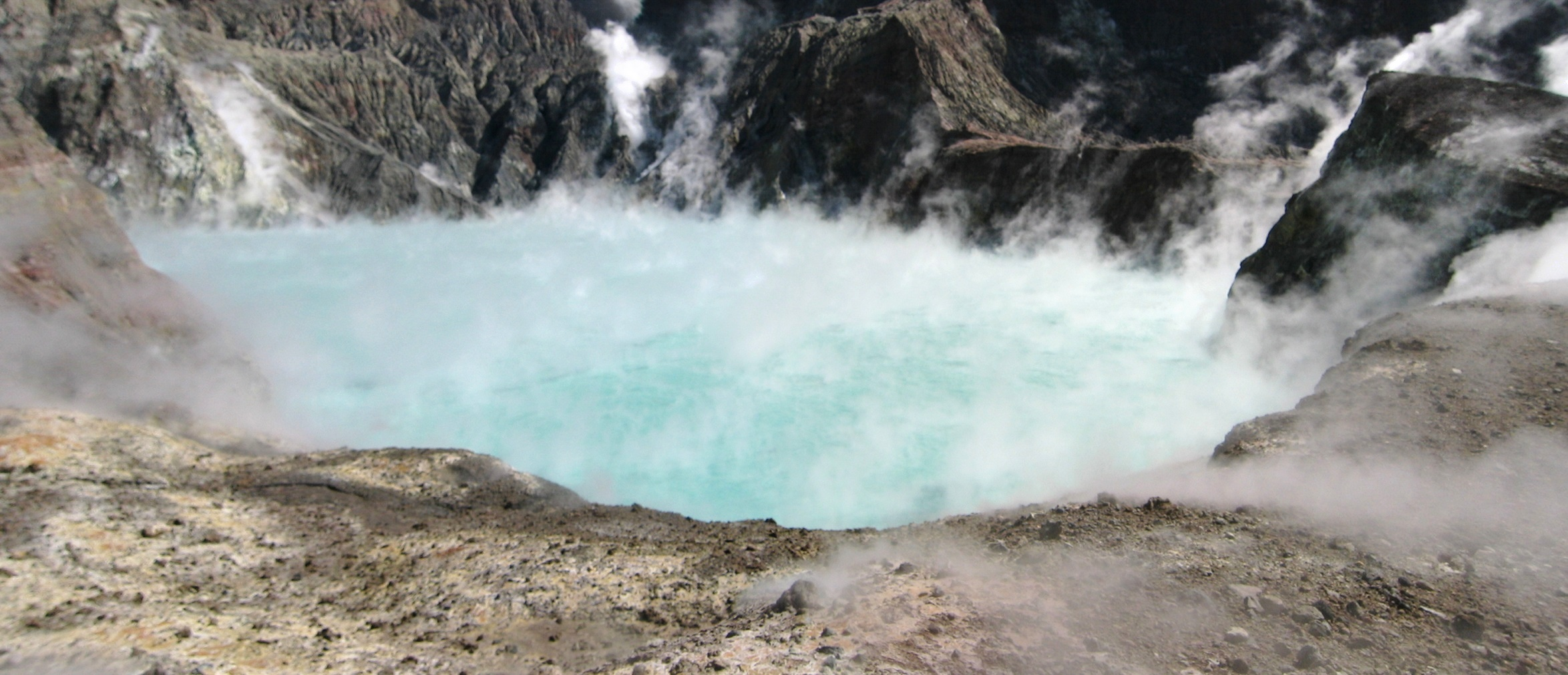
The crater lake in 2004

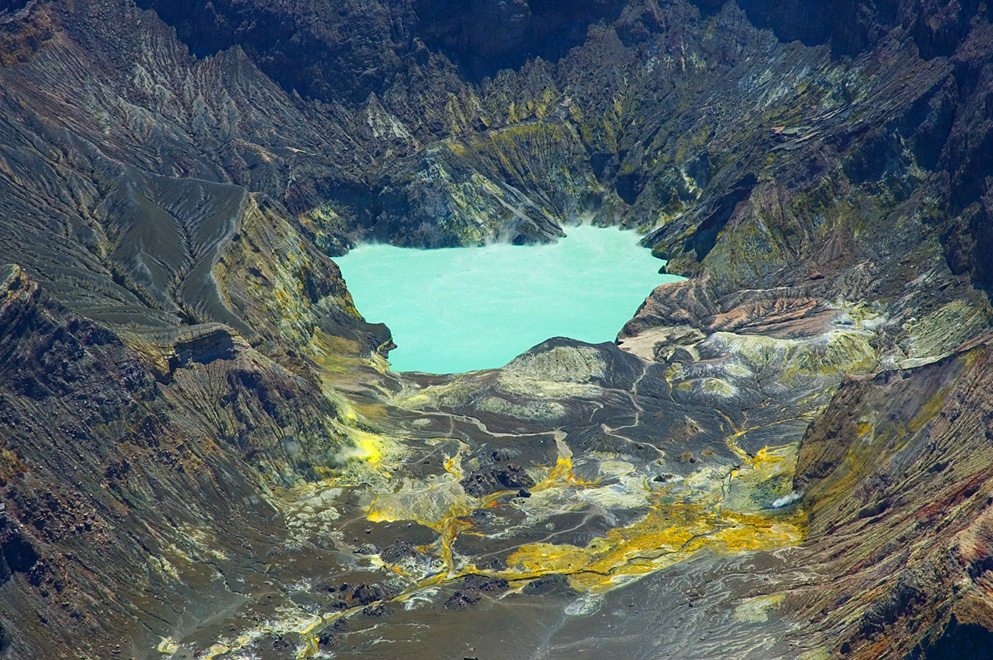
Aerial view of the crater lake in 2005

Short video of sulphurous fumarole on White Island

== See also ==
- List of islands of New Zealand
- List of volcanoes in New Zealand
- Volcanology of New Zealand
