= Horizon Guyot =

Tablemount in the Pacific Ocean

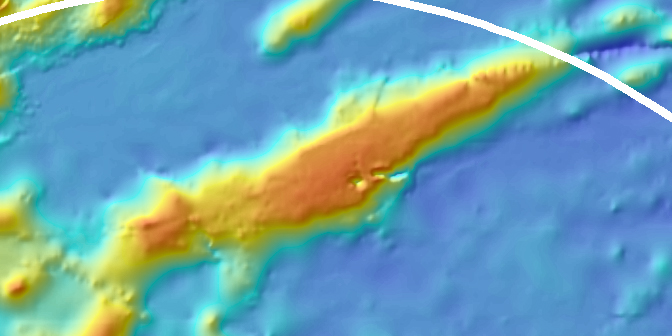

- Location within North Pacific
- Summit depth: 1,443 metres (4,734 ft)

Location
- Coordinates: 19°07.9′N 169°27.6′W

Geology
- Type: Guyot

Horizon Guyot is a presumably Cretaceous tablemount (guyot) in the Mid-Pacific Mountains of the Pacific Ocean. It is an elongated ridge, over 300 kilometres (190 mi) long and 4.3 kilometres (2.7 mi) high, that stretches in a northeast–southwest direction and has two flat tops; it rises to a minimum depth of 1,443 metres (4,730 ft). The Mid-Pacific Mountains lie west of Hawaii and northeast of the Line Islands.

It was probably formed by a hotspot, but the evidence is conflicting. Volcanic activity occurred during the Turonian-Cenomanian eras 100.5–89.8 million years ago and another stage has been dated to have occurred 88–82 million years ago. Between these volcanic episodes, carbonate deposition from lagoonal and reefal environments set in and formed limestone. Volcanic islands developed on Horizon Guyot as well and were colonised by plants.

Horizon Guyot became a seamount during the Coniacian-Campanian period. Since then, pelagic ooze has accumulated on the seamount, forming a thick layer that is further modified by ocean currents and by various organisms that live on the seamount; sediments also underwent landsliding. Ferromanganese crusts were deposited on exposed rocks.

== Name and research history ==
The seamount is named after the research vessel RV Horizon and is also known as Horizon Ridge, Horizon Tablemount, Gora Khorayzn and Гора Хорайзн. During the Deep Sea Drilling Project, the drill cores called Site 44 and Site 171 were taken on Horizon Guyot in 1969 and 1971, respectively; a further drill core was obtained north of the seamount at Site 313 in 1973. This seamount is the best studied seamount of the Mid-Pacific Mountains and more is known about its morphology than any other seamount of the Mid-Pacific Mountains.

== Geography and geology ==
=== Local setting ===
Horizon Guyot lies west of Hawaii and is part of the Mid-Pacific Mountains. Unlike conventional island chains in the Pacific Ocean, the Mid-Pacific Mountains feature an oceanic plateau with guyots (also known as tablemounts) which become progressively younger towards the east. Other guyots in the Mid-Pacific Mountains are Sio South, Darwin, Thomas, Heezen, Allen, Caprina, Jacqueline, Allison and Resolution. South of Horizon Guyot, deep water in the "Horizon passage" leads into the Line Islands and Horizon Guyot is sometimes considered to be a member of that chain.

The seamount rises 3.4 kilometres (2.1 mi)-3.5 kilometres (2.2 mi) to a minimum depth of 1,443 metres (4,734 ft)–1,440 metres (4,720 ft), and is a ridge 75 kilometres (47 mi) wide and over 300 kilometres (190 mi) long; Horizon Guyot is the largest seamount in the Mid-Pacific Mountains. It trends in a southwest–northeast direction with an orientation matching that of other structures in the region such as fracture zones on the seafloor. Faulting has been observed on the western side of the seamount.

Two summit platforms lie on the ridge. The eastern one is the larger of these platforms and the western oval-shaped platform lies close to the western end of the ridge. These platforms are relatively flat and are surrounded by a slope break beyond which the guyot falls off steeply to the surrounding abyssal plain. This appearance characterises Horizon Guyot as a guyot although the elongated shape is unlike that of most guyots in the region which have one circular summit platform. At the margin of the platform, lie terraces which are up to 3 kilometres (1.9 mi) wide and up to 100 metres (330 ft) high and that discontinuously surround the summit platform; the flat surfaces of the terraces may be former fringing reefs. On the eastern summit platform there are buried terraces beneath the sediment cover.

Sediment layers cover almost the entire summit of Horizon Guyot, and consist mainly of sand, with clay and silt making up a minor part. Features on the sedimented seafloor are flat areas, hummocks, ripples and sediment waves. Seismic transects have revealed a relief of about 150 metres (490 ft) in the underlying basement and the presence of a central peak. Material obtained in drill cores includes chalk, chert, hyaloclastite, limestone, ooze and sandstone; basalt and chert outcrop in some places. In certain areas boulders and cobbles cover the seafloor; ferromanganese crusts cover exposed rocks.

The seamount shows evidence of repeated mass failures; including hummocky terrain, scarps and slump blocks, which are on average 30 metres (98 ft) thick. Landsliding is probably triggered by earthquakes; after the failure the landslides either stay coherent and do not travel far but some advance quickly and far. Talus blocks up to 5 metres (16 ft) in size cover the seafloor around Horizon Guyot.

=== Regional setting ===
The West Pacific Ocean seafloor contains many guyots of Mesozoic age (251.902 ± 0.024 (Note: The beginning of the Mesozoic coincides with the end of the Permian, the beginning of the Triassic and the Permian-Triassic extinction event, the largest mass extinction in over half a billion years; in order to determine its cause the chronology of the Permian-Triassic transition has been measured to a high precision.) – 66 million years ago) that developed in unusually shallow seas. These are submarine mountains which are characterised by a flat top and usually the presence of carbonate platforms that rose above the sea surface during the middle Cretaceous (c. 145–66 million years ago). During the Second World War, it was discovered that the seafloor of the Western Pacific Ocean was dotted with numerous flat-topped seamounts. These were promptly identified as sunken islands; at first, it was believed that they had sunk below the water in the Precambrian (over 541 ± 1 million years ago), before the presence of Cretaceous reefs on many of them was noticed. About 6% of the Pacific seafloor is covered with almost a million seamounts.

While there are some differences to present-day reef systems, (Note: Carbonate precipitates and grains or sediments are common in Cretaceous reefs, while in Cenozoic reefs reef-building organisms deposited carbonates within their bodies.) many of these seamounts were formerly atolls. All these structures originally formed as volcanoes in the Mesozoic ocean. Fringing reefs may have developed on the volcanoes, which then became barrier reefs as the volcano subsided and turned into an atoll; the barrier reefs in turn surround a lagoon or tidal flat. The crust underneath these seamounts tends to subside as it cools, and thus the islands and seamounts sink. Continued subsidence balanced by upward growth of the reefs led to the formation of thick carbonate platforms. Sometimes volcanic activity continued even after the formation of the atoll or atoll-like structure, and during episodes where the platforms rose above sea level erosional features such as channels and blue holes (Note: Pit-like depressions within carbonate rocks that are filled with water.) developed.

The formation of many such seamounts has been explained by the hotspot theory. According to this theory, an active volcano lies on a spot of the lithosphere heated from below; as the plate above this hotspot moves, the volcano is moved away from the heat source and volcanic activity ceases. The hotspot will then heat the area of the plate now above it, producing another active volcano. In this way, a chain of volcanoes that get progressively older away from the currently active one is generated. With some exceptions, radiometric dating of the Mid-Pacific Mountains has yielded evidence of an eastward movement of volcanism which is consistent with the hotspot theory; in the case of Horizon Guyot, volcanism may have migrated southwestward which is not entirely consistent with the hotspot theory. (Note: There is also an eastward movement of volcanism, which together with the southwestward movement implies a movement into two opposite directions rather than one chain as in the normal hotspot theory.) When it formed, Horizon Guyot may have been located close to a spreading centre.

=== Composition ===
Volcanic rocks dredged from Horizon Guyot are of basaltic composition and define a tholeiitic suite. Augite, labradorite, olivine, plagioclase and pyroxene form phenocrysts while pigeonite is found in the groundmass. Other guyots and samples from the Mid-Pacific Mountains have similar compositions to these found on Horizon Guyot. Some volcanic rocks occur in the form of hyaloclastite which contains palagonite and sideromelane. Dredged volcanic rocks are heavily altered; this has given rise to analcime, augite, calcite, clay, clinoptilolite, iddingsite, ilmenite, labradorite, magnetite iron oxides and talc.

Carbonates are found as limestone and siltstone; some limestones were formed by living beings. At one point in the drill core, carbonates were found mixed with volcanic rocks; presumably this is a place where hyaloclastite accumulated and was reworked by sea currents. The limestone contains fossils of algae, bryozoans, echinoids, foraminiferans, molluscs and ostracods; dinoflagellates, pollen and scolecodonts are also found. Some limestones have been modified by silicification and phosphatisation.

Clinoptilolite, pyrite, radiolarian fossils and yellow glass shards are found in the ooze, and some volcanic rocks and manganese rocks are cemented by indurated ooze. Ferromanganese and phosphorite crusts coat rocks. These ferromanganese crusts consist of iron oxides and manganese oxides and are related to manganese nodules and might become targets for future mining efforts. Other materials found on Horizon Guyot are analcime, barite, calcite, celadonite, cristobalite, glauconite, gypsum, ironstone, kaolinite, mica, montmorillonite, mudstone, quartz, sapropel, smectite and zeolite.

== Geologic history ==
Horizon Guyot is at least of Albian (c. 113–100.5 million years ago) age and is perhaps as much as 120 million years old. Radiometric dating has yielded ages of 88.1 ± 0.4 million years and more recently of 82.5 ± 0.4 million years; this may reflect either prolonged volcanism or that the older date is incorrect. About 100 and 80 million years ago a pulse of volcanism occurred in the Pacific Ocean; the formation of Horizon Guyot may have coincided with this pulse.

=== Volcanism ===
Basalt lava flows were emplaced on Horizon Guyot during the Cretaceous, before or during the Albian. A second volcanic phase occurred during the Turonian (93.9 – 89.8 ± 0.3 million years ago) and Cenomanian (100.5 – 93.9 million years ago); thus volcanic activity on Horizon Guyot was recurrent. The basalts include both typical ocean island basalts and basalts resembling mid-ocean ridge basalts, with the former found deeper in drill cores. Hyaloclastites which outcrop at the margin of the summit platform indicate the occurrence of submarine eruptions.

Eruptions probably occurred on aligned vents, explaining the elongated shape of Horizon Guyot. At first the formation of the terraces was also attributed to volcanic activity; an origin as wave cut terraces was considered to be unlikely but when it was found that Horizon Guyot had risen above sea level in the Cretaceous a wave cut origin was reproposed.

=== Carbonate island phase and renewed volcanism ===
During the Cretaceous, carbonates accumulated on Horizon Guyot while it subsided, forming a carbonate deposit which in one drill core is 134 metres (440 ft) thick. The carbonates accumulated directly on the previous volcano and reefs started growing when volcanic activity was still underway; Horizon Guyot featured lagoonal environments with algal reefs. Prior to 1973 there was no evidence that Horizon Guyot had ever formed an island but later a stage of emergence was postulated. The seamount was an island for at least 6 million years.

During the late Cretaceous, a second volcanic episode took place on Horizon Guyot and produced volcanites and volcanic sediments which buried older limestones. At that time, volcanic activity was underway not only on this seamount but also in the Line Islands; on Horizon Guyot this phase occurred perhaps as much as 30 million years after the previous volcanic stage.

Before this volcanic phase, Horizon Guyot had emerged from the sea and erosion had reworked some older rocks; also, plants grew on the now exposed island. Shallow water deposition in Coniacian (89.8 ± 0.3 – 86.3 ± 0.5 million years ago) or Santonian (86.3 ± 0.5 – 83.6 ± 0.2 million years ago) to Maastrichtian (72.1 ± 0.2 – 66 million years ago) time has been inferred from the presence of unstable (Note: Some fossils dissolve in deep water and thus are found only in shallow water sediments.) coccoliths of such age in drill cores.

=== Drowning and sedimentation ===
Horizon Guyot reached above sea level at least until the Cenomanian, unlike other Mid-Pacific Mountains guyots which sank below sea level during the Albian. Plant remnants are found in rocks of Turonian and Coniacian age, implying that Horizon Guyot was still emergent at that time; but by the Coniacian, Horizon Guyot was submerging. It is not known why Horizon Guyot drowned but the burial of the reefs by volcanic activity may have played a role.

Pelagic sedimentation commenced in the Campanian (83.6 ± 0.2 – 72.1 ± 0.2 million years ago) when Horizon Guyot had already sunk to a depth of 1,500 metres (4,900 ft). Since the Miocene (23.03 – 5.333 million years ago), sedimentation rates appear to have decreased as the guyot moved away from waters with high biological productivity and at some point in the last 10 million years erosion increased due to bottom currents linked to the glaciation of Antarctica.

Pelagic sediments accumulate on some guyots after they have drowned. A dome-shaped cap of pelagic ooze accumulated on top of Horizon Guyot during the Tertiary, reaching a maximum thickness of 110 metres (360 ft)-160 metres (520 ft) in some places. In the saddle between the summit platforms it is about 500 metres (1,600 ft) thick; an unconformity separates it from Cretaceous deposits. The sediment layers span a timespan encompassing the Eocene (56 – 33.9 million years ago) to the Quaternary (last 2.58 million years) with gaps in the sediment sequence between the Cretaceous and the Eocene and between the Eocene and the Oligocene (33.9 – 23.03 million years ago). During the Eocene and Oligocene, older foraminifera were redeposited; there is evidence that sediments were actively eroded. During Tertiary phases of low sea level, sea currents swept sediments off the surface of Horizon Guyot, with fine sediments being particularly affected.

=== Present state ===
The top and almost all the upper slopes of Horizon Guyot are covered by sediments. Chert and chalk are found within the sediments; chert forms seismically reflective layers within the sediment cap. These layers crop out at the margin of the sediment platform. The seamount lies in a region of the Pacific with nutrient poor surface waters.

Sea currents are unusually strong on the top of Horizon Guyot, probably due to the interaction of the slopes of Horizon Guyot with tidal currents. The seamount induces its own semidiurnal tide and the sea currents reach their maximum at the margin of the summit platform where 20 centimetres per second (7.9 in/s) have been measured. Scour marks have been observed. The currents sweep down the seamount slopes and may act to remove sediment from the seamount surface; this also results in sediments accumulating to form steep slopes that undergo landsliding. Most of the sediments however are transported upslope; those which do end up at the bottom of the seamount form talus deposits around Horizon Guyot.

== Ecology ==
Video of animal life on Horizon Guyot

The surfaces of Horizon Guyot are inhabited by many organisms. Fish found on Horizon Guyot include batfish, bathypteroids, chimeras, morids, sharks and synaphobranchid eels. Brittle stars, chaetognatha (arrow worms), copepods, corals, crustaceans, hydroids, loricifera, molluscs, nematodes, nemertinea, ophiuroids, ostracods, polychaetes, sipuncula, squat lobsters, vermes and xenophyophorans make up the bulk of the fauna on Horizon Guyot today. At least 29 macrofaunal species have been found. Other lifeforms presently active on the seamount are barnacles, crinoids, echiurids, enteropneusts (acorn worms), gorgonians, holothuroids (sea cucumbers), pennatulids (sea pens), sponges and starfish. Unidentified stalk or twig-like creatures have also been observed on the platform, which are among the most common lifeforms there. Bacteria are also found in the sediment.

Biological activity has left traces in the sediments such as mounds, pits, and trails on the surface. There is a certain zonation in the ecology of Horizon Guyot; for example suspension feeders live on the margin of the summit platform. Genetic differences between individuals of a given species which live on the top and these which live at the foot of the guyot have been noted. Some ostracods found on Horizon Guyot such as Cytherelloidea appear to have evolved from Cretaceous shallow water species as the seamount sank into colder waters.
