= Calliotropis abyssicola =

Scientific classification
- Kingdom: Animalia
- Phylum: Mollusca
- Class: Gastropoda
- Subclass: Vetigastropoda
- Family: Calliotropidae
- Genus: Calliotropis
- Species: C. abyssicola

Binomial name
- Calliotropis abyssicola Rehder & Ladd, 1973

Synonyms
- Calliotropis (Solaricida) abyssicola Rehder & Ladd, 1973

Species of Pacific Ocean sea snail

Calliotropis abyssicola is a species of sea snail, a marine gastropod mollusk in the family Eucyclidae.

== Description ==
It can have a shell size of up to 10mm.

== Distribution ==
It can be found in the Mid-Pacific Seamounts between the Marshall Islands and Hawaii.
