= Caprinid =

Caprinid may refer to animals in the following groups:

- Caprinidae, a family of extinct bivalve molluscs forming part of the Rudists
- Caprinae, a family of ruminant mammals, the goat-antelopes, including sheep, goats, musk oxen and related animals more commonly known as Caprids
