= Superswell =

Large area of anomalously high topography and shallow ocean regions

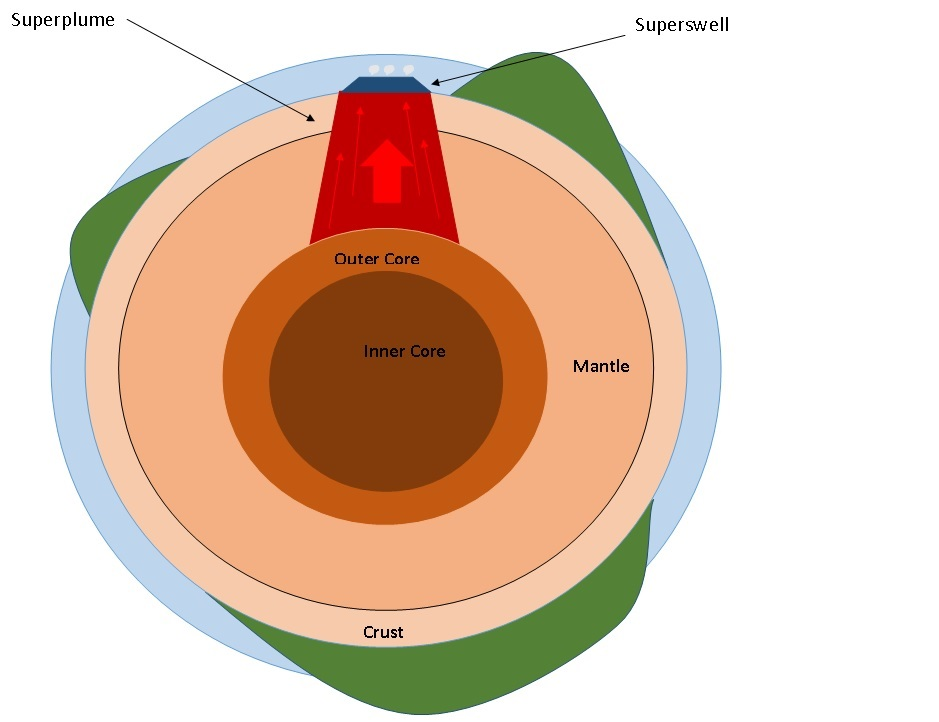
The interaction between superplumes and superswells

A superswell is a large area of anomalously high topography and shallow ocean regions. These areas of anomalous topography are byproducts of large upwelling of mantle material from the core–mantle boundary, referred to as superplumes. Two present day superswells have been identified: the African superswell and the South Pacific superswell. In addition to these, the Darwin Rise in the south central Pacific Ocean is thought to be a paleosuperswell, showing evidence of being uplifted compared to surrounding ancient ocean topography.

== Superplume ==
Data shows a dramatic increase in crustal production from 125–120 Ma to 70 Ma, largely in East Pacific Rise areas, although the marked increase in production rates of crustal material was also seen in the Gondwana ridges, as well as in oceanic plateaus. This period of increased crustal production is interpreted as a superplume event. This "pulse" of increased crustal production peaked soon after the initial plume (between 120 Ma and 100 Ma), and then declined over the next thirty million years. Along with the increase in crustal output from ridges, there is an extended period in the time frame from 125 Ma to 40 Ma where the Earth's magnetic field reversal frequency declines sharply. The last remnants of this superplume event are the South Pacific superswell located underneath Tahiti.

== Superplume mechanism of action ==
Superplume/superswell creation is a large upwelling of material. Normal upwellings in the mantle are a common occurrence, as it is generally accepted that these upwellings are the driving force behind mantle convection and subsequent plate motion. In the case of the upwelling in the mid-Cretaceous period along the East Pacific Rise, its origin lies deep within the Earth, near the core–mantle boundary. This conclusion is taken from the fact that the Earth retained a constant field polarity at the same time that this upwelling occurred.

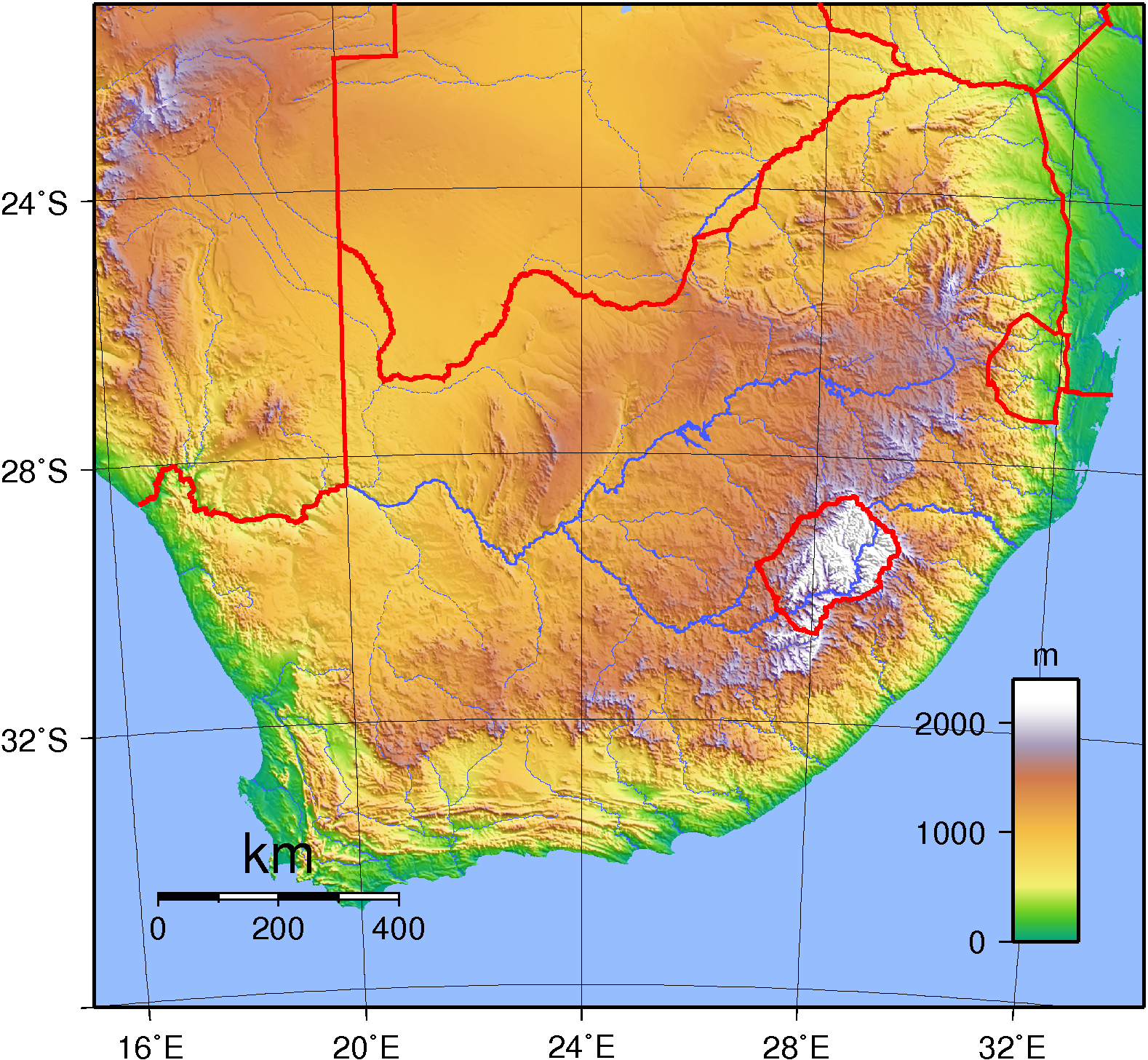
Topographic map of southern Africa

A more current superplume/superswell is in the southern and eastern region of Africa. Seismic analysis shows a large low-shear-velocity province, which coincides with a region of upwelling of semi-liquid material which is a poor conductor of seismic waves. While there are several processes at work in the formation of these high topography zones, lithospheric thinning and lithospheric heating have been unable to predict the topographic upwelling on the African plate. Dynamic topography models have, on the other hand, been able to predict this upwelling utilizing calculations of the instantaneous flow of Earth's mantle.

== Evidence for mid-Cretaceous superswell ==
Isotopic samples taken from the Pacific-Antarctic ridge basalts have disassembled the long-held belief that there was a coherent geochemical province stretching from the Australian–Antarctic discordance to the Juan de Fuca plate. Instead, samples have shown that there are instead two distinct geochemical domains above and below the Easter microplate. Measurements of the average depth of ridge axes also shows that this boundary line lies on the southeastern side of the Darwin Rise/Pacific superswell. It was concluded that this upwelling was responsible for the disparity between the two geochemical regions.

== Volcanic island chain offsets by superswell activity ==
One of the many ways that plate motions are mapped is by using hotspot activity and volcanic island chains. It is assumed that hotspots are stable relative to the motion of the island chain, and is therefore used as a point of reference. In the case of the Marquesas Islands, an island chain in the region of the South Pacific superswell, the age progression of the island chain is much shorter than models have predicted. Also, the path that these island chains take does not coincide with the motion of the plate.
