= Darwin Guyot =

Seamount in the Pacific Ocean

- Location within Pacific Ocean
- Summit depth: 1,266 metres (4,154 ft)

Location
- Coordinates: 22.0600°N 171.6350°E

Geology
- Type: Guyot

Darwin Guyot is a volcanic underwater mountain top, or guyot, in the Mid-Pacific Mountains between the Marshall Islands and Hawaii. Named after Charles Darwin, it rose above sea level more than 118 million years ago during the early Cretaceous period to become an atoll, developed rudist reefs, and then drowned, perhaps as a consequence of sea level rise. The flat top of Darwin Guyot now rests 1,266 metres (4,154 ft) below sea level.

== Name and research history ==
The name Darwin Guyot was proposed in 1970 and accepted by the Board on Geographic Names shortly thereafter; it refers to Charles Darwin and the fact that unlike other guyots in the region it resembles an atoll. On the second voyage of the Beagle, in the 1830s, Darwin had theorised that as land rose, oceanic islands sank, and coral reefs round them grew to form atolls. It was dredged and surveyed in 1968 by the ship R/V Alexander Agassiz; previously in the same year the R/V Argo had crossed over the guyot.

== Geography and geomorphology ==
Darwin Guyot lies between Hawaii and the Marshall Islands, within the submerged Mid-Pacific Mountains. Agassiz Guyot and Allison Guyot lie to its east-southeast. These underwater mountains as well as above-water atolls concentrate in the Western Pacific Ocean. Darwin Guyot may be part of a hotspot trail.

It lies at a depth of 1,285 metres (4,216 ft)-1,266 metres (4,154 ft) and has an elongated, northwest-southeast trending shape; an older survey had indicated a more rounded shape. The summit features an elevated rim which is probably a former fringing reef surrounding an internal lagoon like a bucket; this resembles the structure of present-day atolls and it is the first guyot in the Pacific Ocean that was discovered to have this atoll-like structure. This 18 metres (59 ft) deep depression may be a volcanic crater but the more likely explanation is that the rim was formed by living organisms. The whole summit plateau covers an area of 5 by 8 kilometres (3.1 mi × 5.0 mi) and the total volume of the seamount is about 2,287 cubic kilometres (549 cu mi).

Dredging has yielded no volcanic material, but chert, limestones (in the form of grainstone, packstone and wackestone) encrusted with ferromanganese as well as living animals were pulled up. The seafloor underneath the guyot lies at a depth of 5,250 metres (17,220 ft) and has an age of 157 million years.

== Geologic history ==
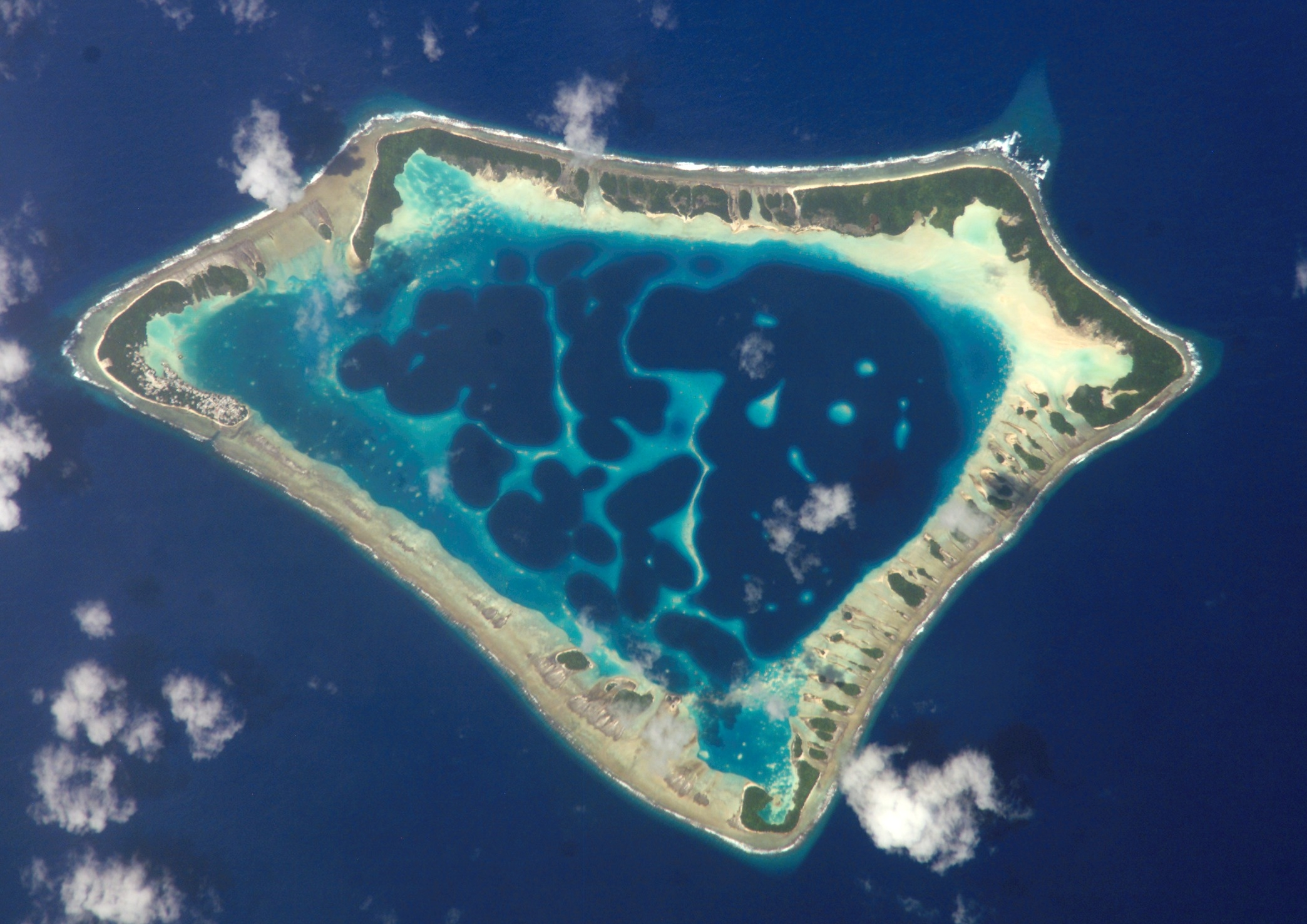
A present-day atoll in Tokelau

Darwin Guyot is considered to be of Cretaceous origin; its age exceeds 118 million years and its history might go back to the Cretaceous subdivision "Barremian". It probably started as an emergent volcanic island that was then levelled by erosion. On the resulting platform molluscs such as rudists became established. They formed the rim as well as the irregular mounds on the summit plateau. Darwin Guyot is considered to be the oldest known atoll.

Dredging has produced fossils of animals, chiefly gastropods and rudists. Fish remnants, coral debris, and foraminifera of Albian to Turonian age have also been found. Rudists formed organic frameworks resembling coral reefs on Darwin Guyot and elsewhere in Tethyan seas during the Albian-Aptian eras. Other environments such as seagrass flats and lagoons have been inferred from the fossils.

The resulting carbonate platform drowned about 100 million years ago, or at the time of the Cenomanian-Turonian boundary event (94 million years ago). It is not clear why the reefs on Darwin Guyot eventually ceased growing; one possibility is that sea levels rose quickly enough to overwhelm the ability of the reef forming organisms to keep up. Unlike other guyots, Darwin Guyot did not accumulate a substantial cap of pelagic sediments after drowning; perhaps it is too small to accumulate a substantial sediment layer or sedimentation took place but ocean currents swept the sediment off the platform. Presently, fish such as snubnosed eels occur at Darwin Guyot.
