= Mid-Pacific Mountains =

Underwater mountain range in the Pacific Ocean

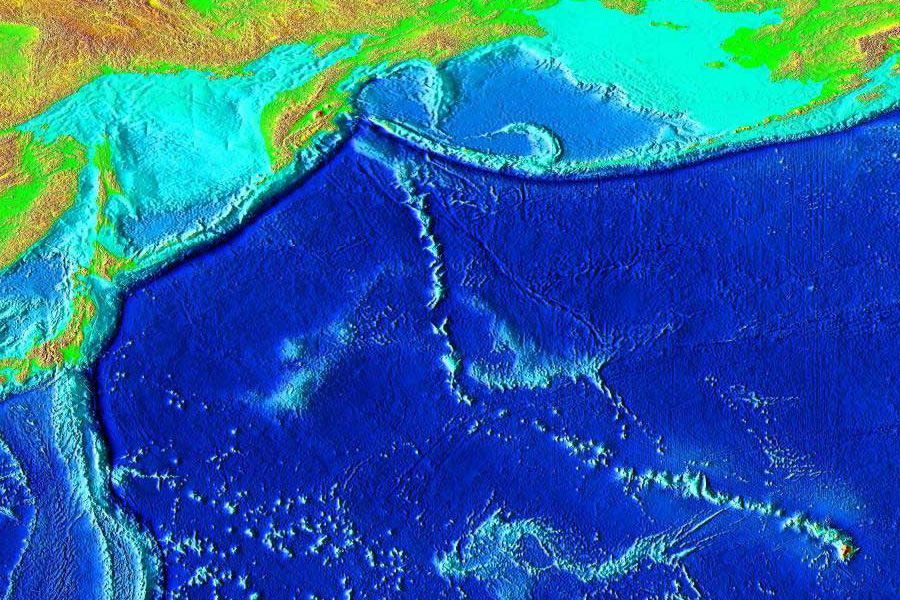
Location

The Mid-Pacific Mountains (MPM) is a large oceanic plateau located in the central North Pacific Ocean or south of the Hawaiian–Emperor seamount chain. Of volcanic origin and Mesozoic in age, it is located on the oldest part of the Pacific Plate and rises up to 2 km (1.2 mi) (Darwin Rise) above the surrounding ocean floor and is covered with several layers of thick sedimentary sequences that differ from those of other plateaux in the North Pacific. About 50 seamounts are distributed over the MPM. Some of the highest points in the range are above sea level which include Wake Island and Marcus Island.

The ocean floor of the MPM dates back to the Jurassic-Cretaceous, some of the oldest oceanic crust on Earth.

The MPM is a range of guyots with a lava composition similar to those found in Iceland and the Galapagos Islands, and they probably formed similarly at or near a rift system. In the Cretaceous, they formed large tropical islands located closer to the Equator that began to sink in the late Mesozoic.

The MPM formed in the Early Cretaceous (at c. 110 Ma) over a hotspot that uplifted the ocean floor of the still young Pacific Plate. Reefs developed on the subsiding islands and renewed volcanism in the Late Cretaceous helped maintain some of eastern islands but inevitably the guyots sank to their present depth. It has been proposed that the MPM has crossed over several hotspots, and the MPM guyots are indeed older on the western MPM than the eastern part, but the guyots do not form chains that can be traced to any known hotspots. The MPM, nevertheless, must have originated over the South Pacific Superswell. Among the guyots in the Mid-Pacific Mountains are Allison Guyot, Horizon Guyot, Resolution Guyot and Darwin Guyot.

The western half of the Easter hotspot chain, a lineament that includes the Line Islands and Tuamotu archipelago, begins near the eastern part of the MPM. The formation of the MPM thus probably occurred at the Pacific-Farallon Ridge and the Easter hotspot, or where the Easter Microplate is now located.

== Sources ==
=== General and cited sources ===
- Clouard, V.; Bonneville, A. (2001). "How many Pacific hotspots are fed by deep-mantle plumes?". Geology. 29 (8): 695–698. Bibcode:2001Geo....29..695C. doi:10.1130/0091-7613(2001)029<0695:HMPHAF>2.0.CO;2.
- Hamilton, E. L. (1956). "Sunken Islands of the Mid-Pacific Mountains". 64 : Sunken Islands of the Mid-Pacific Mountains. Geological Society of America Memoirs. Vol. 64. Geological Society of America. pp. 1–92. doi:10.1130/MEM64-p1.
- Karig, D. E.; Peterson, M. N. A.; Short, G. G. (1970). "Sediment-capped guyots in the Mid-Pacific Mountains". Deep Sea Research and Oceanographic Abstracts. 17 (2): 373–378. Bibcode:1970DSRA...17..373K. doi:10.1016/0011-7471(70)90029-X.
- Kroenke, L. W.; Kellogg, J. N.; Nemoto, K. (1985). "Mid-pacific mountains revisited". Geo-marine Letters. 5 (2): 77–81. Bibcode:1985GML.....5...77K. doi:10.1007/BF02233931. S2CID 129287640.
- Menard, H. W. (1959). "Geology of the Pacific sea floor". Experientia. 1 (6): 205–213. doi:10.1007/BF02158108. S2CID 9383923.
- Thiede, J.; Dean, W. E.; Rea, D. K.; Vallier, T. L.; Adelseck, C. G. (1981). "The geologic history of the Mid-Pacific Mountains in the central North Pacific Ocean: a synthesis of deep-sea drilling studies". Initial Reports of the Deep Sea Drilling Project. 62: 1073–1120. doi:10.2973/dsdp.proc.62.162.1981.
- Wilde, P. (2010). "Supervolcanoes in the Mid-Pacific Mountains?". AGU Fall Meeting Abstracts. 13: V13C–2368. Bibcode:2010AGUFM.V13C2368W.
- Winterer, E. L.; Metzler, C. V. (1984). "Origin and subsidence of guyots in Mid‐Pacific Mountains". Journal of Geophysical Research: Solid Earth. 89 (B12): 9969–9979. Bibcode:1984JGR....89.9969W. doi:10.1029/JB089iB12p09969.
- Winterer, E. L.; Sager, W. W.; Firth, J. V.; Sinton, J. M. (1995). "31. Synthesis of Drilling Results From the Mid-Pacific Mountains: Regional Context and Implications". Proceedings of the Ocean Drilling Program, Scientific Results. 143.
