= Allison Guyot =

Seamount in the Pacific Ocean

- Location within Pacific Ocean
- Height: 1.5 kilometres (4,900 ft)
- Summit area: 35 by 70 kilometres (22 mi × 43 mi)

Location
- Group: Mid-Pacific Mountains
- Coordinates: 18.26°N 179.33°E

Geology
- Type: Guyot

Allison Guyot (formerly known as Navoceano Guyot) is a tablemount (guyot) in the underwater Mid-Pacific Mountains of the Pacific Ocean. It is a trapezoidal flat mountain rising 1,500 metres (4,900 ft) above the seafloor to a depth of less than 1,500 metres (4,900 ft), with a summit platform 35 by 70 kilometres (22 by 43 mi) wide. The Mid-Pacific Mountains lie west of Hawaii and northeast of the Marshall Islands, but at the time of their formation were located in the Southern Hemisphere.

The tablemount was probably formed by a hotspot in the present-day Southern Pacific before plate tectonics moved it to its current location. Several hotspots, including the Easter, Marquesas and Society hotspots, may have been involved in the formation of the Mid-Pacific Mountains. Volcanic activity is dated to have occurred circa 111–85 million years ago and formed a volcanic island. Subsequently, carbonate deposition commenced as Allison Guyot subsided and eventually buried the island, forming an atoll-like structure and a carbonate platform. Among other animals, crocodilians lived on Allison Guyot.

The platform emerged above sea level during the Albian and Turonian ages. It drowned about 99 ± 2 million years ago for unknown reasons; possibly a phase of renewed emergence damaged the reefs, or it was located in unfavourable waters. Later, pelagic sedimentation commenced on the seamount and led to the deposition of sediments including limestone, ooze and sand, which bear traces of climatic events and ocean currents.

== Name and research history ==
Allison Guyot is named after E.C. Allison, an oceanographer and paleontologist at the San Diego State College; formerly it was named "Navoceano Guyot". The name "Hamilton Guyot" has also been applied to Allison Guyot but is not correct; Hamilton Guyot is a separate formation in the Mid-Pacific Mountains. The seamount is the source of the Ocean Drilling Program (Note: The Ocean Drilling Program was a multinational research program that aimed at elucidating the geological history of the sea by obtaining drill cores from the oceans and lasted from 1983 to 2003.) drill core 865A, which was bored into the summit platform of Allison Guyot in 1992 but did not reach the volcanic structure of the underwater mountain. Two other cores 865C and 865B were obtained during the same operation; Allison Guyot is Site 865 Ocean Drilling Program. These drill cores were part of a larger project to investigate and clarify the history of the flat-topped submarine mountains in the Pacific Ocean.

== Geography and geology ==
=== Local setting ===
Allison Guyot is located in the equatorial Pacific Ocean, part of the western Mid-Pacific Mountains. The Mid-Pacific Mountains contain seamounts which were covered by limestones during the Barremian and Albian (circa 129.4 – circa 125 million years ago and circa 113–100.5 million years ago, respectively). Hawaii lies due east and the Marshall Islands southwest; Resolution Guyot is 716 kilometres northwest.

The guyot (also known as tablemount) has an outline resembling a trapezoid and consists of two connected volcanic ridges facing north-northwest to east-northeast. Its western parts may be a distinct volcano. The surface platform has dimensions of 35 by 70 kilometres, with an upwards-doming form 0.3–0.5 kilometres high, and is covered by large sediment mounds; the rim surrounding the platform lies at a depth of about 1,650 metres and there is evidence of former reefs. The structure appears to consist of lagoonal sediments surrounded by a reef, and the shallowest point of Allison Guyot lies at less than 1,500 metres (4,900 ft) depth below sea level. Volcanic cones dot the eastern side of the summit plateau. The seamount bears traces of slumping, which on the southeastern side of Allison Guyot has removed part of the platform perimeter.

The seamount rises 1.5 kilometres above the seafloor. Underneath Allison Guyot, the seafloor is about 130–119 million years old, and a 128-million year-old magnetic lineation is located nearby. The Molokai fracture zone forms a ridge which passes close to Allison Guyot and intersects with another ridge at the seamount. Tectonically the seamount is part of the Pacific plate.

=== Regional setting ===
Diagram showing a cross section through the Earth's lithosphere (in yellow) with magma rising from the mantle (in red)

The west central and south central Pacific Ocean seafloor contains many guyots of the Mesozoic age that developed in seas shallower than typical of the present-day ocean. These are submarine mountains which are characterised by a flat top and usually the presence of carbonate platforms that rose above the sea surface during the middle Cretaceous period. Many of these seamounts were formerly atolls, though there are some differences to present-day reef systems. All these structures originally formed as volcanoes in the Mesozoic ocean. The crust underneath these volcanoes tends to subside as it cools, and thus the islands and seamounts sink. Fringing reefs may have developed on the volcanoes, which then became barrier reefs as the volcanoes subside and turn into atolls; these rims surround lagoons or tidal flats. Continued subsidence offset by growth of the reefs led to the formation of thick carbonate platforms. Sometimes volcanic activity continued after the formation of the atoll or atoll-like structure, and during episodes where the platforms rose above sea level erosional features such as channels and blue holes (Note: Pit-like depressions within carbonate rocks that are filled with water.) developed. Eventually, these platforms drowned for reasons that are often unclear.

The formation of many such seamounts has been explained with the hotspot theory, which describes the formation of chains of volcanoes that get progressively older along the length of the chain, with an active volcano only at one end of the system. This volcano lies on a spot of the lithosphere heated from below; as the plate moves the volcano is moved away from the heat source and volcanic activity ceases, producing a chain of volcanoes that become older away from the currently active one.

The "South Pacific Superswell" is a region in the Southern Pacific at the present-day Austral Islands, Cook Islands and Society Islands, where intense volcanic activity was underway during the Cretaceous, and is where the Cretaceous seamounts of the Mid-Pacific Mountains originated. The Easter hotspot, Marquesas hotspot and the Society hotspot may have been involved in the formation of the Mid-Pacific Mountains. After the Mountains had formed, plate tectonics shifted them northwards to their present-day position. Allison Guyot appears to have formed in the same region.

=== Composition ===
One drill core on Allison Guyot has found a 136-metre-thick layer of pelagic sediments, under which are 735-metre-thick limestones that formed in lagoons and might continue down for almost 600 metres. The limestone consists mostly of calcite with little dolomite and occurs in the form of bafflestone, grainstone, packstone, peloid, rudstone and wackestone; ooliths have also been found. The carbonates are of biogenic origin, and fossils of dasyclads, echinoderms, gastropods, green algae, molluscs, ostracods, oysters, red algae, rudists and sponges occur within the limestones; some of the fossils have partially dissolved and are thus poorly preserved. Remnants of crocodilians have been found within Aptian (Note: Between circa 125 and 113 million years ago)–Albian mudstones, together with fossils of fish and unidentified vertebrates. The limestone is partly altered by karstification and phosphatisation, and manganese has accumulated in the upper layers and phosphorite under the surface sediments.

Basalts occur in the form of cobbles and sills within the limestones. These basalts define an alkali basalt suite and contain clinopyroxene, feldspar, ilmenite, plagioclase, pyroxene, spinel and titanomagnetite. They probably also contained olivine but the basaltic rocks sampled are so heavily altered that no olivine is left. The basalts are typical of intraplate volcanism and their geochemistry shows evidence that fractional crystallisation and mixing between different magmas were involved in their genesis. The component minerals have often been completely altered to calcite, clays, gypsum, hematite, quartz and other, unidentified minerals, either when exposed above sea level or through hydrothermal fluids when the sills formed. The formation of the sills led to the hardening and hydrothermal alteration of the surrounding sediments.

Clays are found both within the limestones and in layers between the carbonates. They consist of berthierine, chlorite, feldspar, hydromica, illite, kaolinite, mica, quartz, serpentine, smectite and possible zeolite. The clays were in part derived from lateritic soils that developed on the volcanic island before they were completely buried in carbonates, and in part formed in settings with limited water exchange during lagoonal stages. Dolomite, gypsum and pyrite co-occur with some clays, and claystones (Note: Clays that became solid rocks.) have been found in some places. Mudstones with evidence of animal burrows and containing amber, glauconite, organic material including plant debris and pyrite have also been encountered; pyrite indicates that anoxic environments existed on Allison Guyot.

Black shale and coal form layers in one drill core. The lower limestones contain substantial amounts of organic material that originated from terrestrial settings, and remnants of animal burrows and plant roots have been found in many layers of the platform. The clays and mudstones are rich in organic material. Most of this organic material appears to come from plants but some material has been attributed to algae. Cells and tracheids can be found in the plant remnants.

== Geological history ==
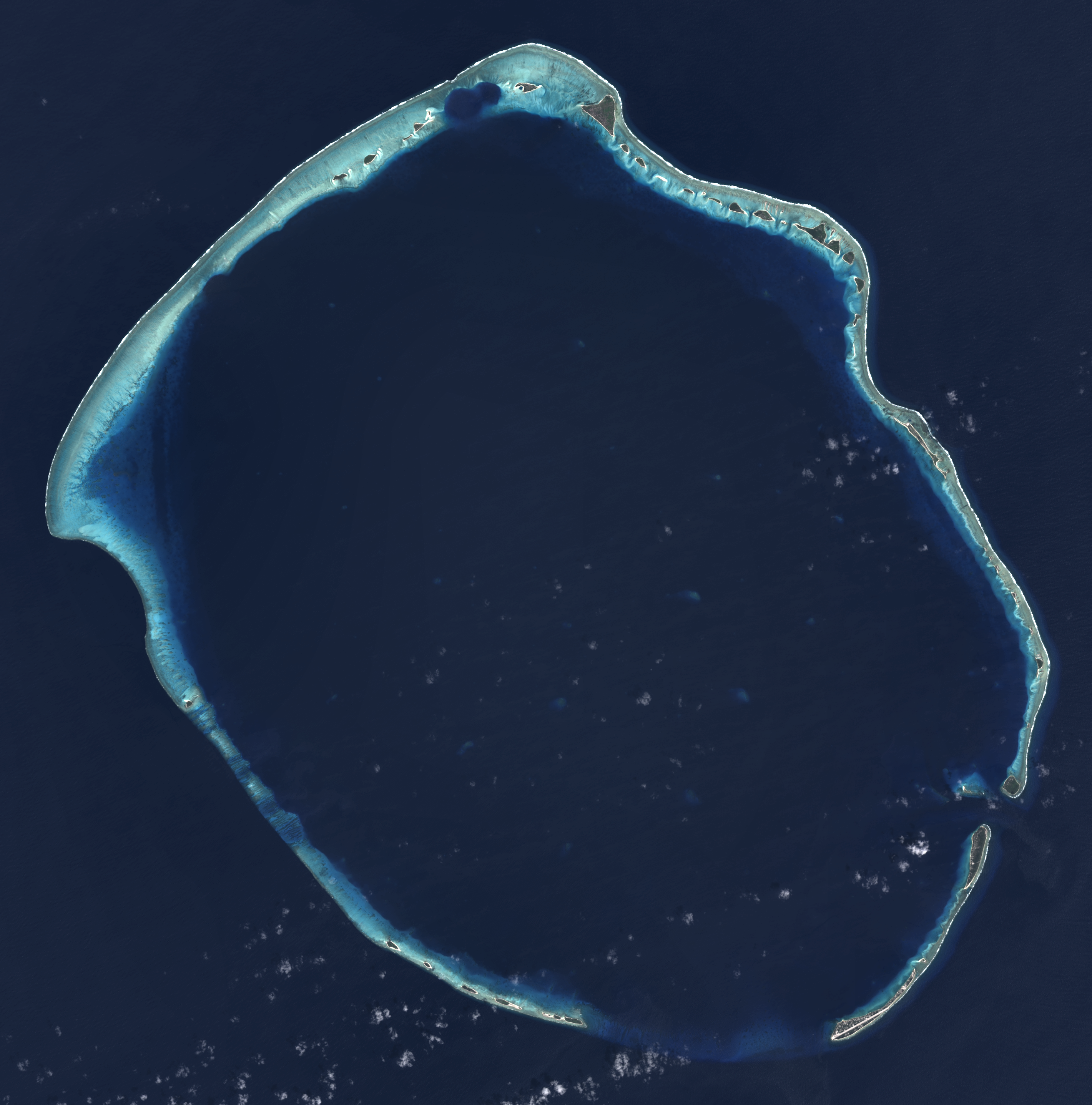
Eniwetok Atoll today. Allison Guyot may have resembled Eniwetok in the past.

Radiometric dating has been performed on some of the volcanic rocks. Potassium–argon dating on the sills has yielded ages of 102 ± 6 million years ago and 87 ± 3 million years ago, while argon–argon dating also on the sills produced ages of 111.1 ± 2.6 million years, 111.2 ± 1.2 million years ago and 104.8 ± 0.8 million years ago. Other ages from the sills are about 110.7 ± 1.2 million years ago and 104.9 ± 2.0 million years ago. Rocks dredged from the slopes of Allison Guyot have yielded ages of 101.2 ± 0.8 million years, 102.7 ± 2.7 million years and 85.6 ± 1.3 million years ago. Overall, the volcano is considered to be at least 111 million years old and volcanic activity probably spanned 30–25 million years and several stages.

Both the sills and the dredged rocks were probably erupted after the main shield stage and they may constitute a late stage of secondary volcanism; two or three separate stages might have taken place, including one which formed a secondary cone on the eastern side of Allison Guyot. This may indicate that the seamount passed over more than one hotspot. The volcano of Allison Guyot was apparently already partially eroded when the secondary volcanism took place. Paleomagnetic data taken from limestones show that Allison Guyot developed in the Southern Hemisphere, at a latitude of about 11.2° ± 2.0° south.

=== Emergent phase ===
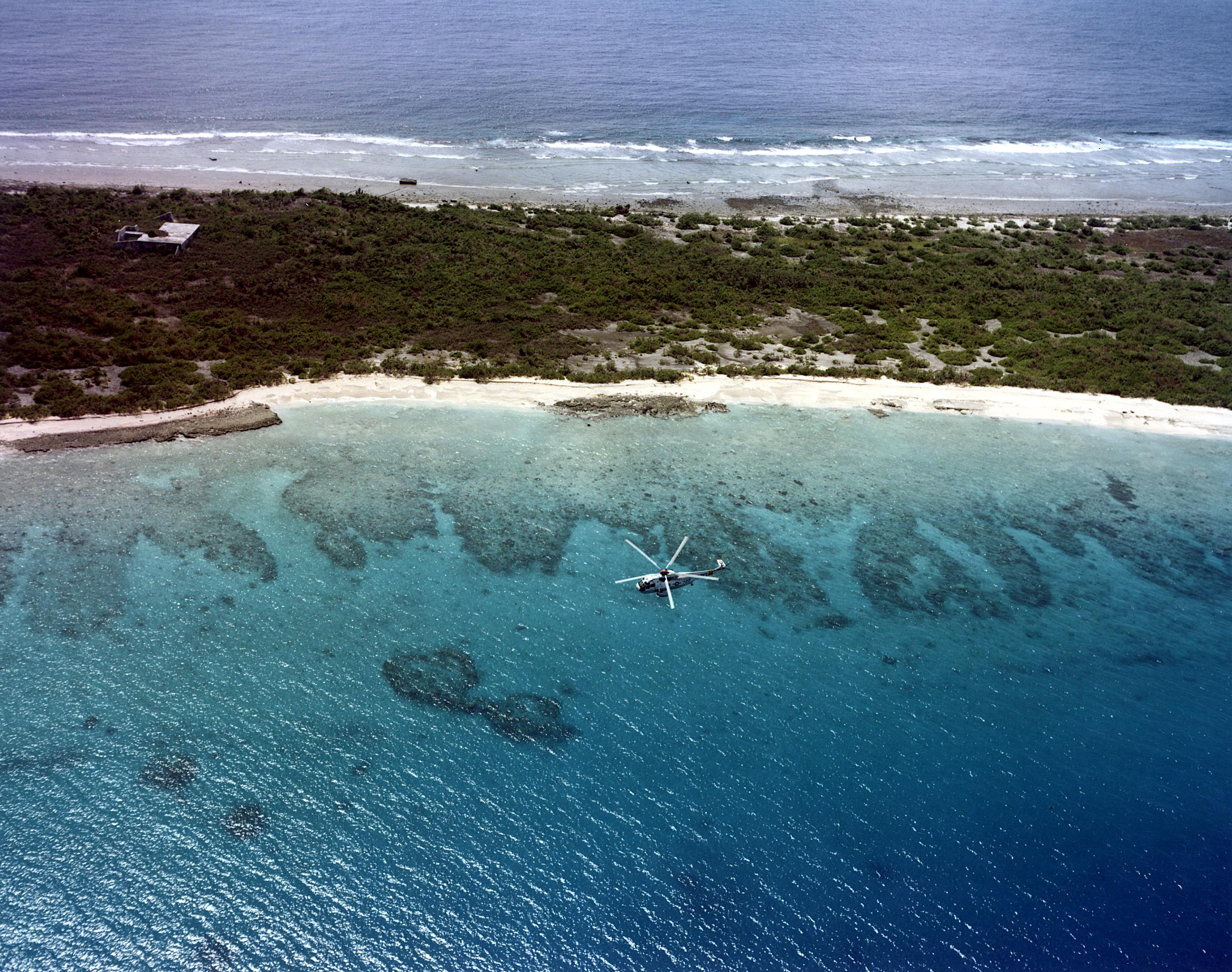
Aerial image of the rim of Bikini Atoll. Allison Guyot during its carbonate platform stage may have resembled Bikini.

Allison Guyot began as a volcanic island with a relief of perhaps 1.3 kilometres. Located in equatorial waters suited to the deposition of carbonate platforms, limestone platform grew on the guyot as it rapidly subsided during the Albian. Some volcanic activity occurred as limestone was being emplaced, causing alteration of the limestone to dolomite and the emplacement of sills. Eventually, the seamount became an atoll. Volcanic rocks cropped out for some time before they were buried into the carbonates, and weathering products of the volcanic rocks accumulated in the limestones. The islands were covered by vegetation, and vegetation cover decreased over time as the volcanic edifice sank. The climate was probably humid and runoff was intense.

The platform contains lagoon and swamp environments, with water depths not exceeding 10 metres, and at some stage contained sand shoals and islands formed by storms as well. The interior was not protected from the sea and the sector of the platform that was investigated by drill cores apparently became increasingly accessible to it over time. The inner platform had a quiet muddy water setting; generally Allison Guyot at that time resembled the present-day Bikini and Eniwetok atolls in terms of morphology when Allison Guyot was emergent.

The carbonate deposits indicate sea level changes following orbital cycles consistent with Milankovitch forcing; parts of the platform occasionally rose above sea level. At some point, karst environments existed on Allison Guyot and are probably the reason for the irregular surface of the summit platform and the presence of sinkholes; there are clear indications of about 200 metres of emergence.

Bivalves including rudists, corals, echinoderms, foraminifera, green algae, hydrozoans, red algae and sponges have been found in the platform's deposits. Rudists were at that time important reef builders and together with sponges colonised the margin of the platform. Among the rudist species discovered on Allison Guyot is Requienia cf. migliorinii. Teeth of crocodilians have been found on the seamount. Its 110 million years old remnants are the oldest known crocodilians in the region of the Pacific Ocean. They indicate that such species lived within the lagoon of Allison Guyot and may give clues about the history of Pacific animals and their dispersal.

=== Drowning and post-drowning evolution ===
A carbonate platform is said to 'drown' when sedimentation can no longer keep up with relative rises in sea level. Carbonate sedimentation on Allison Guyot ended during late Albian times, about 99 ± 2 million years ago, at the same time as at Resolution Guyot. By Turonian times (93.9 – 89.8 ± 0.3 million years ago), pelagic sedimentation was prevailing on Allison Guyot. On both Allison and Resolution Guyots, the drowning was preceded by an episode where the platform rose above the sea; possibly it was this emergence and the following submergence which terminated carbonate deposition and prevented it from beginning again. Such emergence and drowning has been recorded at carbonate platforms of that age around the world and may be the consequence of tectonic events across the Pacific Ocean, culminating in the uplift of a part thereof. At that time, a last phase of volcanic activity on Allison Guyot generated several cones on its eastern part. The evidence for this theory is not conclusive, and another theory holds that the drowning of Allison Guyot occurred when it moved through equatorial waters, where upwelling increased the amount of nutrients available, hampering the growth of platforms. (Note: Increased nutrient levels favour plankton growth and reduce the amount of sunlight available to symbiotic organisms in the platform builders.) The waters might also have been too hot to support the survival of reef builders, as happens in present-day coral bleaching events.

About 160 metres (Note: Some of which was later probably eroded away.) of pelagic sediment in the form of sand, ooze and pelagic limestone accumulated on Allison Guyot; pelagic limestone is of Turonian to Campanian (83.6 ± 0.2 − 72.1 ± 0.2 million years ago) age while the oozes and sands were deposited starting in the early Paleocene (66–56 million years ago). In drill cores, the ooze has a sandy, watery habitus owing to the prevalence of fossil foraminifera in the sediment. The pelagic sediments have been bioturbated (Note: Animals have stirred, mixed and otherwise modified the sediments.) in some places and modified by sea currents, which have formed the large mound of pelagic sediment. In drill cores, the ooze overlies Cretaceous shallow-water limestones, which were modified by phosphatisation and manganese accumulation. As plate tectonics moved Allison Guyot northward, its surrounding water masses changed, as did the properties of the pelagic cap. Slumping of the platform occurred during the Cenozoic (the last 66 million years). Seawater permeates the seamount.

The pelagic ooze bears evidence of the Paleocene–Eocene thermal maximum, (Note: The Paleocene–Eocene Thermal Maximum was an episode of extreme global warmth about 55.5 million years ago, during which temperatures rose by about 5–8 °C.) including temporary dissolution of carbonates, changes in the isotope ratios of carbon in sediments on Allison Guyot and changes in foraminifera and ostracod fossils found in the ooze. The latter underwent a major extinction during the Paleocene–Eocene Thermal Maximum on the seamount and took a long time to recover.

Sea currents have altered the pelagic deposits by removing smaller particles. In particular deposits from warmer periods have been altered in this way on Allison Guyot, perhaps because warmer climates increased hurricane activity and thus the energy available in sea currents or deep-sea circulations shifted. Furthermore, pauses in the sedimentation or episodes of slowdown have been identified.

== Sources ==
- Arreguín-Rodríguez, Gabriela J.; Alegret, Laia; Thomas, Ellen (March 2016). "Late Paleocene–middle Eocene benthic foraminifera on a Pacific seamount (Allison Guyot, ODP Site 865): Greenhouse climate and superimposed hyperthermal events". Paleoceanography. 31 (3): 346–364. Bibcode:2016PalOc..31..346A. doi:10.1002/2015pa002837. ISSN 0883-8305.
- Baker, P.E.; Castillo, P.R.; Condliffe, E. (May 1995). "Petrology and Geochemistry of Igneous Rocks from Allison and Resolution Guyots, Sites 865 and 866" (PDF). Proceedings of the Ocean Drilling Program, 143 Scientific Results. Vol. 143. Ocean Drilling Program. pp. 245–261. doi:10.2973/odp.proc.sr.143.216.1995.
- Baudin, F.; Deconinck, J.-F.; Sachsenhofer, R.F.; Strasser, A.; Arnaud, H. (May 1995). "Organic Geochemistry and Clay Mineralogy of Lower Cretaceous Sediments from Allison and Resolution Guyots (Sites 865 and 866), Mid-Pacific Mountains" (PDF). Proceedings of the Ocean Drilling Program, 143 Scientific Results. Vol. 143. Ocean Drilling Program. pp. 173–196. doi:10.2973/odp.proc.sr.143.220.1995.
- Baudin, François; Sachsenhofer, Reinhard F. (December 1996). "Organic geochemistry of Lower Cretaceous sediments from Northwestern Pacific guyots (ODP leg 143)". Organic Geochemistry. 25 (5–7): 311–324. Bibcode:1996OrGeo..25..311B. doi:10.1016/S0146-6380(96)00122-2. ISSN 0146-6380.
- Bralower, T.J; Mutterlose, J. (May 1995). "Calcareous Nannofossil Biostratigraphy of Site 865, Allison Guyot, Central Pacific Ocean: A Tropical Paleogene Reference Section" (PDF). Proceedings of the Ocean Drilling Program, 143 Scientific Results. Vol. 143. Ocean Drilling Program. pp. 31–47. doi:10.2973/odp.proc.sr.143.204.1995.
- Bralower, Timothy J.; Zachos, James C.; Thomas, Ellen; Parrow, Matthew; Paull, Charles K.; Kelly, D. Clay; Silva, Isabella Premoli; Sliter, William V.; Lohmann, Kyger C. (August 1995). "Late Paleocene to Eocene paleoceanography of the equatorial Pacific Ocean: Stable isotopes recorded at Ocean Drilling Program Site 865, Allison Guyot". Paleoceanography. 10 (4): 841–865. Bibcode:1995PalOc..10..841B. doi:10.1029/95pa01143. ISSN 0883-8305. S2CID 42148885.
- El-Yamani, Mahmoud Samir; John, Cédric M.; Bell, Rebecca (May 2024). "Mechanism of island dolostones formation in the Cretaceous calcitic ocean: Insights from the Mid-Pacific Guyots". Marine and Petroleum Geology. 163 106741. doi:10.1016/j.marpetgeo.2024.106741.
- Grötsch, Jürgen; Flügel, Erik (December 1992). "Facies of sunken early cretaceous atoll reefs and their capping Late Albian drowning succession (Northwestern Pacific)". Facies. 27 (1): 153–174. Bibcode:1992Faci...27..153G. doi:10.1007/bf02536809. ISSN 0172-9179. S2CID 128544669.
- Jenkyns, Hugh C.; Wilson, Paul A. (1 May 1999). "Stratigraphy, paleoceanography, and evolution of Cretaceous Pacific guyots; relics from a greenhouse Earth". American Journal of Science. 299 (5): 341–392. Bibcode:1999AmJS..299..341J. doi:10.2475/ajs.299.5.341. ISSN 0002-9599.
- Kurnosov, V.; Zolotarev, B.; Eroshchev-Shak, V.; Artamonov, A.; Kashinzev, Murdmaa (December 1995). "Alteration of Basalts from the West Pacific Guyots, Legs 143 and 144" (PDF). Proceedings of the Ocean Drilling Program, 144 Scientific Results. Vol. 144. Ocean Drilling Program. pp. 475–491. doi:10.2973/odp.proc.sr.144.068.1995.
- Iryu, Yasufumi; Yamada, Tsutomu (December 1999). "Biogeochemical contrasts between mid-Cretaceous carbonate platforms and Cenozoic reefs". The Island Arc. 8 (4): 475–490. Bibcode:1999IsArc...8..475I. doi:10.1046/j.1440-1738.1999.00250.x. ISSN 1038-4871. S2CID 128968750.
- Janney, Philip E.; Castillo, Paterno R. (10 May 1999). "Isotope geochemistry of the Darwin Rise seamounts and the nature of long-term mantle dynamics beneath the south central Pacific". Journal of Geophysical Research: Solid Earth. 104 (B5): 10571–10589. Bibcode:1999JGR...10410571J. doi:10.1029/1998JB900061.
- Murdmaa, I.; Kurnosov, V.and Vasilyeva (December 1995). "Clay Mineralogy of the Shallow-Water Deposits on Allison and Resolution Guyots, Sites 865 and 866" (PDF). Proceedings of the Ocean Drilling Program, 144 Scientific Results. Vol. 144. Ocean Drilling Program. pp. 459–468. doi:10.2973/odp.proc.sr.144.069.1995.
- Paull, C.K.; Fullagar, P.D.; Bralower, T.J.; Rohl, U. (May 1995). "Seawater Ventilation of Mid-Pacific Guyots Drilled during Leg 143" (PDF). Proceedings of the Ocean Drilling Program, 143 Scientific Results. Vol. 143. Ocean Drilling Program. pp. 231–241. doi:10.2973/odp.proc.sr.143.222.1995.
- Pringle, Malcolm S.; Sager, William W.; Sliter, William V.; Stein, Seth (1993). Pringle, Malcolm S.; Sager, William W.; Sliter, William V.; Stein, Seth (eds.). The Mesozoic Pacific: Geology, Tectonics, and Volcanism: A Volume in Memory of Sy Schlanger. Washington DC American Geophysical Union Geophysical Monograph Series. Vol. 77. Bibcode:1993GMS....77.....P. doi:10.1029/gm077. ISBN 978-0-87590-036-0.
- Röhl, Ursula; Ogg, James G. (October 1996). "Aptian–Albian sea level history from Guyots in the western Pacific". Paleoceanography. 11 (5): 595–624. Bibcode:1996PalOc..11..595R. doi:10.1029/96pa01928. ISSN 0883-8305.
- Röhl, U.; Strasser, A. (May 1995). "Diagenetic Alterations and Geochemical Trends in Early Cretaceous Shallow-Water Limestones of Allison and Resolution Guyots (Sites 865 to 868)" (PDF). Proceedings of the Ocean Drilling Program, 143 Scientific Results. Vol. 143. Ocean Drilling Program. pp. 197–229. doi:10.2973/odp.proc.sr.143.224.1995.
- Sager, W.W.; Tarduno, J.A. (May 1995). "Paleolatitude Inferred from Cretaceous Sediments, Hole 865A, Allison Guyot, Mid-Pacific Mountains" (PDF). Proceedings of the Ocean Drilling Program, 143 Scientific Results. Vol. 143. Ocean Drilling Program. pp. 399–403. doi:10.2973/odp.proc.sr.143.250.1995.
- Shipboard Scientific Party (April 1993). "Synthesis of Results" (PDF). Proceedings of the Ocean Drilling Program, 143 Initial Reports. Vol. 143. Ocean Drilling Program. pp. 13–29. doi:10.2973/odp.proc.ir.143.103.1993.
- Sliter, W.V. (May 1995). "Cretaceous Planktonic Foraminifers from Sites 865, 866, and 869: A Synthesis of Cretaceous Pelagic Sedimentation in the Central Pacific Ocean Basin" (PDF). Proceedings of the Ocean Drilling Program, 143 Scientific Results. Vol. 143. Ocean Drilling Program. pp. 15–30. doi:10.2973/odp.proc.sr.143.202.1995.
- Swinburne, N.H.M.; Masse, J.-P. (May 1995). "Early Cretaceous Rudist Fauna of Allison and Resolution Guyots, Mid-Pacific Mountains" (PDF). Proceedings of the Ocean Drilling Program, 143 Scientific Results. Vol. 143. Ocean Drilling Program. pp. 3–14. doi:10.2973/odp.proc.sr.143.207.1995.
- Winterer, Edward L.; Sager, William W.; Firth, John V. (1992). "Ocean Drilling Program; Leg 143 preliminary report, Northwest Pacific atolls and guyots" (PDF). Ocean Drilling Program, Texas A & M University, College Station, TX, United States. College Station, Texas.
- Winterer, E.L.; Sager, W.W. (May 1995). "Synthesis of Drilling Results from the Mid-Pacific Mountains: Regional Context and Implications" (PDF). Proceedings of the Ocean Drilling Program, 143 Scientific Results. Vol. 143. Ocean Drilling Program. pp. 497–535. doi:10.2973/odp.proc.sr.143.245.1995.
