= Darwin Rise =

Region in north central Pacific Ocean

Coordinates: 10°N 180°W

Location in the Pacific Ocean

The Darwin Rise is a broad triangular region in the north central Pacific Ocean where there is a concentration of atolls.

During his voyage across the globe Charles Darwin realised that vertical crustal motion must be responsible for the formation of continents and ocean basins, as well as isolated atolls in the Pacific. He deduced that the central basin of the Pacific had subsided while surrounding areas had risen. In 1964 U.S. geologist Henry Menard subsequently named the uplifted area in the Pacific after the English naturalist.

== Geological context ==
Covering an area of 12,000 km × 3,000 km (7,500 mi × 1,900 mi), the Darwin Rise is limited to the east by the Izu–Bonin and Mariana trenches, to the west by the Line Islands. Two major plateaux, the Shatsky Rise to the north and the Ontong Java Plateau to the south, border the Darwin Rise. How these plateaux relate to the rise remains disputed.

There are six major chains of seamounts on the rise – the Japanese, Magellan, Wake, Marshall Islands, and Line Islands seamounts, and the Mid-Pacific Mountains – and numerous minor clusters. The ages of these seamounts in general follow the motion of the Pacific Plate from 130 to 180 Ma, as predicted by conventional hotspot theory, and decrease from west to east and north to south. This age-distance pattern is, however, not corroborated by the limited data available.

== Origin ==
In 1964, Henry Menard proposed that this was a superswell raised by volcanism during the Cretaceous (120–80 Ma). A problem with this conjecture is that this region actually has a sea floor at a normal depth that happens to possess an abundance of seamounts.

Instead this feature may have formed from diapirs or plumes rising from the Earth's upper mantle, which results in chains of sea mounts along the direction of the plate motion. However, this idea remains in dispute and an alternate hypothesis involving multiple "plumelets" has been proposed.

In the 1980s it was proposed that the Darwin Rise was the South Pacific Superswell at 100 Ma and that the volcanoes of the Darwin Rise erupted over the same mantle region as the volcanoes of French Polynesia today. Hence, U.S. geologist Marcia McNutt proposed that the Darwin Rise is a palaeo-superswell.

== See also ==
- Geology of the Pacific Ocean
- Magellan Rise (ocean plateau)
