= Dynamic topography =

Elevation changes caused by the flow within Earth's mantle

The term dynamic topography is used in geodynamics to refer the elevation differences caused by the flow within Earth's mantle.

== Definition ==
In geodynamics, dynamic topography refers to topography generated by the motion of zones of differing degrees of buoyancy (convection) in Earth's mantle. It is also seen as the residual topography obtained by removing the isostatic contribution from the observed topography (i.e., the topography that cannot be explained by an isostatic equilibrium of the crust or the lithosphere resting on a fluid mantle) and all observed topography due to post-glacial rebound. Elevation differences due to dynamic topography are frequently on the order of a few hundred meters to a couple of kilometers. Large scale surface features due to dynamic topography are mid-ocean ridges and oceanic trenches. Other prominent examples include areas overlying mantle plumes such as the African superswell. For a recent review of observational and modelling constraints on dynamic topography, see Davies et al. (2023).

The mid-ocean ridges are high due to dynamic topography because the upwelling hot material underneath them pushes them up above the surrounding seafloor. This provides an important driving force in plate tectonics called ridge push: the increased gravitational potential energy of the mid-ocean ridge due to its dynamic uplift causes it to extend and push the surrounding lithosphere away from the ridge axis. Dynamic topography and mantle density variations can explain 90% of the long-wavelength geoid after the hydrostatic ellipsoid is subtracted out.

Dynamic topography is the reason why the geoid is high over regions of low-density mantle. If the mantle were static, these low-density regions would be geoid lows. However, these low-density regions move upwards in a mobile, convecting mantle, elevating density interfaces such as the core-mantle boundary, 440 and 670 kilometer discontinuities, and the Earth's surface. Since both the density and the dynamic topography provide approximately the same magnitude of change in the geoid, the resultant geoid is a relatively small value (being the difference between large but similar numbers).

== Examples ==
The geological history of the Colorado Plateau during the last 30 million years has been considerably affected by dynamic topography. At first, between 30 and 15 million years ago, the plateau was greatly uplifted. Then, in a second phase, between 15 and 5 million years ago the plateau was tilted to the east. Finally, in the last 5 million years the western part of the plateau has been tilted to the west. The plateau would have reached its high elevation of 1,400 m.a.s.l. due to dynamic topography. In Patagonia a Miocene transgression has been attributed to a down-dragging effect of mantle convection. A subsequent regression in the Late Miocene and Pliocene and further Quaternary uplift in the eastern coast of Patagonia may in turn have caused a decrease in this convection. The Miocene dynamic topography that developed in Patagonia advanced as a wave from south to north following the northward shift of the Chile Triple Junction and the asthenospheric window associated to it.

== See also ==
- Epeirogenic movement
- Mountain formation
- Orogeny
