= RV Argo =

RV Argo may refer to:

- USS Snatch (ARS-27), more widely known in scientific literature and publicity as RV Argo, was a Diver-class rescue and salvage ship commissioned by the U.S. Navy during World War II. She was assigned to Scripps Institution of Oceanography who converted it in 1960 under Office of Naval Research sponsorship and gave it the name RV Argo under which the ship conducted a decade of important and well publicized work. During that period Snatch was used for administrative purposes by Navy which retained title to the ship. (References at article)
- Argo (ROV), an unmanned deep-towed undersea video camera sled developed by Dr. Robert Ballard through Woods Hole Oceanographic Institute's Deep Submergence Laboratory.
