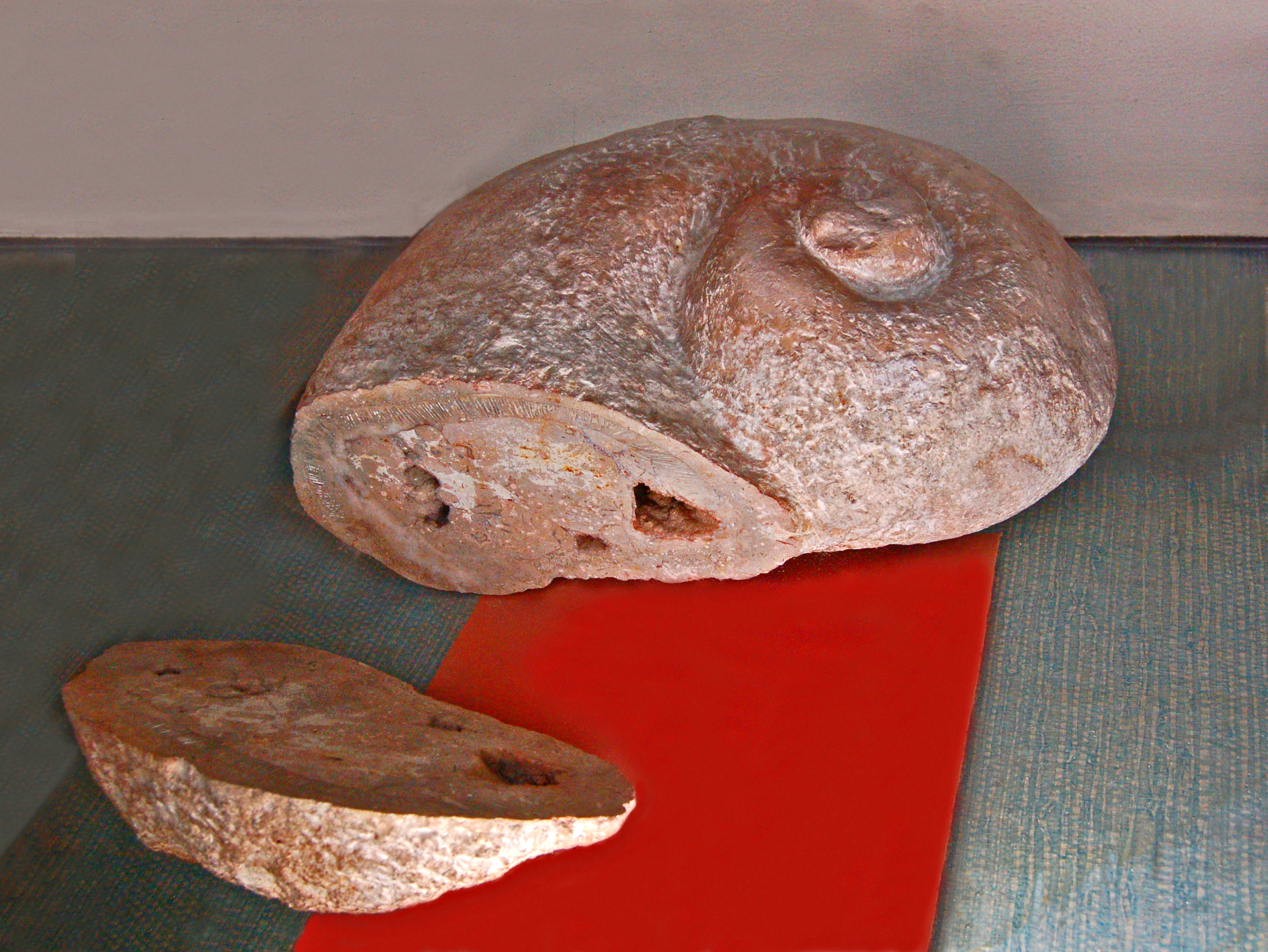
- Fossil shell of Caprina adversa from France, on display at Galerie de paléontologie et d'anatomie comparée in Paris

Scientific classification
- Domain: Eukaryota
- Kingdom: Animalia
- Phylum: Mollusca
- Class: Bivalvia
- Order: †Hippuritida
- Suborder: †Hippuritidina
- Superfamily: †Caprinoidea
- Family: †Caprinidae
- Genus: †Caprina d'Orbigny, 1822

= Caprina =

Caprina Temporal range: Cretaceous, 140.2–70.6 Ma

Extinct genus of bivalves

Caprina is a genus of rudists, a group of marine heterodont bivalves belonging to the family Caprinidae.

These stationary intermediate-level epifaunal suspension feeders lived in the Cretaceous period, from 140.2 to 70.6 Ma. The rudists became extinct at the end of the Cretaceous, apparently as a result of the Cretaceous–Paleogene extinction event.

Fossils of this genus have been found in the sediments of Europe, Japan, Cuba, Mexico and the United States.
