= Titanomagnetite =

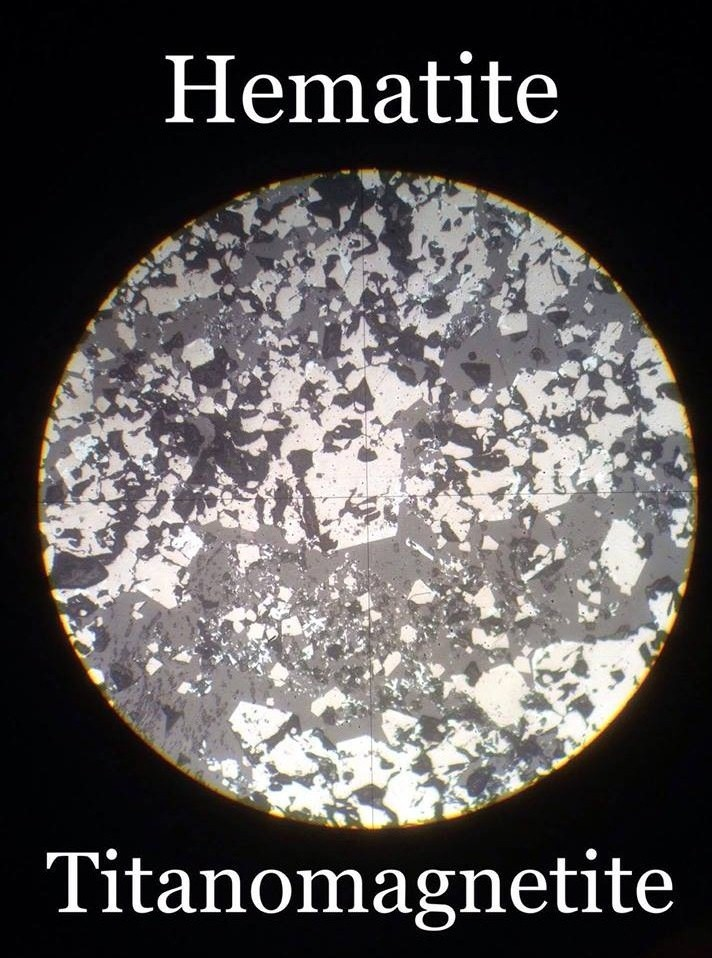
Hematite - titanomagnitite

Titanomagnetite is a mineral containing oxides of titanium and iron, with the formula Fe^{2+}(Fe^{3+},Ti)_{2}O_{4}. It is also known as titaniferous magnetite, mogensenite, Ti-magnetite, or titanian magnetite. It is part of the spinel group of minerals. The Curie temperature for titanomagnetite has been found to have a wide range of 200 to 580°C.

It is can be found in association with zircon, fluorapatite, ferro-ferri-katophrite, ulvöspinel, nepheline, chalcopyrite, phyrrotite, pyrite, natrolite, and chevkinite-(Ce).
