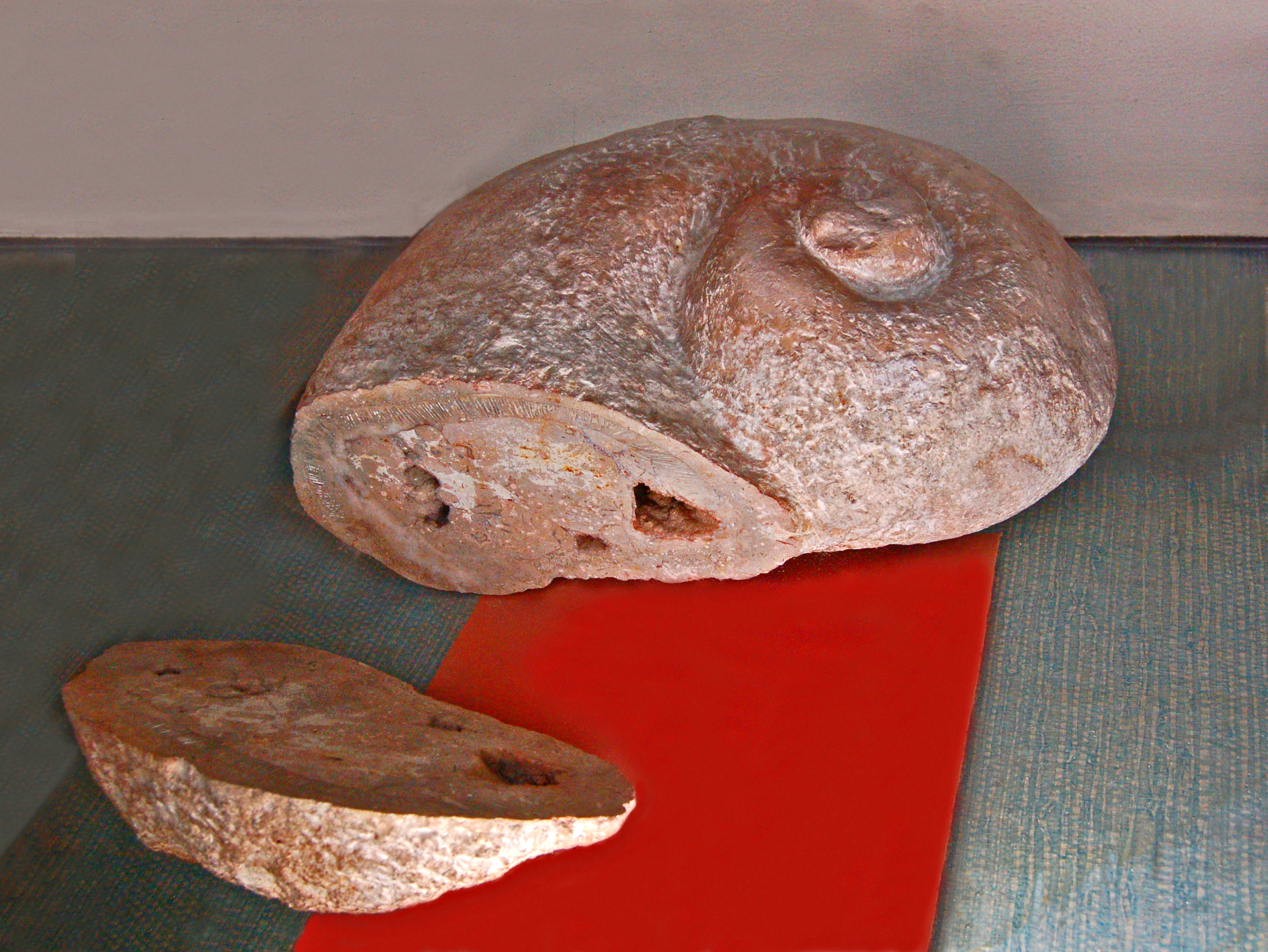
- Fossil shell of Caprina adversa from France, on display at Galerie de paléontologie et d'anatomie comparée in Paris

Scientific classification
- Domain: Eukaryota
- Kingdom: Animalia
- Phylum: Mollusca
- Class: Bivalvia
- Order: †Hippuritida
- Suborder: †Hippuritidina
- Superfamily: †Caprinoidea
- Family: †Caprinidae d'Orbigny, 1850

Genera
- See text.

= Caprinidae =

Caprinidae Temporal range: Cretaceous, 140.2–66.043 Ma

Extinct family of bivalves

Caprinidae is a family of rudists, a group of unusual extinct saltwater clams, marine heterodont bivalves in the order Hippuritida.

These stationary intermediate-level epifaunal suspension feeders lived in the Cretaceous period, from 140.2 to 66.043 Ma. The rudists became extinct at the end of the Cretaceous, apparently as a result of the Cretaceous–Paleogene extinction event.

Fossils of this genus have been found in the sediments of Europe, China, Cuba, Egypt, Guatemala, Jamaica, Japan, Mexico, Oman, the Philippines, Turkey, Russia, the United States and Venezuela.

== Genera ==
- †Antillocaprina
- †Caprina
- †Caprinula
- †Caprinuloidea
- †Coalcomana
- †Conchemipora
- †Guzzyella
- †Huetamia
- †Jalpania
- †Mathesia
- †Mexicaprina
- †Muellerriedia
- †Neocaprina
- †Offneria
- †Orthoptychus
- †Pachytraga
- †Pacificaprina
- †Pantojaloria
- †Texicaprina
