= Thermal subsidence =

Geological phenomenon

In geology and geophysics, thermal subsidence is a mechanism of subsidence in which conductive cooling of the mantle thickens the lithosphere and causes it to decrease in elevation. This is because of thermal expansion: as mantle material cools and becomes part of the mechanically rigid lithosphere, it becomes denser than the surrounding material. Additional material added to the lithosphere thickens it and further causes a buoyant decrease in the elevation of the lithosphere. This creates accommodation space into which sediments can deposit, forming a sedimentary basin.

== Causes ==
Thermal subsidence can occur anywhere in which a temperature differential exists between a section of the lithosphere and its surroundings. There are a variety of contributing factors that can initiate thermal subsidence or affect the process as it is ongoing.

== Delamination ==
As endogenous and exogenous processes cause denudation of the earth's surface, lower, warmer sections of the lithosphere are exposed to relative differences in weight and density. This relative difference creates buoyancy. Isostatic uplift can then further expose the lithosphere to conductive cooling, causing a “rise and fall” phenomenon as warmer, less dense rock layers are pushed or buoyed up, then cooled, causing it to contract and sink back down.

== Conduction ==
The conditions to create thermal subsidence can be initiated by various forms of uplift and denudation, but the actual process of thermal subsidence is governed by the loss of heat via thermal conduction. Contact with surrounding rock or the surface causes heat to leach out of a section of the lithosphere. As the lithosphere cools, it causes the rock to contract.

== Isostasy ==
When conduction causes a section of the lithosphere to contract and increase in density, it does not directly add mass to the rock. Instead, it causes the volume to decrease, increasing the mass of the section for a given area. The lithosphere is isostatic with the mantle; its weight is supported by the relative density of the surrounding rock. When a section cools and its density increases, it sinks, causing the relative elevation to decrease. This can create a basin in which sediments are deposited, which adds weight on top of the sinking section of the lithosphere and increase the total mass of the section per unit area, causing it to sink further.

== Effects ==
Thermal subsidence can have an effect on island formation. Isostatic uplift can be balanced with thermal subsidence in response to erosion on islands without barrier reefs, which sink only when subjected to wave erosion. However, volcanic islands and seamounts with barrier reefs are shielded from wave and stream erosion, and thus the countervailing isostatic uplift is eliminated, causing them to subside and create an atoll.

== Metamorphism ==
Thermal subsidence can drive metamorphism in rocks. The conduction of heat out of a section of lithosphere causes the rock to thicken and become more insulated to heat flowing in from the mantle; as this thicker section is buried by the descending column of the lithosphere, it descends into surrounding rock layers with a higher relative geothermal gradient. This gradient can cause metamorphism in rocks, as seen in South Australia.

== Eustasy ==
Eustasy refers to a change in the relative sea level. It can have effects on the thermal subsidence during the formation of geological features such as mountain ranges. Sea level often changes in response to the formation of glaciers on land; the weight of these glaciers or the absence thereof can influence the overall rate of thermal subsidence.

== Petroleum formation ==
As the lithosphere cools and subsides, a sedimentary basin can be formed on top of the subsiding mass. The characteristics of the basement sediments can produce conditions conducive to the conversion of kerogen into petroleum. The gigantic Wilmington Oil Field in the Los Angeles basin was formed as a result of this process.
