= Kapenga Caldera =

Volcanic caldera in New Zealand

- Kapenda Volcanic Centre
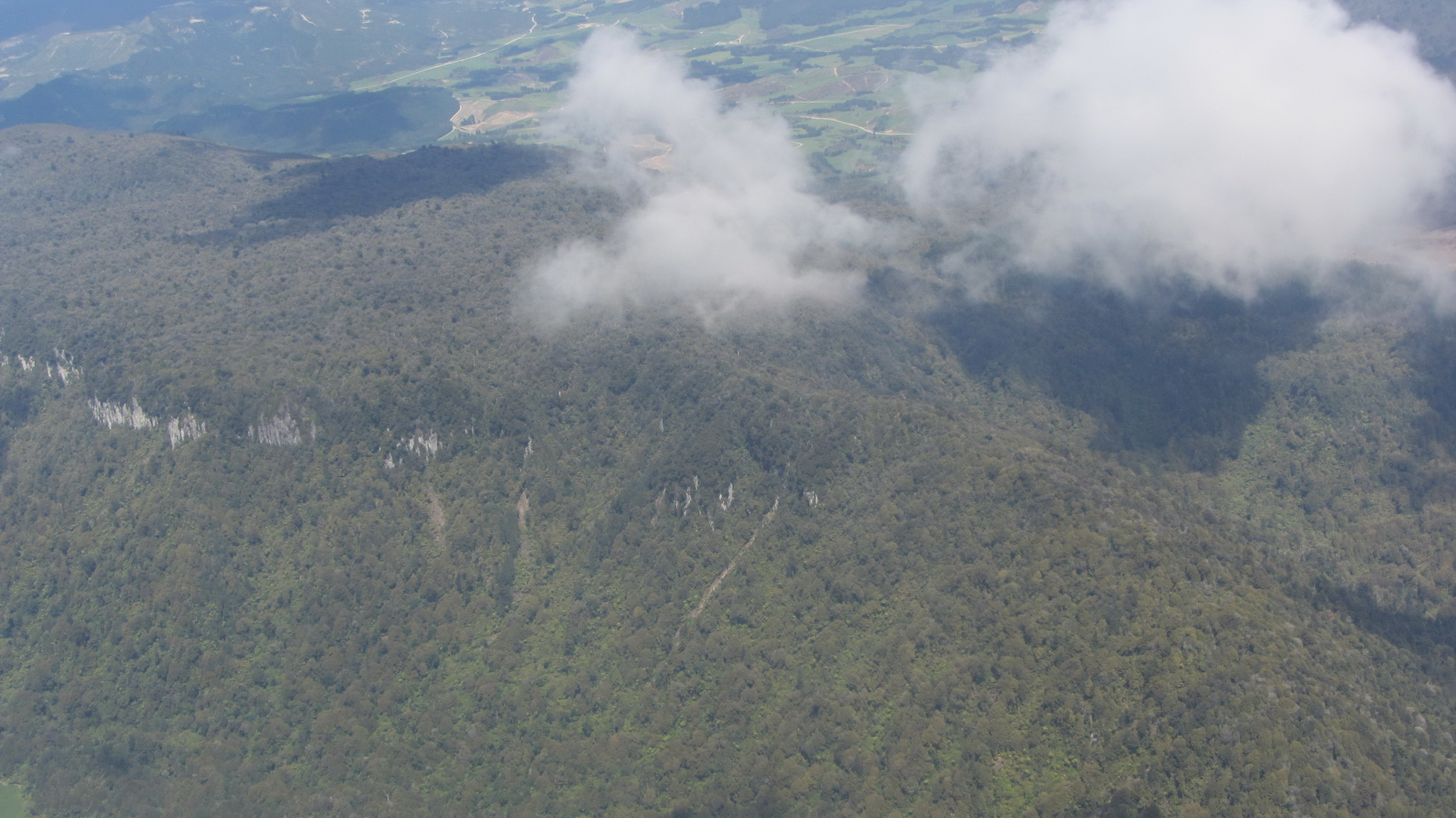
- Horohoro Cliffs at the southwestern edge of the caldera (view is towards the west from the air above the caldera).

Highest point
- Elevation: 817 m (2,680 ft)
- Coordinates: 38°16′S 176°16′E

Geography
- Location within New Zealand Location within North Island

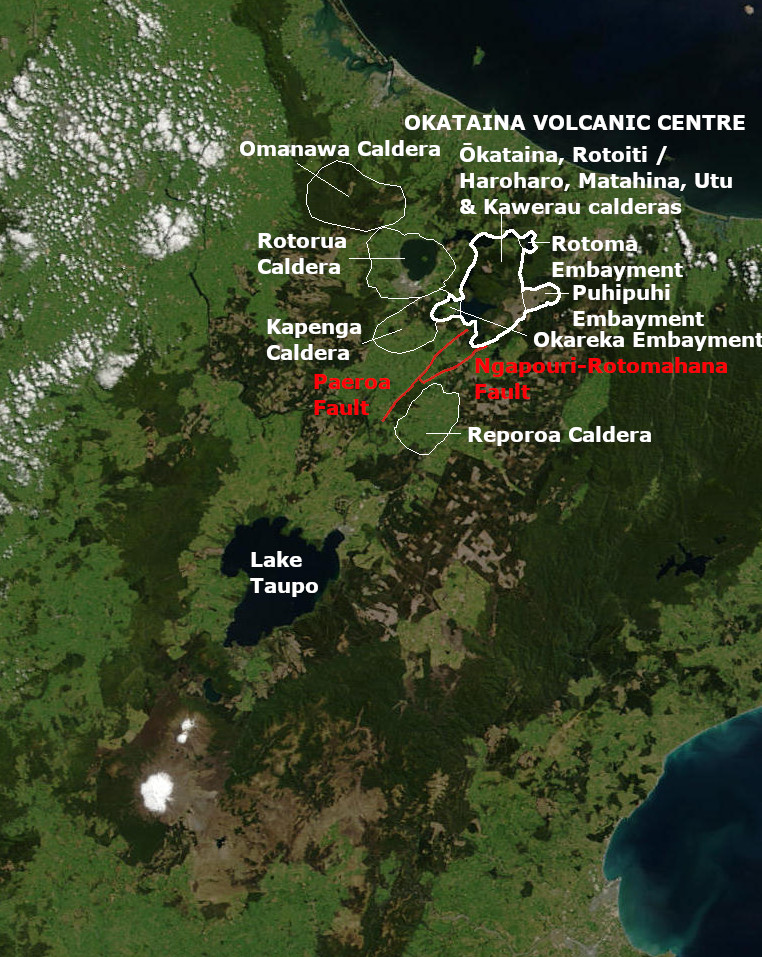
- The Kapenga Caldera is located south of the Rotorua Caldera and southeast of the Ōkataina Caldera (thick white border). The relationships to other nearby volcanic and tectonic structures are also shown.
- Location: North Island
- Country: New Zealand
- Region: Waikato

Geology
- Rock age: Approximately 890,000 years
- Mountain type: Caldera
- Volcanic zone: Taupō Volcanic Zone
- Last eruption: 275,000 ± 10,000 years ago

Climbing
- Access: State Highway 5 (New Zealand)
- Map centered to show selected surface volcanic deposits in the area of the postulated Kapenga Caldera/Volcanic Centre (light green shading). The markers are of the highest peaks mentioned in the page text. The present surface ignimbrite is various light violet shades, which are identical for any single source, but other eruptions may break up the mutual ignimbrite sheets. Legend: Key for the volcanics that are shown with panning is: basalt (shades of brown/orange); monogenetic basalts; undifferentiated basalts of the Tangihua Complex in Northland Allochthon; arc basalts; arc ring basalts; dacite; andesite (shades of red); basaltic andesite; rhyolite (ignimbrite is lighter shades of violet); plutonic; White shading is selected caldera features.; Clicking on the rectangle icon enables full window and mouse-over with volcano name/wikilink and ages before present.

The Kapenga Caldera (also known as the Kapenda Volcanic Centre) in New Zealand's Taupō Volcanic Zone lies in a lowland area immediately south of Lake Rotorua through the Hemo Gap in the Rotorua Caldera rim. Features of the caldera have developed over a period of about 900,000 years. At some time more than 60,000 years ago, Lake Rotorua drained through the Hemo Gap, and part of the Kapenga Caldera floor was likely occupied by a lake, which has been referred to as Kapenga.

== Geography ==
The Kapenga Caldera has a western boundary defined by the Horohoro Cliffs and an eastern boundary marked by volcanic domes, including those in the Ōkareka Embayment, some of which are buried by the younger activity of the Ōkataina Volcanic Centre. The Horohoro Cliffs rise to 817 m (2,680 ft) in what is a mountain range, (Note: The Horohoro Cliffs range contains at its southern end a peak called Horohoro with the full Māori name of Te Horohoroinga-o-ngā-ringa-o-Kahumatamomoe which means the "Washing of Kahumatamomoe's hands".) and the caldera contains Haparangi a volcanic dome that is 668 m (2,192 ft) high. Its southern boundary of volcanic activity is ill-defined but does not extend into areas of continuing low residual gravity anomaly in the Paeroa Graben.

=== Geology ===
The Kapenga Caldera, located just south of the Rotorua Caldera and between it and the Maroa Caldera, is believed to have been buried by subsequent eruptions, including those of the Tarawera volcanic complex which is one factor in making it difficult to define its boundaries. The eastern area of the postulated caldera has experienced, relative to much of the rest of the central Taupō Volcanic Zone, many smaller eruptions after caldera formation. Unfortunately, to date, no definite assignment of the up to seven ignimbrites attributed to it can be related to a specific caldera-forming event or documented collapse, despite geological evidence suggesting that such an event may have occurred. The caldera had several very large eruptive events during the ignimbrite flare-up of the Taupō Volcanic Zone, between 350,000 and 240,000 years ago. The boundary between the Kapenga Caldera and the Ōkataina Caldera is debated, which particularly affects more recent Earthquake Flat activity. The Kapenga Caldera occupies the northern part of the Paeroa Graben, between the uplift caused by the now fairly inactive Horohoro Fault and the uplift associated with the still very active Paeroa Fault. It has been speculated that the Horohoro Cliffs represent the edge of the caldera. (Note: Whether the Horohoro Cliffs are the edge of the caldera has not yet been resolved. A recent literature review maps in the same figure two western potential borders for the caldera, one of which is along Haparangi and the other along the Horohoro Cliffs. While both of the rhyolite bases erupted during the ignimbrite flare-up between 350,000 and 240,000 years ago, the Horohoro Cliffs are noted to have R1 + 2 magmatism more like eruptives from the Ōkataina Caldera than the composition of the ignimbrites erupted from the Kapenga Caldera at the same time. A cross section of the Kapenga Caldera in the same paper shows the Horohoro Cliffs and their rhyolite as at the edge of the caldera, but without a magma pocket assigned to the caldera.) To the south of the caldera is the Ngakuru Graben. For an unknown period between the Mamaku Ignimbrite eruption of the Rotorua Caldera 240,000 years ago and about 60,000 years ago, Lake Rotorua drained via the Hemo Gorge into the Kapenga Caldera, which likely contained a lake, and through the Ngakuru Graben, onwards to the Waikato River as it existed then. Subsequent volcanic activity has buried much of the evidence of this phase in the caldera's history.

A large number of intra-rift faults called the Taupō Fault Belt are associated with the modern Taupō Rift, and they exist in the Paeroa Graben and Kapenga Caldera, making it a tectonically active area.

The paired, in time, Rotoiti eruption and Earthquake Flat Breccia eruptions had the latter initially assigned to the Kapenga Caldera, as it was within the old caldera's margins. However, some have assigned it to the magma mush body underlying the magma bodies of the Ōkataina Volcanic Centre, suggesting it belongs to a different volcanic centre. An attempt to address the controversy of which caldera was responsible for the Earthquake Flat eruption was made in 2001 by DA Bowyer, with the difficulties noted. Often, such issues can be resolved by compositional analysis. Bowyer noted that the Earthquake Flat eruptives were distinct from the earlier Chimp eruptives. While more compositional analysis exists, the issue is unresolved. (Note: An attempt to address the controversy of which caldera was responsible for the Earthquake Flat eruption was made in 2001 by DA Bowyer, with the difficulties noted in the articles text. Often, such issues can be resolved by compositional analysis. Bowyer noted that the Earthquake Flat eruptives were distinct from the earlier Chimp eruptives. Much of the compositional analysis that may help resolve this issue appears to be in the public domain and was last compiled by H. Elms using her own data on two Rotoiti samples and Earthquake Flat from BLA Charlier. Elms says "The Earthquake Flat magma was erupted from the adjacent Kāpenga caldera and was magmatically separate from the Rotoiti magmas." However, she notes the similarity in composition of the Rotoiti and Earthquake Flat eruptives compared to other recent Ōkataina eruptives. This similarity in composition would also appear to be consistent with models proposed by others, where the Earthquake Flat eruptives shared common deep magma sources that underlie the known shallower mush pockets of the Ōkataina Caldera. The issue is unresolved as no peer reviewed secondary source analysing the multiple primary sources independently could be identified. One point not apparently considered by those involved in the controversy is that it is theoretically possible, by fault interaction, that magma bodies of both the Ōkataina and Kapenga Volcanic Centres may have combined in the past. It is known that a magma reservoir located under one volcanic system can erupt tens of kilometers away.)

==== Eruptions ====
Its known eruptions were:

- 890,000 - 680,000 years ago
  - Tikorangi Ignimbrite (sometimes known as Pukerimu Ignimbrite). Erupted at 0.89 ± 0.04 Ma
  - Rahopaka Ignimbrite (0.77 ± 0.03 Ma)
  - Waiotapu Ignimbrite (0.71 ± 0.06 Ma)
  - Matahana Ignimbrite (0.68 ± 0.04 Ma)
- 310,000 - 275,000 years ago
  - The caldera is not a source of some of the Mamaku ignimbrite as previously speculated. This material originates from the Rotorua Caldera.
  - Neither is the caldera the source of the Ohakuri Ignimbrite as previously speculated. This material originates from the Ohakuri Caldera.
  - Pokai Ignimbrite (0.275 ± 0.01 Ma) (previously assigned 0.23 - 0.22 Ma)
    - Eruptive volume: 100 cubic kilometres (24 cu mi)
    - The welded hard deposit almost reached Tokoroa to the west and about Tauriko in the northeast.
    - The vent remains uncertain and may be located in the Ōkataina Caldera.
  - Waihou (Chimp, Chimpanzee) Ignimbrite (0.31 ± 0.1 on stratigraphic grounds) (previously assigned 0.26 - 0.25 Ma)
    - Eruptive volume: 50 cubic kilometres (12 cu mi)
    - The loose unwelded deposit reached Tauranga in the northeast and almost to Tokoroa in the west.
    - The vent remains uncertain and may be located in the Ōkataina Caldera.
- (controversial) about 50,000 years ago (Earthquake Flat Breccia)
