= Horohoro Fault =

Geologic fault in New Zealand

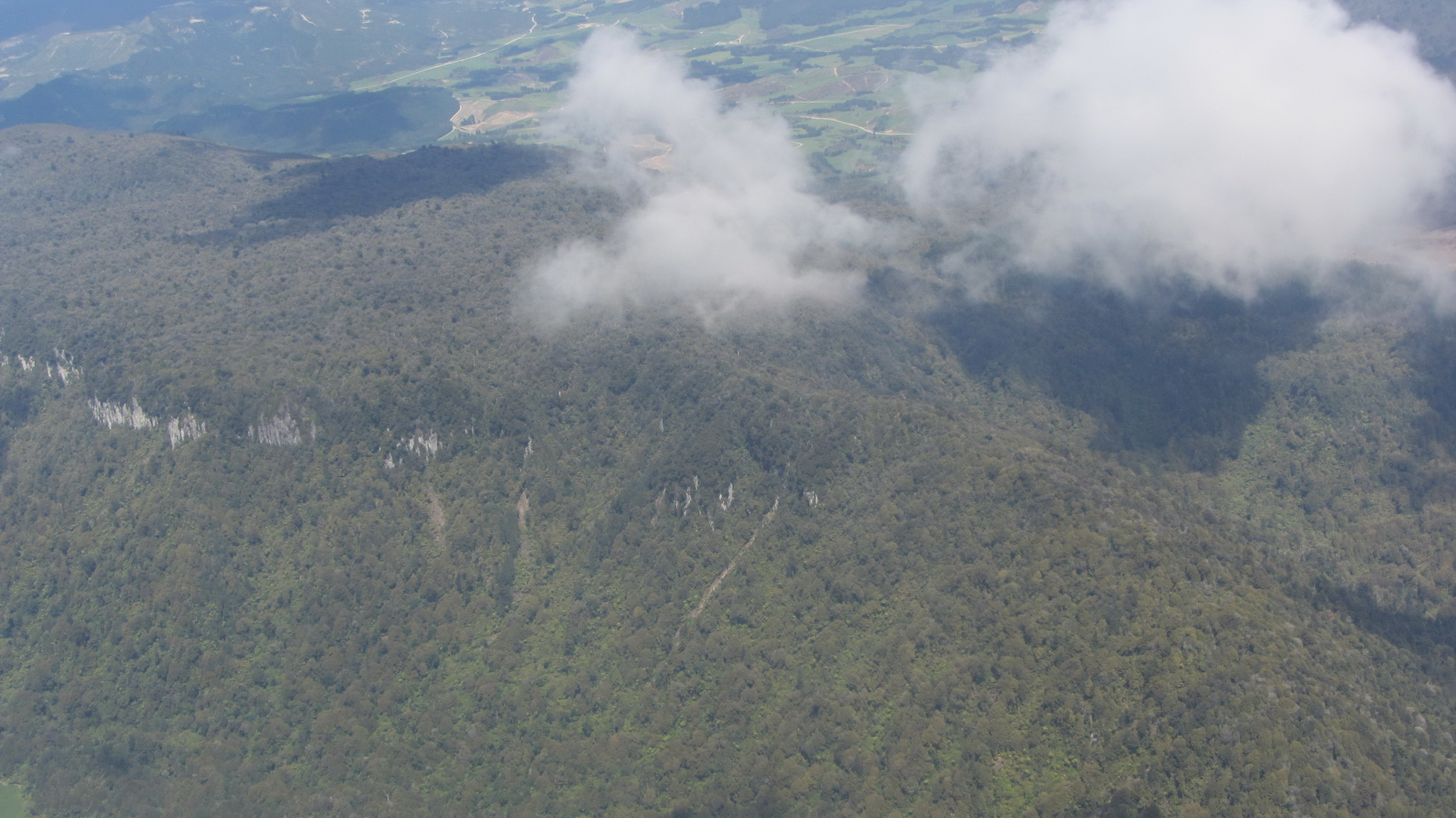
- Horohoro Cliffs formed by the fault (view is from the air towards the west above south western edge of the Kapenga Caldera).

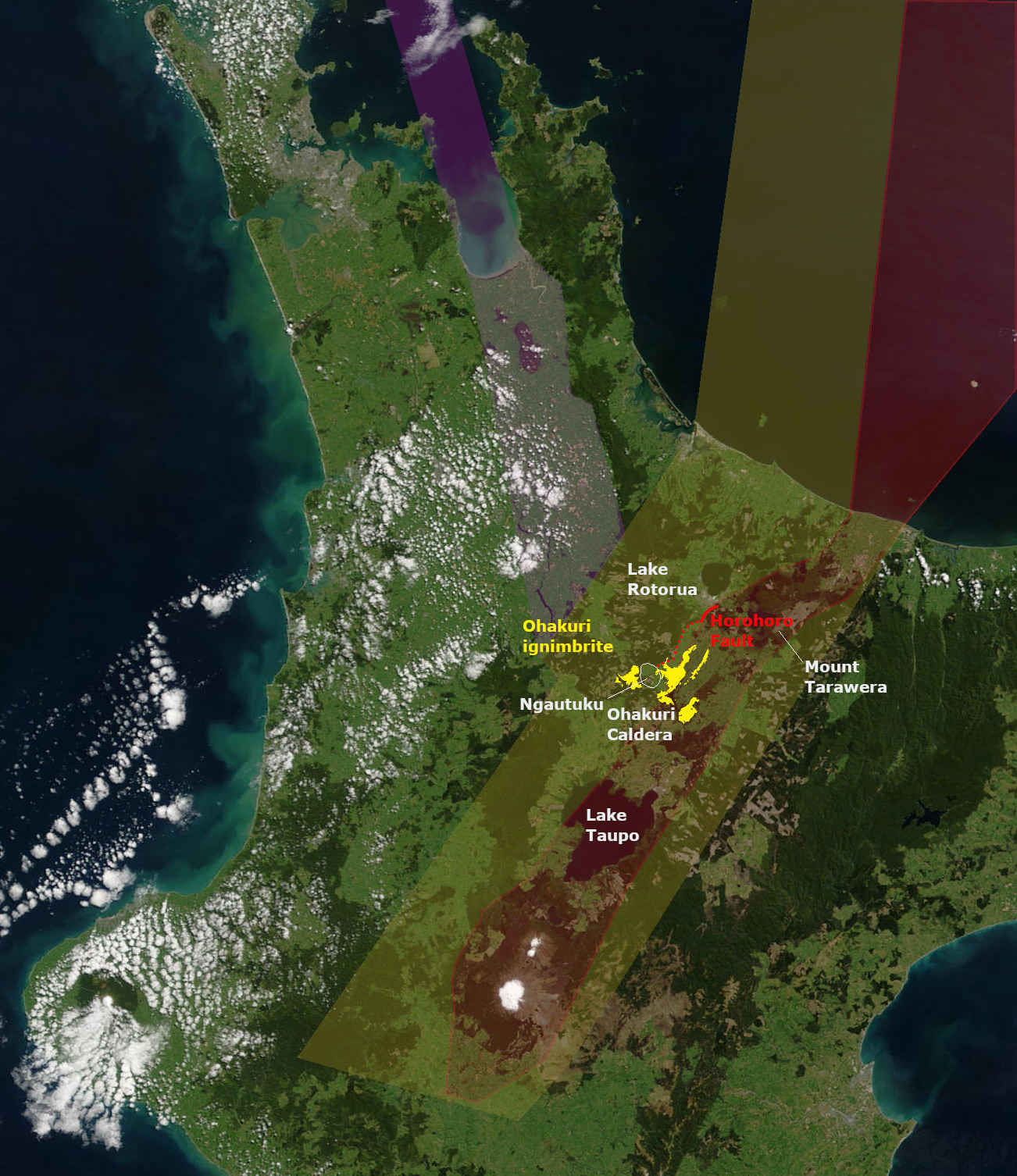
- The inactive southern portion (red dots) and active northern portion (red line) of the Horohoro Fault in the old Taupō Rift (light yellow shading), North Island, New Zealand. Other relevant geology is shown to reflect the controversy relating to the fault. The possible outline in white of the Ohakuri Caldera at the southern end with surrounding Ohakuri ignimbrite (yellow) is shown. The modern Taupō Rift (light red shading) and Hauraki Rift (light purple shading) are shown for context. Landmarks such as Lake Taupō, Lake Rotorua, Mount Tarawera are shown for orientation. The dome Ngautuku is identified for reasons not associated with the fault.
- Etymology: Māori: Te Horohoroinga-o-ngā-ringa-o-Kahumatamomoe
- Coordinates: 38°14′0″S 176°10′0″E
- Country: New Zealand
- Region: Waikato Region

Characteristics
- Range: Up to 6.5 Mw
- Segments: 2
- Length: 20 km (12 mi)
- Displacement: Northern Horohoro Fault 0.14 mm (0.0055 in)/yr to 0.2 mm (0.0079 in)/yr

Tectonics
- Plate: Indo-Australian
- Status: Active
- Type: Normal fault
- Age: Miocene-Holocene
- Volcanic arc/belt: Taupō Volcanic Zone
- New Zealand geology database (includes faults)

The Horohoro Fault is in the old Taupō Rift of the central North Island of New Zealand and is associated with the spectacular Horohoro Cliffs.

== Geology ==
Just south of Lake Rotorua, Horohoro mountain, a rhyolite dome, has very high cliffs in an apparent fault scarp that defines the western edge of the lower lying Paeroa Garben and its northern Kapenga Caldera. The Paeroa Garben's eastern edge is defined by the Paeroa Fault. The cliffs are composed of Mamaku ignimbrite from the Rotorua Caldera eruption and older ignimbrites and Rotorua rhyolite. This fault area of the Taupō Rift is controversial as the components of historic tectonic and volcanic contribution have led to debate. Some authors have also extended and widened the definition of the Ngakuru Graben, which is to the south, during this debate. The northern portion of the fault for the last 20,000 years is displacing at a low rate of up to 0.2 mm/yr but it is unknown if the southern portion is active. The far northern portion passes through the Hemo Gorge which may have been created by a flood event soon after the creation of the Rotorua caldera, with only later drainage of the caldera being established towards the Bay of Plenty. What is known is that the fault has displaced historically at a much higher rate before the last Taupō Hatepe eruption. It has been speculated that just after the paired Rotorua Caldera and Ohakuri Caldera eruptive sequences of 240,000 years ago when the magma mush had been erupted the garben sunk by over 250 metres (820 ft). It has also been speculated that the modern Taupō Rifts far west edge is actually this fault line although most think this is more to the east, along the line of the Paeroa Fault. It has also been speculated that the northern part of the fault is actually the western edge of the Kapenga Caldera with the Horohoro dome in its rim.

== Risks ==
This intra-rift fault has been estimated to have single event earthquakes in its northern portion up to about 6.5 Mw every 5000 to 7000 years. The time of the last fault rupture was after 8000 years ago but before the Hatepe eruption.
