= Whangamata fault zone =

Fault in New Zealand

- Whangamata Fault, Haukari/West Whangamata Fault
- Map of Whangamata fault zone (active faults in red). Clicking on the map enables mouse over of active faults details.
- Etymology: Whangamata Bay, Lake Taupō
- Coordinates: 38.588°S 175.962°E
- Country: New Zealand
- Region: Waikato Region

Tectonics
- Plate: Indo-Australian
- Status: Active
- Earthquakes: June - July 1922, 2001
- Type: Normal fault
- Movement: 5 M_{W}+ in 1922 with 1.8 m (5 ft 11 in) displacement
- Age: Quaternary
- Volcanic arc/belt: Taupō Volcanic Zone
- New Zealand geology database (includes faults)

The Whangamata fault zone is part of the seismically active western Taupō rift-bounding normal wall faults and is associated with the major active Whangamata Fault and Haukari/West Whangamata Fault and several unnamed active faults. Obsidian used by the Māori is exposed along these faults.

== Geography ==
The known active faults in the zone extend north east from Kinloch on the north west shore of Lake Taupō approximately 20 km (12 mi) through the rhyolytic volcanic dome of Ben Lomond to the region of the Mokai Power Station.

=== Geology ===
The present western wall faults of the Taupō Fault Belt in this region of active extension by 8 mm (0.31 in)/year ± 2 mm (0.079 in) of the modern Taupō Volcanic Zone have been defined by earthquake swarms such as occurred in 1922 which resulted in a 1.8 m (5 ft 11 in) displacement of the Whangamata Fault and the swarm of 2001. To the north the zone continues as the Thorpe - Poplar Fault and to the south has its structure disturbed and hidden by the Taupō Volcano. The 2001 earthquake swarm is best explained by intrusion into a volcanic dyke.

== Risks ==
These are typical for a fault structure adjacent to an active volcanic caldera filled with a lake, being both tectonic and any associated volcanism and so could be significant. The 1922 earthquake swarm was associated with several earthquakes in the range of 5 to 5.4 M_{W} which caused chimney collapse, land slips, as well as both local and international concern sufficient to impact the tourist industry given the manifest lake shore subsidence and fault displacements. The swarm lasted nine months with total displacement of up to 3 metres (9.8 ft) on the northern shore of Lake Taupō (not just the Whangamata fault zone was involved). As the magma-tectonic interaction of the 2001 swarm may have been from a magma source independent of the Taupō Volcano, relatively small scale eruption associated with the faults would be possible, if a dyke reaches the surface.

== Mineral Resources ==
The extensive and used obsidian outcrops near Kinloch were accessible to the Māori as they were exposed by the Whangamata Fault.
