= Ohakuri Caldera =

Volcanic caldera in New Zealand

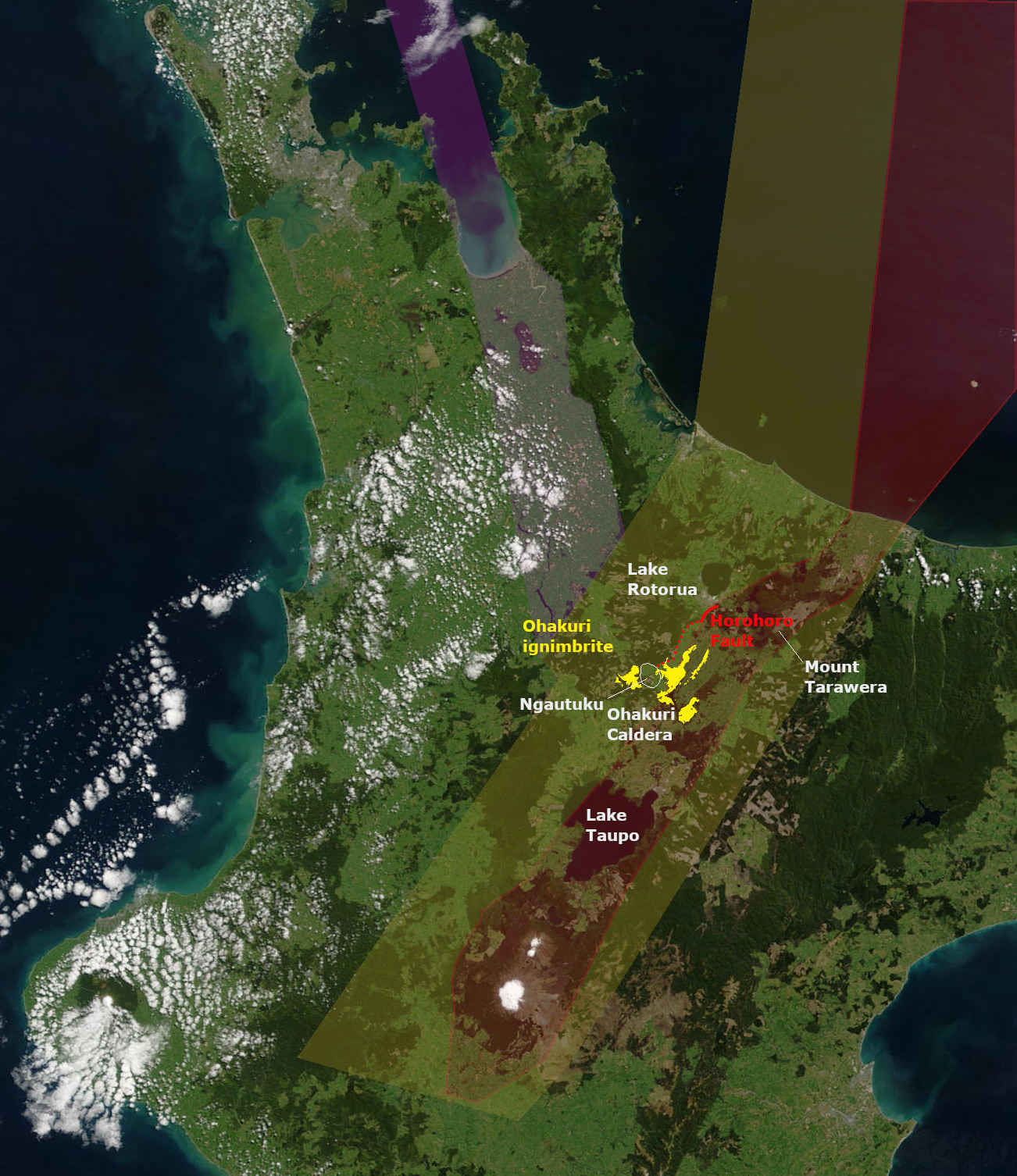
- Approximate location and outline (white) of Ohakuri Caldera. Known surrounding Ohakuri ignimbrite (yellow) is approximately as shown. The relationship to the inactive southern portion (red dots) and active northern portion (red line) of the Horohoro Fault may be important. The old Taupō Rift (light yellow shading), modern Taupō Rift (light red shading) and Hauraki Rift (light purple shading) are shown for context. Landmarks such as Lake Taupō, Lake Rotorua, Mount Tarawera are shown for orientation. Within the caldera the dome Ngautuku is identified.

Highest point
- Elevation: 629 m (2,064 ft)
- Prominence: Ngautuku
- Coordinates: 38°22′41″S 176°01′08″E

Dimensions
- Width: 5 km (3.1 mi)

Geography
- Location within North Island
- Location: North Island
- Country: New Zealand
- Region: Waikato
- Range coordinates: 38°21′53″S 176°02′05″E

Geology
- Rock age: Pleistocene (0.24 Ma)
- Mountain type: Caldera
- Volcanic zone: Taupō Volcanic Zone
- Last eruption: 240,000 years ago

Climbing
- Access: State Highway 1 (New Zealand)

The Ohakuri Caldera (also spelled with a macron; Ōhakuri Caldera) was formed in a paired single event eruption of Ohakuri ignimbrite and is located in the Taupō Volcanic Zone on the North Island of New Zealand. Its significance was first recognised in 2004, as the geology of the area had been misunderstood until then. The paired eruption resulted in a very large eruption sequence in the Taupō Volcanic Zone about 240,000 years ago that included the formation of Lake Rotorua and eruption of the Mamaku ignimbrite.

== Geography ==
The Ohakuri Caldera lies mainly to the east and north of the Ātiamuri Dam and extends almost to the Ōhakuri Dam. Its borders are ill-defined, particularly the northern and eastern borders, possibly because later volcanotectonic activity has completely replaced landforms that could have at one stage included a lake extending almost from Lake Rotorua to this caldera. Its western border is believed to be defined by the valley of the Mangaharakeke stream that the main highway uses and towards the north west of Ātiamuri the caldera floor extends at just below the 300 metres (980 ft) level above sea level. Ngautuku is a dome at the south western aspect of the caldera. The much larger Maroa Caldera complex is to the south with its northern border on the Waikato River so the two caldera borders are adjacent. However, the older Whakamaru Caldera almost certainly crosses the present river course and overlaps the Ohakuri Caldera to a degree. The Waikato River course follows roughly the borders of these two caldera but the thermal area of Orakei Korako to the east is likely more related to the Maroa Caldera.

=== Geology ===
There is evidence of local volcanic activity before 240,000 years ago and not all might have been due to events in the adjacent Maroa Caldera. Possibly Pokai ignimbrite which is found to the east on the faultline of the Paeroa Fault, actually came from a caldera eruption that may have been co-located with the present Ohakuri Caldera about 275,000 years ago, but this is speculation. Ohakuri ignimbrite, which has been characterised as a deposit radiating in decreasing thickness from the Ātiamuri area arises from the most significant eruption of the Caldera. This ignimbrite deposit has been reported to extend to about 15 km (9.3 mi) to the north and east. To the north east there is definite presence 17 km (11 mi) away.

==== 240,000 years ago Ohakuri paired eruption ====
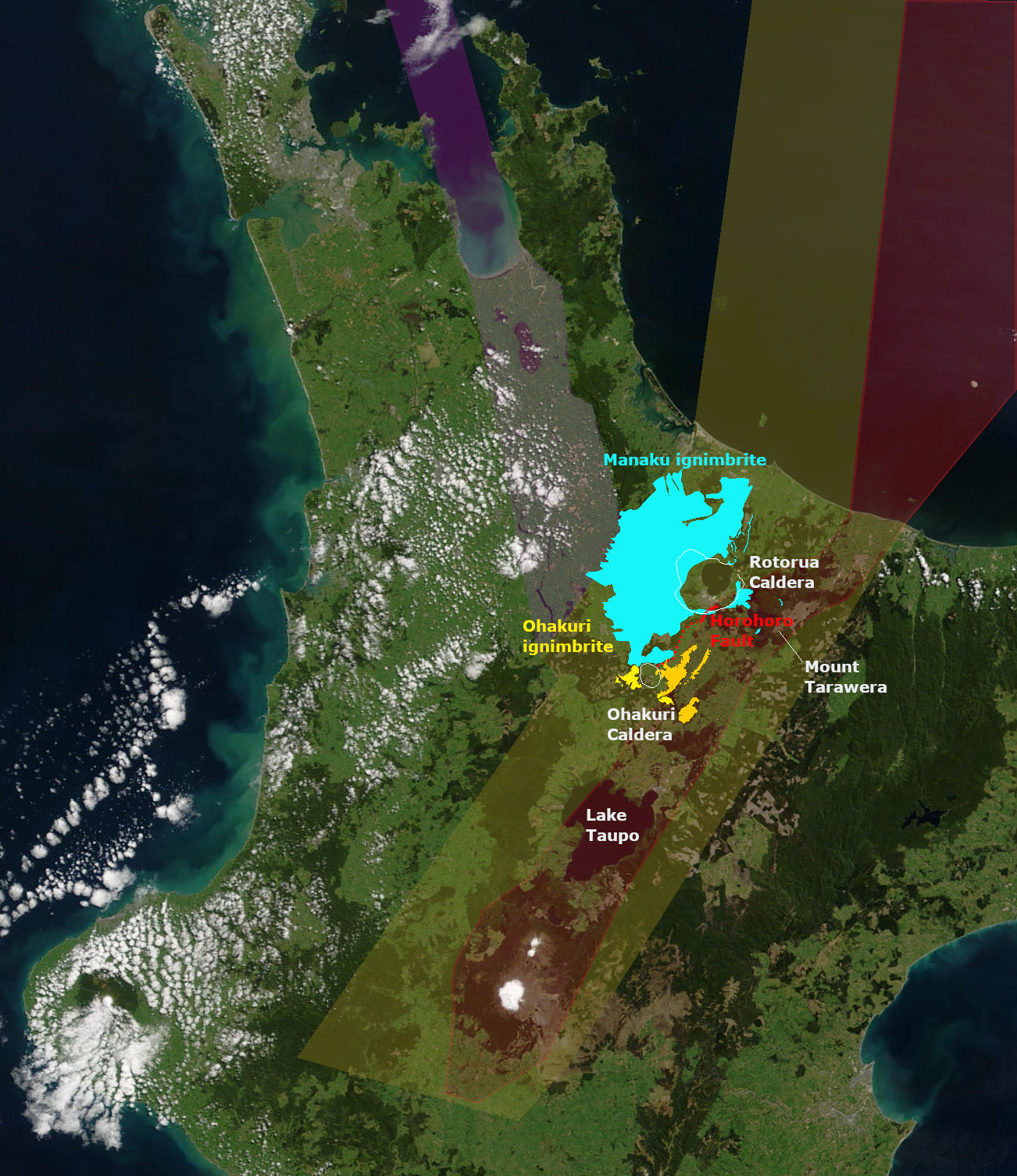
Key is as with other image on the page with addition of surrounding Mamaku (blue) and separate phases of Ohakuri ignimbrites (yellow phase 1 and dark yellow phase 2).

There is now good evidence that the 240,000 years ago the Ohakuri ignimbrite eruption was a paired eruption within days/weeks of the very slightly earlier, slightly larger, northerly eruption from the same mush body feeding the Rotorua Caldera. Ignimbrite, up to 180 metres (590 ft) thick was deposited in the surrounding area to the south of Rotorua.

Between Rotorua and Ohakuri crosssections of the ash and ignimbrite from the two eruptions have been able to be sequenced completely and have relationships that can only be explained by a sequence of eruptions separated on occasions by days or less (e.g. no rainfall between eruptions). Further geomagnetic excursion studies appear to constrain the entire sequence of twin eruptions to a period of decades or at most centuries. The pairing separated by 30 kilometres (19 mi) was possibly through tectonic coupling of separate magma bodies that co-evolved from a lower in the mantle common mush body, as paired events are being increasingly recognised. The maximum outflow dense-rock equivalent (DRE) of the Ohakuri ignimbrite is 100 cubic kilometres (24 mi^{3}) which means the combined eruptions produced 245 cubic kilometres (59 cu mi) of material.

240 ka Ohakuri eruption sequence
Unit	Source Caldera	Thickness at Ohakura	Comment
-	Ohakuri	10 cm (3.9 in)	Precursor’ airfall ash overlaid by some soil
1	Ohakuri	<10 cm (3.9 in)	Airfall deposit - no significant time break beyond weeks or a few months.
2	Ohakuri	about 30 cm (12 in)	Linian pumice-fall deposit that is observed below and above the thick Mamaku ignimbrite (unit 4) from Rotorua caldera so is simultaneous to the Mamaku eruption.
4	Rotorua	5 m (16 ft)	Mamaku ignimbrite
2	Ohakuri	about 30 cm (12 in)	Linian pumice-fall deposit that is observed below and above the thick Mamaku ignimbrite (unit 4) from Rotorua caldera so is simultaneous to the Mamaku eruption.
5	Rotorua	up to 50 cm (20 in)	Fine-grained ash deposit from the Mamaku eruption, time-break of possibly days to weeks.
6	Ohakuri	up to 100 m (330 ft)	Ohakuri ignimbrite.

It has been postulated that the drainage of the linked deep magma mush body between Rotorua and Ohakuri resulted in more than 250 metres (820 ft) of vertical displacement on the Horohoro Fault scarp and formed the Paeroa Graben, coincident to the north with the Kapenga Caldera between it and the Paeroa Fault to the east. This is an area known as the Horohoro Cliffs escarpment and displaced Mamaku ignimbrite from the Rotorua Caldera eruption by this amount, presumably shortly after the eruption. This fault, in the present day, while active has a much lower displacement rate of the order of 0.14 millimetres (0.0055 in)/year and has been assigned by some as the outer western fault of the modern Taupō Rift although most think this is further to the east. Understanding that there is volcanotectonic interrelationship lead to a complete reinterpretation of events in the Taupō Volcanic Zone in the last 250,000 years.

Map centered between the Ohakuri caldera and Rotorua caldera (both light green shading) so as to show selected surface volcanic deposits including all the present surface Mamaku and Ohakuri ignimbrites. Legend: Key for the volcanics that are shown with panning is: basalt (shades of brown/orange); monogenetic basalts; undifferentiated basalts of the Tangihua Complex in Northland Allochthon; arc basalts; arc ring basalts; dacite; andesite (shades of red); basaltic andesite; rhyolite (ignimbrite is lighter shades of violet); plutonic; White shading is selected caldera features.; Clicking on the rectangle icon enables full window and mouse-over with volcano name/wikilink and ages before present.

==== Subsequent mineral potential ====
There has been interest in the mineral potential close to the western rim of the caldera.

== See also ==
- Geology of New Zealand
- Geothermal areas in New Zealand
- Geothermal power in New Zealand
- List of volcanoes in New Zealand
- North Island Volcanic Plateau – Pyroclastic volcanic plateau on the North Island of New Zealand
- Taupō Volcanic Zone
- Taupō Volcano
- Volcanology of New Zealand
