= Maroa Caldera =

Volcanic caldera in New Zealand

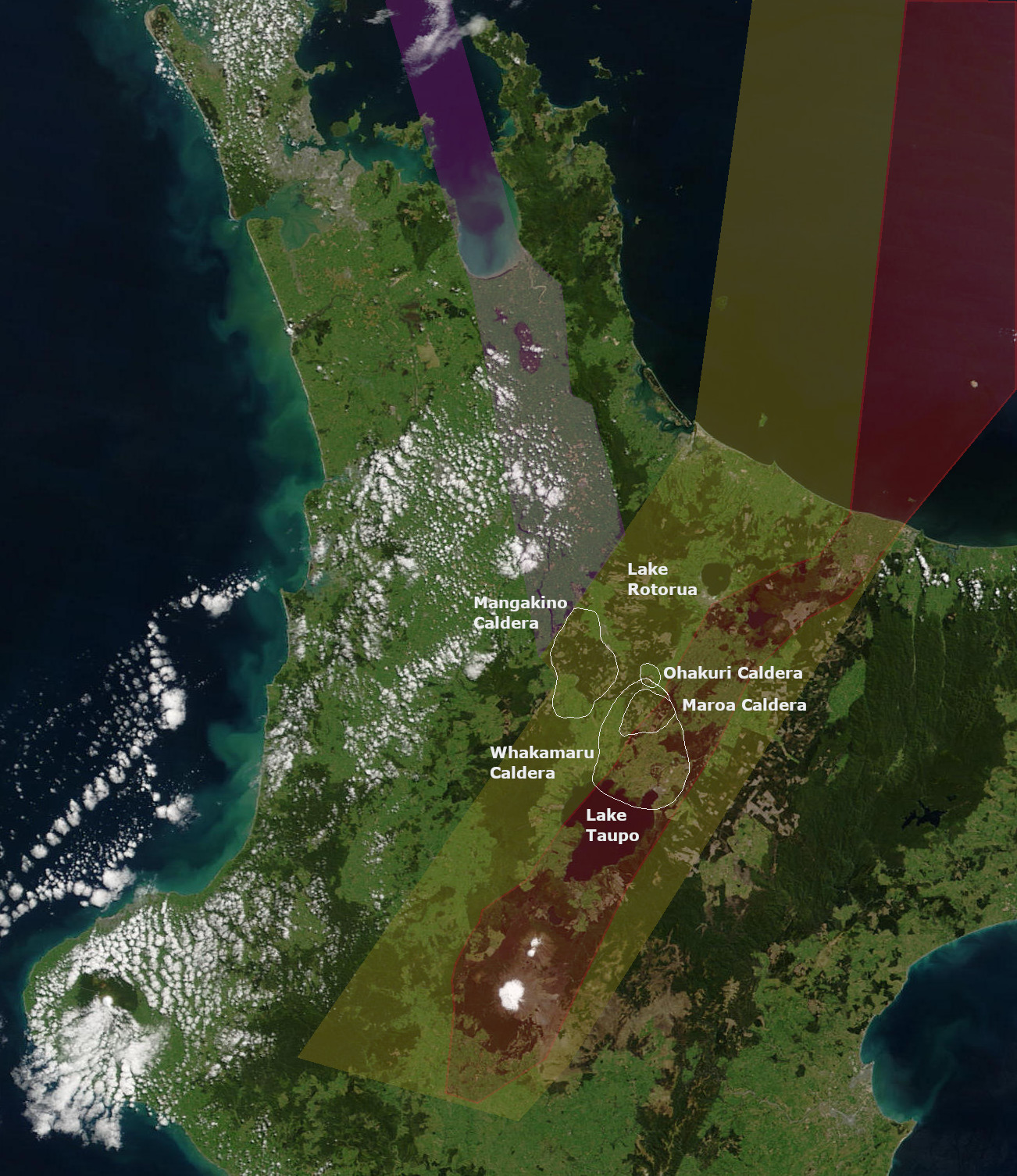
- Maroa Caldera approximate location and boundaries contained within the older Whakamaru Caldera. The Ohakuri Caldera which had a paired eruption with the Rotorua Caldera is to its north and was not recognised as a separate caldera historically. To its west is the oldest Mangakino Caldera of the old Taupō Rift (yellow shading). Also shown is the modern Taupō Rift (red shading), Hauraki Rift (purple shading) and landmarks of Lake Taupō and Lake Rotorua

Highest point
- Peak: Maroanui
- Elevation: 897 m (2,943 ft)
- Coordinates: 38°31′11″S 176°01′19″E

Dimensions
- Length: 25 km (16 mi)
- Width: 16 km (9.9 mi)

Geography
- Location within North Island
- Map centered to show selected surface volcanic deposits in area of postulated Maroa Caldera/Volcanic Centre (light green shading, boundary particularly in south-east ill defined). The present surface ignimbrite is various light violet shades which are identical for any single source, but other eruptions may breakup the mutual ignimbrite sheets. White shading has been used for other postulated calderas (usually subsurface now) including the older overlapping Whakamaru Caldera. Legend: Key for the volcanics that are shown with panning is: basalt (shades of brown/orange); monogenetic basalts; undifferentiated basalts of the Tangihua Complex in Northland Allochthon; arc basalts; arc ring basalts; dacite; andesite (shades of red); basaltic andesite; rhyolite (ignimbrite is lighter shades of violet); plutonic; White shading is selected caldera features.; Clicking on the rectangle icon enables full window and mouse-over with volcano name/wikilink and ages before present.
- Location: North Island
- Country: New Zealand
- Region: Waikato
- Range coordinates: 38°25′12″S 176°4′48″E

Geology
- Rock age: Quaternary (0.305–0.014 Ma)
- Mountain type: Caldera
- Volcanic zone: Taupō Volcanic Zone
- Last eruption: 11,300 years BP (Note: The date of the last eruption has been constrained to be more recent than first determinations, but there are technical complexities to the dating. The SHCal20 atmospheric curve radiocarbon calibration curve used allows two possible close by dates in this period, consistent zircon and carbon dating BP exists, but it is also known to have been a multiphase eruption separated by at least 83 years which is much smaller than the other potential dating errors.)

Climbing
- Access: State Highway 1 (New Zealand)

The Maroa Caldera (Maroa volcanic centre, Maroa volcanic complex, Maroa dome complex) is approximately 16 km × 25 km (9.9 mi × 15.5 mi) in size and is located in the north-east corner of the earlier Whakamaru caldera in the Taupō Volcanic Zone in the North Island of New Zealand. Volcanic activity in the complex commenced over 300,000 years ago and the most recent volcanic eruption within it was c. 9,400 years BCE.

== Geography ==
Its northern rim is to the south of the Waikato River at Ātiamuri. At Ātiamuri the Ohakuri Caldera which had a paired eruption with the Rotorua Caldera is to its immediate north. The eastern boundary is also defined by the present Waikato River and it extends as far south as probably opposite Orakei Korako on the river. The southern boundary is somewhat ill-defined given the subsequent deep deposits from the Taupō Volcano but includes a number of domes of which the highest is Maroanui at 897 metres (2,943 ft).

== Eruptive history ==
The Maroa Caldera's last major eruption produced 140 km^{3} (33.6 cu mi) of tephra about 230,000 years ago (230 ka). Its earliest eruption was about 300 ka with decreasing frequency and volume to as recently as 11.3 ± 1.7 ka cal. before present (BP), when an eruption of about 0.25 km^{3} (0.1 cu mi) occurred from the Puketarata volcanic complex (38°33′02″S 176°03′16″E to distinguish from another older volcano of this name near Te Kawa). The caldera is now mainly dome lava in filled. In summary going back in time:

- 11,300 ± 1,700 years ago most recent eruption of Puketarata tuff ring, which formed with total volume of 0.25 km^{3} (0.060 cu mi) in a complex multiphase series of eruptions including maar formation
- 229,000 to 196,000 years ago Pukeahua deposits and dome building
- 220,000 years ago but unclear where this Mokai ignimbrite that outcrops in some of the Maroa area comes from
- 229,000 ± 12,000 years ago Ātiamuri deposits from northern Maroa
- 251,000 ± 17,000 years ago onward two large parallel dome complexes developed
- 256,000 ± 12,000 years ago Orakonui pyroclastics from a central Maroa source
- 272,000 ± 10,000 years ago Putauaki pyroclastics from a central Maroa source
- 275,000 to 240,000 years ago small-scale pyroclastic eruptions
- 283,000 ± 11,000 years ago Korotai deposits from northern Maroa
- 305,000 ± 17,000 years ago oldest Maroa dome
