= Tikitere Graben =

Geological feature in the North Island of New Zealand

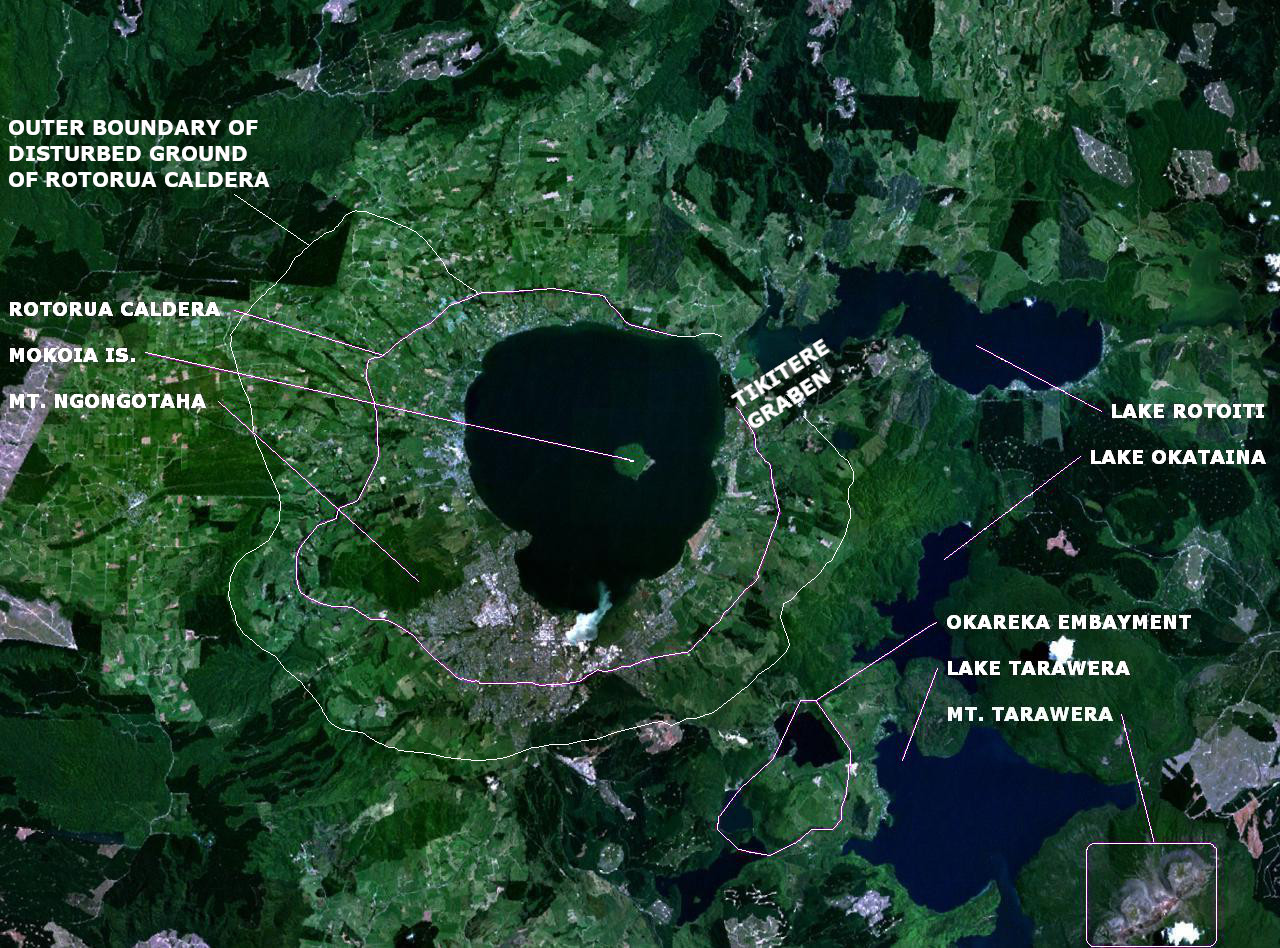
- NASA image identifying the Tikitere Graben relative to the Rotorua Caldera. South of the lake that fills much of the apparently circular caldera is the town of Rotorua. The western portion of Lake Rotoiti is in the graben. The eastern portion of Lake Rotoiti contains eruption craters now filled with water.

- Location within North Island
- Floor elevation: 280 m (920 ft)
- Length: 15 km (9.3 mi) approximately
- Width: 5 km (3.1 mi) approximately

Geology
- Type: intra-rift garben
- Age: 240,000 years

Geography
- Location: North Island
- Country: New Zealand
- State/Province: Bay of Plenty
- Coordinates: 38°02′36″S 176°20′07″E
- River: Ohau Channel
- Interactive map of Tikitere Graben

The Tikitere Graben is an intra-rift graben in the North Island of New Zealand that contains the Ohau Channel, which drains Lake Rotorua into Lake Rotoiti with a minimal drop between the lakes.

== Geography ==
The Ohau Channel ultimately allows both lakes to drain into the Kaituna River through drainage that is also associated with the graben. The Tikitere Graben also is associated with the geothermal tourist attraction of Hell's Gate and the western aspects of Lake Rotoiti.

== Ecology ==
From the 1950s onward the water quality of Lake Rotoiti deteriorated due to drainage into the lake via the Ohau Channel of water from Lake Rotorua that had high phytoplankton and nutrient concentrations. In July 2008 a wall was completed that directed the outflow of the Ohau Channel towards the Okere Arm in Lake Rotoiti, with the aim of reducing water mixing in Lake Rotoiti before outflow into the Kaituna River. The wall meet its design parameters. As of 2020, because of perhaps this measure amongst others, there is stable water quality in Lake Rotoiti.

The Ohau Channel itself is regularly monitored for fish biodiversity with reducing abundance of the common bully in the period between 2007 and 2012. This continued into 2016 with changes observed in other river fish.

=== Geology ===
The Tikitere Graben is subsiding at 0.2 cm/year (0.079 in/year) and has destroyed the Rotorua Caldera rim at this point, so providing the current natural outlet for Lake Rotorua. The graben is a tectonic intra-rift graben within the Taupō Rift and is delimited by two unnamed active faults in the current active NZ fault database (#3590 and #2210). These north-west to south-east trending faults could be modelled to suggest the graben is being produced by a transtensional stress regime or as an accommodation zone between offset spreading centres. Historically some suspect that the graben did not exist, after the Rotorua Caldera forming Mamaku eruption of approximately 240,000 years ago. After this, the lake filled to a maximum elevation of 414 m (1,358 ft) above sea level.

The drainage of this initial Lake Rotorua is not known, but would have been through the Tikitere Graben most of the time since. The outlet was perhaps initially through the Hemo Gap to the south of the present town of Rotorua. Whatever there has been drainage at times through the Hemo Gap, and at some stage drainage of Rotorua Lake through the Tikitere Graben became established prior to the Rotoiti eruption in the Ōkataina Volcanic Centre of 47,400 years ago. Drainage may not have been through what seems to be a very young Kaituna River gorge and a possible route far to the east beyond the present eastern end of Lake Rotoiti is suspected.

It is known that after the Rotoiti eruption Lake Rotorua rose to an elevation of just over 370 m (1,210 ft) and at a later stage drained through the Tikitere Graben back into what is now Lake Rotoiti scoring an approximately 1 km (0.62 mi) wide, 60 m (200 ft) deep channel in the western arm of Lake Rotoiti to reach initially the eastern Rotoiti craters of the Haroharo caldera in the Ōkataina Volcanic Centre and then on to the sea. By about 9500 years ago dome building activity in the eastern Haroharo portions of the Ōkataina Volcanic Centre had raised Lake Rotoiti to a maximum elevation of 294 m (965 ft) so it started flowing down the Kaituna River and in due course further graben sinking resulted in both lakes having the near common outlet level of today's 280 m (920 ft).
