= Taupō Fault Belt =

- Map of approximate active fault limits within the Taupō Fault Belt portion of the Taupō Rift. Detailed mapping is not appropriate as field work has shown many more active faults than are in current databases.
- Etymology: Taupō
- Year defined: 1960
- Country: New Zealand
- Region: Waikato Region

Characteristics
- Range: Up to 6.5 Mw
- Segments: many
- Length: 20 km (12 mi)

Tectonics
- Plate: Indo-Australian
- Status: Active
- Type: Normal faults
- Age: Miocene-Holocene
- Volcanic arc/belt: Taupō Volcanic Zone
- New Zealand geology database (includes faults)

The Taupō Fault Belt contains many almost parallel active faults, and is located in the Taupō Rift of the central North Island of New Zealand geographically between Lake Taupō and the lakes of Rotorua, Tarawera, Rotomahana and Rerewhakaaitu. The potential active fault density is very high, with only 0.1 to 1 km (0.062 to 0.621 mi) separating the north-east to south-west orientated normal fault strands on detailed mapping of part of the belt. The Waikato River bisects the western region of the belt.

== Geology ==
The northern Taupō Fault Belt is in the area also referred to as either, the Paeroa Graben or the Kapenga Graben, between the Horohoro Fault and the Paeroa Fault. Aligned with the orientation of the modern Taupō Rift are multiple north-north-east trending normal faults. These include the Ngakuru Fault to the east with the Ngakuru Graben between it and the Whirinaki Fault. Within the 14 km (8.7 mi) wide Ngakuru Graben are also to the west the Maleme Fault (Zone), which as a zone also contains the Mangaete/Lakeside Fault and to the east the Hossack Road Fault and the Te Weta Fault. The tectonic activity is driven by the ground subsiding at a rate of 0.3–0.4 cm/year (0.12–0.16 in/year) since 61,000 years ago with largely orthogonal rifting associated with subduction and the clockwise rotation of the northern North Island allowing the rift to open.

Some characterised faults in the northern Taupō Fault Belt
Fault/ Segment	Surface length	Estimated Risk Mw	Mean Slip rate (mm/year)	Reoccurance (year)
→ Ngakuru (South West)	9	6.0	0.5	950
→ Ngakuru (North East)	18	6.5	0.5	2300
Maleme	17	6.6	3.5	300
Mangatete - Lakeside	7	5.9	0.1	4500
Whirinaki	19.8	6.6	0.1 (0.75)	10700
→ Whirinaki West	10	6.1	0.2	2900
→ Whirinaki East	12	6.2	0.2 (1.4)	5100
Hossack Road	4	5.5	0.1	1700
Te Weta	35	6.3	0.4	2100
Paeroa	27	6.7	0.8	2300
→ Paeroa North	9	6.1	0.8	800
→ Paeroa Central	7	6.1	0.8	600
→ Paeroa South	10	6.2	0.8	900
Ngapouri-Rotomahana	16	6.4	0.17	4400
Horohoro	20	6.5	0.17	7400
Ongahoro	≥13	6.3	1.7	<3300
Rotohouhou	9.5	6.0	0.6	2900

The southern Taupō Fault Belt is bounded to the west by a zone of faults that include the Thorpe - Poplar Fault in the north and the Whangamata fault zone. Between these faults and the eastern edge of the belt bounded by the Aratiatia fault zone to the north and the Rotokawa Fault to the south there are many intra-rift faults associated with the active extension by 8 mm (0.31 in)/year ± 2 mm (0.079 in). This is similar to the case in the northern Taupō Fault Belt and modern earthquake swarm analysis allows many of these faults to be assigned to distinct zones. Accordingly there is a Kaiapo fault zone just to the west of the town of Taupō and the Ngangiho fault zone just to the east of Kinloch with between them a Whakaipo fault zone. Also active in the north of the southern Taupō Fault Belt are the Puketarata, Orakeikorako, Lake Ohakuri, Tuahu and the Orakonui Faults.

Detailed mapping, supplemented by deep ground trenching, of a portion of the southern Taupō Fault Belt prior to construction of a geothermal power station not only showed how inaccurate the inferred active fault tracings in this area are, with under counting potential active fault strands by a factor of perhaps two, it also caused the relocation of the power station.

=== Tectonic Volcanic Relationships ===
There are discontinuities in the definable faults of the modern Taupō Rift imposed by its caldera's, with the Taupō Volcano and the Ōkataina Volcanic Centre at the southern and northern end of the Taupō Fault Belt respectively defining the limits of its predominant tectonic activity. Tectonic activity predominates in the present rift also south of Lake Taupō until the active andesitic volcanoes of the North Island Volcanic Plateau are reached or from the Ōkataina Caldera north through the Whakatāne Graben to the active andesitic volcano of Whakaari / White Island. The recently active vents in the main volcanoes are not aligned with currently active faults in the Taupō Fault Belt but there are interactions and for example there was a complete fault rupture of the Ngapouri-Rotomahana Fault just prior to the 1314±12 CE Kaharoa eruption of Mount Tarawera.

The 2001 Taupō earthquake swarm started within a very constrained area of the Taupō Volcano under the northwestern portion of Lake Taupō within the Oruanui caldera. It spread out horizontally over time with small size predominantly strike-slip faulting constrained to zones associated with the tectonic normal faults. This is consistent with a mafic magma intrusion (rather than one associated with the rhyolytic eruptions of Taupō) causing pressure over predominantly time, rather than place perpendicular to the usual strain on these fault systems and has been seen elsewhere. This is consistent with seismicity rather than volcanic activity poses the main short-term hazard at Taupō Volcano.
