= Taupō Volcanic Zone =

Active volcanic zone in New Zealand

- Volcanic area
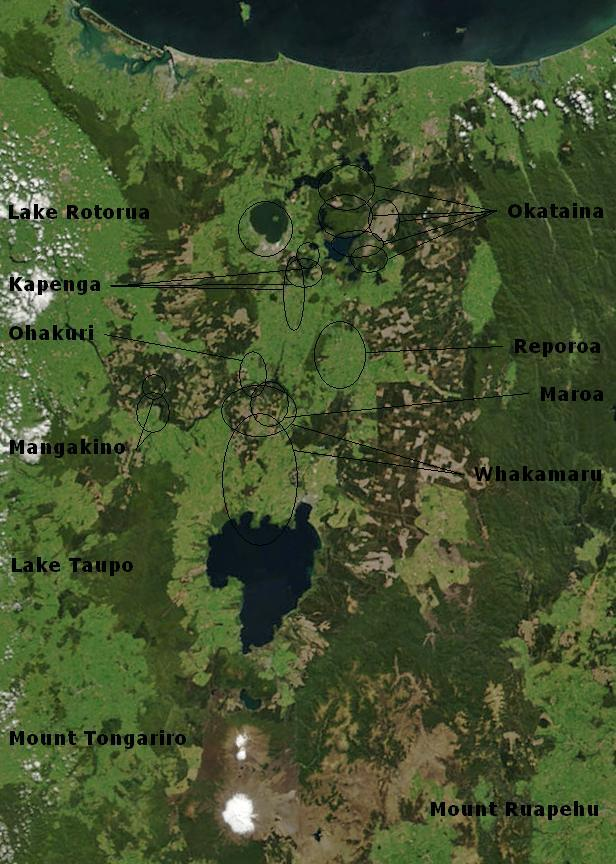
- Volcano and historic lake/caldera locations in the Taupō Volcanic Zone. The distance between the town of Rotorua and the town of Taupō is 80 km. (White Island is not shown.)

- Location within New Zealand Location within North Island
- Coordinates: 38°40′00″S 176°01′00″E
- Location: North Island
- Age: Miocene - Holocene
- Formed by: Volcanic action
- Geology: see Taupō Rift
- Highest elevation: 2,797 m (9,177 ft) (Mount Ruapehu)

The Taupō Volcanic Zone (TVZ) is a volcanic area in the North Island of New Zealand. It has been active for at least the past two million years and is still highly active.

Mount Ruapehu marks its south-western end and the zone runs north-eastward through the Taupō and Rotorua areas and offshore into the Bay of Plenty. It is part of a larger Central Volcanic Region that extends to the Coromandel Peninsula and has been active for four million years. The zone is contained within the tectonic intra-arc continental Taupō Rift and this rift volcanic zone is widening unevenly east–west, with the greatest rate of widening at the Bay of Plenty coast, the least at Mount Ruapehu and a rate of about 8 mm (0.31 in) per year at Taupō. The zone is named after Lake Taupō, the flooded caldera of the largest volcano in the zone, the Taupō Volcano and contains a large central volcanic plateau as well as other landforms.

== Activity ==
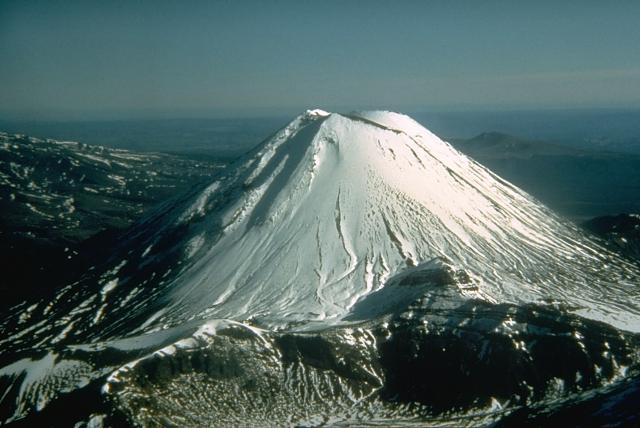
Mount Ngauruhoe

There are numerous volcanic vents and geothermal fields in the zone, with Mount Ruapehu, Mount Ngauruhoe and Whakaari / White Island erupting most frequently. Whakaari has been in continuous activity since 1826 counting steaming fumaroles, but the same applies to say the Okataina volcanic centre. The Taupō Volcanic Zone has produced in the last 350,000 years over 3,900 cubic kilometres (940 cu mi) material, more than anywhere else on Earth, from over 300 silicic eruptions, with 12 of these eruptions being caldera-forming. Detailed stratigraphy in the zone is only available from the Ōkataina Rotoiti eruption but including this event, the zone has been more productive than any other rhyolite predominant volcanic area over the last 50,000 odd years at 12.8 km^{3} (3.1 cu mi) per thousand years. Comparison of large events in the Taupō volcanic zone over the last 1.6 million years at 3.8 km^{3} (0.91 cu mi) per thousand years with Yellowstone Caldera's 2.1 million year productivity at 3.0 km^{3} (0.72 cu mi) per thousand years favours Taupo. Both the Taupō Volcano and the Ōkataina Caldera have had multiple eruptions in the last 25,000 years. The zone's largest eruption since the arrival of Europeans was that of Mount Tarawera (within the Ōkataina Caldera) in 1886, which killed over 100 people. Early Māori would also have been affected by the much larger Kaharoa eruption from Tarawera around 1315 CE.

The last major eruption from Lake Taupō, the Hatepe eruption, occurred in 232 CE. It is believed to have first emptied the lake, then followed that feat with a pyroclastic flow that covered about 20,000 km^{2} (7,700 sq mi) of land with volcanic ash. A total of 120 km^{3} (29 cu mi) of material expressed as dense-rock equivalent (DRE) is believed to have been ejected, and over 30 km^{3} (7.2 cu mi) of material is estimated to have been ejected in just a few minutes. The date of this activity was previously thought to be 186 AD as the ash expulsion was thought to be sufficiently large to turn the sky red over Rome and China (as documented in Hou Han Shu), but this has since been disproven.

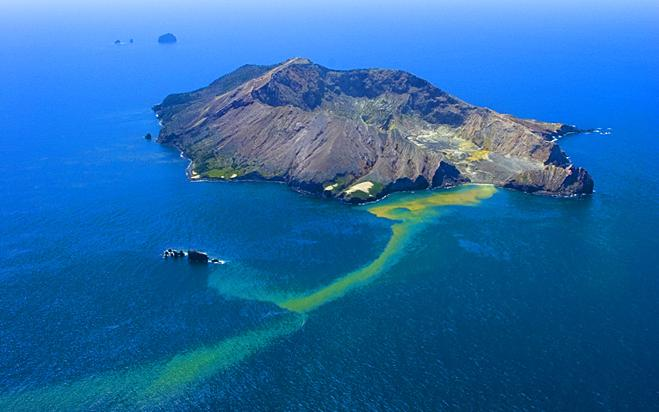
Whakaari / White Island

Whakaari / White Island had a major, edifice failure collapse of its volcano dated to 946 BCE ± 52 years. It has been suggested that this was the cause of the tsunami tens of metres tall that went up to 7 kilometres (4.3 mi) inland in the Bay of Plenty at about this time. Although significant tsunamis can be associated with volcanic eruptions, it is unknown if the cause was a relatively small eruption of Whakaari or another cause such as a large local earthquake.

Taupō erupted an estimated 1,170 km^{3} (280 cu mi) of DRE material in its Oruanui eruption 25,580 years ago. This was Earth's most recent eruption reaching VEI-8, the highest level on the Volcanic Explosivity Index.

The Rotorua caldera has been dormant longer, with its main eruption occurring about 225,000 years ago, although lava dome extrusion has occurred within the last 25,000 years.

== Extent and geological context ==
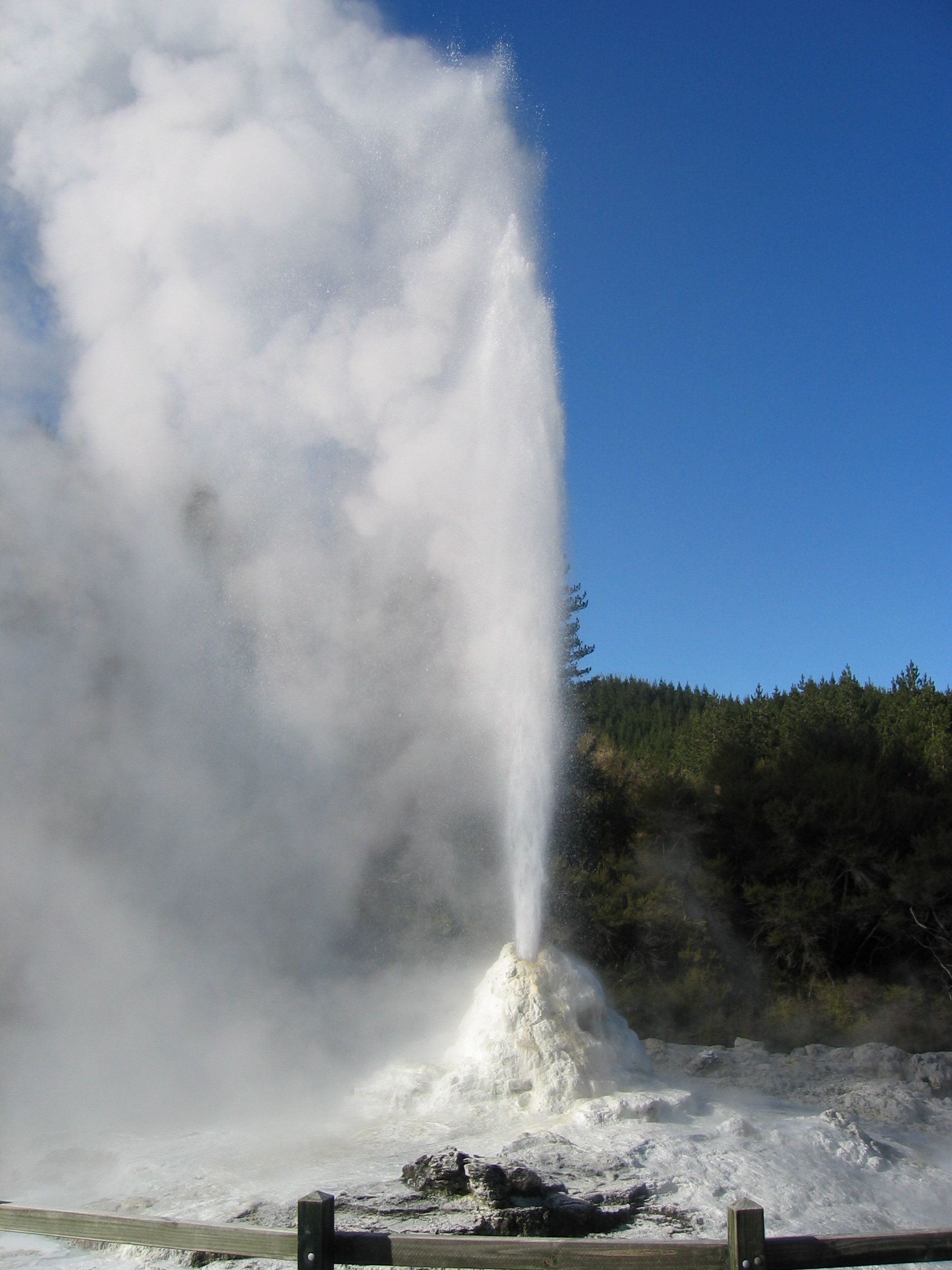
Lady Knox Geyser, Waiotapu geothermal area

The Taupō volcanic zone is approximately 350 kilometres (217 mi) long by 50 kilometres (31 mi) wide. Mount Ruapehu marks its southwestern end, while Whakaari / White Island is considered its northeastern limit.

It forms a southern portion of the active Lau-Havre-Taupō back-arc basin, which lies behind the Kermadec-Tonga Subduction Zone. Mayor Island and Mount Taranaki are recently active back arc volcanoes on the New Zealand extension of this arc. Mayor Island / Tūhua is the northern-most shield volcano adjacent to the New Zealand coast, and is believed to have been active in the last 1000 years. It is formed from rhyolite magma. It has a quite complex eruptive history but only with one definite significant Plinian eruption. Mount Taranaki is an andesite cone and the most recent of four Taranaki volcanoes about 140 km (87 mi) west of the Taupō Volcanic Zone.

Associated with the Taupō volcanic zone, intra-arc extension is expressed as normal faulting within a zone known as the Taupō Rift. Volcanic activity continues to the north-northeast, along the line of the Taupō Volcanic Zone, through several undersea volcanoes in the South Kermadec Ridge Seamounts, then shifts eastward to the parallel volcanic arc of the Kermadec Islands and Tonga. Although the back-arc basin continues to propagate to the south-west, with the South Wanganui Basin forming an initial back-arc basin, volcanic activity has not yet begun in this region.

South of Kaikōura the plate boundary changes to a transform boundary with oblique continental collision uplifting the Southern Alps in the South Island. A subduction zone reappears south-west of Fiordland, at the south-western corner of the South Island, although here the subduction is in the opposite direction. Solander Island / Hautere is an extinct volcano associated with this subduction zone, and the only one that protrudes above the sea.

== Scientific study ==
=== Tectonics ===
In the North Island rifting associated with plate tectonics has defined a Central Volcanic Region, that has been active for four million years and this extends westward from the Taupō volcanic zone through the western Bay of Plenty to the eastern side of the Coromandel Peninsula. The dominant rifting axis associated with the Central Volcanic Region has moved with time, from the back-arc associated Hauraki Rift to the intra-arc Taupō Rift. As there is presently no absolute consensus with regard to the cause of the Taupō Rift's extension or its exceptional current volcanic productivity, some of the discussion on this page has been simplified, rather than all possible models being presented.

Recent scientific work indicates that the Earth's crust below the Taupō Volcanic Zone may be as little as 16 kilometres thick. A film of magma 50 kilometres (30 mi) wide and 160 kilometres (100 mi) long lies 10 kilometres under the surface. The geological record indicates that some of the volcanoes in the area erupt infrequently but have large, violent and destructive eruptions when they do. Technically the zone is in the continental intraarc Taupō Rift, which is a continuation of oceanic plate structures associated with oblique Australian and Pacific Plate convergence in the Hikurangi subduction zone. At Taupō the rift volcanic zone is widening east–west at the rate of about 8 mm (0.31 in)/year, while at Mount Ruapehu it is only 2–4 mm (0.079–0.157 in)/year and this increases at the north eastern end at the Bay of Plenty coast to 10–15 mm (0.39–0.59 in)/year. The rift has had three active stages of faulting in the last 2 million years with the modern Taupō rift evolving in the last 25,000 years after the massive Oruanui eruption and now being within two essentially inactive rift systems. These are the surrounding limits of the young Taupō Rift between 25,000 and 350,000 years and old Taupō Rift system whose northern boundary is now located well to the north of the other two being created before 350,000 years ago.

The Tauranga Volcanic Centre which was active between 2.95 to 1.9 million years ago, and was previously classified as part of the Central Volcanic Region, appears now to be in a tectonic continuum with the Taupō Volcanic Zone. Recent ocean floor tephra studies off the east coast of the North Island have shown an abrupt compositional change in these, from about 4.5 million years ago, that has been suggested to distinguish Coromandel Volcanic Zone activity from that of the Taupō Volcanic Zone. Further the distinctive Waiteariki ignimbrite that erupted 2.1 million years ago in a supereruption, presumably from the gravity anomaly defined Omanawa Caldera, is within the postulated borders of the old Taupō Rift.

==== Faults ====
The multiple intra-rift faults are some of the most active in the country and some have the potential to create over magnitude 7 events. The fault structures are perhaps most well characterised related to the Ruapehu and Tongariro grabens. The recent deposits from major eruptions and lake features mean many potentially significant faults are uncharacterised, either completely (for example the 6.5 MW 1987 Edgecumbe earthquake resulted in the mapping of the Edgecumbe fault for the first time) or frequency of events and their likely magnitude are not understood. It can not be assumed that just because the rate of expansion of the rift is greatest near the coast that this is where most significant tectonic earthquakes in terms of human risk will be. The Waihi Fault Zone south of Lake Taupō and associated with the Tongariro graben has a particular risk of inducing massive landslips which has caused significant loss of life and appears to be more active than many other faults in the zone.

=== Volcanism ===
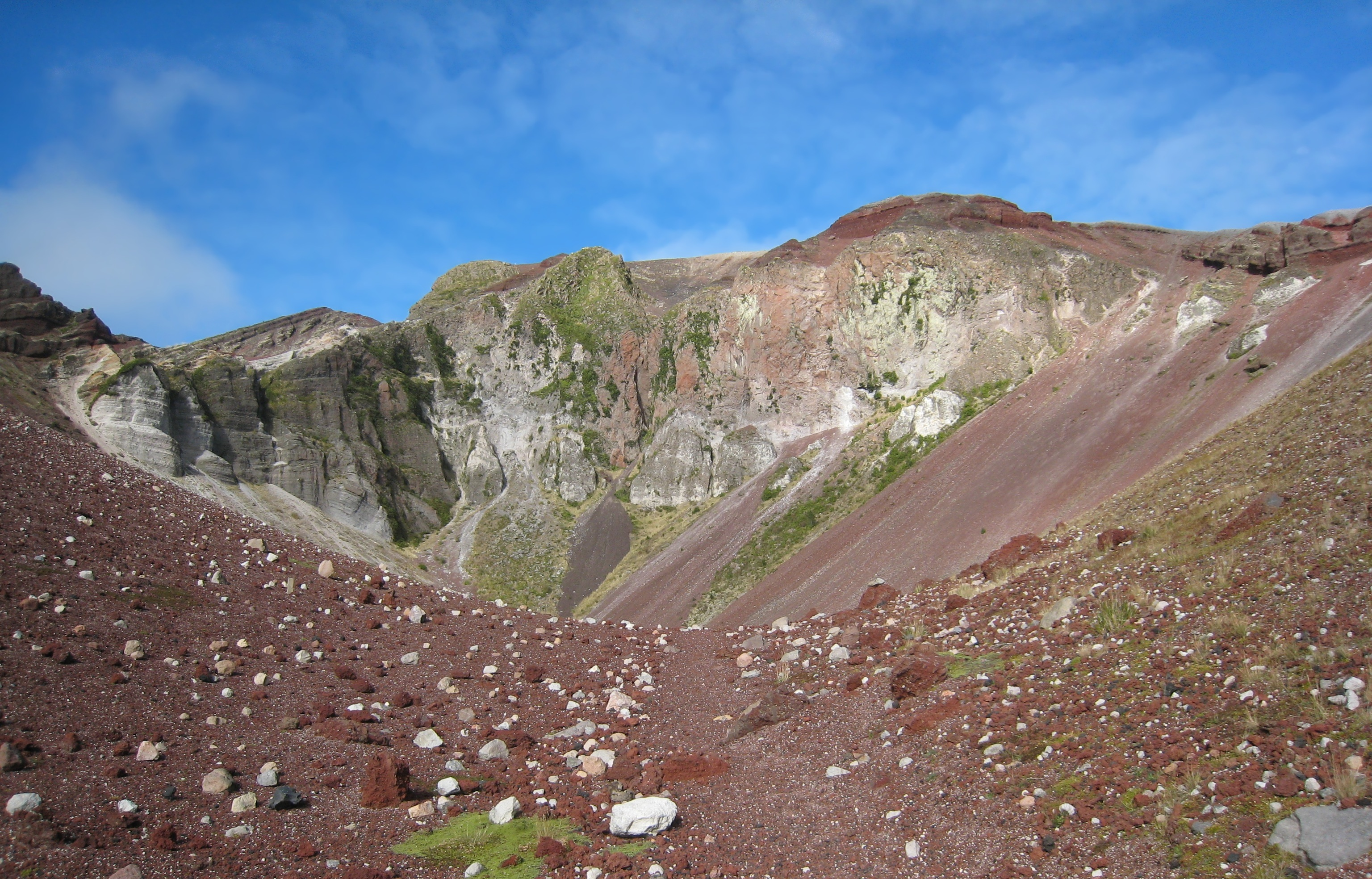
In 1886, Mount Tarawera produced New Zealand's largest historic eruption since European colonisation

The north (Whakatane Graben – Bay of Plenty) part of the zone is predominantly formed from andesitic magma and represented by the continuously active Whakaari / White Island andesite–dacite stratovolcano. Although Strombolian activity has occurred the explosive eruptions are typically phreatic or phreatomagmatic. The active emergent summit tops the larger, 16 kilometres (9.9 mi) × 18 kilometres (11 mi), submarine volcano with a total volume of 78 km^{3} (19 cu mi).

The central part of the zone is composed of eight caldera centres the oldest of which is the Mangakino caldera which was active more than a million years ago (1.62–0.91 Ma). This produced ignimbrite that 170 km (110 mi) away in Auckland is up to 9 m (30 ft) thick. Other than the now buried Kapenga caldera there are five caldera centres, Rotorua, Ohakuri, Reporoa, Ōkataina and Taupō. These have resulted from massive infrequent eruptions of gaseous very viscous rhyolite magma which is rich in silicon, potassium, and sodium and created the ignimbrite sheets of the North Island Volcanic Plateau. The detailed composition suggests subduction erosion might play a predominant role in producing this rhyolite, as later assimilation and fractional crystallization of primary basalt magma, is difficult to model to explain the composition and volumes erupted. This central zone has had the largest number of very large silicic caldera-forming eruptions recently on earth as mentioned earlier.

During a period of less than 100,000 years commencing with the massive Whakamaru eruption about 335,000 years ago of greater than 2,000 km^{3} (480 cu mi) dense-rock equivalent of material, just to the north of the present Lake Taupō, over 4,000 km^{3} (960 cu mi) total was erupted. These eruptions essentially defined the limits of the present central volcanic plateau, although its current central landscape is mainly a product of later smaller events over the last 200,000 years than the Whakamaru eruption. The other volcanic plateau defining eruptions were to the west, the 150 km^{3} (36 cu mi) Matahina eruption of about 280,000 years ago, the mainly tephra 50 km^{3} (12 cu mi) Chimp (Chimpanzee) eruption between 320 and 275 ka, the central 50 km^{3} (12 cu mi) Pokai eruption of about 275 ka, and the paired Mamaku to the north and east central Ohakuri eruptions of about 240,000 years ago that together produced more than 245 km^{3} (59 cu mi) dense-rock equivalent of material. The southern Taupō Volcano Oruanui eruption about 25,600 years ago produced 530 km^{3} (130 cu mi) dense-rock equivalent of material and its recent Hatepe eruption of 232 CE ± 10 years had 120 km^{3} (29 cu mi) dense-rock equivalent. Since the Whakamaru eruption the central part of the zone has dominated, so that when the whole zone is considered there has been about 3,000 km^{3} (720 cu mi) of rhyolite, 300 km^{3} (72 cu mi) of andesite, 20 km^{3} (4.8 cu mi) of dacite and 5 km^{3} (1.2 cu mi) of basalt erupted.

Less gaseous rhyolite magma dome building effusive eruptions have built features such as the Horomatangi Reefs or Motutaiko Island in Lake Taupō or the lava dome of Mount Tarawera. This later as part of the Ōkataina caldera complex is the highest risk volcanic field in New Zealand to man. Mount Tauhara adjacent to Lake Taupō is actually a dacitic dome and so intermediate in composition between andesite and rhyolite but still more viscous than basalt which is rarely found in the zone.

The southern part of the zone contain classic volcanic cone structure formed from andesite magma in effusive eruptions that cool to form dark grey lava if gas-poor or scoria if gas-rich of this part of the zone. Mount Ruapehu, the tallest mountain in the North Island, is a 150 km^{3} (36 cu mi) andesite cone surrounded by a 150 km^{3} (36 cu mi) ring-plain. This ring plain is formed from numerous volcanic deposits created by slope failure, eruptions, or lahars. Northwest of Ruapehu is Hauhungatahi, the oldest recorded volcano in the south of the plateau, with to the north the two prominent volcanic mountains in the Tongariro volcanic centre being Tongariro and Ngauruhoe which are part of a single composite stratovolcano.

=== Risks ===
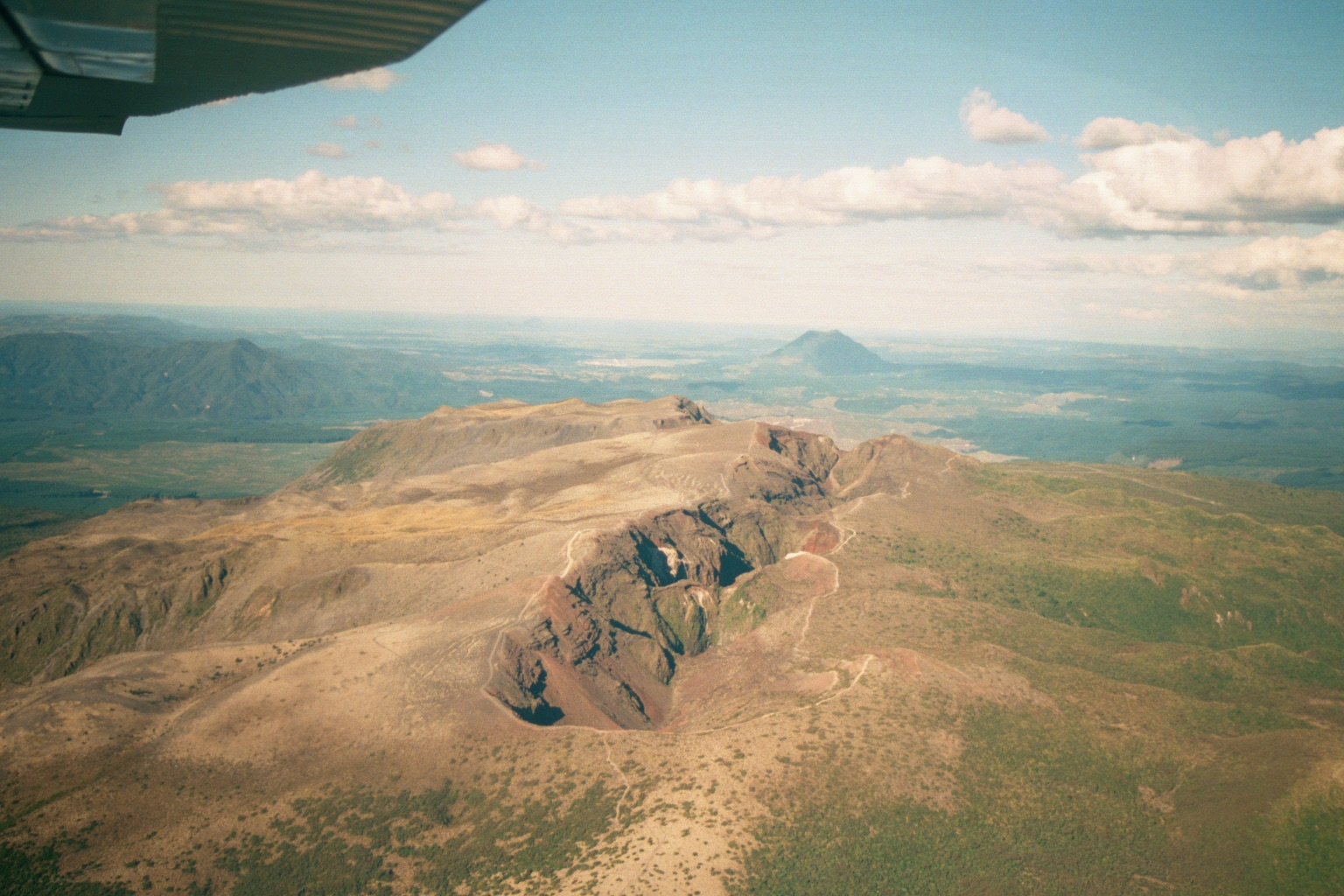
Southwest side of Mount Tarawera, Mount Edgecumbe on the background.

The most likely risk is earthquake associated with multiple active faults, such as within the Taupō Fault Belt, but many faults will be uncharacterised as was the case with the 1987 Edgecumbe earthquake. Earthquakes can be associated with landslides and inland or coastal tsunami that can result in great loss of life and both have happened on the Waihi Fault Zone. The relative low grade volcanic activity of the andesite volcanoes at each end of the zone has resulted in recorded history in both direct loss of life and disrupted transport and tourism. The only high grade eruption in recorded history was atypically basaltic from Mount Tarawera and although very destructive is not likely to be a perfect model for the more typical and often larger rhyolitic events associated with the Taupō Volcano and the Ōkataina Caldera. As mentioned earlier the Ōkataina caldera complex is the highest risk volcanic field risk in New Zealand to man and the recent frequency of rhyolitic events there is not reassuring, along with the timescale of likely warning of such an event. These eruptions are associated with tephra production that results in deep ash fall over wide areas (e.g. the Whakatane eruption of ~ 5500 years ago had 5 mm (0.20 in) ashfall 900 km (560 mi) away on the Chatham Islands) ` pyroclastic flows and surges, which rarely have covered large areas of the North Island in ignimbrite sheets, earthquakes, lake tsunamis, prolonged lava dome growth and associated block and ash flows with post-eruption lahars and flooding.

== Volcanoes, lakes and geothermal fields ==
Map of selected volcanic features as rectangular symbols for the Taupō Volcanic Zone. Volcanoes classified as active are shown as red, other notable volcanoes (there are many more) are shown as orange, geothermal areas as light blue and if active hydrothermal eruptions as blue. It is possible by clicking on the map to get a full screen view that enables mouseover to show a label (often wiki-linked) for each symbol.

Map of selected surface volcanic deposits centred on the Taupō Volcanic Zone, allowing wider volcanic context. Clicking on the map enlarges it, and enables panning and mouseover of volcanic deposits name/wikilink and ages before present. The key to the shading of the volcanics that are shown is rhyolite – violet, ignimbrite – lighter shades of violet, dacite – purple, basalt – brown, monogenetic basalts – dark brown, undifferentiated basalts of the Tangihua Complex in Northland Allochthon – light brown, arc basalts – deep orange brown, arc ring basalts -orange brown, andesite – red, basaltic andesite`- light red, and plutonic – gray. White shading has been used for postulated calderas (usually subsurface now).

The following Volcanic Centres belong to the modern Taupō Volcanic Zone in what proved to be an evolving classification scheme:

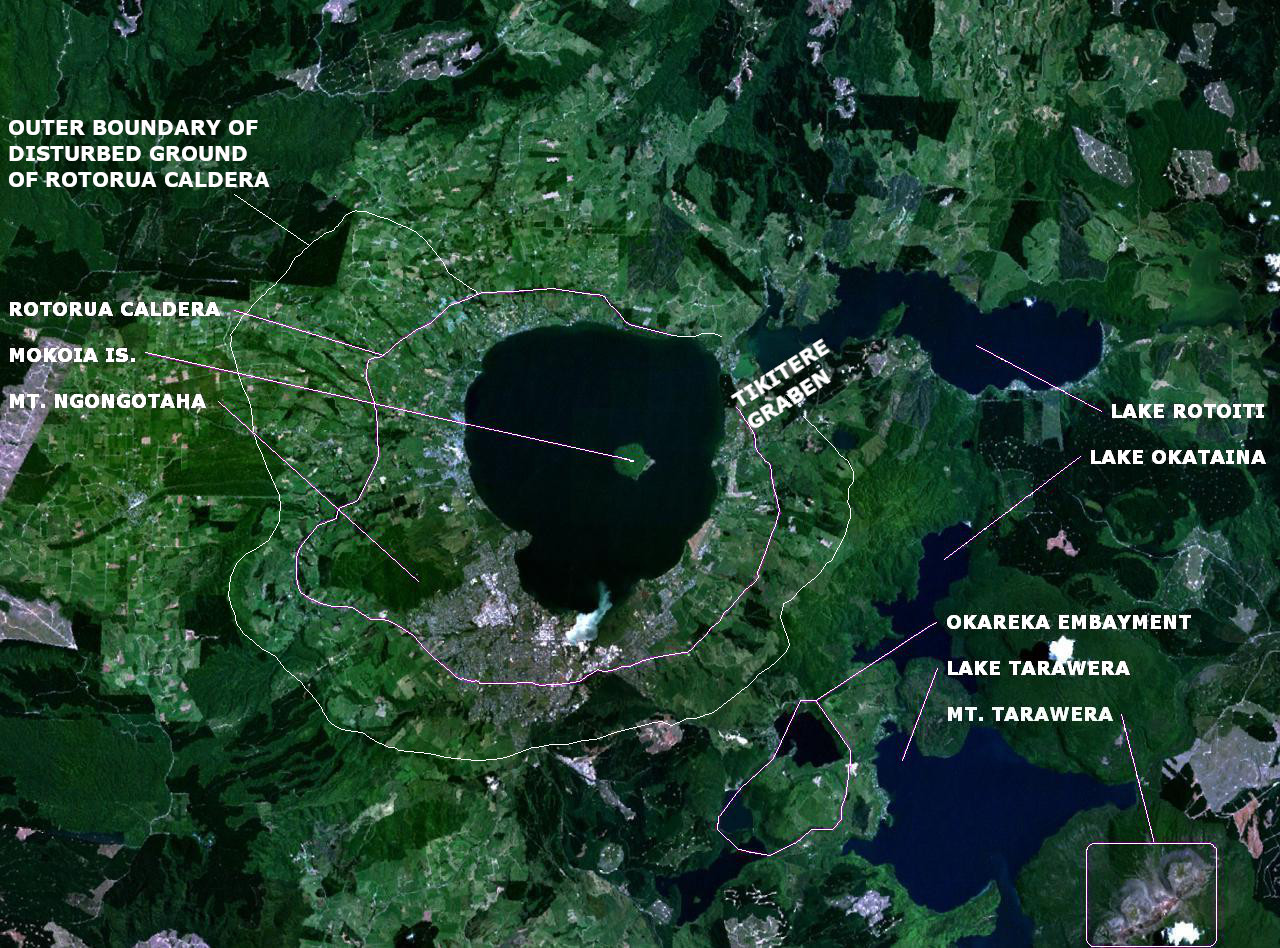
Satellite view of the Lake Rotorua Caldera. Mount Tarawera is in the lower right corner.

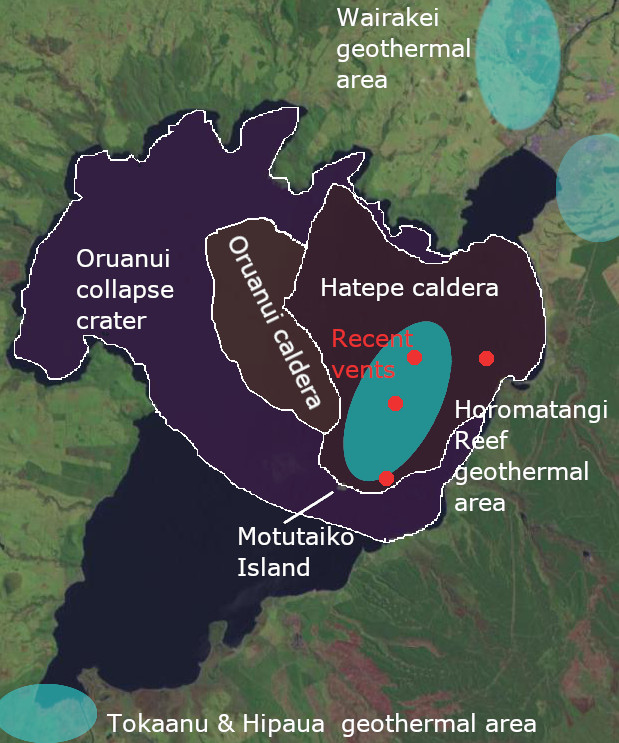
Recent major volcanic features Lake Taupō showing relationship to recent volcanic vents in red and present active geothermal systems in light blue.

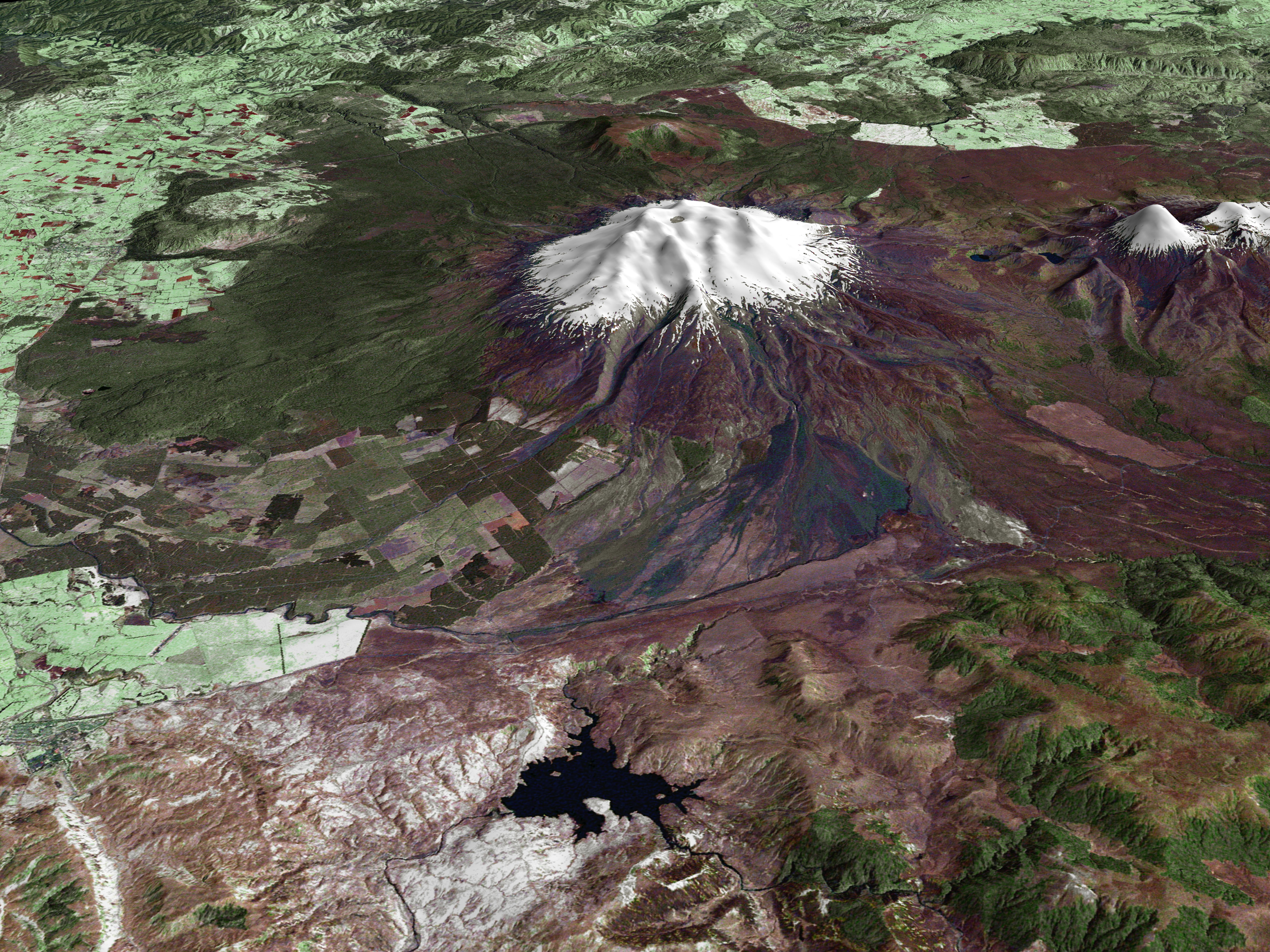
Composite satellite image of Mount Ruapehu

Rotorua, Ōkataina, Maroa, Taupō, Tongariro and Mangakino. The old zone almost certainly contains volcanoes in the Tauranga Volcanic Centre.

- Tauranga Volcanic Centre – Bay of Plenty
  - Activity commenced here over two million years ago and is now extinct.
- Whakatāne Graben – Bay of Plenty
  - Submarine Whakatāne Seamount 36°48′S 177°30′E
  - Mayor Island / Tūhua 37°17′S 176°15′E
  - Moutohora Island 37°51′23″S 176°58′24″E
  - Whakaari / White Island 37°31′S 177°11′E
    - Te Paepae o Aotea
  - Putauaki 38°06′S 176°48′E
  - Geothermal field
    - Kawerau Power Station 38°03′47″S 176°43′38″E
- Rotorua Volcanic Centre
  - Rotorua Caldera, size: 22 km wide 38°05′S 176°16′E
  - Mount Ngongotahā 38.118973°S 176.198095°E
  - Lakes
    - Lake Rotorua 38°05′S 176°16′E
      - Mokoia Island 38°05′S 176°18′E
  - Geothermal fields
    - Tikitere/Hell's Gate 38.065°S 176.361°E
    - Whakarewarewa 38°9′44″S 176°15′23″E
      - Pōhutu Geyser (Te Puia)
- Ōkataina Volcanic Centre: The Haroharo and Tarawera complexes impounded the lakes against the outer margins of the Ōkataina Caldera. The Ōkāreka Embayment and the Tarawera Volcanic Complex were placed inside the Haroharo Caldera which in turn is inside the Okataina Ring Structure, according to Newhall (1988), but this was reclassified by Cole (2009).
  - Ōkataina Caldera, size: roughly 27 x 20 km 38°13′S 176°30′E
    - Haroharo volcanic complex, northern end of the Okataina Volcanic Centre with infilling of several sub-caldera's from caldera forming eruptions:
      - Rotoiti Caldera
      - Matahina Caldera
      - Utu Caldera
      - Mount Tarawera and Tarawera volcanic complex 38°13′S 176°30′E
        - Okareka vent
      - Puhipuhi Embayment
      - Ōkareka Embayment 38°12′08″S 176°20′54″E
      - Rotomā Caldera 38°05′S 176°35′E
  - Lakes
    - Lake Ōkataina 38°07′S 176°25′E
    - Lake Tarawera 38°12′S 176°27′E
    - Lake Rotokākahi (Green Lake) 38°13′S 176°20′E
    - Lake Tikitapu (Blue Lake) 38°12′S 176°20′E
    - Lake Ōkāreka 38°10′S 176°22′E
    - Lake Rotomahana 38°16′S 176°27′E
    - Lake Rotoiti 38°02′20″S 176°25′40″E
    - Lake Rotomā 38°02′51″S 176°35′16″E
    - Lake Rotoehu 38°1′S 176°32′E
  - Geothermal fields
    - Waimangu Volcanic Rift Valley 38°16′57″S 176°23′56″E
      - Frying Pan Lake 38°17′01″S 176°23′42″E
- Maroa Volcanic Centre: The Maroa Caldera formed in the north-east corner of the Whakamaru Caldera, and the Whakamaru Caldera partially overlaps with the Taupō Caldera on the South. The Waikato River course follows roughly the northern Maroa Caldera rim on one side. The town of Whakamaru and the artificial Lake Whakamaru, on the Waikato River, have the same name too. The paired single event eruption of the Ohakuri Caldera at its north western limits with the Rotorua Caldera added later complexity after this classification was developed. Accordingly, later naming, terms this the Whakamaru caldera complex.
  - Ohakuri Caldera 38°22′41″S 176°01′08″E
  - Maroa Caldera, size: 16 x 25 km 38°25′S 176°05′E
    - Puketarata volcanic complex 38°33′02″S 176°03′16″E
  - Reporoa Caldera, size: 10 x 15 km 38°25′S 176°20′E
  - Whakamaru Caldera, size: 30 x 40 km 38.42°S 175.80°E
  - Geothermal fields
    - Waiotapu 38°21′34″S 176°22′11″E
    - Wairakei 38°37′36″S 176°06′13″E
      - Craters of the Moon (Karapiti) 38°38.8′S 176°4.1′E
    - Orakei Korako 38°28′24″S 176°8′54″E
    - Ngatamariki 38°32′50″S 176°11′45″E
    - Rotokaua 38.627975°S 176.192191°E
    - Ohaaki Power Station 38°31′37″S 176°17′31″E
- Taupō Volcanic Centre
  - Taupō Caldera, size: roughly 35 km wide 38°49′S 176°00′E
    - Mount Tauhara 38°41′40″S 176°9′46″E
  - Ben Lomond rhyolite dome (contains obsidian) 38°35.7′S 175°57.2′E
  - Lake Taupō 38°49′S 176°00′E
    - Horomatangi Reefs 38.8°S 176.00°E
    - Motutaiko Island 38.854°S 175.942°E
  - Geothermal fields
    - Tauhara-Taupō 38.967863°S 175.763380°E
- Tongariro Volcanic Centre: Lake Taupō, Kakaramea, Pihanga, Tongariro and Ruapehu are roughly aligned on the main fault.
  - Kakaramea-Tihia Massif 38°59′20″S 175°42′30″E
  - Pihanga 39°02′28.75″S 175°46′7″E
  - Mount Tongariro and Tongariro volcanic complex 39°8′S 175°39′E
    - Mount Ngauruhoe, a main Tongariro vent 39°9′24.6″S 175°37′55.8″E
    - Tama crater lakes, main Tongariro vents
      - Upper Tama 39°11′07″S 175°37′20″E
      - Lower Tama 39°12′09″S 175°36′24″E
  - Mount Ruapehu 39°11′S 175°21′E
    - Hauhungatahi 39°14′S 175°26′E
  - Lakes
    - Lake Rotoaira 39°03′16″S 175°42′51″E
    - Lake Rotopounamu 39°01′36″S 175°44′18″E
  - Geothermal fields
    - Ketetahi Springs 39°06′27″S 175°38′52″E
- Mangakino Volcanic Centre: The Mangakino Volcanic Centre is the westernmost extinct rhyolitic caldera volcano in the Taupō Volcanic Zone and activity commenced at least 1.62 million years ago. The course of the Waikato River crosses this area, between the artificial Lake Ohakuri (38°25′22″S 176°07′32″E), the town of Mangakino (38°23′S 175°47′E) and Hamilton.
  - Artificial Lake Maraetai

Other important features of the TVZ include the Ngakuru and Ruapehu grabens.

=== Note ===
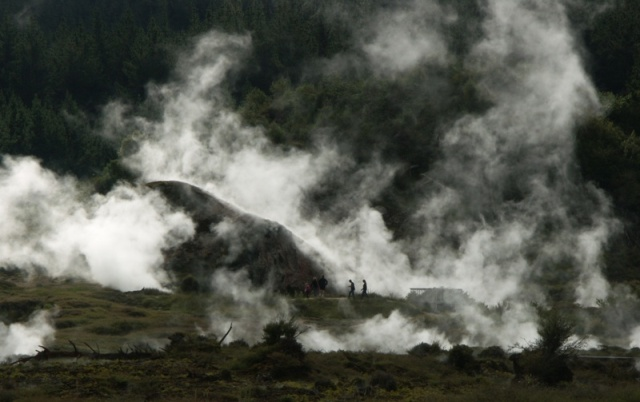
Craters of the Moon geothermal area

There is more recent, somewhat different classification, by some of the same authors, that uses the term caldera complex:

- North part: Whakatane Graben – Bay of Plenty
- Central part:
  - West of the main fault zone:
    - Mangakino caldera complex; may be transitional between Coromandel Volcanic Zone (CVZ) and Taupō Volcanic Zone (TVZ) (1.62 – 0.91 mio. years old)
    - Kapenga caldera; lies between the Maroa caldera and the Rotorua caldera, it is completely buried under more recent tephra (circa 700,000 years old)
      - Ōkāreka Embayment, lies inside the northern end of the Kapenga caldera, but is now usually regarded as part of the recently active Okataina caldera complex
    - Rotorua single event caldera; Mamaku Ignimbrite (circa 225,000 years old)
  - Main fault zone:
    - Ōkataina caldera complex
      - Haroharo caldera complex
      - Tarawera volcanic complex
    - Whakamaru caldera complex
      - Maroa caldera
    - Ohakuri single event caldera
    - Taupō caldera complex
  - East of the main fault zone:
    - Reporoa single event caldera; Kaingaroa Ignimbrite (circa 240,000 years old)
- South part: Tongariro Volcanic Centre
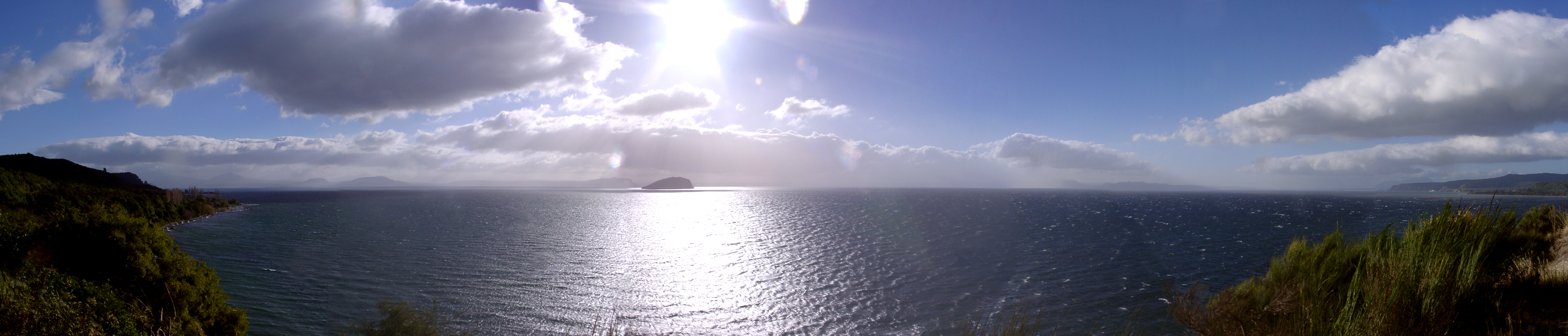
Panorama across Lake Taupō

== See also ==
- Geology of New Zealand
- Geothermal areas in New Zealand
- Geothermal power in New Zealand
- List of volcanoes in New Zealand
- North Island Volcanic Plateau – Pyroclastic volcanic plateau on the North Island of New Zealand
- Rotorua Caldera
- Taupō Volcano
- Volcanology of New Zealand
