= Ngakuru Graben =

Geological feature in the North Island of New Zealand

- Whirinaki Valley
- Location within New Zealand Location within North Island
- Length: 19 km (12 mi) approximately
- Width: (4.5 km (2.8 mi)) 15 km (9.3 mi) Much current work as of 2022 refers to wider width

Geology
- Type: intra-rift garben
- Age: 61,000 years

Geography
- Location: North Island
- Country: New Zealand
- State/Province: Waikato
- Coordinates: 38°19′05″S 176°12′29″E
- River: Totara Stream, Rehi Stream, Whirinaki Stream, Rotohouhou Stream
- Interactive map of Ngakuru Graben

The Ngakuru Graben is an area of tectonic ground subsiding as originally defined between the Ngakuru Fault to the east and the Whirinaki Fault in the west both in the Taupō Fault Belt. It was originally defined in 1959 but many other geological terms for local features are no longer in use, and some were misinterpretations. Within this 4.5 km (2.8 mi) wide Ngakuru Graben are also to the west the Maleme Fault (Zone), which as a zone also contains the Mangaete/Lakeside Fault and to the east the Hossack Road Fault and the Te Weta Fault. Some authors have defined a wider 15 km (9.3 mi) wide area so as to include all of the low-lying areas associated with the Taupō Fault Belt immediately south of Rotorua so this includes the more eastern Paeroa and Ngapouri Faults and much of the Kapenga Caldera. Unhappily both definitions as to width seem current in the literature.

The tectonic activity is driven by the ground subsiding at a rate of 3–4 mm/yr since 61,000 years ago with largely orthogonal rifting associated with subduction and the clockwise rotation of the northern North Island allowing the rift to open.
