= Lake Rotorua =

Lake in the North Island of New Zealand

- Māori: Te Rotorua nui ā Kahumatamomoe
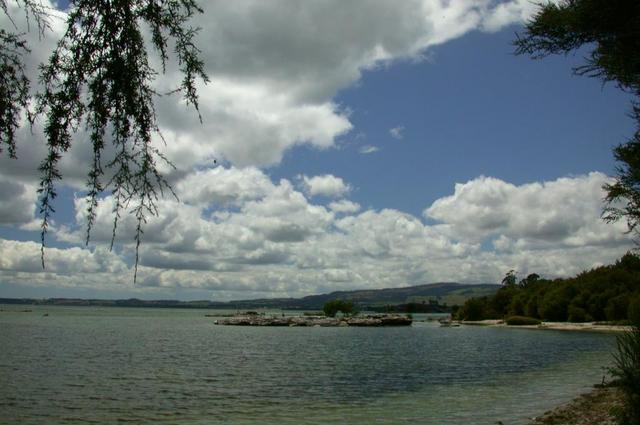
- Lake Rotorua
- Interactive map of Lake Rotorua
- Location: Rotorua Lakes, Bay of Plenty Region, North Island
- Coordinates: 38°05′S 176°16′E
- Type: crater lake
- Primary inflows: Utuhina, Hamurana Spring, Ngongotahā
- Primary outflows: Ohau Channel
- Basin countries: New Zealand
- Max. length: 12.1 kilometres (7.5 mi)
- Max. width: 9.7 kilometres (6.0 mi)
- Surface area: 79.8 square kilometres (30.8 sq mi)
- Average depth: 10 metres (33 ft)
- Max. depth: 45 metres (148 ft)
- Surface elevation: 280 metres (920 ft)
- Islands: Mokoia Island
- Settlements: Rotorua Hamurana Mourea

Lake Rotorua (Māori: Te Rotorua nui ā Kahumatamomoe) is the second largest lake in the North Island of New Zealand by surface area, covering 79.8 km^{2}. It has a mean depth of just 10 metres and a considerably smaller volume of water than nearby Lake Tarawera. It sits within the Rotorua Caldera in the Bay of Plenty Region.

== Geography ==
Lake Rotorua is fed with water from a number of rivers and streams. Some, such as the Utuhina, carry water that is warmer than the lake, due to thermal activity in the Rotorua area. Conversely, streams on the northern shore, such as the Hamurana Spring and the Awahou stream, have crystal clear water with a constant temperature of 10 degrees Celsius. Other notable tributaries include the Ngongotahā stream, famous for trout fishing. Lake Rotorua flows directly into Lake Rotoiti via the Ohau Channel at the north-eastern corner of the lake. The urban development of Rotorua city extends along the south portion of the lake shore.

=== Geology ===
The lake sits in the crater of a large volcano in the Taupō Volcanic Zone. The volcano's last major eruption was about 240,000 years ago. After the eruption, the magma chamber beneath it collapsed. The circular depression left behind is the Rotorua Caldera, which is the site of the lake.

The lake, as shown in Figure 1, has had periods at various surface levels since the caldera's Mamaku ignimbrite eruption, related to both volcanic activity and subsidence within the Taupō Rift. The lake's all-time high occurred sometime after the formation of the Ngongotahā Dome, which records this on its flanks, and is now dated at 200,000 years. Previously this dome's eruption was assigned much closer to the time of the Mamaku ignimbrite eruption, so the lake maximum high stand was assumed to be more directly related to the caldera's formation. Breakout floods are suspected through the Hemo Gorge after the lake's maximum high stand, definitely after the Rotoiti eruption of the Ōkataina Caldera, with formation of a channel within the western lake floor of Lake Rotoiti, and suspected after the Hauparu eruption through the Kaituna River Gorge. Several other lakes of volcanic origin are nearby to the east, around the base of the active volcano Mount Tarawera, and these have also varied in size or existence over time due to volcanic action.

Mokoia Island, close to the centre of the lake, is a much later rhyolite dome than Ngongotahā. It is probably New Zealand's best-known lake island, and is closely associated with one of the best-known Māori legends, that of Hinemoa and Tutanekai. Is said that Hinemoa swam across the lake to her lover Tutanekai, who lived on Mokoia Island.

Owing to the geothermal activity around the lake (including still active geysers and hot mud pools), the lake has a high sulphur content. This gives the lake's waters an unusual yellowish-green hue.

=== Mapping of lake floor ===
In 2024, maps of the lake floor were published, showing the results of surveys carried out in 2016 and 2017. The maps reveal the course of an ancient river, now submerged, and thousands of pockmarks that probably result from the emission of gas from decomposition of organic material beneath the lake floor. The surveys also revealed significant geothermal activity extending around 1 km (0.62 mi) into the lake from Sulphur Point.

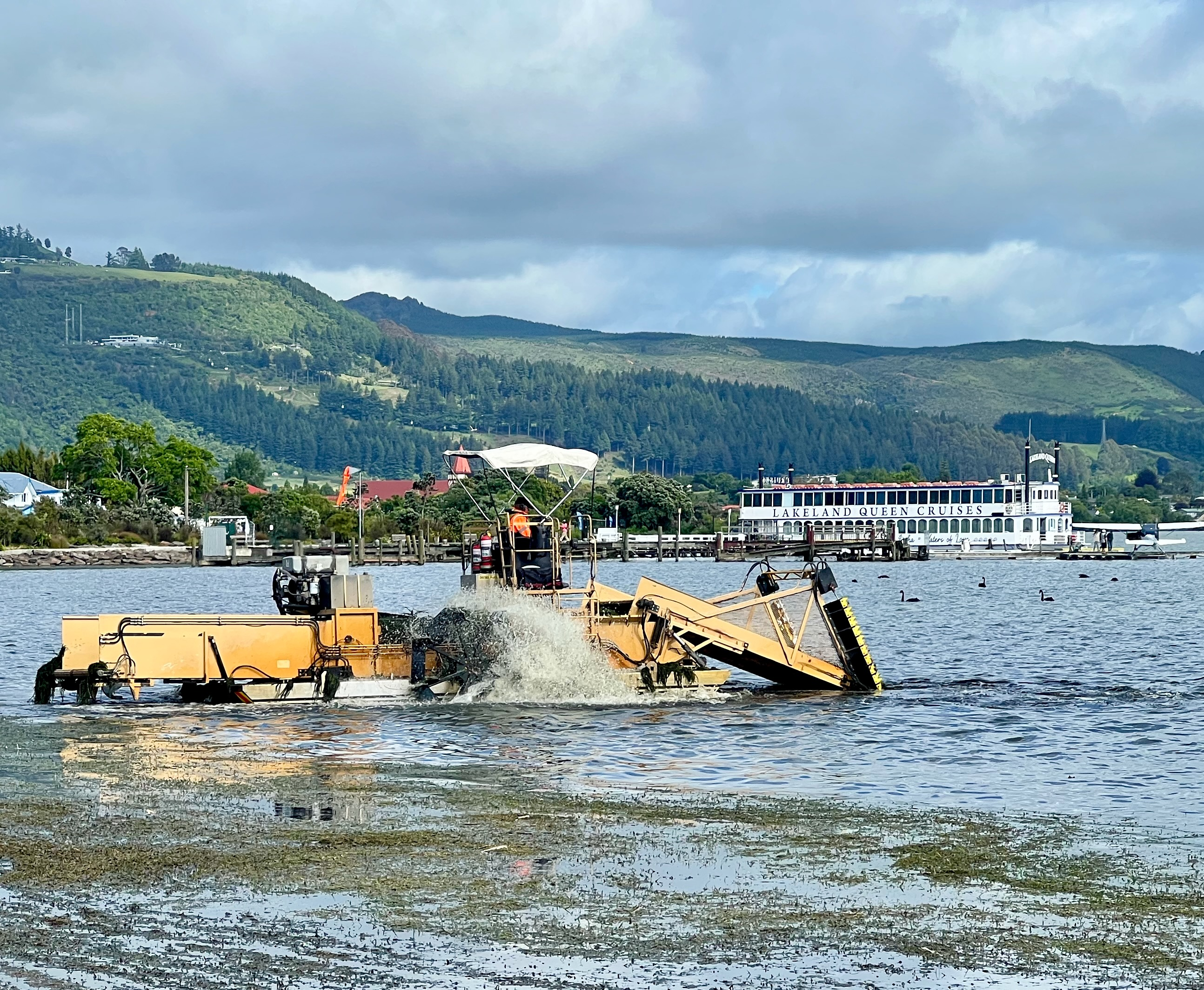
Weed cutter off Ohinemutu in 2025

=== Pollution ===
NIWA estimated that livestock farming around the lake adds over 650 tonnes of nitrogen a year, resulting in algal blooms and weed growth. Thus the lake's water quality is poor, with a Trophic level index between 4 and 5 (eutrophic). It takes about 60 years for inflowing nutrient-laden groundwater to reach the lake, so that restoration of the lake is likely to be slow, even if a target of 435 tonnes of annual nitrogen input is reached. Alum dosing of two tributaries reduces phosphorus levels and rules aim to reduce nitrogen inputs from the catchment and extend sewers to reduce septic tank inputs. In the 1960s it was noticed there had been a decline in kākahi and koura and an increase in invasive aquatic plants, mainly hornwort (Ceratophyllum demersum), Lagarosiphon major, Egeria densa and Elodea canadensis. Herbicides and mechanised weed cutters are used to control the weeds, sometimes resulting in complaints about smells. Annual weed removal reduces nitrogen levels in the lake. A storm in 2025 blew weed onto the lake shore near the town, requiring removal of about 725 tonnes.

== Tourist attraction ==
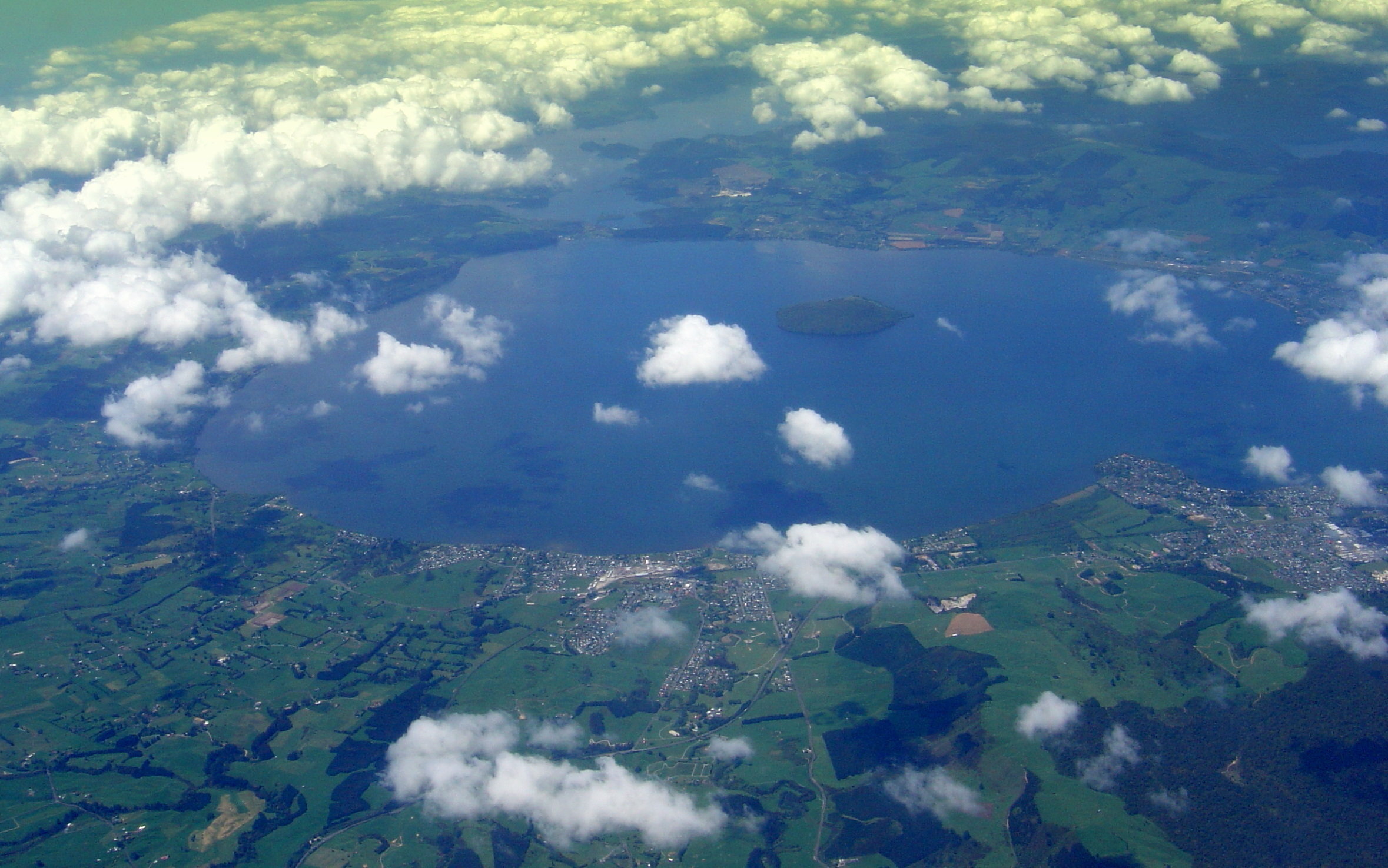
Lake Rotorua from the air

Despite the large volume of water flowing through the lake, its shallow depth makes it very prone to discolouration, especially from sediment following windy weather. It is well used by fishermen, but less popular with watersports participants and swimmers.

The Ohau Channel is navigable by boat and is also favoured by fly fishermen. The Ohau channel joins at the Mourea delta, an area with very low water levels. This area is frequented by novice kayakers and swimmers. Nearby is the ancestral land of the Ngāti Pikiao hapū of the Te Arawa tribe. From Lake Rotoiti the waters of Lake Rotorua flow to the Kaituna River and into the Pacific Ocean near Maketu; the rapid descent from over 900 feet above sea level in less than 20 km has created an area used for extreme kayaking and white water rafting.

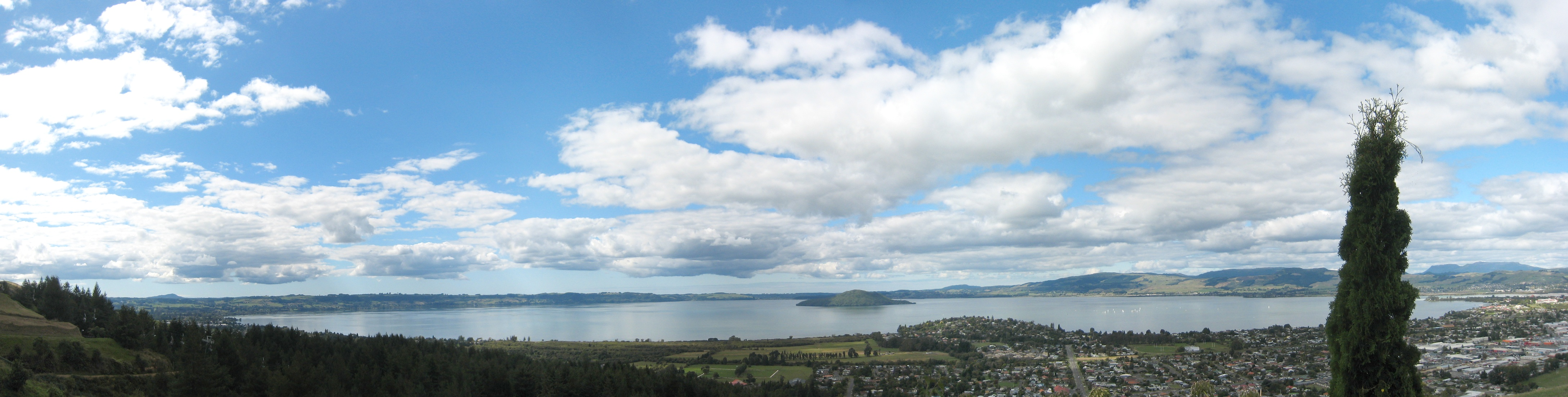
Panoramic view of Lake Rotorua from Mount Ngongotahā

== Water transport ==
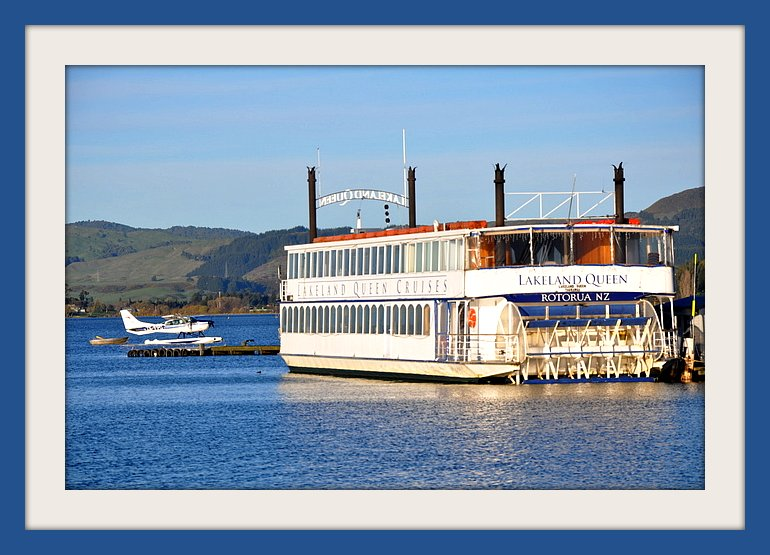
Lakeland Queen stern-wheel paddler

Waka were used between settlements on the shores of the lake and to Mokoia Island. They could reach the coast by portage across narrow necks of land between lakes and by river to Maketu. In 1871 a 27 feet (8.2 m) yacht was built at Te Ngae for excursions and the first boat launched from Ohinemutu on 3 November 1877 was the 28 ft (8.5 m) Bessie Bell, which could take up to 30 passengers. Boats carried potatoes, sulphur timber and other goods. In June 1901 local boat builders Boord and MacDonald of the Hot Lakes Steam Navigation Company (HLSNC) launched the Hamurana, an 80 feet (24 m) steamship. Her draft was too great to approach wharves when the lake was low and she couldn’t get through the Ohau Channel to Rotoiti. She sank in 1903, but was refloated and was finally scrapped in 1932. By 1906, when the Rotorua Motor Launch Company went bankrupt, it had rowing boats and five launches. In 1908 the Rotorua Ferry Co. Ltd (formerly HLSNC) offered daily trips by oil launches and steamers to scenic spots, hired out launches for fishing parties and provided a house boat at the fishing grounds. Boat ramps and jetties were administered by Lands and Survey, until transferred to the City Council in 1968.

Other launches on the lake have included Wynona (1948) and Ngaroto (built 1955 and refurbished in 2007 to use at Queenstown).

=== Lakeland Queen ===
Lakeland Queen is a sternwheeler passenger vessel that operates cruises on Lake Rotorua. She was built in Rotorua in 1986 by brothers Ian and Doug Stewart of the company Lakeland Steel Products, in the style of the historic Mississippi paddle steamers. Lakeland Queen was launched on 26 October 1986, and is the only sternwheeler passenger vessel in New Zealand. Lakeland Queen is used for breakfast, lunch and dinner cruises and sightseeing. Māori cultural entertainment has been provided on some cruises. The cruises often have live music, with Blues Cruises a regular feature.

== See also ==
- Lakes of New Zealand
- List of lakes in New Zealand
