= Sophia Hinerangi =

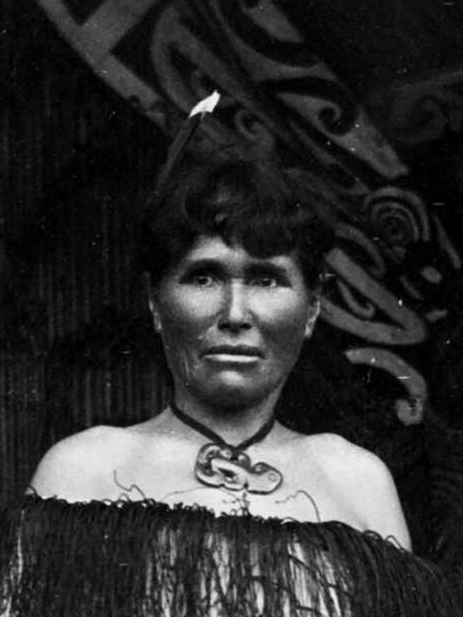
- Born: circa 1830; Russell, New Zealand
- Died: 4 December 1911; Whakarewarewa, New Zealand
- Other names: Mary Sophia Gray, Tepaea
- Occupation: business woman
- Known for: tourist guide and cultural programming, temperance leader
- Relatives: Lucy Takiora Lord (half-sister)

Sophia Hinerangi (c. 1834–4 December 1911) was a New Zealand tourist guide and temperance leader. Of Māori descent, she identified with the Ngāti Ruanui iwi.

== Early life ==
She was born in Russell, Northland, New Zealand c. 1834 to a Māori mother (Kōtiro Hinerangi, of Ngāti Ruanui from Taranaki) and a Scottish father (Alexander Grey or Gray). She was baptised Mary Sophia Gray in 1839, and it is believed that she left home to be raised by Anglican missionary Charlotte Kemp at the Kerikeri Mission House then sent to school at the Wesleyan Native Institution at Three Kings in Auckland. She married twice, her first was sometime in 1851, to a Māori Chief Te Hākiro Koroneho (Baptised Colenso) with whom she had 14 children. She married for the second time in 1870 to Hōri Taiāwhio and moved to Te Wairoa where they had three children together.

== Entrepreneurism and tourism ==
Especially since 1870 with the visit to New Zealand by Prince Alfred, Duke of Edinburgh, the popularity of tourists visiting ideal locations such as the Lake Country of the Waikato grew. Local Māori leaders developed tourism industries alongside public accommodations and eventually allowed for surveys by railway companies to increase tourist traffic. For example, a reporter from Rotorua in 1885 proclaimed that while the Cambridge line of coaches was suitable for invalids coming to the hot springs and spas there, a national effort to extend a Rotorua Branch Railway was needed. He went on to explain that the Māori were busy building public accommodation houses at Whakarewarewa "where a more varied and extensive field for bathing opens out."

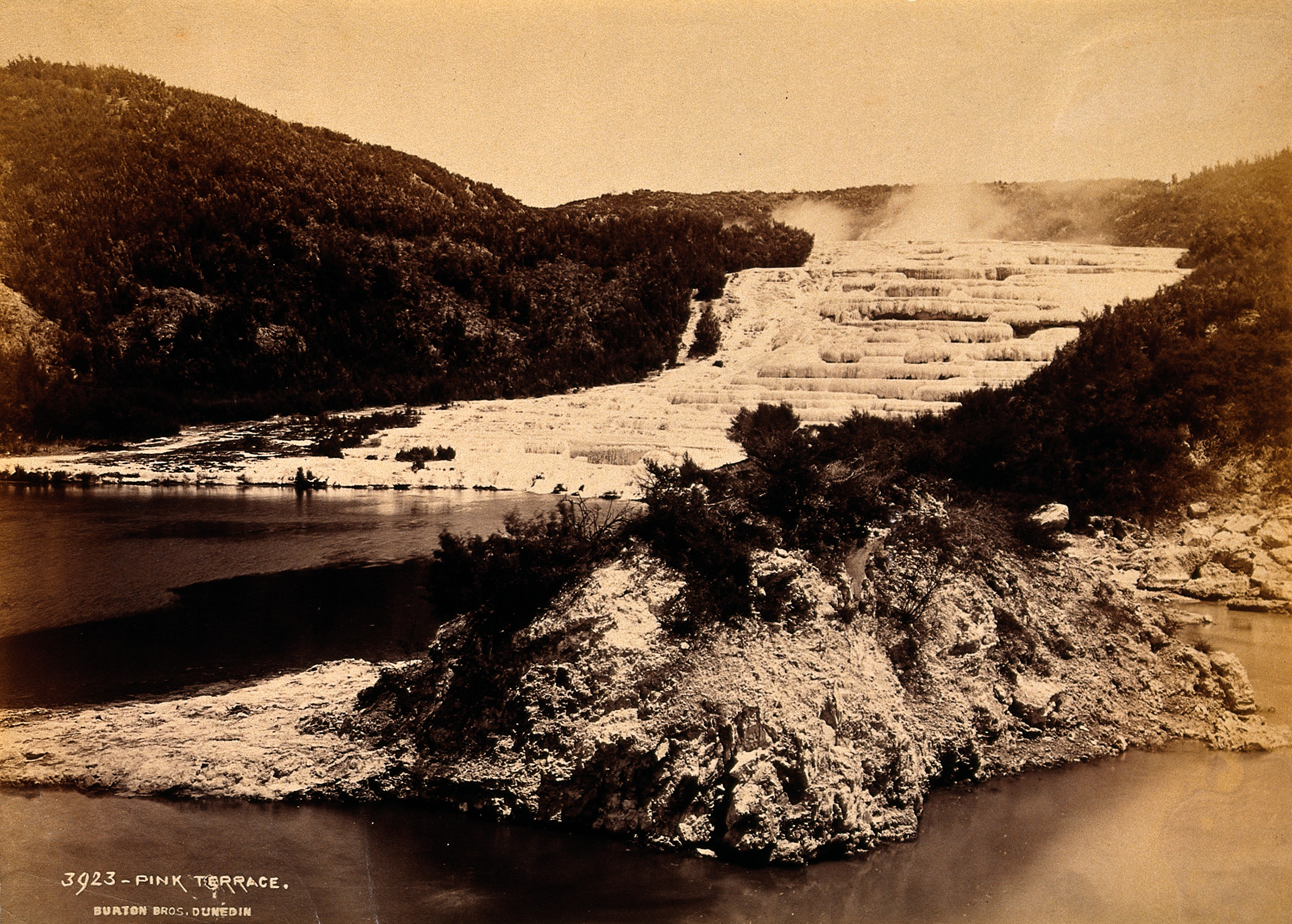
Pink Terrace, New Zealand: terraced thermal pools on the western edge of Lake Rotomahana

Hinerangi had become one of the most prominent guides of the Pink and White Terraces near Te Wairoa, New Zealand. She and another bilingual guide, Kate Middlemass, had been selected by the local hapū, the Tūhourangi, to handle the tours there. These most popular guides, traditionally women with much knowledge of local culture and geography, could receive 15 shillings from each tour party. Hinerangi organized the tours and settled accounts.

== Christian mission and temperance leader ==
She was involved with the missionary presence there, which by the time she arrived was growing under the guidance of the Wellesley Street Baptist Church in Auckland. Rev. Alfred Fairbrother, who was sent from England as missionary to Te Wairoa in 1882, was a controversial figure with some local people complaining to the church in Auckland about his brusque manners. Hinerangi was an important leader in the Baptist mission of Rev. Fairbrother since he would lead his church services in her house.

Mary Clement Leavitt, a World Woman Christian Temperance Union (WCTU) missionary, wrote a letter describing her interaction with Hinerangi, and why she agreed to wear the WCTU white ribbon badge along with the New Zealand blue ribbon badge. Leavitt wrote for the WCTU's Union Signal:

"Sophia, the Maori guide who conducted our party through these wonders, donned the blue before I left Wairoa, the native town nearest the spot. The blue ribbon is always offered, and generally donned, on taking the pledge here. I have sewed it underneath my own bit of white, and have advised all members of the unions I have formed to wear both, as a token that we are in homony with this gospel, total abstinence. After I had pinned the blue on Sophia, she asked me what the white was, and what it meant. I explained, and she said somewhat sadly, "Then I cannot put it on, for there in no union here." I said, 'Yes you shall have it, if you will take it in its deepest meaning, which is, I will live every day as Jesus wants me to. I will do nothing that will displease him and all that will please him'." "Can I do that?" she said more to herself than to me, and I answered, "Jesus will always help you." Sophia said, "Yes, yes, that is what Fairbrother says. Pin it on, I am not afraid." ... Sophia is a very influential woman in the tribe, reads and speaks English well. She was not a drunkard like many of these women but up to this time has failed to refuse when urged by tourists to take a little drink when tired, or wet, or cold, and sometimes the little has produced bad results. It is most painful to consider the evil effects produced by tourists giving money to the natives for dancing the old pagan, lascivious Haka, and also giving drink. All Mr. Fairbrother's efforts are weakened, some entirely defeated in this way. For example, Mr. Fairbrother had asked me to speak to the people, himself interpreting, had visited each wharie (house) and all had promised to come. Three hours before the appointed time, a party of tourists arrived, offered money for a dance, and all the young men and women, all the drinkers, all except the real Christians and children too young for the dance went to the building where these gatherings take place."

This interaction with Leavitt probably cemented Hinerangi's role in championing the temperance mission in this area. In 1896 a report by Annie Jane Schnackenberg, Superintendent of the WCTU-NZ department of Maori Missions, in The White Ribbon lists Hinerangi ("Sophia, the well-known guide") as president of the Whakarewarewa Union. Hinerangi might have started the branch earlier, since the report mentioned that the Union was growing and in 1896 currently boasted 30 members. Others in the Union chapter listed were Herena Taupopoki, Vice-president; Isabella Thomas, secretary; Annie Walker, treasurer - with superintendents leading the following departments: social purity, Sunday school, Band of Hope, sewing class, and Bible class. Schnackenberg quoted Hinerangi as saying: "I don't know which is the greater work, Sabbath observance or Temperance. Before Mrs. Hewitt came here and told us about your society, we had no Sabbath and everybody drank. Now the Sabbath is a holy day with us, and, with one or two exceptions, all our women are abstainers."

The WCTU Pledge that Hinerangi would have taken and offered to others in Māori read as follows:

He whakaae tenei naku kia kaua ahau e kai tupeka, e inu ranei i tetahi mea e haurangi ai te tangata, kia kaua hoki ahau e whakaae ki te tamoko. Ma te Atua ahau e awhina. (Translated in English as follows: I agree not to smoke or drink anything that makes people drunk, and I do not approve of smoking. God help me.

== Prediction of and eruption of Tarawera, 1886 ==
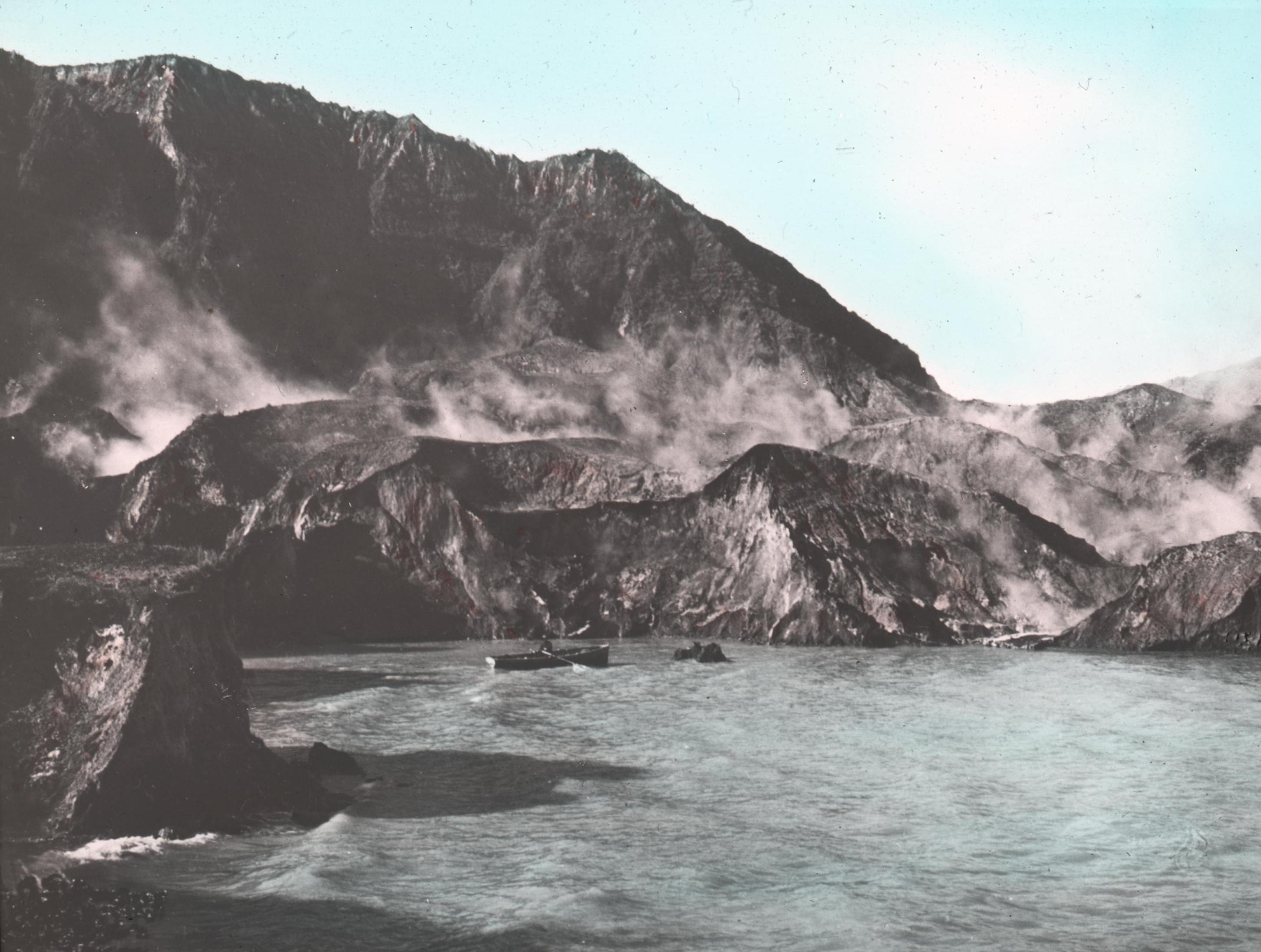
Lake Rotomohana at the foot of the volcano of Tarawera after the 1886 eruption

In late May 1886, while Hinerangi was leading a tour group along Lake Tarawera, the waters receded then rose up again accompanied by a strange sound. She told the local Tohunga that they then saw a waka with ghostly men that vanished as it came toward them - the elder explained that this was a sign that their ancestors were angry for the way the land was being abused by the tourists. On the night of the eruption of Mount Tarawera on 10 June, over 60 people took shelter in Hinerangi's home at Te Wairoa. Because of its high-pitched roof and reinforced timber walls, everyone in her house escaped being killed.

With their homes and gardens buried in volcanic ash, all the displaced Tūhourangi people moved to the nearby village of Whakarewarewa (under the care of the Ngāti Wāhiao). There she continued to organize and lead the local tours, and she encouraged other women there to become guides. In 1895 Hinerangi toured Australia as part of a theatrical performance about the eruption, and in 1896 was appointed official Caretaker of Whakarewarewa.

== Death and legacy ==
Hinerangi died at Whakarewarewa on 4 December 1911.

Rotorua’s tribute to her is Sophia Street.

Hinerangi was also known under the name Te Paea.

== Additional resources ==
- Bremner, Hamish (2004). Constructing, Contesting and Consuming New Zealand's Tourism Landscape: A History of Te Wairoa (PDF) (PhD). Auckland University of Technology.
- Dennan, Rangitiaria (1968). Guide Rangi of Rotorua. Christchurch, NZ: Witcombe & Tombs.
- Rei, Tania; Rangiheuea, Rea (1993). Else, Anne (ed.). The Guides of Whakarewarewa 1880s-. Wellington, NZ: Historical Branch, Department of Internal Affairs. Daphne Brasell Associates Press. pp. 18–20.
- Te Awekōtuku, Ngāhuia (1981). The Sociocultural Impact of Tourism on the Te Arawa People of Rotorua (PhD). Waikato University.
- Waaka, Peter Kuru Stanley (1982). Whakarewarewa: The Growth of a Māori Village (MA). University of Auckland.
