= Lucy Takiora Lord =

Guide, interpreter (1842–1893)

- Born: 9 October 1842; Russell, Northland, New Zealand
- Died: 3 September 1893 (aged 50); New Plymouth
- Other names: Louisa Grey, Lucy Elizabeth, Takiora Grey, Bloody Mary, Mrs Blake, Lucy D'Alton
- Occupations: Guide, Interpreter
- Spouses: Te Mahuki (m. 1860; died 1866); Joseph Edwin Dalton (m. 1878)
- Relatives: Sophia Hinerangi (half-sister); Nicola Kawana (relative)

Lucy Takiora Lord (9 October 1842 – 3 September 1893) was a New Zealand guide and interpreter. She is known for her role as an interpreter between Māori peoples and English colonizers. She is considered a controversial figure due to her assistance in the selling of Māori land to Pākehā.

== Biography ==
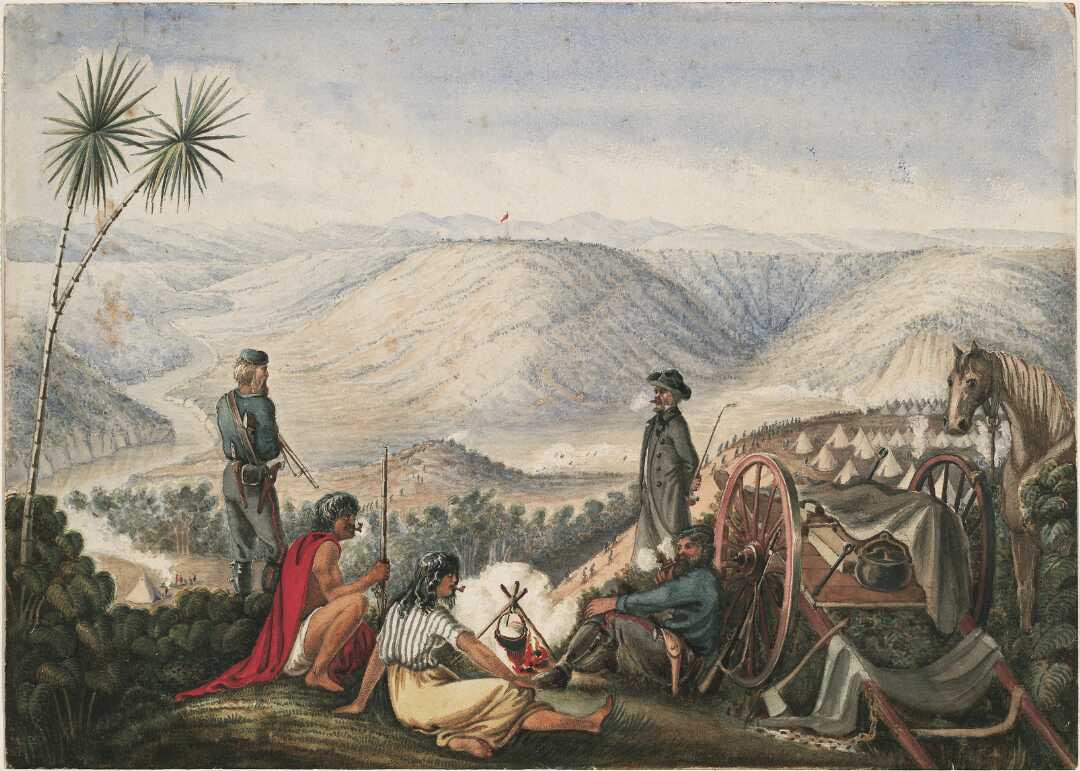
Watercolour by Gustavus von Tempsky. Lucy Takiora Lord is in the foreground.

She was born in Russell, Northland, New Zealand on 9 October 1842. She was the daughter of the Māori Kotiro Hinerangi and the English shop owner William Lord. Lord, alongside her first husband, Te Mahuki, were known as guides and interpreters for Gustavus von Tempsky and British troops during the New Zealand Wars in the 1860s. Later, she acted as an interpreter during land purchases of Māori land.

Throughout her life she was known by many names including Louisa Grey, Lucy Elizabeth, Takiora Grey, Bloody Mary, Mrs Blake and Lucy D'Alton.

She married Joseph Dalton in 1878 under the name Louisa Grey.

== Death and legacy ==
She died on 3 September 1893 at New Plymouth hospital.

In July 2021 a play called Kūpapa based on the life of Lucy Takiora Lord written by Nicola Kawana premiered. The play was presented by Te Pou Theatre in Auckland and directed by Erina Daniels.
