= Lake Rerewhakaaitu =

Lake in New Zealand

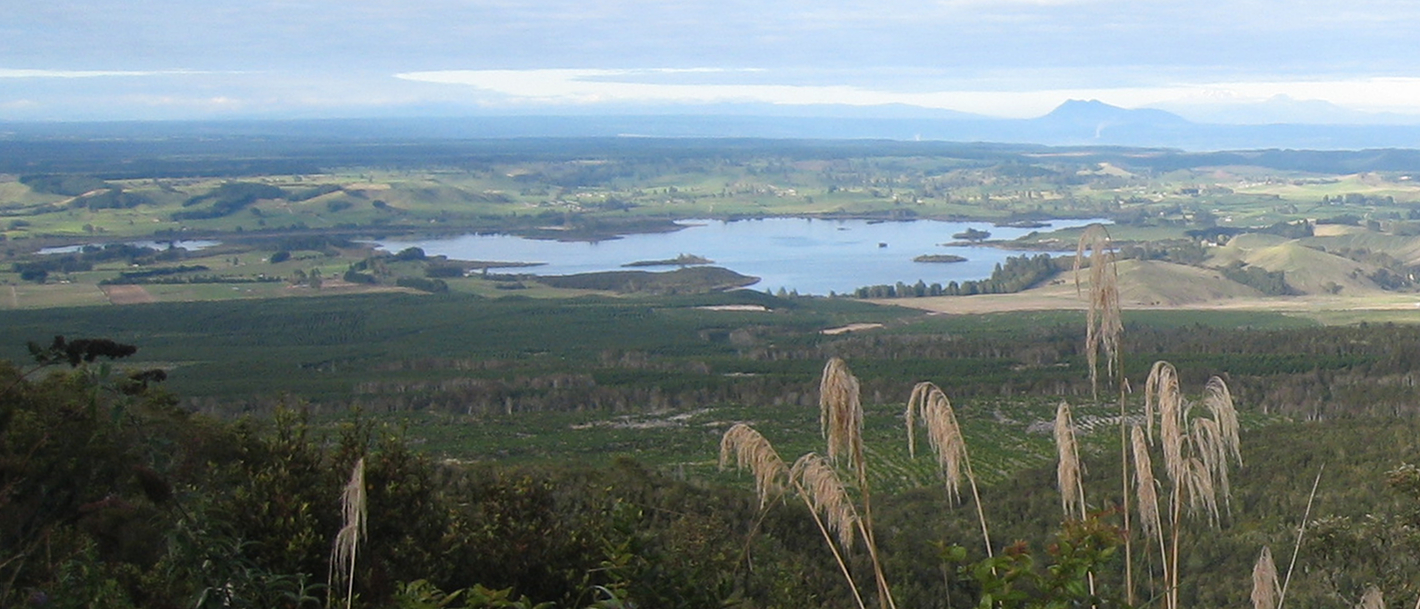
- View of the lake from Mount Tarawera

- Location within North Island
- Location: North Island
- Coordinates: 38°18′S 176°30′E
- Primary inflows: Awaroa and Mangakino Streams, subsurface
- Primary outflows: subsurface, surface water channel engineered to Rangitaiki River
- Catchment area: 3,700 ha (9,100 acres)
- Basin countries: New Zealand
- Max. length: 3.8 km (2.4 mi)
- Max. width: 3.7 km (2.3 mi)
- Surface area: 5.1 km^{2} (2.0 sq mi)
- Average depth: 6 m (20 ft)
- Max. depth: 18 m (59 ft)
- Surface elevation: 434.9 metres (1,427 ft)

Lake Rerewhakaaitu shortened to Lake Rere, is a small, shallow lake in northern New Zealand, located 30 kilometres to the east of Rotorua. It is immediately south of the active volcano Mount Tarawera, and the geography was substantially altered by the 1886 eruption of Mount Tarawera.

== Geography ==
At a mean autumn height of 434.9 metres (1,427 ft) above sea level the lake is highest and southernmost of the Rotorua Te Arawa lakes. Occupying a shallow basin, it is mostly surrounded by farming pasture; although over the past few decades, exotic and indigenous forest cover has begun to appear.

=== Water Flow ===
The lake is fed by the Awaroa and Mangakino Streams. The lake has no permanent outflow, as it is above the water table of much of the surrounding land (perched by perhaps up to 5 m (16 ft) except at north-eastern side), but has an artificial overflow channel to the south east to control the maximum height. Also, when the lake is high, water can flow down the Mangaharakeke Stream due to these water table issues. Further the Awaroa Stream is ephemeral.

It is believed that the springs at the head of Te Kauae Stream are sourced from the lake as part of 442 L/s (15.6 cu ft/s) ground water outflow from its catchment into that of Lake Rotomahana to its north-west. Groundwater also flows south-east of the lake into the Rangitaiki River catchment.

Inflow Sources Lake Rerewhakaaitu
Source	Inflow to lake
Mangakino Stream	12–16 L/s (0.42–0.57 cu ft/s)
Awaroa Stream	10 L/s (0.35 cu ft/s)
Catchment	1,658 L/s (58.6 cu ft/s)

=== Geology ===
The lake is believed to be about 11,000 years old, having formed after the Waiohau eruption of 14,009 ± 155 years ago. The area of the lake and its catchment has multiple rhyolitic pyroclastics from Mount Tarawera eruptions. Parts of the Whakamaru Group of ignimbrite define the south-east and parts of the northern lake shore, and that massive eruption sequence of the Whakamaru Caldera was about 335,000 years ago.

The 1886 eruption of Mount Tarawera covered the lake area in tephra to a depth between 15–5 cm (5.9–2.0 in). Some of the ash deposits in the catchment, particularly the even thicker ones to the north of the lake, would have been washed into the lake within a year or two as described at the time.

== Ecology ==
The lake is home to 46 different bird species with nine of these classified as threatened. This includes the largest breeding population of banded dotterel in the Rotorua Ecological District.

It is stocked with introduced rainbow trout.

The lake is classified as mesotrophic, with moderate productivity and water quality. Its trophic level index was 3.4 in 2014.

== Culture ==
The shores of the lake are often the scene of dog shows, like those from Rotorua, Agility during Easter, and the obedience show in January.

=== Education ===
Lake Rerewhakaaitu School is a co-educational state primary school for Year 1 to 8 students, with a roll of 63 as of March 2026.
