= Charles Blomfield (artist) =

British born New Zealand artist

- Born: 5 January 1848; London, England
- Died: 15 March 1926 (aged 78); Auckland, New Zealand
- Occupation: Artist
- Children: 7

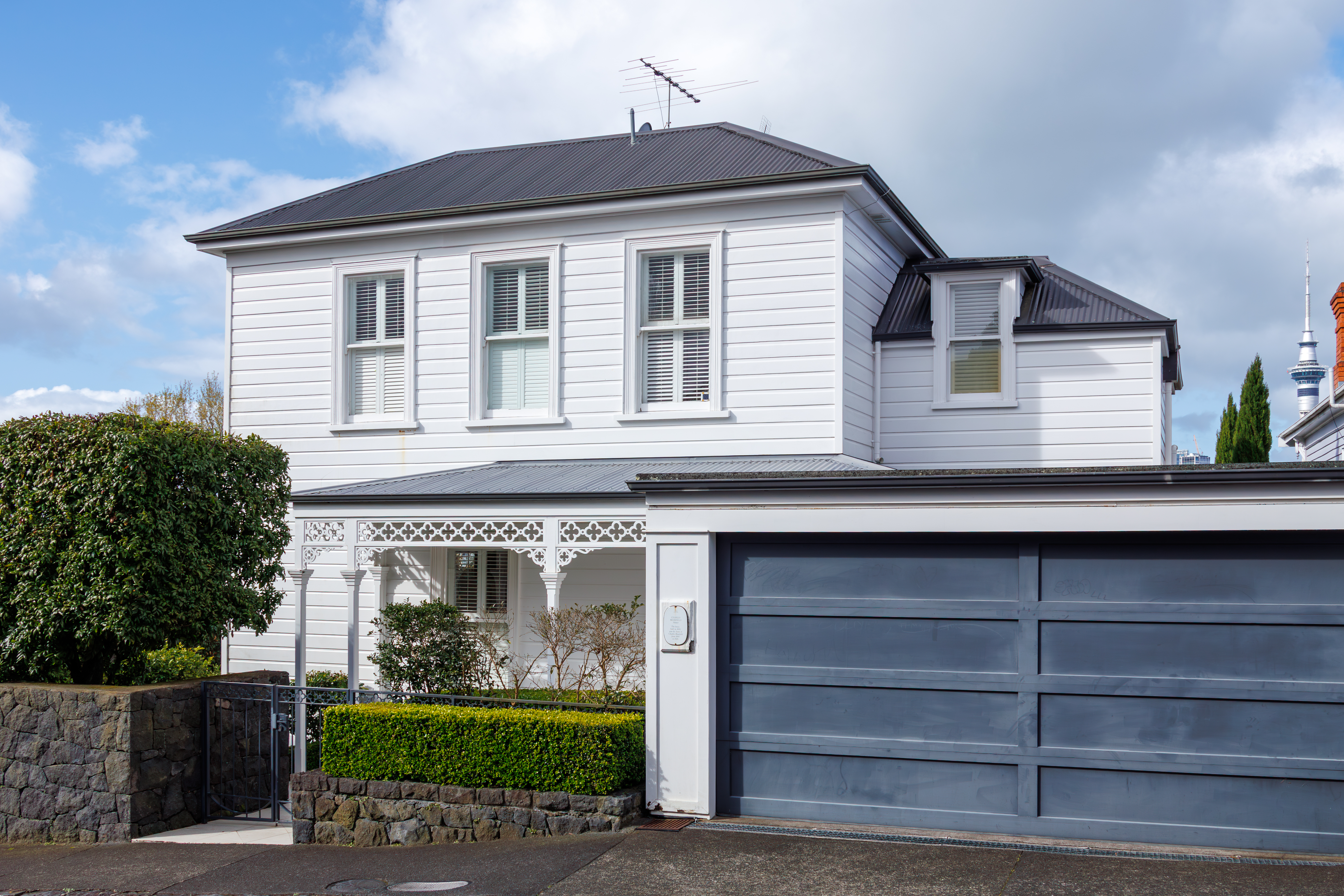
Charles Blomfield's house in Freemans Bay

Charles Blomfield (5 January 1848–15 March 1926) was an English-born artist who executed paintings of New Zealand landscapes, including the Pink and White Terraces, a notable natural feature that was later destroyed in the 1886 eruption of Tarawera.

== Biography ==
Charles Blomfield was born in London, England, on 5 January 1848 to William Blomfield, a cutler, and his wife Elizabeth Emily Hickman. The Blomfield family was a large one, with Charles being one of nine children. When he was nine years old, his father died. Now a widow, Blomfield's mother brought her family to New Zealand intending to settle in Northland as part of the Albertland settlement.

On arrival in Auckland in February 1863, the Blomfields decided not to proceed to Northland to become farmers, but to pursue urban trades in Auckland. The family remained in Auckland and many of the descendants of the children still reside in the Auckland area.

Blomfield lived at 40 Wood Street in Freeman's Bay, in a house built by his brother and allegedly made out of the timber from one large kauri tree. As well as an exhibiting easel painter, Blomfield worked as a sign-writer and interior decorator; for this trade he maintained studios in shops at various times. These were usually on Karangahape Road, one of these was shared with his daughter who made a living painting floral pieces which she also exhibited at the Auckland Society of Arts.

Blomfield travelled throughout the centre of the North Island on several occasions in the 1870s and 1880s creating many landscape paintings of the New Zealand countryside, often for sale to visitors to New Zealand. He was fortunate to view the famed Pink and White Terraces several times and paint them before they were lost in the eruption of Tarawera in 1886. Recent published research established their locations. His meticulous sketches and finished paintings are some of the main records of them. For the remainder of his life he was probably able to rely on new versions of his classic views of them to supplement his income.

He was unable to come to terms with developments in art and remained staunchly conservative and hostile to 'modern art'. In his later years he found himself increasingly sidelined by the artistic circles in Auckland, which he had previously shone in, and was probably embittered by this.

Blomfield was an elder of the Baptist Church and partly responsible for the construction of the Auckland Baptist Tabernacle on the city's main thoroughfare, Queen Street, which when it opened in 1886 was the largest building in the city and also contained the largest room. The ceiling of the auditorium of the Tabernacle is decorated with stencil work carried out by Charles and his brother Samuel. Another brother, William, was a noted newspaper cartoonist.

Blomfield died at his residence in Wood Street in 1926, survived by several children. He was buried at Hillsborough Cemetery. His paintings are widely regarded as the epitome of 19th century New Zealand landscape art, although his work, like many of his contemporaries, fell out of fashion during the 20th century, only to be re-evaluated in the 1970s.

=== Personal life ===
Blomfield married Ellen Wild in Auckland on 30 January 1874. The couple had seven children, one of whom, Elizabeth, became an artist.

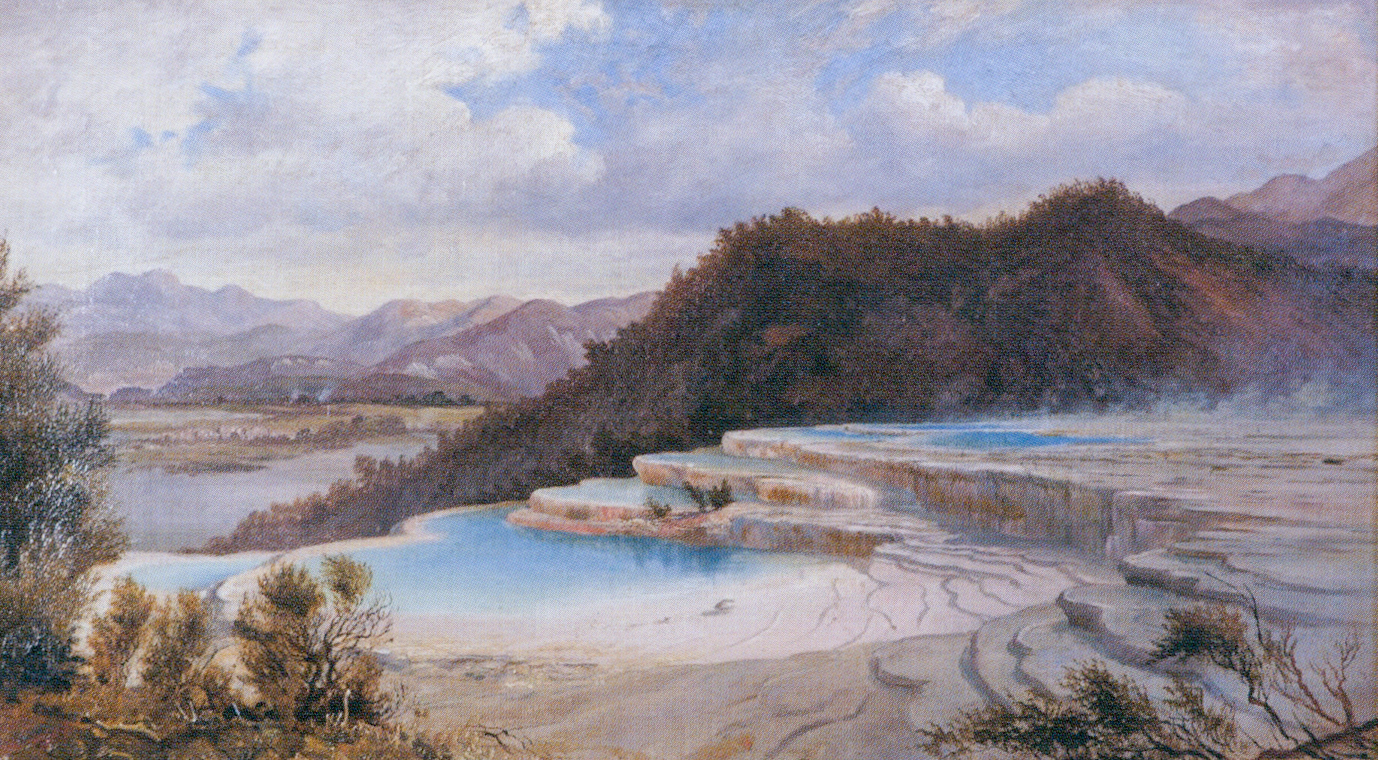
The Pink Terrace

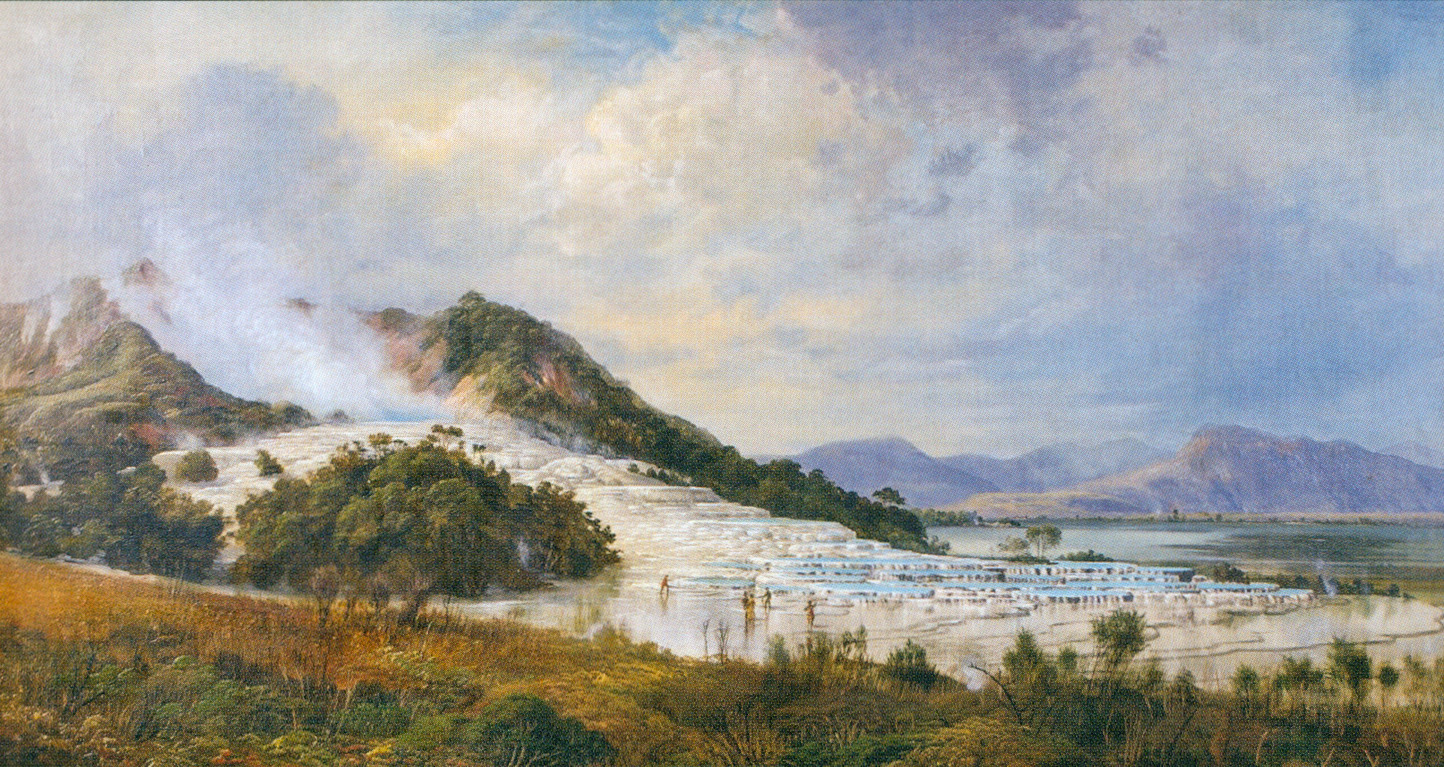
The White Terrace

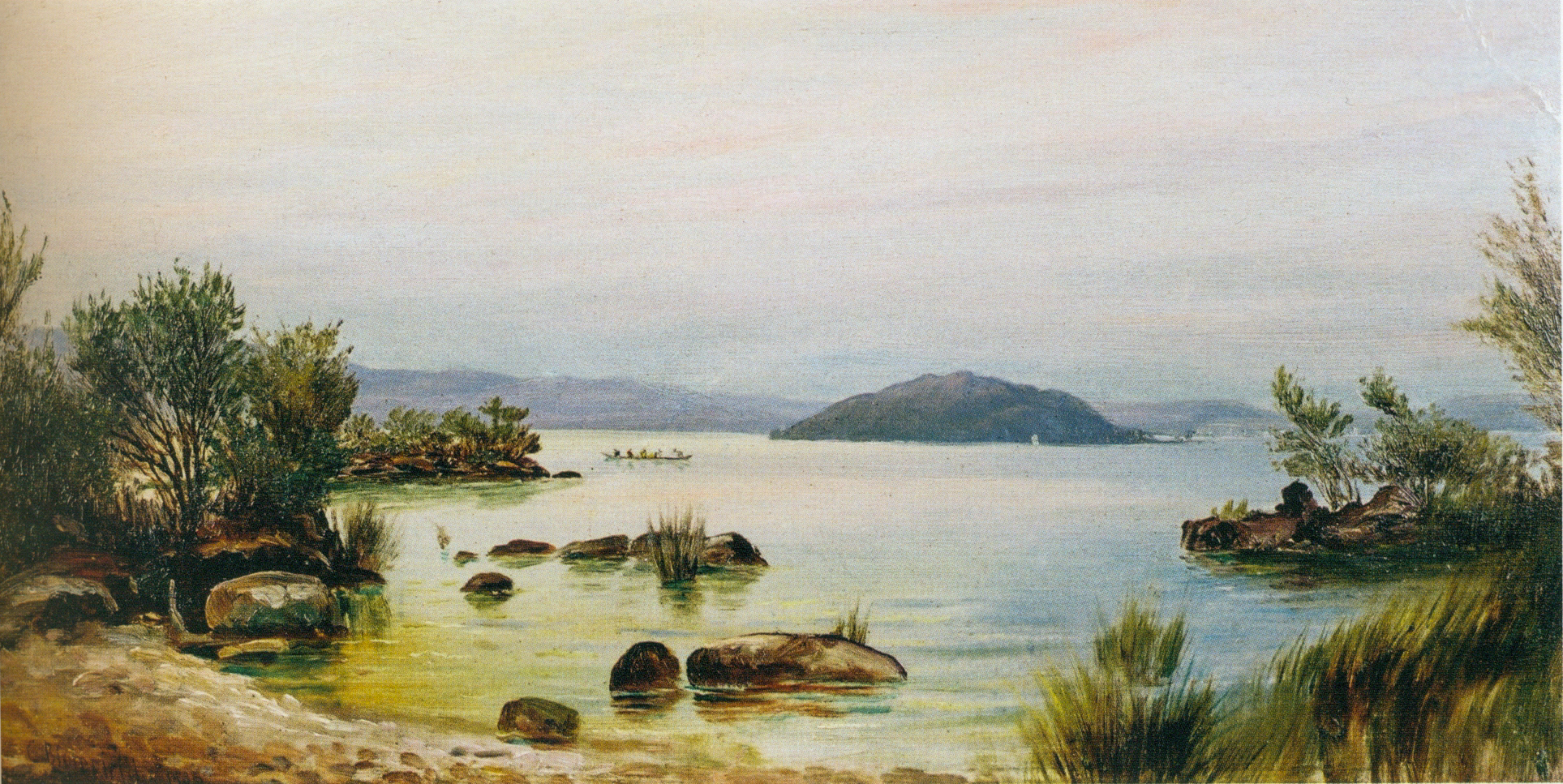
Lake Rotorua

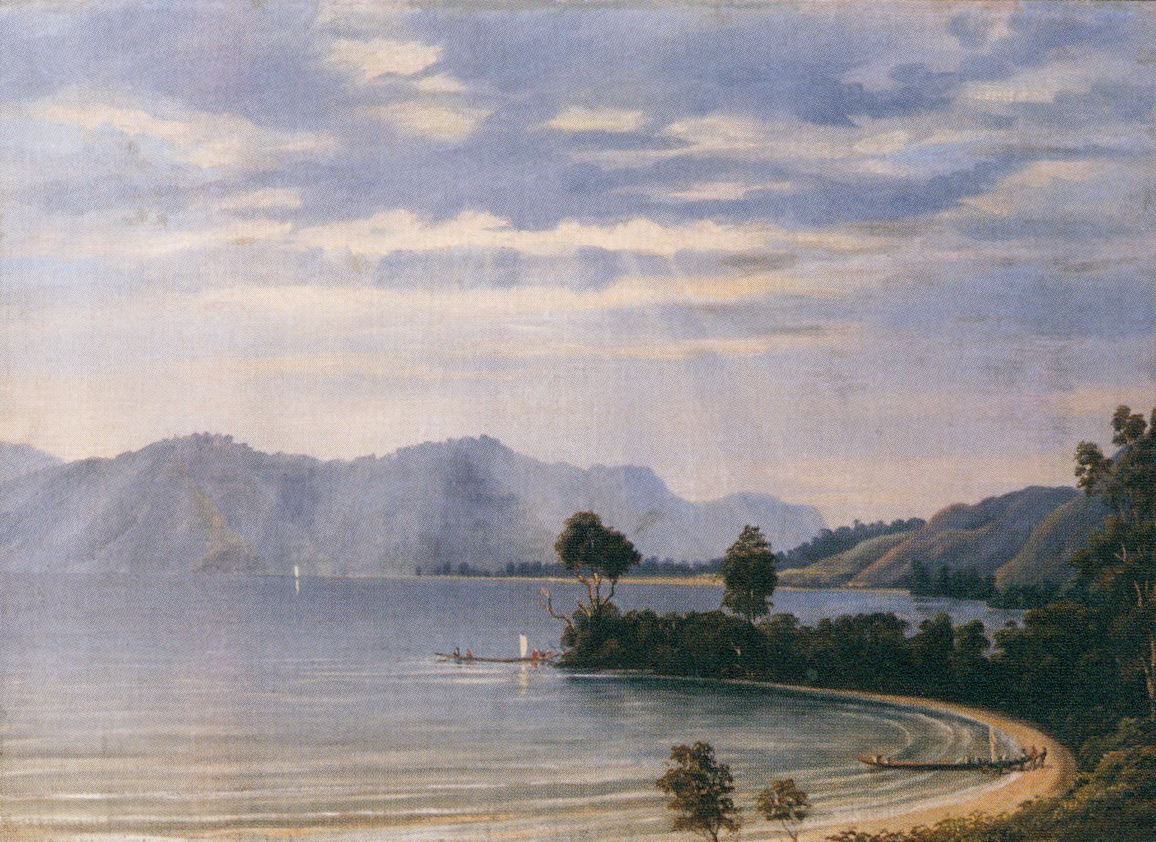
Lake Rotokakahi
