= Pink and White Terraces =

Land formation in New Zealand

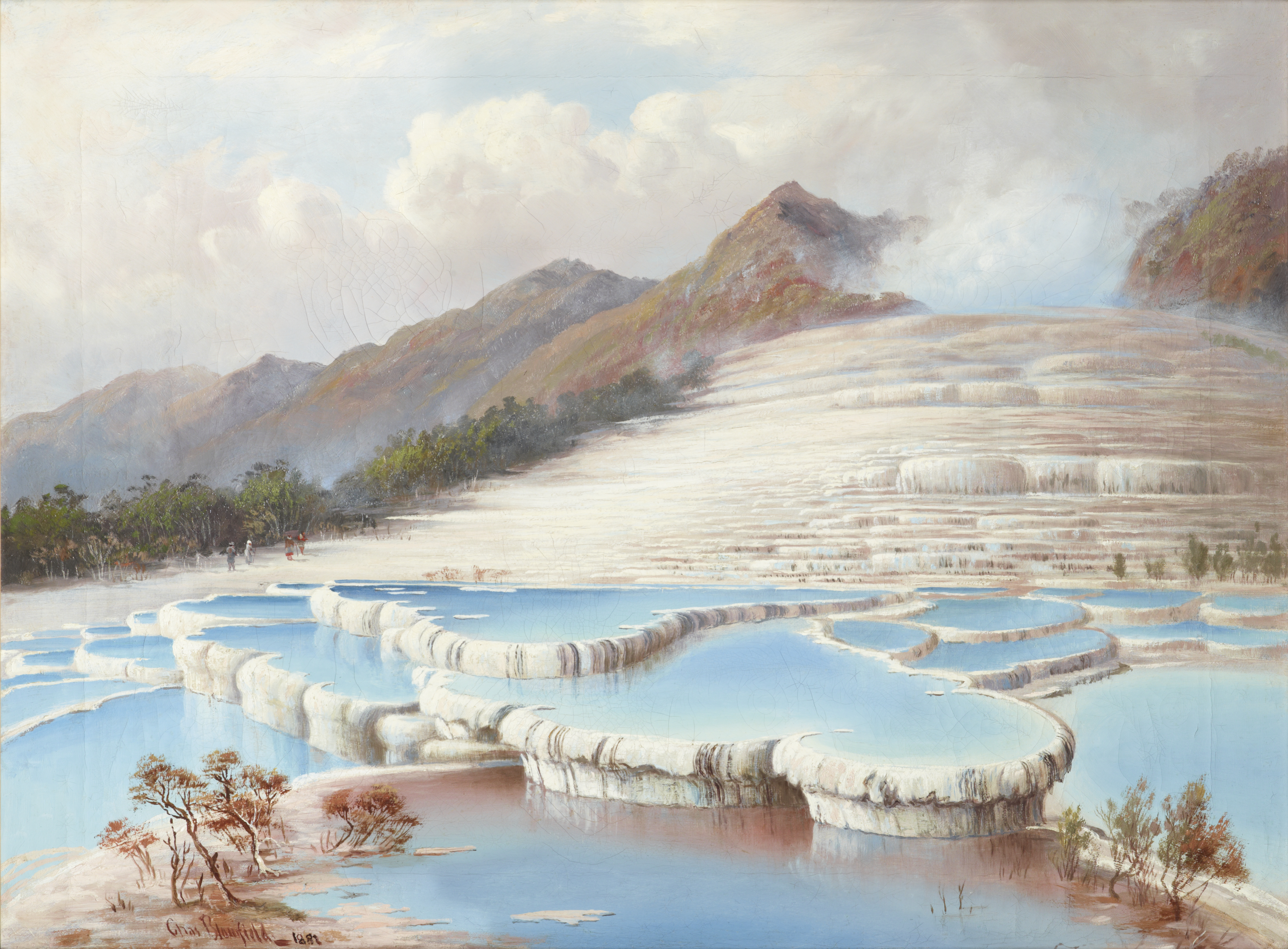
- The White Terraces by Charles Blomfield, 1884
- Interactive map of Pink and White Terraces
- Location: New Zealand; Bay of Plenty Region
- Coordinates: 38°15′38″S 176°25′50″E
- Spring source: Ōkataina Caldera
- Type: Hot spring

The Pink and White Terraces (Māori: Te Otukapuarangi, lit. 'the Fountain of the Clouded Sky' and Te Tarata, 'the Tattooed Rock') were natural wonders of New Zealand. They were reportedly the largest silica sinter deposits on Earth. They disappeared in the 1886 eruption of Mount Tarawera and were generally thought to have been destroyed, until evidence emerged in the early twenty-first century of their possible survival.

The Pink and White Terraces were formed by upwelling geothermal springs containing a cocktail of silica-saturated, near-neutral pH chloride water. These two world-famous springs were part of a group of hot springs and geysers, chiefly along an easterly ridge named Pinnacle Ridge (or the Steaming Ranges by Mundy). The main tourist attractions included Ngahapu, Ruakiwi, Te Tekapo, Waikanapanapa, Whatapoho, Ngawana, Koingo and Whakaehu.

The Pink and the White Terrace springs were around 1,200 metres (3,900 ft) apart. The White Terraces were at the north-east end of Lake Rotomahana and faced west to north west at the entrance to the Kaiwaka Channel. Te Tarata descended to the lake edge around 25 metres (82 ft) below. The Pink Terraces lay four fifths of the way down the lake on the western shore, facing east to south-east. The pink appearance over the mid and upper basins (similar to the colour of a rainbow trout) was due to antimony and arsenic sulfides, although the Pink Terraces also contained gold in ore-grade concentrations.

== Formation ==
The process of formation of the Pink and White Terraces was described by geology professor Patrick Marshall of Otago University: "The water is alkaline, and contains much silica in solution. As the water cools, its solvent power is diminished, and some of the silica is deposited. As the cooling is most rapid on the margin of the pool, deposition is also most rapid there, and a basin of white silica is gradually built up [so that] basins are formed wherever the water collected into small pools when it first flowed down the slope."

Geologist Ferdinand von Hochstetter wrote after his visit in 1859 that "doubtless thousands of years were required" for their formation. A more recent calculation by independent researcher Rex Bunn has provided a White Terraces date of about 5,000 BCE.

The White Terraces were the larger formation, covering about 8 hectares (20 acres) and descending over about 50 layers with a drop in elevation of about 25 metres (80 ft), and over about 240 metres (800 ft). The most northerly White Terrace was fed by the Te Tarata spring at its top. The Pink Terraces descended about 22 metres (70 ft) over about 100 metres (300 ft). The Pink Terraces started at the top 75–100 metres (250–330 ft) wide and the bottom layers were about 27 metres (90 ft) wide. Tourists preferred to bathe in the upper Pink Terrace pools as due to their clarity and the range of temperature and depths. There was also what was described as a "Black terrace" which appeared on Hochstetter's maps as Te Ngawha Ate Tuhi or Te Tuhi's spring, and is now the location of a crater..

== History ==
One of the first Europeans to visit Rotomahana was Ernst Dieffenbach. He briefly visited the lake and terraces while on a survey for the New Zealand Company in early June 1841. The description of his visit in his book Travels in New Zealand inspired an interest in the Pink and White Terraces by the outside world.

The terraces became New Zealand's most famous tourist attraction, sometimes referred to as the Eighth Wonder of the World. New Zealand was still relatively inaccessible to Europeans and passage took several months by ship. The journey from Auckland was typically by steamer to Tauranga, the bridle track to Ohinemutu on Lake Rotorua, by coach to Te Wairoa (the home of the missionary the Reverend Seymour Mills Spencer), by canoe across Lake Tarawera, and then on foot or by canoe up or down the Kaiwaka Channel; over the hill to the swampy shores of Lake Rotomahana and the terraces, access to which was controlled by Tūhourangi. Artist Charles Blomfield recounted that tourists would arrive at the White Terrace about 11 a.m., view the sights there, lunch on potatoes and kōura (freshwater crayfish) cooked at a boiling spring, cross over to the Pink Terraces, bathe there and then go back.

Those who made the journey to the terraces were most frequently well-to-do, young male overseas tourists or officers from the British forces in New Zealand. The list of notable tourists included Sir George Grey in 1849, Alfred Duke of Edinburgh in 1869, and Victorian novelist Anthony Trollope in 1874.

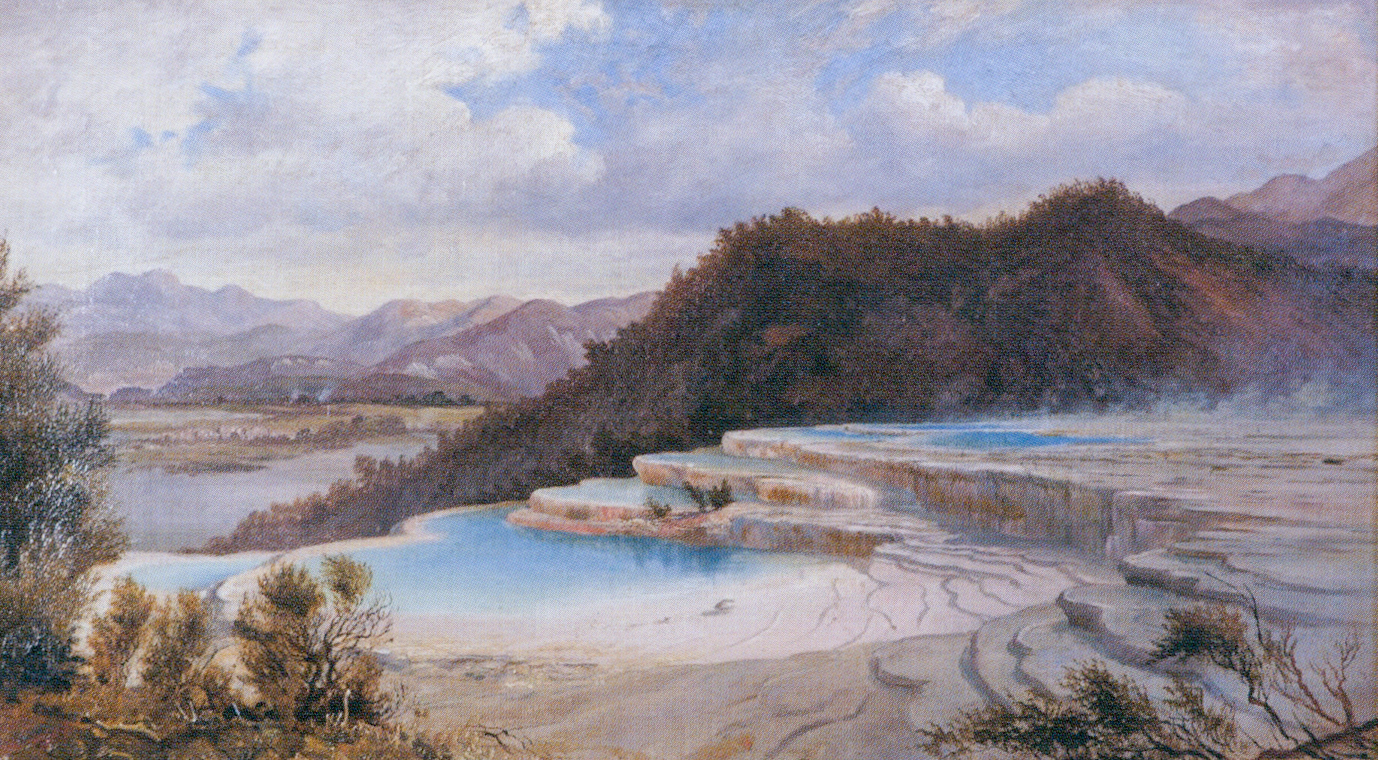
A view of the Pink Terrace by Charles Bloomfield, 1887

The appearance of the terraces was recorded for posterity by a number of photographers, but as it was before colour photography was invented, their images lack the enticing colour the formations were known for. Several artists drew and painted the terraces before their loss in 1886, most notably Charles Blomfield who visited on more than one occasion. Their atmospheric views are the main record of the Eighth Wonder of the World. The colour chemistry of the Pink Terraces can be seen today at Waiotapu, where the Champagne Pool is lined with these same colloidal sulfides.

Sophia Hinerangi, sometimes known as Te Paea, took over as principal guide from the older Kate Middlemass in the early 1880s. She became recognised as the principal tourist guide of the Pink and White Terraces. Hinerangi observed the disturbances to Lake Tarawera water levels in the days preceding the eruption. In 1885, Alfred Warbrick, a boat builder at Te Wairoa, began guiding, though he was not from Te Tūhourangi.

== Mapping ==
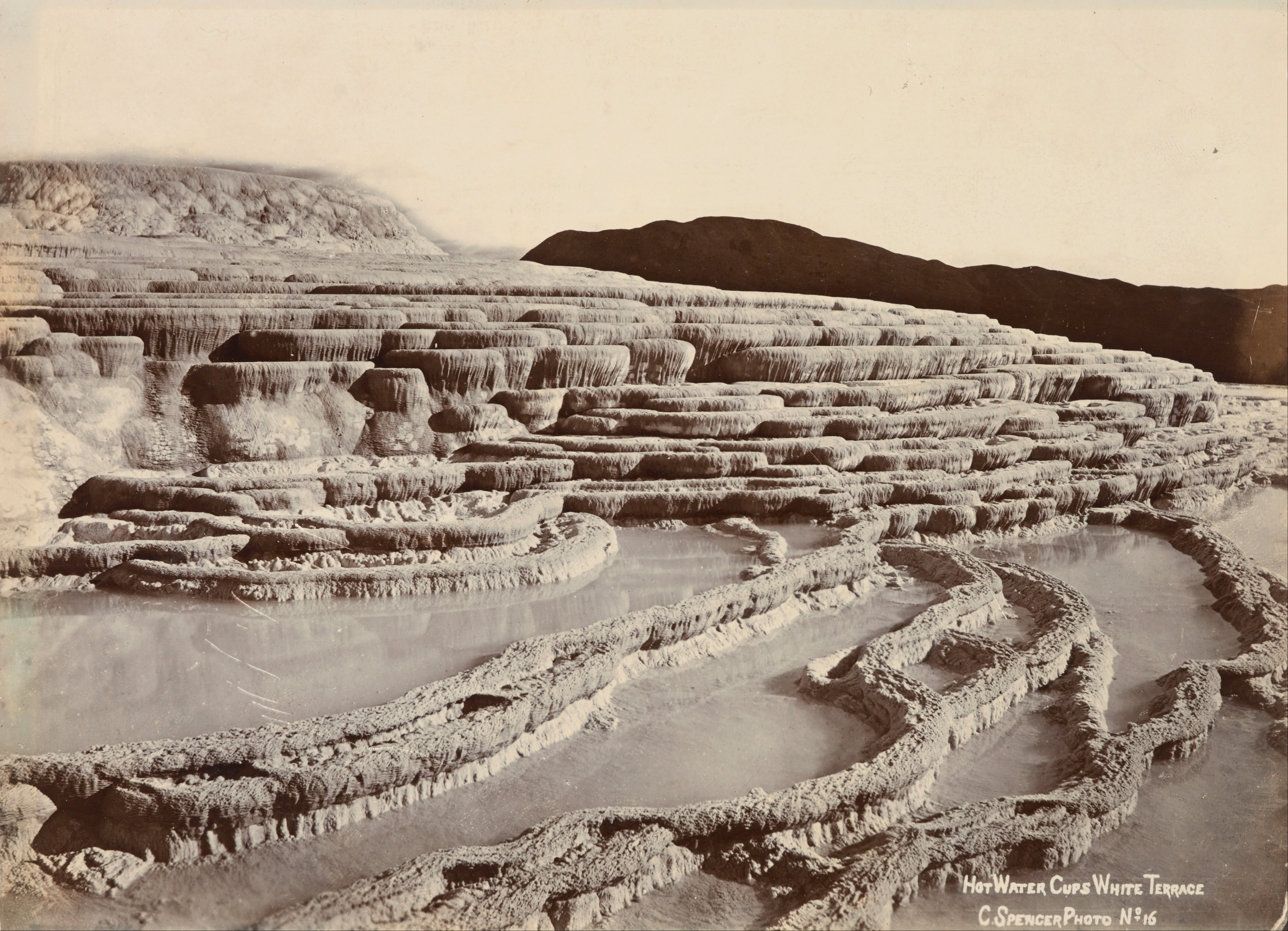
The White Terraces, between 1880 and 1885

A number of people mapped and commented on the region before the loss of the terraces. No Māori maps are known. The first colonial sketch map of the lake was by Assistant Surveyor-General Percy Smith in 1858. Hochstetter carried out the first topographic and geological survey of the Lake Rotomahana area in 1859, producing four maps of the lake while camped on its shore; culminating in his defining "Method of Squares" (or Grid) lake map of 30 April 1859. His lake research was later published in his Geographic and Geological survey where the formation of the terraces was also examined. A commissioned map by August Petermann was included in that work and this was considered valid until 2011 when researcher Sascha Nolden discovered Hochstetter's original maps in Switzerland and repatriated them to New Zealand in digital form. In 2017 the Hochstetter and Petermann maps were compared and Petermann's map found defective. Hochstetter's 30 April 1859 map is now considered the more accurate map of Lake Rotomahana.

High-quality photographs of the terraces were available in Europe by 1875.

== Disappearance ==
On 10 June 1886, Mount Tarawera erupted. The eruption spread from west of Wahanga dome, 5 kilometres (3.1 mi) to the north, down to Lake Rotomahana. The volcano belched out hot mud, red hot boulders, and immense clouds of black ash from a 17-kilometre (11 mi) rift that crossed the mountain, passed through the lake, and extended beyond into the Waimangu valley.

After the eruption, a crater over 100 metres (300 ft) in depth encompassed the former site of the terraces. After some years this filled with water to form a new Lake Rotomahana, 30 to 40 metres (100 to 130 ft) higher, ten times larger and deeper than the old lake.

After methodically examining the region over the months following the eruption, along with a number of government experts, Percy Smith declared that either the terraces were buried under stone, or else had sunk into the main crater.

== Location ==
The prevailing view in the years following the 1886 eruption was that the terraces had been destroyed and that they would never be seen again. However, there were some, Chief Guide Warbrick principal among them, who continued to maintain that they had survived, buried beneath a deposit of mud and volcanic ash, although none was able to produce any evidence to support claims of survival.

Although active searching for the terraces had long ceased, in February 2011 a team of researchers from GNS Science, Woods Hole Oceanographic Institution, Lamont–Doherty Earth Observatory and Waikato University reported discovering part of the Pink Terraces in the course of their mapping the floor of Lake Rotomahana with a REMUS underwater vehicle. The lowest two tiers of the terraces were reported found at 60 metres (200 ft) deep. A part of the White Terraces was also reported as rediscovered in June 2011.

The 2011 GNS claims of rediscovery were challenged by Bill Keir, a freelance researcher, who calculated that the 'rediscovered' structures were not where the terraces had been before the eruption and speculated that they were either prehistoric terraces or step-shaped objects created by the eruption. Keir's speculations were rebutted by Cornel de Ronde, Research Geologist at GNS Science.

In February 2014, Bunn founded PAWTL (Pink & White Terraces Limited), a social enterprise company, with the objective of draining the lake and recovering the in situ terraces, relying on the GNS locations. The company was to be operated by the Tūhourangi and Ngati Rangitihi Arawa hapū that had been associated with tourist ventures to the Terraces in the nineteenth century. However, after GNS advised of the risk of an eruption, the project was suspended.

In March 2016, the GNS team published in the Journal of Volcanology and Geothermal Research results of returns to the site in 2012 and 2014. In that paper, they retracted their previous claims of rediscovery and concluded that "the majority of both sets of terraces were destroyed".

Later in 2016, in December, Bunn and Nolden published a paper that drew on Nolden's discovery in 2010 of Hochstetter's original maps to suggest the locations may have survived the eruption. In a follow-up paper published in June 2017 in the Journal of the Royal Society of New Zealand, Bunn and Nolden concluded that, contrary to the prevailing belief, the Pink and White Terraces were not submerged beneath Lake Rotomahana, but were instead buried 10 to 15 metres (30 to 50 ft) underground along the shoreline, and could potentially be excavated and restored to public view, dependent on the permission of the Māori iwi which owned the land.

A paper by Keir in December 2017 disputed Bunn and Nolden's findings and contended that the terraces could not have survived intact.

Tūhourangi Tribal Authority chairman Alan Skipwith, speaking after TV3 in March 2018 had referred to the terraces' "discovery", thanked Bunn and Nolden for their research that potentially proved the location of the terraces but stated that the Authority was in no position to conclusively identify a location. Two researchers from NIWA, acknowledging the relevance of their research to the Tūhourangi iwi, disputed the location of the terraces using Hochstetter's mapping; Bunn countered with a commentary that pointed out errors in their findings and their conclusion that the terraces were destroyed.

In June 2018, a paper by Bunn, Davies and Stewart used a novel "field of view" approach to establish "with maximum possible accuracy" the locations of the terraces, taking previously unpublished photographs from Hochstetter's 1859 expedition, along with his diary entries, as reference points.

Later in 2018, de Ronde, Tontini and Keam contended that the locations identified in Bunn and Nolden's 2016 and 2017 papers were unsupported by their own analyses, which indicated that the terraces "largely would have been destroyed".

Between 2019 and 2026, Bunn and fellow researchers published books and papers that accumulated a body of evidence for the survival of the terraces in the locations that they had identified. This evidence included the first altimetric measurements of the landscape, triangulation of coordinates for the White Terrace, mātauranga Māori knowledge, and the analysis of a recently restored pre-eruption photograph by pioneer photographer Wiliam Fitzgerald Crawford. A major conclusion was that the White Terraces presently lie buried on the existing Lake Rotomahana shoreline outside the 1886 crater and that excavation of the terraces is feasible.

== Similar places ==
- Badab-e Surt in Iran
- Hierve el Agua in Mexico
- Mammoth Hot Springs at Yellowstone National Park in the United States
- Pamukkale in Turkey
- Terme di Saturnia in Italy
- Huanglong in China
- Egerszalók in Hungary
