= Mount Tarawera =

Volcano in New Zealand

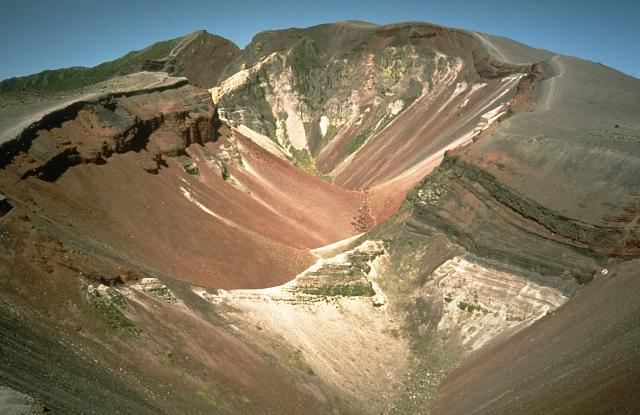
- Fissure formed during the 1886 eruption

Highest point
- Elevation: 1,111 m (3,645 ft)
- Coordinates: 38°13′37″S 176°30′24″E

Geography
- Location within New Zealand Location within North Island
- Location: North Island, New Zealand

Geology
- Rock age: 21,900 years
- Mountain type: Lava dome with fissure vent
- Volcanic zone: Taupō Volcanic Zone
- Last eruption: May 1981 (Waimangu); June 1951 (Rotomahana); June to August 1886 (Tarawera)

Mount Tarawera is a volcano on the North Island of New Zealand within the older but volcanically productive Ōkataina Caldera. Located 24 kilometres southeast of Rotorua, it consists of a series of rhyolitic lava domes that were fissured down the middle by an explosive basaltic eruption in 1886. While the 1886 eruption was basaltic, study has shown there was only a small basalt component to the previous recent rhyolitic predominant eruptions. This eruption was one of New Zealand's largest historical eruptions, and killed an estimated 120 people. The fissures run for about 17 kilometres (11 mi) northeast–southwest.

The volcano's component domes include Ruawahia Dome (the highest at 1,111 metres), Tarawera Dome and Wahanga Dome. It is surrounded by several lakes, most of which were created or drastically altered by the 1886 eruption. These include Lakes Tarawera, Rotomahana, Rerewhakaaitu, Ōkataina, Ōkareka, Tikitapu / Blue and Rotokākahi / Green. The Tarawera River runs northeastwards across the northern flank of the mountain from Lake Tarawera.

In 2000, the mountain was ceded to the Ngāti Rangitihi sub-tribe of Te Arawa. In 2002, the group and their lessee stopped previously free public access to the mountain. This decision caused angst among Rotorua residents.

== History ==
=== Ōkareka eruption ===
The eruption that generated the Ōkareka Tephra has been dated to 23,535 ± 300 years before the present. It had a tephra volume of about 12 cubic kilometres (2.9 cu mi) but may be less, generated in days or weeks at the most. The associated eruption mountain building appears to have been at both ends of the complex and includes present features at the eastern end such as the Rotomahana Dome (434 m (1,424 ft)) and Patiti Island (peak is 404 m (1,325 ft) high) which is in the middle of Lake Rotomahana. Lava fields at the western end came from sources most likely buried in the Waiohau eruption, have a volume of at least 5 cubic kilometres (1.2 cu mi), and would have taken several years to form. The Ōkareka Embayment is a separate, but adjacent volcanic structure in the Ōkataina Caldera responsible for the Rotorua Tephra.

=== Rerewhakaaitu eruption ===
The Rerewhakaaitu eruption has been recently re-dated forward to 17,496 ± 462 years ago, at about the time of the last glacial termination, with a tephra volume of about 7.5 cubic kilometres (1.8 cu mi). Other historic sources suggested a higher volume. It involved three rhyolite magmas with a total volume of about 5 cubic kilometres (1.2 cu mi) with the Rerewhakaaitu Tephra having 15 rhyolitic fall units. The Southern (1,024 m (3,360 ft)) and Western (446 m (1,463 ft)) Domes were formed at this time and the lava excursion of 2 cubic kilometres (0.48 cu mi) again lasted for several years after the much shorter tephra phase of the eruption.

=== Waiohau eruption ===
The Waiohau eruption occurred 14,009 ± 155 years ago (recently re-dated backward). The Kanakana (925 m (3,035 ft)) and Eastern (529 m (1,736 ft)) Domes were formed. The estimated total volume of the fifteen or more Waiohau Tephra eruptions and some lava is 2 cubic kilometres (0.48 cu mi). During one of the eruptions structural collapse of the then mountain occurred.

=== Kaharoa eruption ===
Mount Tarawera erupted 1314±12 CE in the Kaharoa eruption. This was just a few years after the first Māori settlement about 1280 CE although more widespread settlement is now believed to have not taken place until 1320 to 1350 AD. The Plinian phase of this eruption consisted of 11 discrete episodes of VEI 4 although there are possibly two more discrete sub-Plinian phases in a two-stage eruption from at least two different vents along a 8 km (5.0 mi) long fissure. The total dense rock equivalent (DRE) was at least 9.1 km^{3} (2.2 cu mi). It distributed the Kaharoa Tephra, very low in the essential mineral cobalt (lack of cobalt is a factor in New Zealand bush sickness), from the east coast of the Northland Peninsula, down the Coromandel Peninsula and through beyond Tarawera to northern Hawke Bay at the Māhia Peninsula. The total volume of material erupted was more than 5 times that of the 1886 eruption and has been stated to be at least 15 km^{3} (3.6 cu mi) of tephra. The Ruawahia (1,111 m (3,645 ft)), Tarawera (874 m (2,867 ft)), Wahanga (1,025 m (3,363 ft)) and Crater (1,095 m (3,593 ft)) Domes were formed.

=== 1886 eruption ===
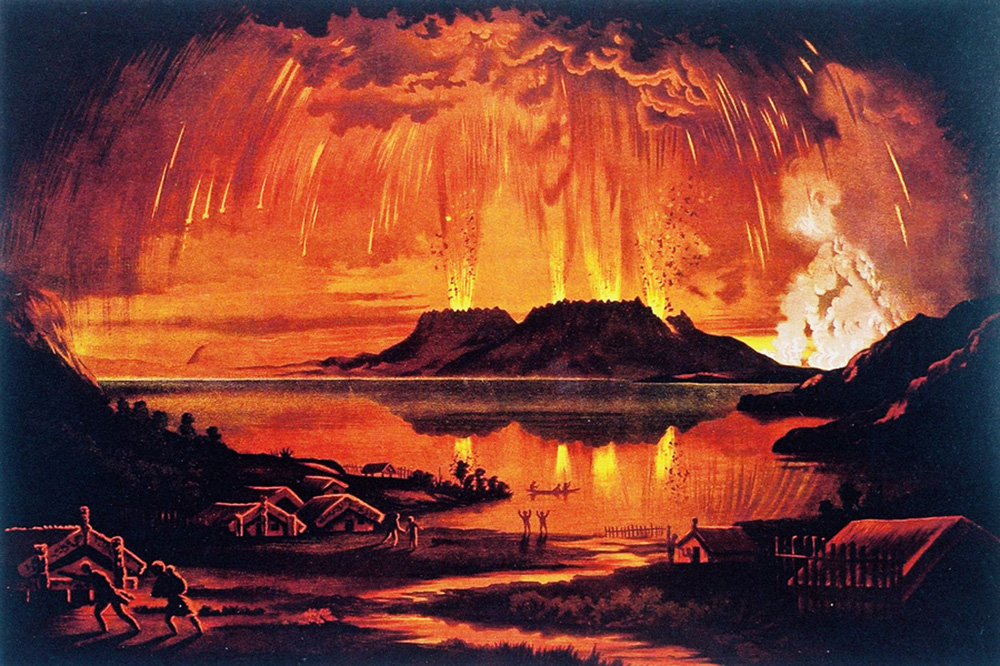
Mount Tarawera in Eruption by Charles Blomfield

Shortly after midnight on the morning of 10 June 1886, a series of more than 30 increasingly strong earthquakes were felt in the Rotorua area and by 2:45 am Mount Tarawera's three peaks had erupted, blasting three distinct columns of smoke and ash thousands of metres into the sky At around 3.30 am, the largest phase of the eruption commenced; vents at Rotomahana produced a pyroclastic surge that destroyed several villages within a 6 kilometer radius, and the Pink and White Terraces appeared to be obliterated. Recent research using mathematical modelling of events during the later Rotomahana eruption phase, is consistent with eyewitness accounts; describing it resembling a pot boiling over.

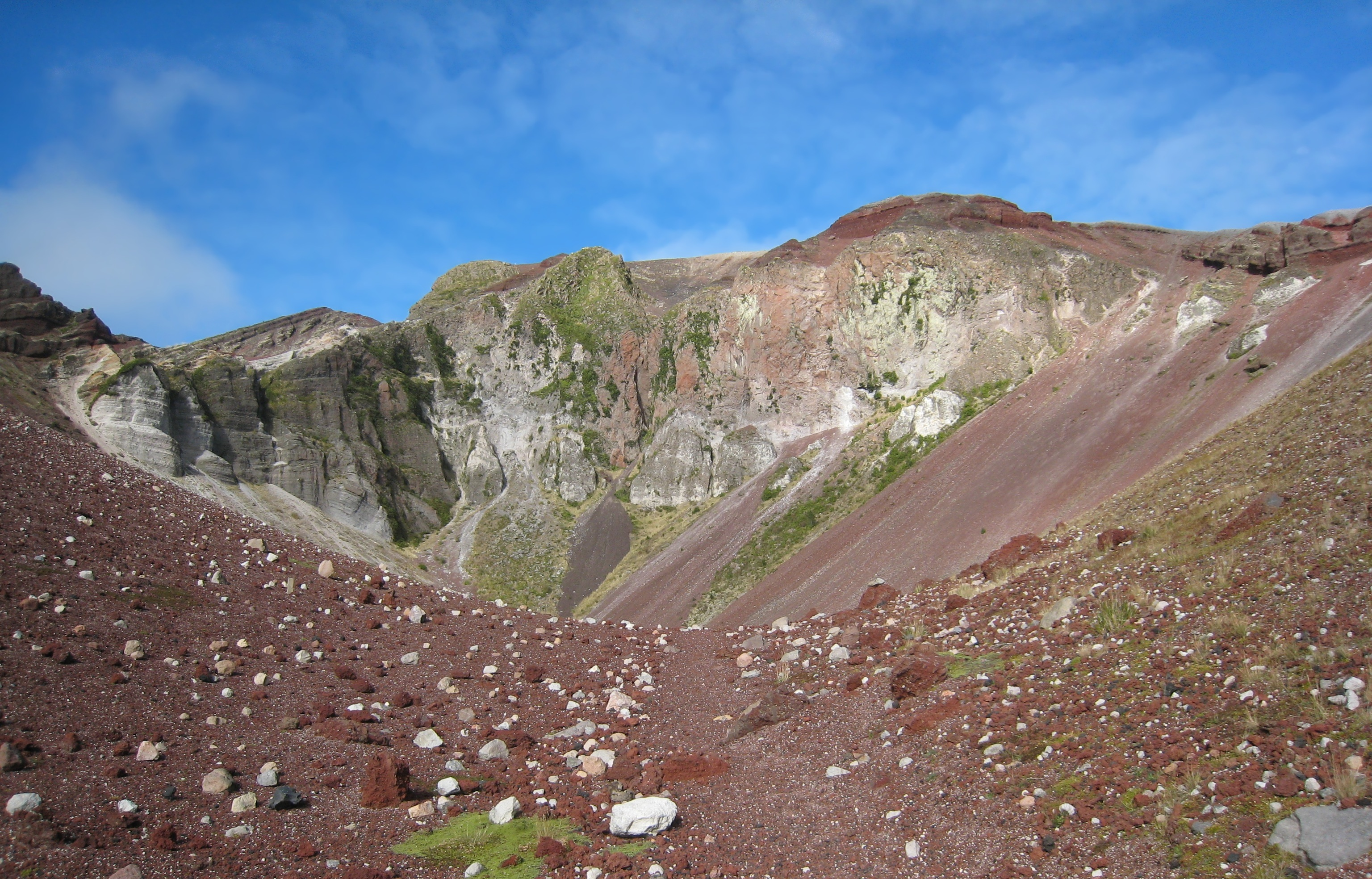
Crumbling scoria cliffs surround the summit rift

Settlements inhabited by Ngāti Rangitihi and Tūhourangi around the Ariki arm of Lake Tarawera, including Moura, Koutu, Kokotaia, Piripai, Pukekiore and Otuapane, Tapahoro, Te Wairoa, Totarariki, and Waingongoro, were buried or destroyed. Of these, Te Wairoa is now a tourist attraction and is described as the "buried village". The official death toll was reported as 153, and many more were displaced, making the eruption the most deadly in New Zealand history.

The eruption was also believed to have destroyed the world-famous Pink and White Terraces. However, 125 years after the eruption a small portion of the Pink Terraces was reportedly rediscovered under Lake Rotomahana. This was due to the discovery of a previously unknown 1859 survey of Lake Rotomahana by Ferdinand von Hochstetter, which was deciphered and published between 2016 and 2019. This unique primary data indicate the Pink, Black and White Terrace locations now lie along the present lake shores. There is a prospect the terraces or sections of them, may lie buried, and as a result the terraces can no longer be assumed destroyed.

== The phantom waka ==
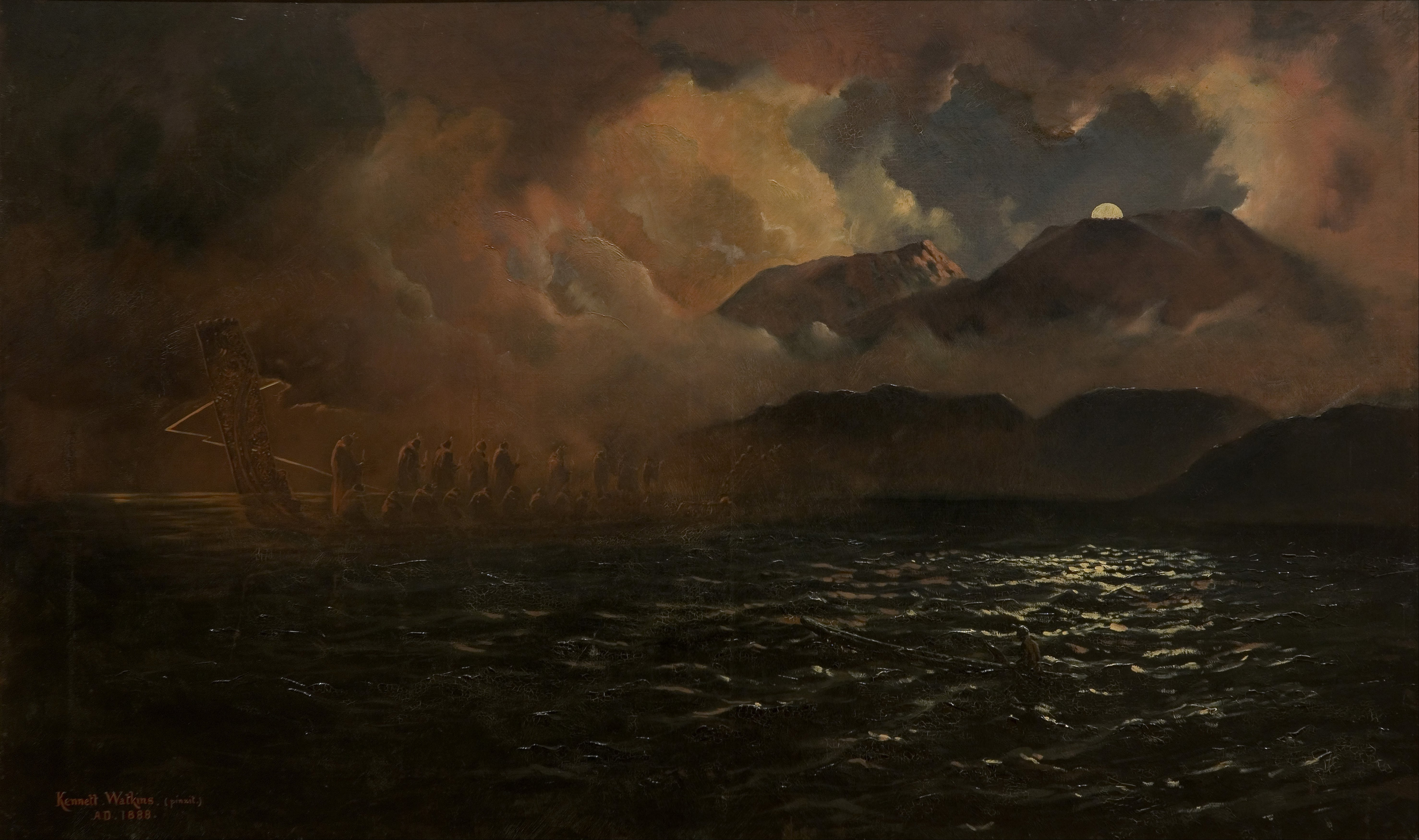
The Phantom Canoe: A Legend of Lake Tarawera, by Kennett Watkins

One legend surrounding the 1886 eruption is that of the phantom waka (canoe). Eleven days before the eruption, a boat full of tourists returning from the Terraces saw what appeared to be a waka approach their boat, only to disappear in the mist half a mile from them. One of the witnesses was a clergyman, a local Maori man from the Te Arawa iwi. Nobody around the lake owned such a war canoe, and nothing like it had been seen on the lake for many years. It is possible that the rise and fall of the lake level caused by pre-eruption fissures had freed a burial waka from its resting place. Traditionally, the dead were tied in an upright position. A number of letters have been published from the tourists who experienced the event.

Though skeptics maintained that it was a freak reflection seen on the mist, tribal elders at Te Wairoa claimed that it was a waka wairua (spirit canoe) and was a portent of doom. It has been suggested that the waka was actually a freak wave on the water, caused by seismic activity below the lake, but locals believe that a future eruption will be signalled by the reappearance of the waka.

== Geology ==
Map of Mount Tarawera with Ōkataina surface volcanic deposits in the years after the Rotoiti eruption with darker shading for more recent. Legend: Key for the volcanics that are shown with panning is: basalt; dacite; rhyolite / ignimbrite; █ Definite vents; Ōkataina Volcanic Centre with its embayments; postulated sub calderas of Cole et al. 2009 onwards

It is within the Ōkataina Caldera of the Ōkataina Volcanic Centre in the central segment of the Taupō Volcanic Zone. This rhyolitic segment is dominated by explosive caldera. The actual basaltic dyke of the 1886 eruption is 15 kilometres (9.3 mi) long and extends from the eruptive fissure of Mount Tarawera to Lake Rotomahana and has a remnant hydrothermal hot spot in the Waimangu Volcanic Rift Valley. The dyke and linear line of vents align with the Taupō Rift at this point.

== Gallery ==
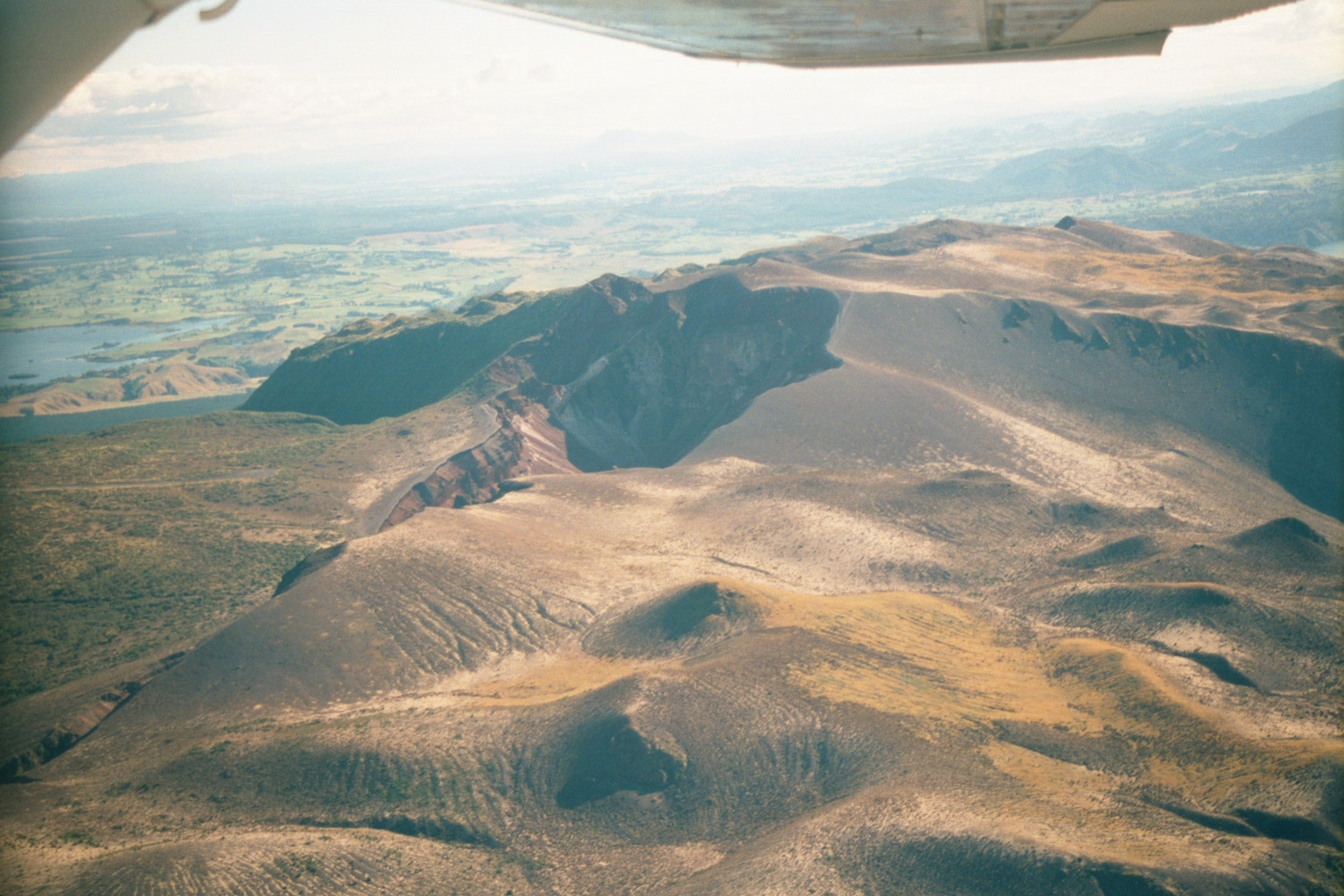
View from the north

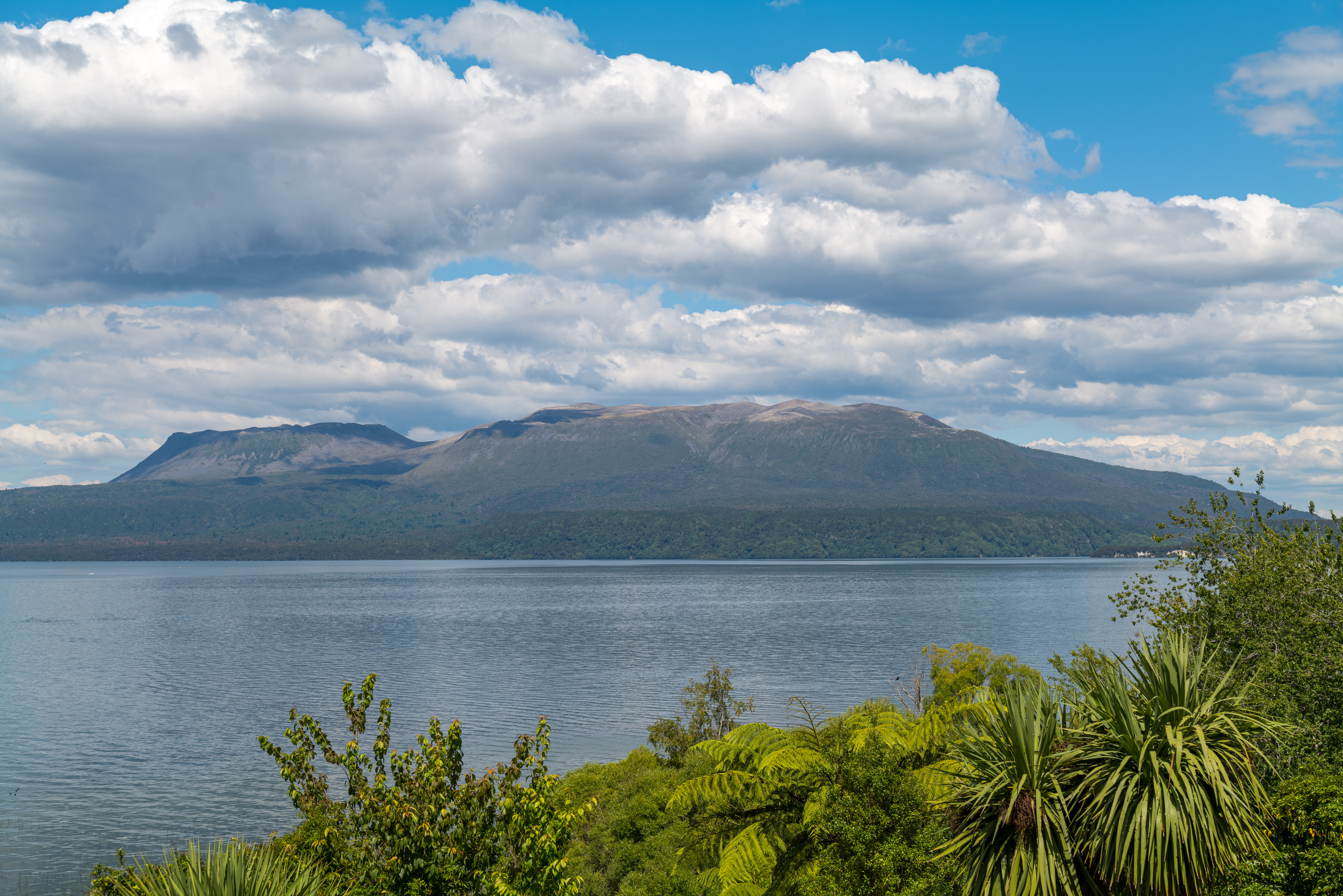
View from the northeast

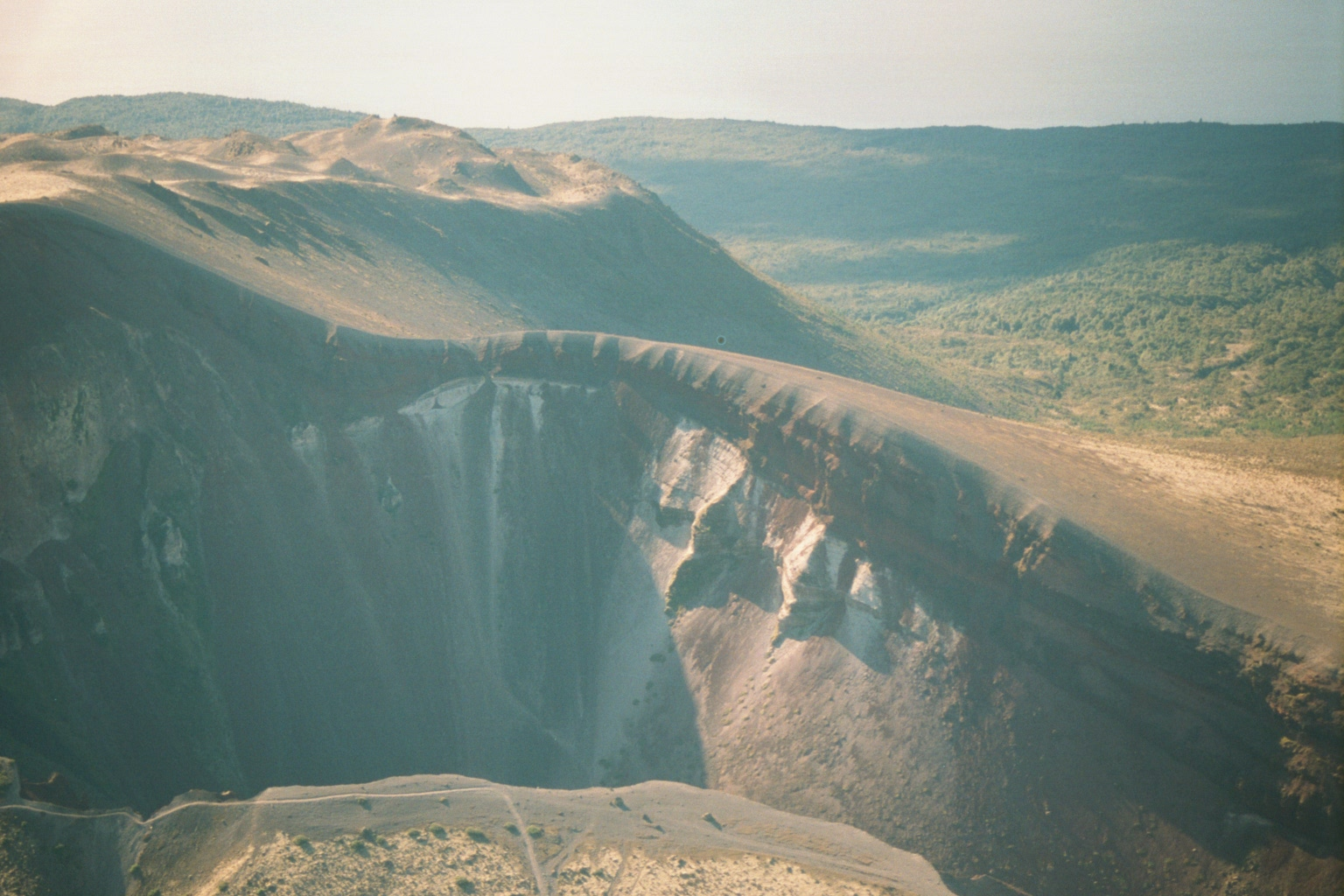
Close up of one chasm

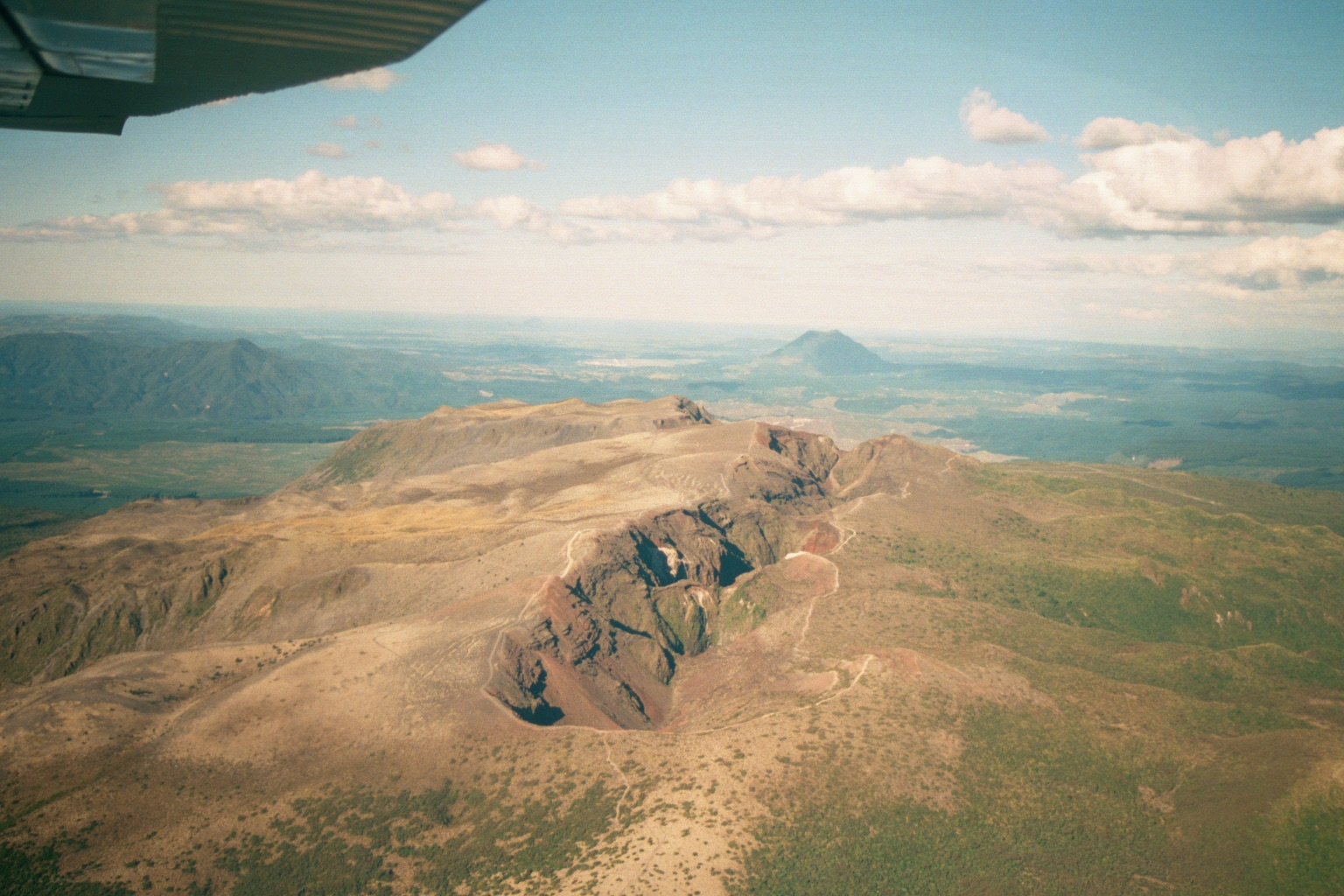
Southwest side

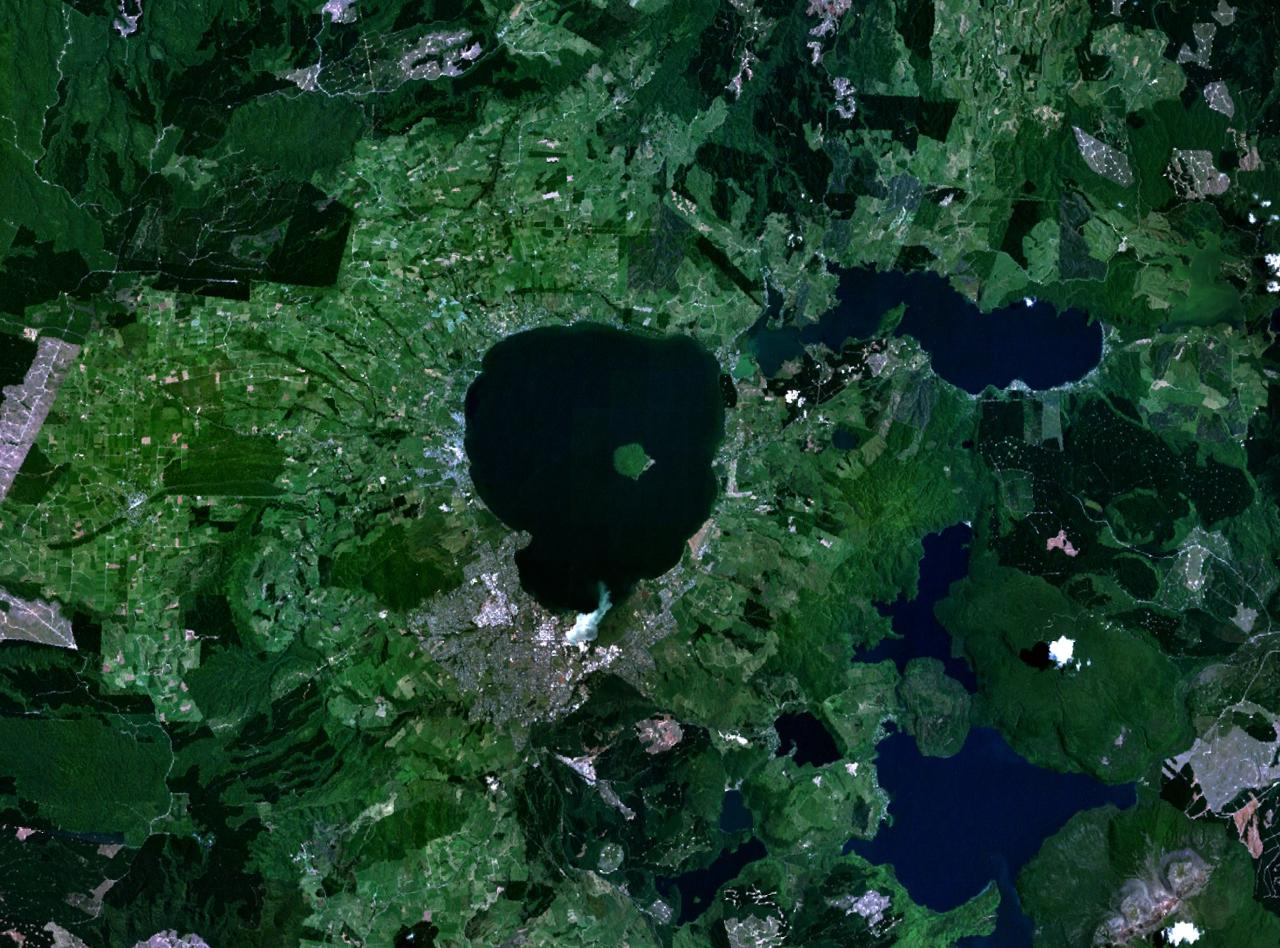
Satellite view of Lake Rotorua; Mount Tarawera is in the lower right corner

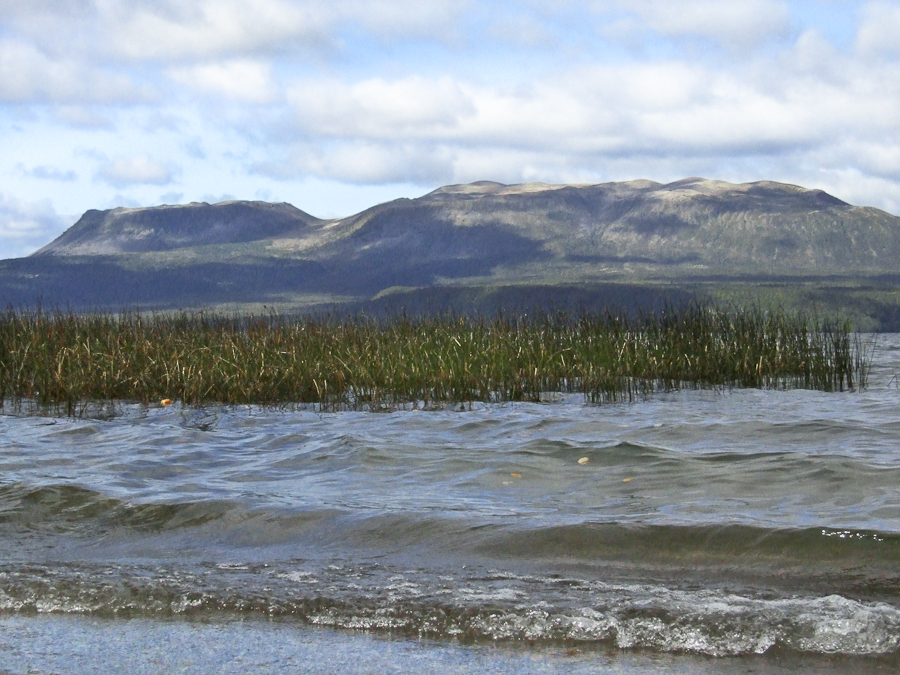
Mount Tarawera standing behind Lake Tarawera

== See also ==
- List of mountains of New Zealand by height
- List of volcanoes in New Zealand
- Volcanism of New Zealand
