= Bessie Blomfield =

New Zealand artist (1880–1984)

Elizabeth Blomfield (10 August 1880 – 17 August 1984) was a New Zealand artist. Her work is held in the permanent collection of the Hocken Collections, Dunedin.

== Biography ==
Blomfield was born in Auckland to painter Charles Blomfield and his wife Ellen. She learnt painting from her father and C. F. Goldie and specialised in floral paintings and portraits; later in her life she also painted landscapes.

She exhibited with the Otago Art Society and the Auckland Society of Arts. One of her oil paintings of Dunedin is in the Hocken Collections.

Blomfield was buried at Hillsborough Cemetery, in a plot adjacent to her father's grave.

=== Personal life ===
Blomfield married William Kendon in 1908 and following her marriage exhibited as Bessie Kendon or Elizabeth Kendon.
