= Te Wairoa, New Zealand =

Te Wairoa
- Ghost town
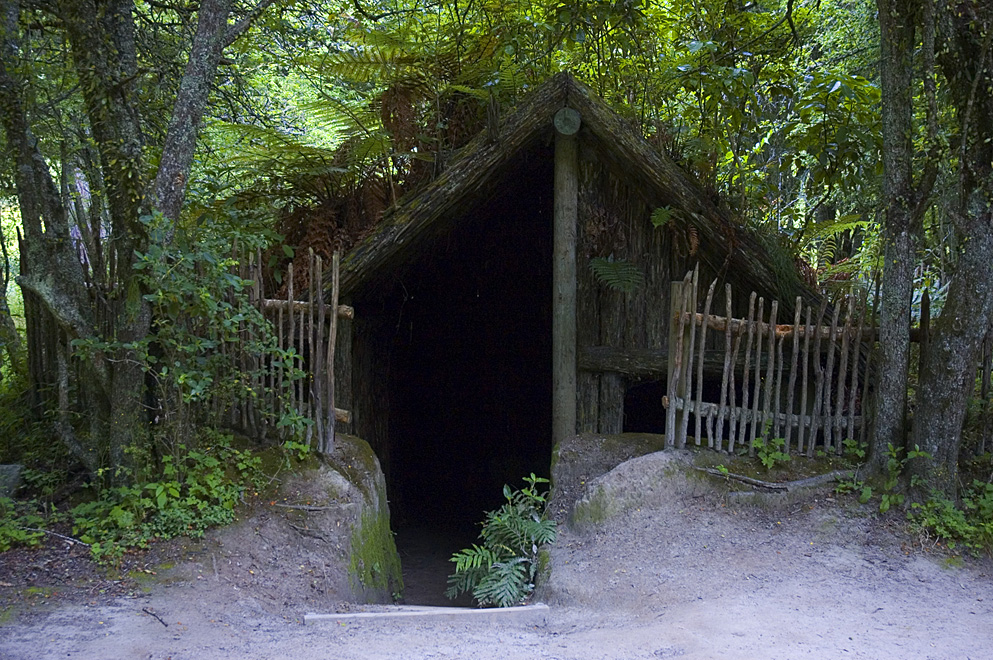
- Dwelling at Te Wairoa
- Etymology: "the long stream" in Māori
- Nickname: Buried Village
- Location of Te Wairoa
- Coordinates: 38°12′45″S 176°21′52″E
- Country: New Zealand
- Region: Bay of Plenty
- District: Rotorua
- Established: 1848
- Founder: Seymour Mills Spencer
- Elevation: 400 m (1,300 ft)

Population (2018)
  - Total: 0

Te Wairoa was a village close to the shore of Lake Tarawera near Rotorua, New Zealand. The village was buried by volcanic ash in the 1886 eruption of Mount Tarawera. It was later excavated and is now open as a tourist destination, the Buried Village. The nearby Wairere Falls are also a tourist destination.

The Buried Village is open to the public and shows the excavated ruins of the village, recovered relics on display in a museum and the history of the eruption. It is located 14 kilometres (8.7 mi) south-east of Rotorua on Tarawera Road.

The New Zealand Ministry for Culture and Heritage gives a translation of 'the long stream' for Te Wairoa.

== History ==
Te Wairoa was a Māori and European settlement founded about 1850 by the Reverend Seymour Mills Spencer where visitors would stay on their way to visit the Pink and White Terraces. About 1865 the New Zealand Wars resulted in temporary abandonment of the town until the 1870s.

At the time of the eruption it had two hotels, McRae's Hotel (Rotomahana Hotel, 25 rooms), and the Terrace Hotel (Terrace Temperance Hotel, 12 rooms), but these had only 3 guests. There were about a 135 permanent inhabitants, but because of a tangi many Māori were visiting. The village and the terraces were destroyed by the eruption of Mount Tarawera on 10 June 1886. One hundred and twenty people died in the eruption, many of them in other villages closer to the volcano. The site of one of these villages (Kokotaia) was utilised in the postulated rediscovery of the Pink and White Terrace locations.

A Māori meeting house named Hinemihi (more fully Hinemihi o te Ao Tawhito), which provided shelter to the people of Te Wairoa village during the eruption, was relocated in 1892 to Clandon Park as an ornamental garden building and a souvenir of William Onslow, 4th Earl of Onslow.

=== 1886 eruption ===
Being 13 km (8.1 mi) from Mount Tarawera, those in the village were among the nearest surviving witnesses of its 1886 eruption. During the day of 9 June, there had been a little rain, but the evening was fine and clear. About half-past midnight on 10 June slight earthquakes were noticed by some in Te Wairoa who were not asleep. Between 1:15 a.m. by a Te Wairoa account and 1:20 a.m. by another observer with a watch, there was a flash of light. A column of dark vapour, described as black smoke, was seen rising by some of the inhabitants of Te Wairoa by 1:30 am. Most Te Wairoa witnesses seem to have been awaken by about 1:45 a.m. At Te Wairoa the first stones fell about 3 am with mud or ashes continuing to fall until 9 a.m. Roofs had collapsed by 3:40 a.m. There was no difficulty in walking about on the surface of the ash next morning, but after having been trampled on for a day or two, the surface along the road was converted into mud. Much of the ash fell either as mud or in a moist, flaky condition, which after little rain converted to mud. At Te Wairoa after the eruption, the ash depth was 0.8636 m (2 ft 10.00 in), and one of the deeper layers was in a very wet state. Over 40% of the ash deposit was described as fine, white and earthy, but not plastic, with black scoria layers varying from 7 to 22%, by weight.

From dawn, which was about 7:15 a.m., it being winter, some survivors set off towards Rotorua. Rescue parties met them on the way and some of the able-bodied chose to return to Te Wairoa to aid in digging out the buried. Some looting had occurred when the rescuers arrived.

Other accounts suggest that the surface basaltic eruptions of Tarawera proper stopped some time on the 10th, with the last record of Mount Tarawera noisy activity being about 5 p.m. and only steam observed from 11 June. Significant hydrothermal eruptions continued in the Rotomahana crater until the night of 12 July 1886, related to subsurface intrusion of the basalt along a dyke into the pre-existing hydrothermal systems of the Rotomahana area. This correct molten dyke hypothesis was postulated soon after the eruption, but was not geological mainstream understanding of some volcanic activity at the time.

During an earthquake following the eruption on 20 July, on the road between Rotorua and Te Wairoa, a fissure was opened, where a post eruption pond had formed, that was 230 m (750 ft) long and up to 30 m (98 ft) deep.

=== Tourism renewal ===
Tourism returned to Te Wairoa in around 1900-01, with 'the buried village' featuring on the tourist "Round Trip" by 1902–1903. The first post-eruption house (Tikitapu Cottage) was built at Te Wairoa in 1904, by Guide Cromwell Shepherd.

An accommodation house and tea kiosk were established in 1906. The current 'Buried Village' site encompasses about a third of the old village site.

Pictures relevant to Te Wairoa
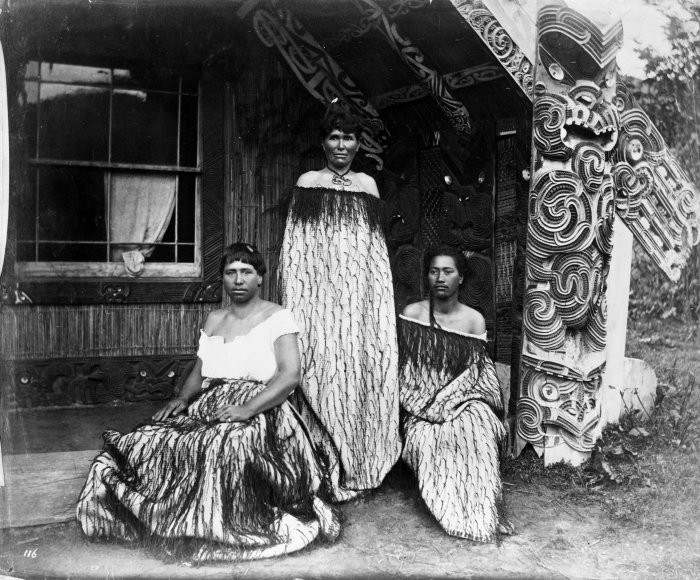
Tourist guides Sophia Hinerangi (standing), Kati and another, outside Hinemihi meeting house at Te Wairoa. Taken by Elizabeth Pulman about 1881

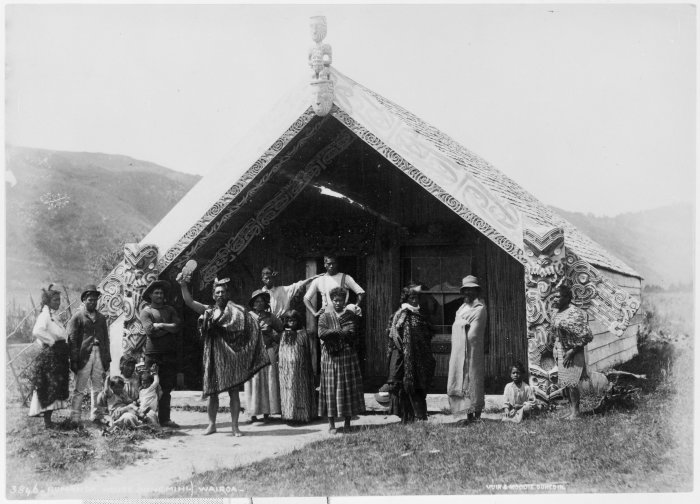
Photograph of a group of Maori between 1881 and 1886, in front of the Hinemihi meeting house at Te Wairoa, Lake Tarawera, New Zealand. Āporo Te Wharekāniwha is holding a club aloft, and died of illness in Rotorua's Sanatorium Hospital on 23 May 1886.

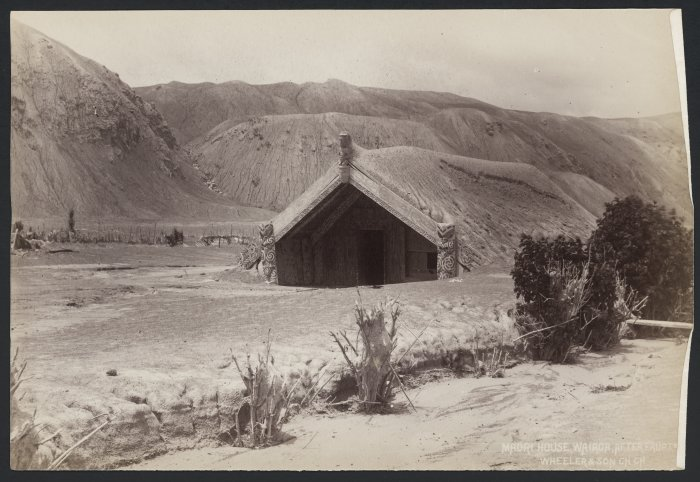
Hinemihi Meeting House at Te Wairoa immediately after the 1886 eruption of Mount Tarawera.

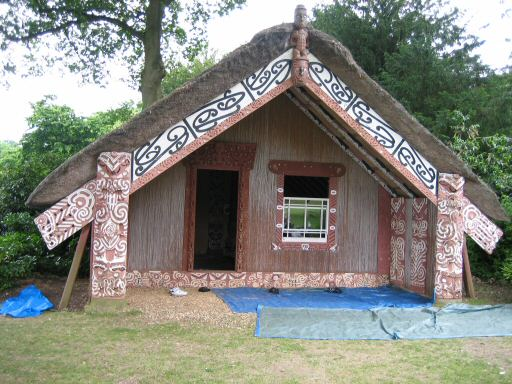
Hinemihi Meeting House as restored at its new location at Clandon Park

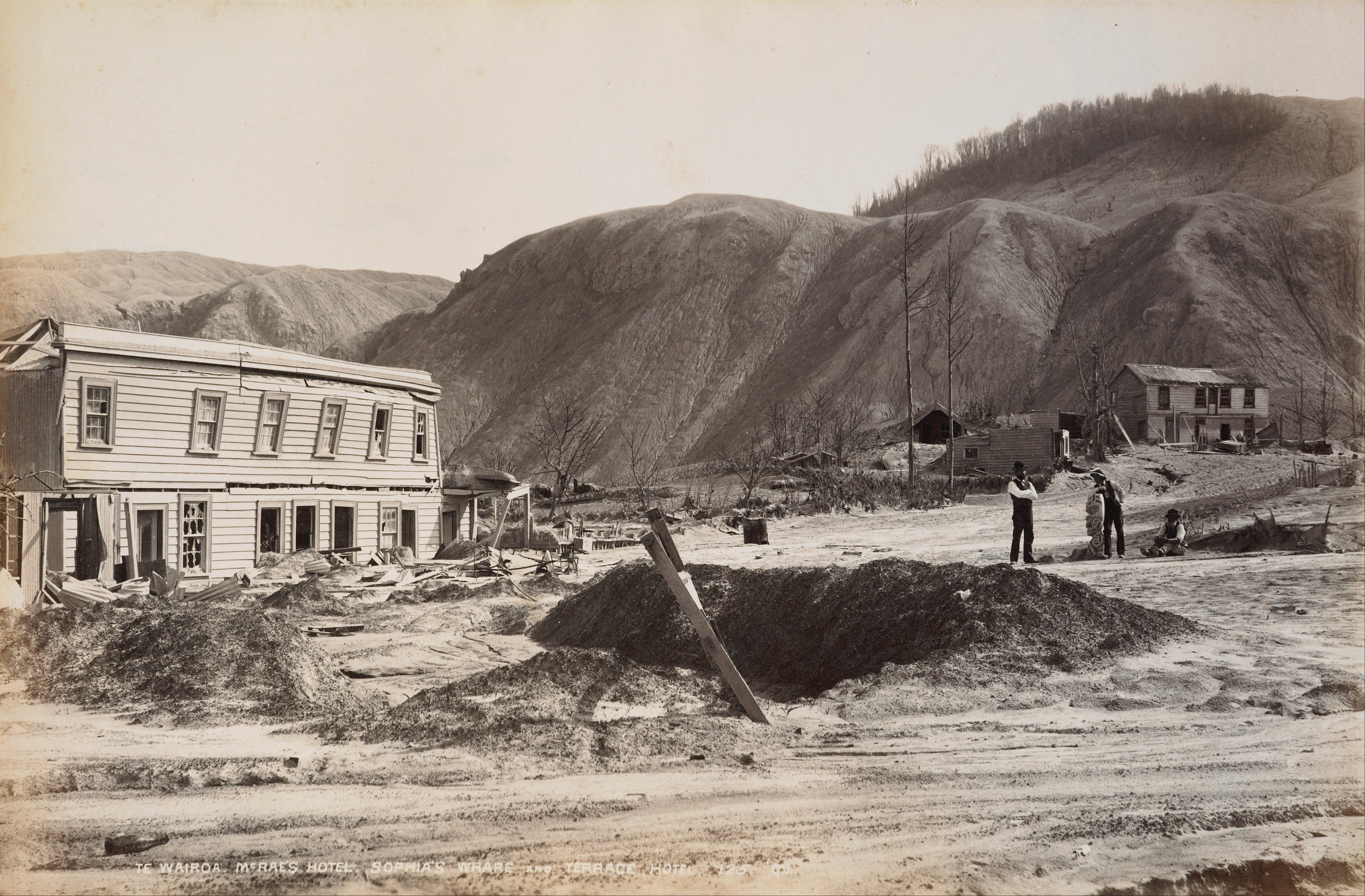
Te Wairoa, McRae's Hotel, Sophia's whare and Terrace Hotel in 1886

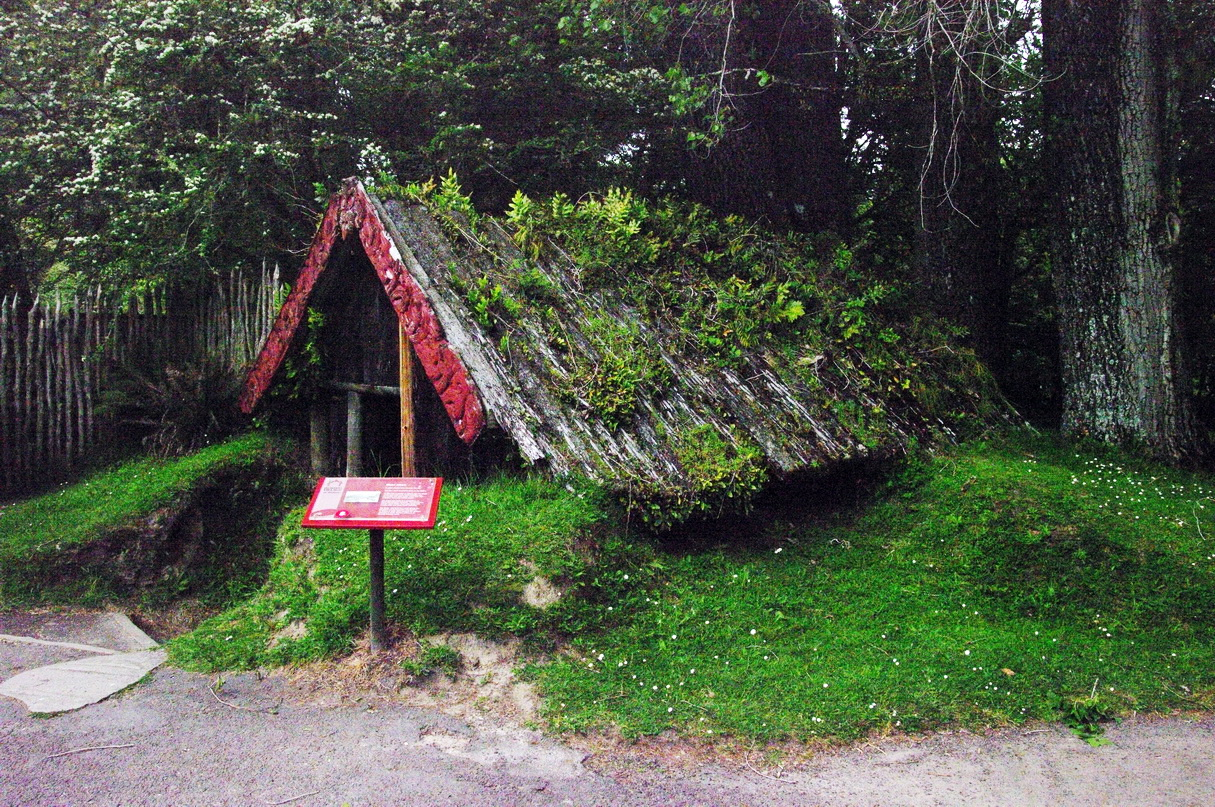
Buried village November 2009

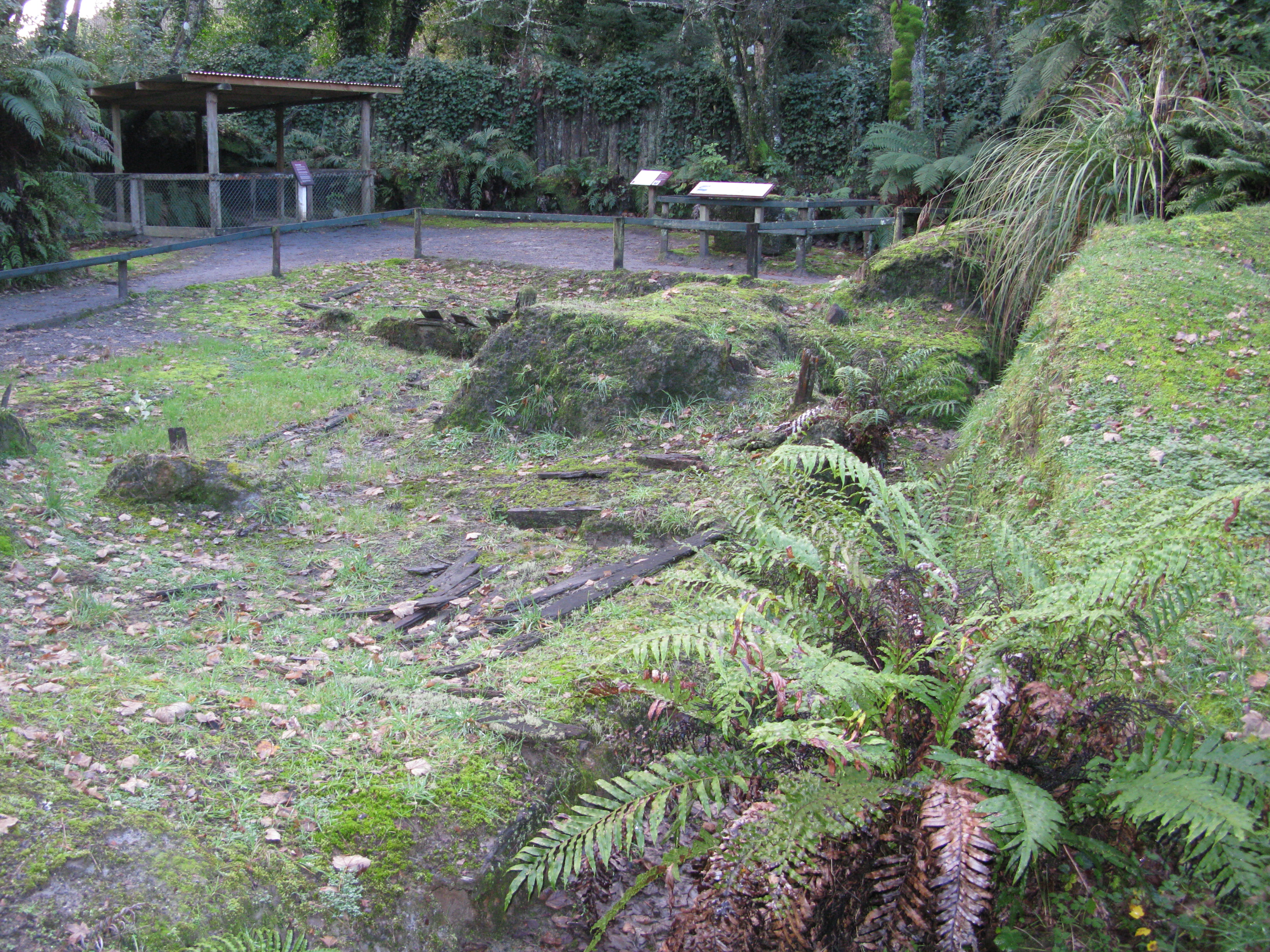
Buried village June 2011

== Wairere Falls ==
The Wairoa Stream flows on the southern edge of the village and over the Wairere Falls. The stream links Lake Rotokākahi (394.9 m (1,296 ft)) above sea level with Lake Tarawera (298 m (978 ft)) above sea level. Visitors to Te Wairoa may descend the falls via a trail with steps.

Wairere Falls at Te Wairoa
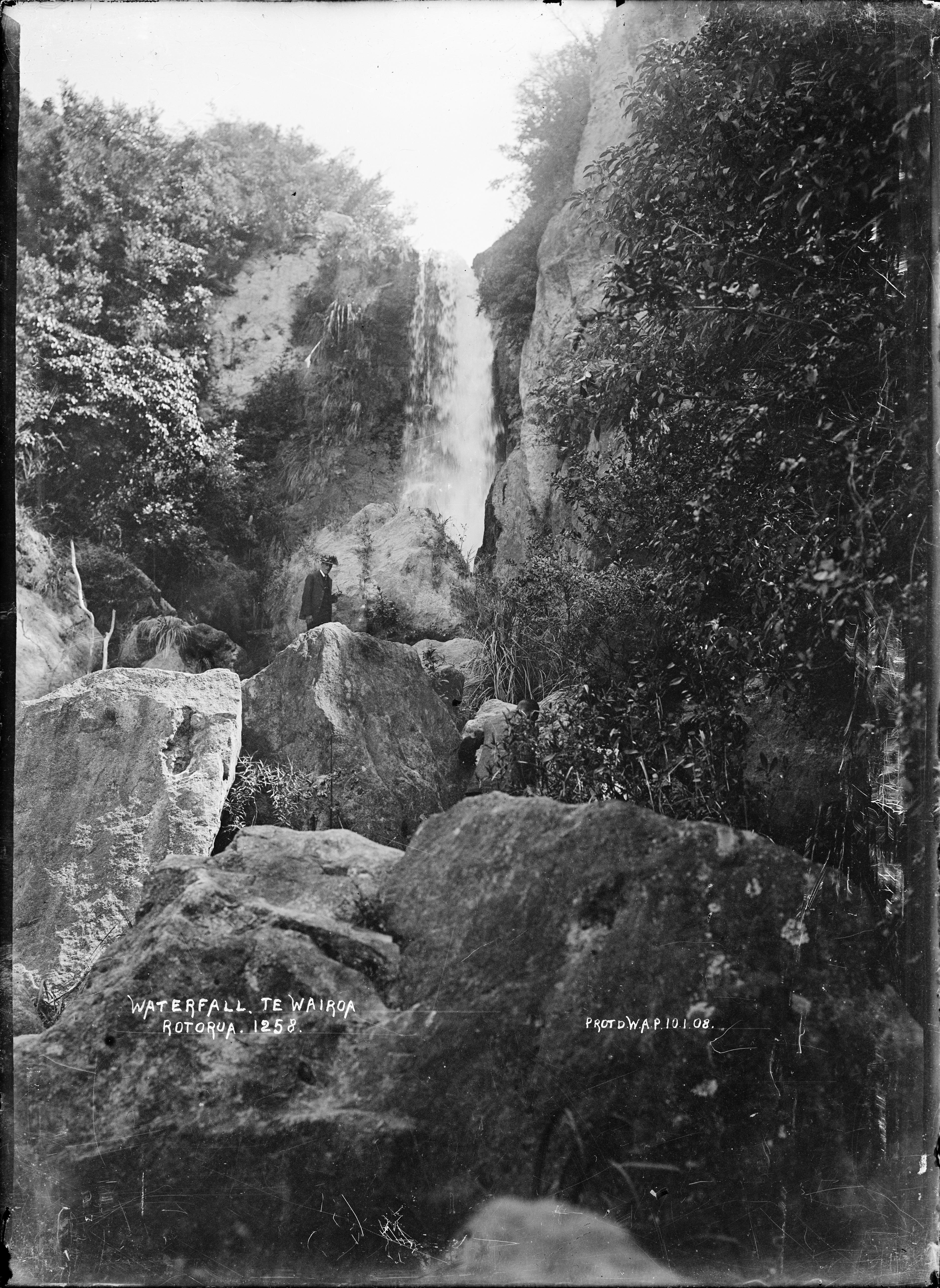
Waterfall at Te Wairoa, near Rotorua 1908

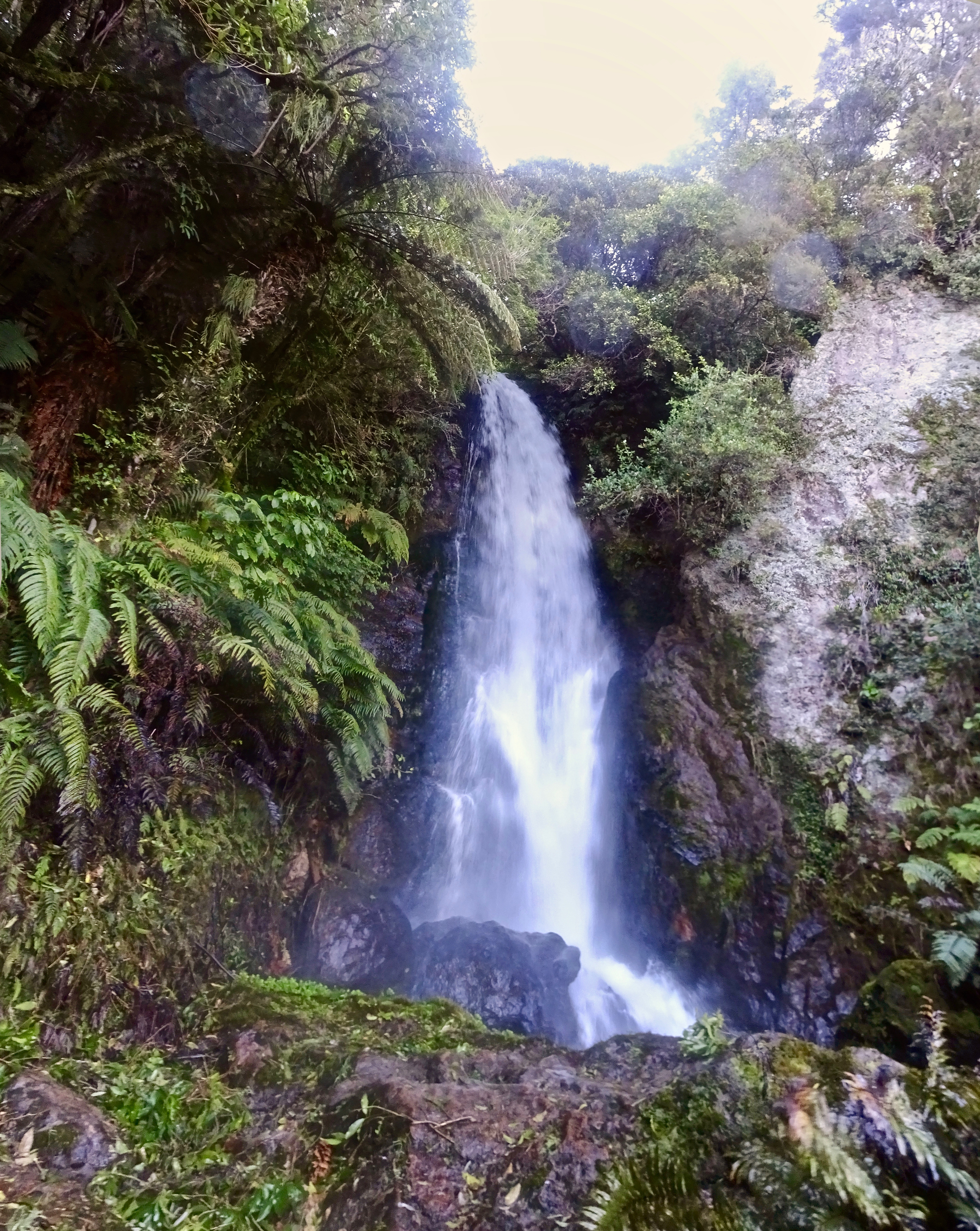
The upper fall is almost 30 m (98 ft) high

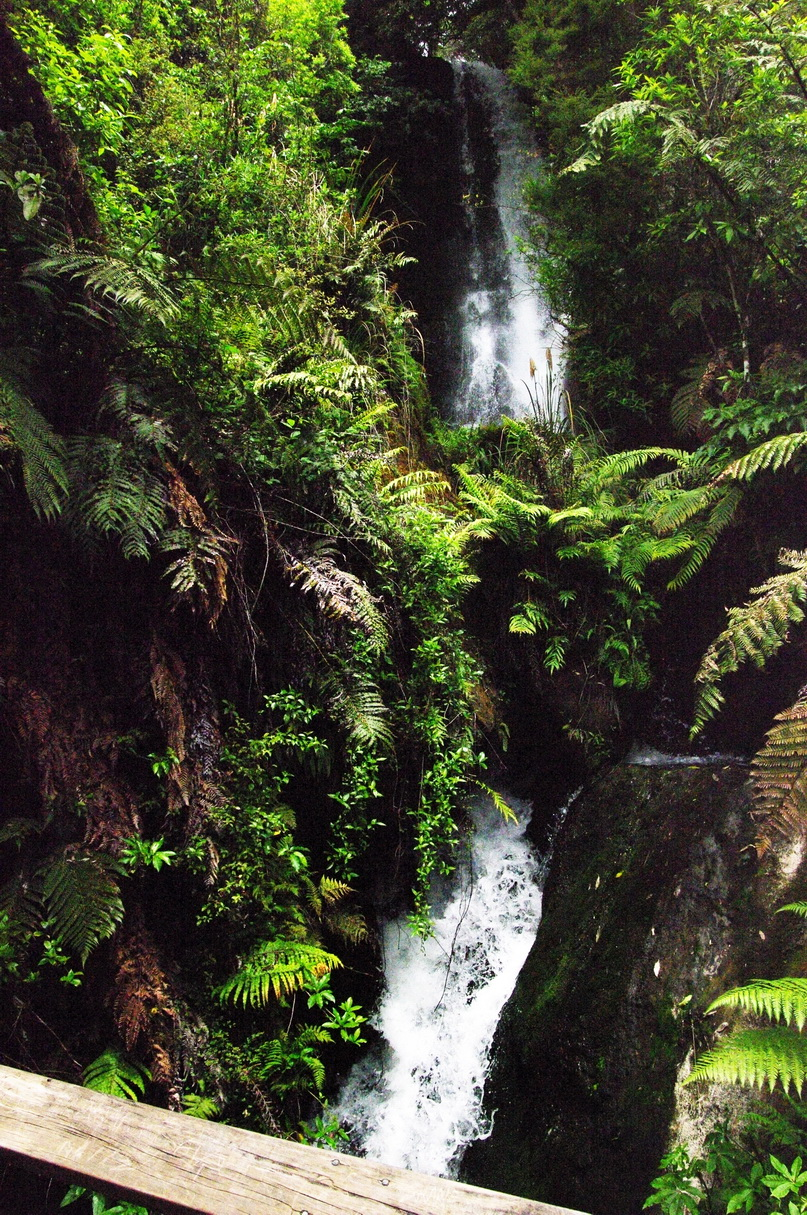
The upper and lower falls

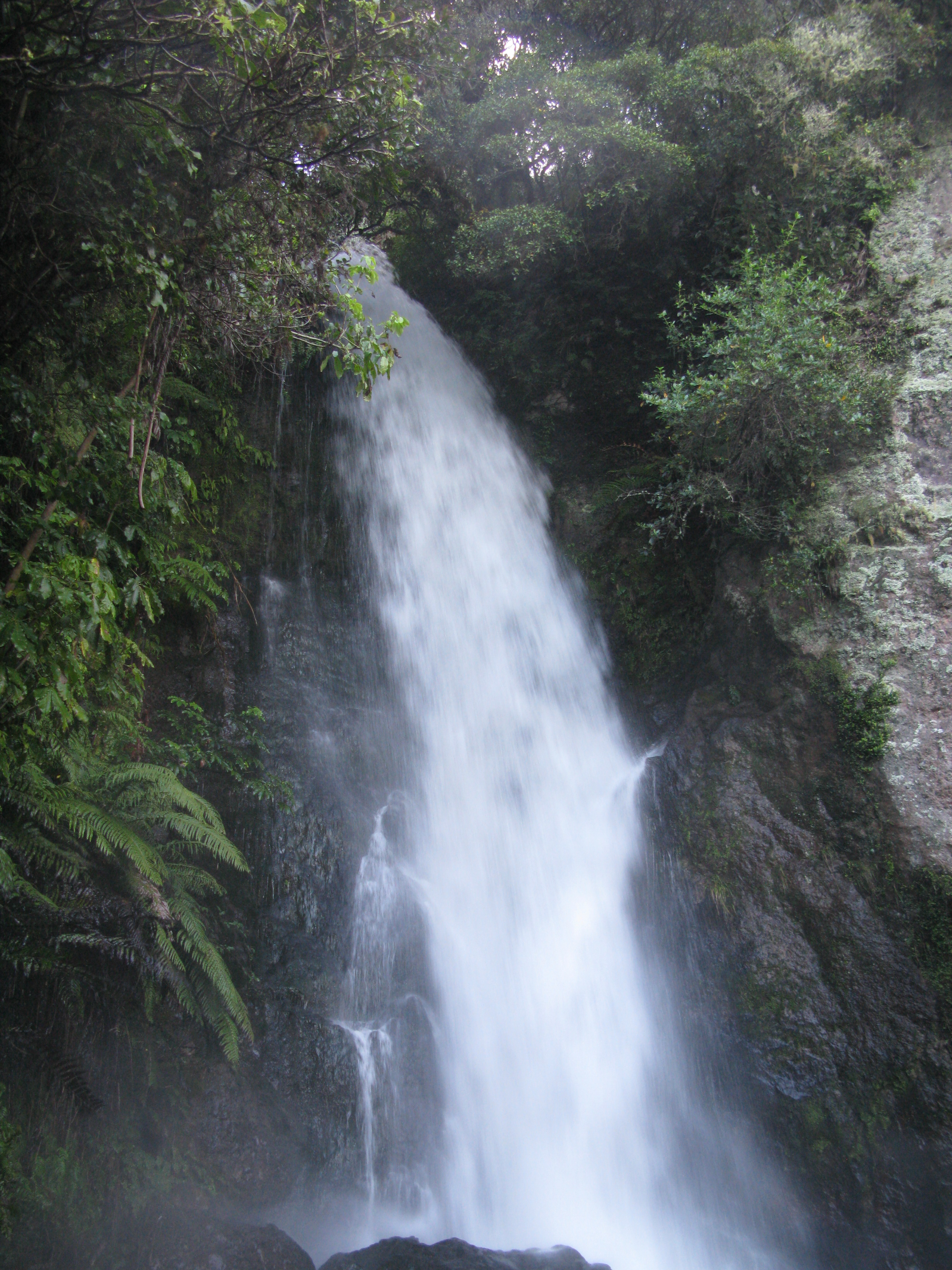
The upper falls in 2011
