= Seymour Mills Spencer =

American missionary (1812–1898)

- Born: 27 March 1812; Hartford, Connecticut, US
- Died: 30 April 1898 (aged 86); Rongotea, near Rotorua, New Zealand
- Occupation: Missionary
- Spouse: Ellen Stanley Spencer

The Reverend Seymour Mills Spencer (27 March 1812 – 30 April 1898) was born in Hartford, Connecticut. He and his wife Ellen Stanley Spencer followed an ambition to carry out the role of missionary work in New Zealand. He trained for missionary work in England at the Church Missionary Society College, Islington. The Church Missionary Society (CMS) was an evangelical organisation that was part of the Church of England.

The couple sailed on 17 January 1842 to New Zealand on the sailing vessel, Louise Campbell and arrived in Auckland. Spencer was ordained by Bishop Selwyn to be the Deacon for the district of Taupō on 24 September 1843. The ordination ceremony was conducted in the St. John the Baptist Church at Te Waimate mission.

Due to scandal over Spencer's purported advances toward a Māori girl, the couple moved from Taupō to Rotorua. From 23 November 1843 he work under the CMS missionary Thomas Chapman at the recently established CMS mission station at Te Ngae in Rotorua. In 1844 Spencer was at the Maketu mission station near Tauranga.

In 1844 the couple established the first missionary post at Lake Tarawera; working with the local Māori, in 1848 they built a European-styled community called Te Wairoa. In 1844 Spencer was suspended from the CMS for impropriety with a Māori woman. He rejoined the CMS in 1849 and was stationed at Ōpōtiki until about 1855.

Sometime after 1855 the couple returned to the Te Wairoa mission and remained there until 1870. Spencer visited Rotomahana and Te Ariki many times during his 35-year term with the CMS. His work with the local Māori helped develop the area, and he was also instrumental in assisting explorers and traders in the vicinity of Rotorua and Lake Tarawera.

Ellen Stanley Spencer died at Maketu in 1882 at the age of 65; her body was taken for burial at Kariri on the shore of Lake Tarawera. On 10 June 1886, Mount Tarawera erupted burying the surrounding communities including Kariri. Spencer died on 30 April 1898 at Rongotea and was buried at Maketu. Their son, Frederick H. Spencer, build a Spencer Family Mausoleum at Kariri; Spencer's remains were disinterred and the dedication ceremonies for the mausoleum took place on 20 February 1924.
