= Lake Rotoiti =

Lake Rotoiti is the name of two lakes in New Zealand:

- Lake Rotoiti (Bay of Plenty), in the North Island
- Lake Rotoiti (Tasman), in the South Island

== See also ==
- Rotoiti Caldera
