= Ōkāreka Embayment =

Volcano in North Island, New Zealand

- Okareka Embayment, Ōkareka Embayment
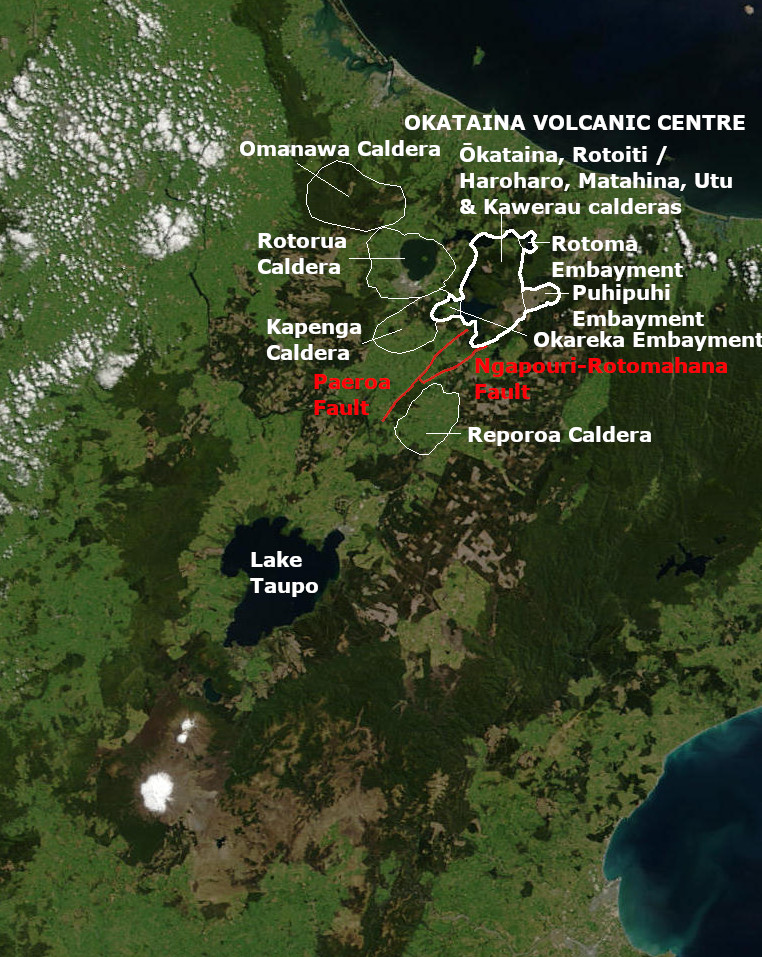
- Okataina Volcanic Centre (approximate thick white border) relationships to other nearby volcanic and tectonic structures. The Okareka Embayment is between the Haroharo Caldera to its east and the Kapenga Caldera to its west.

Highest point
- Elevation: 698 m (2,290 ft)
- Prominence: Trig 7693 Dome
- Coordinates: 38°12′08″S 176°20′54″E

Dimensions
- Width: 5 km (3.1 mi)

Geography
- Location within New Zealand Location within North Island
- Location: North Island
- Country: New Zealand
- Region: Waikato
- Range coordinates: 38°11′24″S 176°21′47″E

Geology
- Mountain type: Caldera
- Volcanic zone: Taupō Volcanic Zone
- Last eruption: 15,700 years ago

Climbing
- Access: Tarawera Road

The Ōkāreka Embayment (also spelled Okareka or Ōkareka) is a volcanic feature in Taupō Volcanic Zone of New Zealand. Its most significant recent volcanic eruption was about 15,700 years ago and this deposited the widespread Rotorua tephra that reached beyond Auckland.

== Geography ==
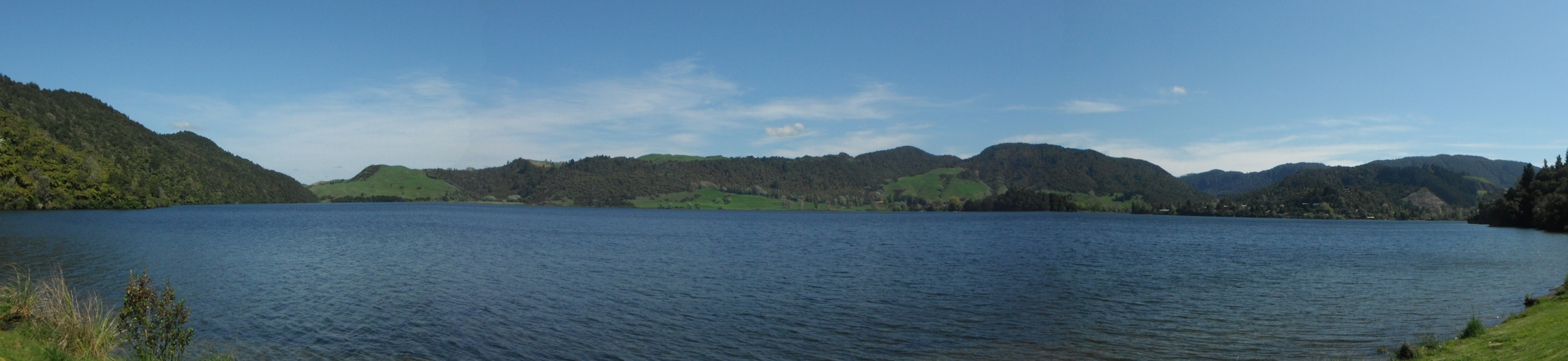
This view towards the south from the northern shore of Lake Ōkāreka takes in many of the rhyolite domes of the embayment beyond the far lake shore

The Ōkāreka Embayment extends from the western margin of Lake Tarawera to include to its north Lake Ōkāreka and in the west Lake Tikitapu and the eastern half of Lake Rotokākahi.

=== Geology ===
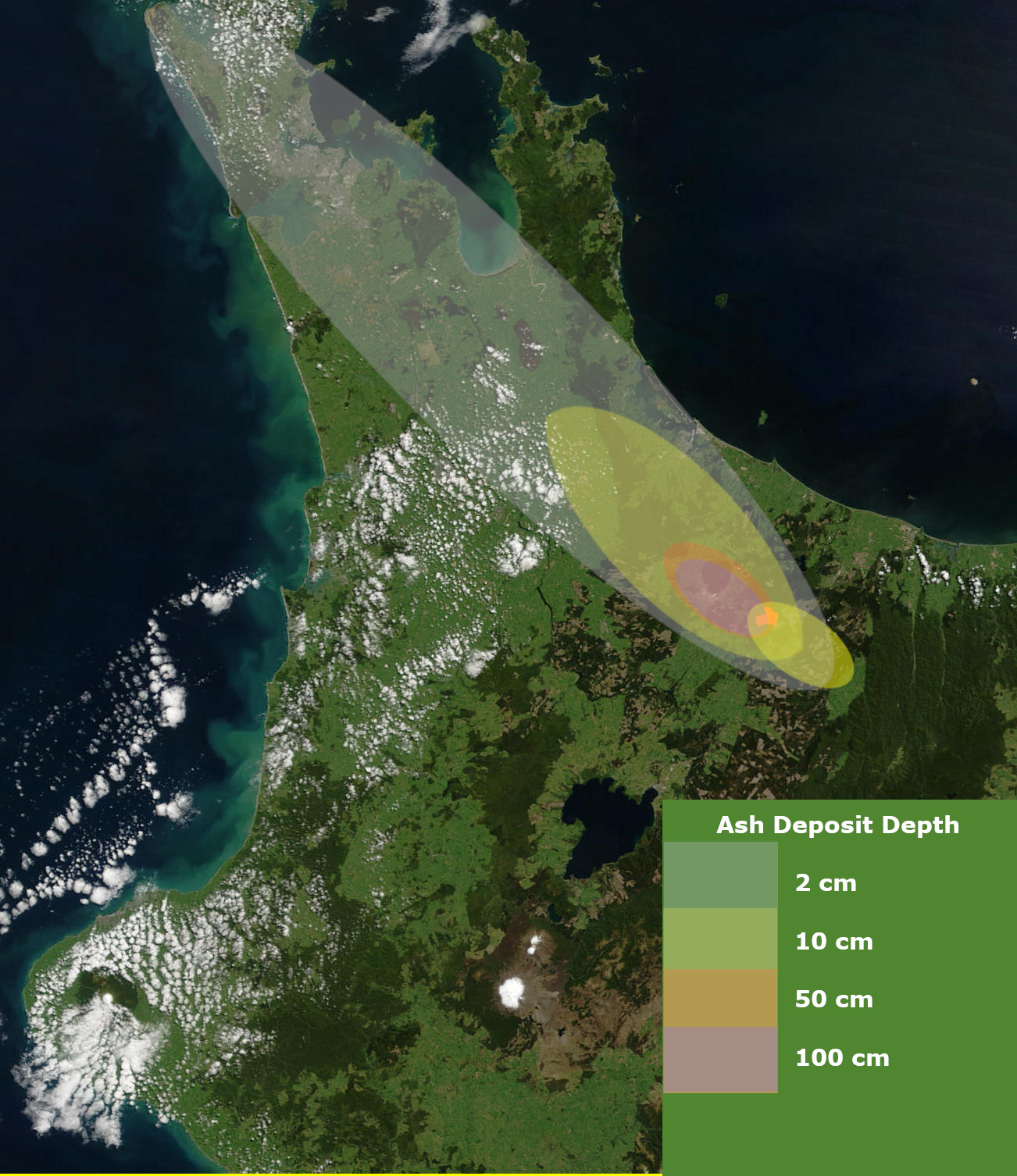
Ash distribution (towards Auckland with first phase of eruption, towards west as is more usual with prevailing winds in second smaller phase) from the Rotorua eruption of the Ōkāreka Embayment

Map centered on the Okareka Embayment (black outline to left). Shown are Ōkataina surface volcanic deposits in the years after the Rotoiti eruption with darker shading for more recent. Legend: Key for the volcanics that are shown with panning is: basalt; dacite; rhyolite / ignimbrite; █ Definite vents; Ōkataina Volcanic Centre with its embayments; postulated sub calderas of Cole et al. 2009 onwards

Both the Ōkāreka Embayment and the Tarawera volcanic complex are inside the old Ōkataina Caldera, often termed the Ōkataina volcanic centre. The caldera forming its eastern boundary has been called the Haroharo Caldera, but as no major single event formed it, this is perhaps better regarded as a general categorisation term, explaining why some maps of the Horahora Caldera include the embayment. It is now regarded as a subsidiary volcanic part of the Ōkataina Caldera related to a mechanism of collapse and subsidence at the edges of a major event caldera due to lateral movement of magma. The Ōkataina Caldera has in the last 21,000 years contributed a total magma eruptive volume greater than about 80 km^{3} (19 cu mi).

=== Eruptions ===
The Northern Dome, just to the east of Lake Tikitapu formed 25,171 ± 964 years ago in the Te Rere rhyolite eruption which also had other vents in the Ōkataina Volcanic Complex. Such domes typically form over a vent that have an initial pyroclastic eruption and the vent(s) for this eruption lies under the Northern and Eastern domes. The Te Rere tephra deposits from the initial pyroclastic eruption had a volume of 5 km^{3} (1.2 cu mi) and are widely distributed. The DRE volume of all the Te Rere eruptions totals about 11.5 km^{3} (2.8 cu mi). All the vents in the Ōkareka Embayment lie on the Haroharo linear vent zone's western end.

The Rotorua eruption now dated at 15,635 ± 412 cal.yr BP, was a two phase eruption commencing with a plinian eruption that deposited 2.6 cubic kilometres (0.62 cu mi) of material to the north-west from a vent now under the Trig 7693 dome and that lasted no more than 4 days. Significant ash cover was towards the Rotorua area (hence the name) but ash fall was as far away as Auckland with a total ash volume of 6 km^{3} (1.4 cu mi) including later minor ash deposits. The largely degassed magma body then in a dominantly effusive rhyolite dome forming process built up Trig 7693 and Middle Dome to the south east of the Ōkāreka Embayment over several years, but no more than 6, to a total volume of 0.62 cubic kilometres (0.15 cu mi). There is evidence of a Paeroa Fault rupture at the same time as deposition of the Rotorua tephra.

==== Tephra Context ====
As far back as 1839, a German explorer Dr Ernst Dieffenbach described near Rotorua the first recorded description of layered tephras from ash fall in New Zealand. However correlation between eruption years and what has been coined as tephrostratigraphy is not straightforward where there is no historical written record. Radiocarbon dating was later used in the vicinity, to date recent eruptions, as deposition of each tephra was followed by a period of quiescence and soil formation. Such a series as published in 1990 (so the dates may have been modified by scientific discourse since) reads (with some translation from original jargon) :

1. Rotomahana Mud 1886 CE (Tarawera)
2. Kaharoa 1314 CE (Tarawera)
3. Taupo 232 CE (Taupo)
4. Rotokawau 3600 years before 1950 (Rotokawau craters)
5. Whakatane 5500 years before 1950 (Haroharo)
6. Mamaku 8000 years before 1950 (Haroharo)
7. Rotoma 9500 years before 1950 (Haroharo)
8. Waiohau 14,000 years before 1950 (Tarawera)
9. Rotorua 15,600 years before 1950 (Okareka/Haroharo)
10. Rerewhakaaitu (pale layer within grayish loess deposits) 17,500 years before 1950 (Tarawera).

The impact on the Waikato region must have been marked as lake sediment from near Hamilton, New Zealand shows evidence of very active plant turnover just before almost 5 cm (2.0 in) of tephra is deposited from the Rotorua event. The soils between the tephra layers in the Ōkāreka Embayment have been analysed and are consistent with a cold dry climate between 25.2 ka to 14 ka and a more wet and warm climate since.

Okareka Tephra was produced from vents in an eruption of Mount Tarawera 23,535 ± 300 years BP, so does not have an origin in the embayment.

== Risk ==
A repeat of the Rotorua eruption with its ash distribution against the prevailing winds but towards the major population centres of Rotorua, Hamilton and Auckland would be very destructive and disruptive. The town of Rotorua would be made uninhabitable by a 0.5 metres (1 ft 8 in) ash fall, as happened in the Rotorua eruption. This would collapse all normally built homes and 60 square kilometres (23 sq mi) of land would be denuded of all vegetation.
