= Lake Rotokākahi =

Lake in the North Island of New Zealand

Lake Rotokākahi Green Lake
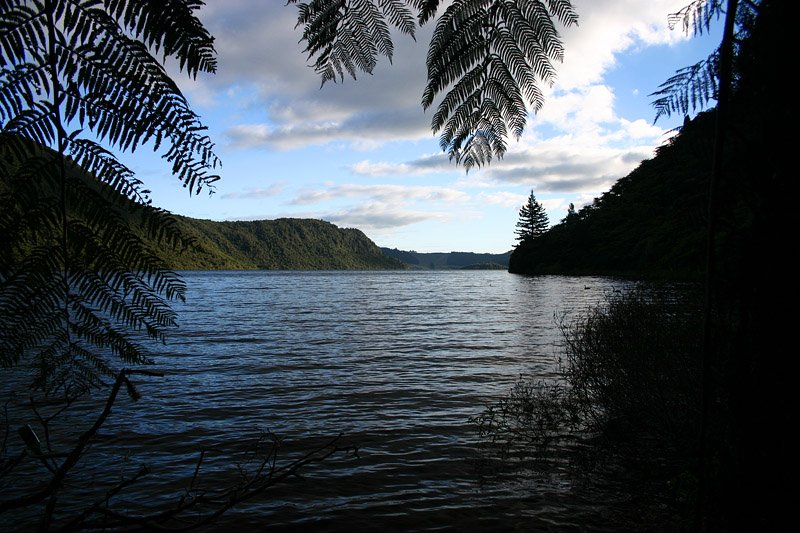
- Lake Rotokākahi

- Location within North Island
- Interactive map of Lake Rotokākahi; Green Lake
- Location: Bay of Plenty, North Island
- Coordinates: 38°13′S 176°20′E
- Type: crater lake
- Primary outflows: Wairoa Steam
- Catchment area: 27.3 km^{2} (10.5 sq mi)
- Basin countries: New Zealand
- Max. length: 4.3 km (2.7 mi)
- Max. width: 1.7 km (1.1 mi)
- Surface area: 4.3 km^{2} (1.7 sq mi)
- Average depth: 17.7 m (58 ft)
- Max. depth: 32.0 m (105.0 ft)
- Surface elevation: 394.9 m (1,296 ft)
- Islands: Punaruku Island, Motutawa Island

Lake Rotokākahi or Green Lake, is one of four small lakes lying between Lake Rotorua and Lake Tarawera in the Bay of Plenty Region of New Zealand's North Island. The others are Lake Tikitapu (Blue Lake), Lake Ōkāreka, and Lake Ōkataina. All lie within the Ōkataina Caldera, along its western edge.

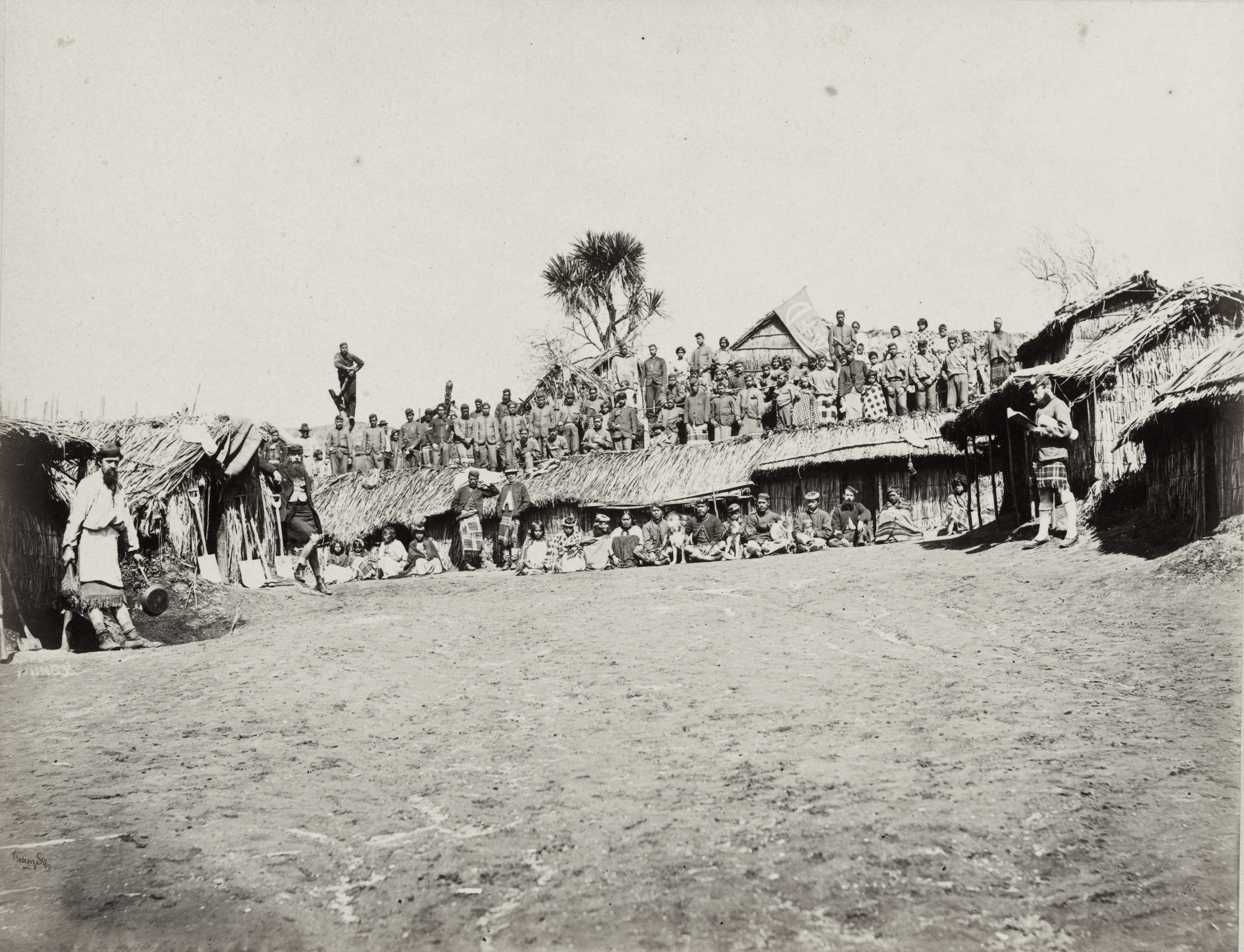
The Arawa fighting contingent, Rotokakahi (Green Lake), Aotearoa-New Zealand, 1870

== Geography ==
The lake flows to Lake Tarawera via the Wairoa Stream (also known as Te Wairoa) past the buried Te Wairoa village and its Wairere waterfall. The Wairoa Stream when it leaves Lake Rotokākahi has a mean flow rate of 310.6 L/s (10.97 cu ft/s) but it picks up subsurface water and tributaries so when it enters Lake Tarawera it has a mean flow rate of 347 L/s (12.3 cu ft/s). From the air the lake looks emerald green related to its shallow, sandy bottom. The lake is 394 m (1,293 ft) above sea level and 24 m (79 ft) below the level of the neighbouring Lake Tikitapu to its north. Its eastern arm is separated from Lake Tikitapu by a lava dam generated during a rhyolitic eruption, at the south-western margins of the Ōkataina Caldera now dated at 15,635 ± 412 cal.yr BP,. It contains a small island in its western arm, Punaruku Island and its southern arm has a larger island Motutawa Island. While the catchment flows into the Tarawera River watershed in due course, the south-western aspect of the lake is only a very short distance from the Waikato River watershed.

== Ecology ==
It is named for its abundance of kākahi (freshwater mussels).

The lake had brown trout introduced in the 1870s. Rainbow trout were introduced later.

The lake is classified as mesotrophic, with moderate productivity and water quality, but has not been assessed recently. Its trophic level index was 3.6 in 2014 which was a decline and relatively high for a local lake. This may be because 26.3% of its catchment was pasture in 2007.

== History ==
The main tribe occupying the Lake Rotokakahi area at the time of European settlement were the Tuhourangi/Ngati Tumatawera, who had migrated from the Rotoiti area following various feuds with neighbouring tribes. During early European settlement Kaiteriria on the southern lake shore was a base for armed constabulary. The lake has been under the authority of the Te Arawa iwi, Tūhourangi and Ngati Tumatawera since 1948, when there was disturbance of the tapu, and remains largely undisturbed

== Motutawa ==
This small island in the lake is notable as the site of the 1822 slaughter of a part of Ngāpuhi, as an act of vengeance for relatives killed by the same Ngapuhi warriors in Te Totara, Thames. This led to the revenge raid of Hongi Hika in 1823. The island was the main historic stronghold of Tuhourangi/Ngati Wahiao, and tradition has it as the resting place of the bones of Hinemoa.

The New Zealand Ministry for Culture and Heritage gives a translation of "tawa tree island" for Motutawa.

== Images ==
Lake Rotokākahi views
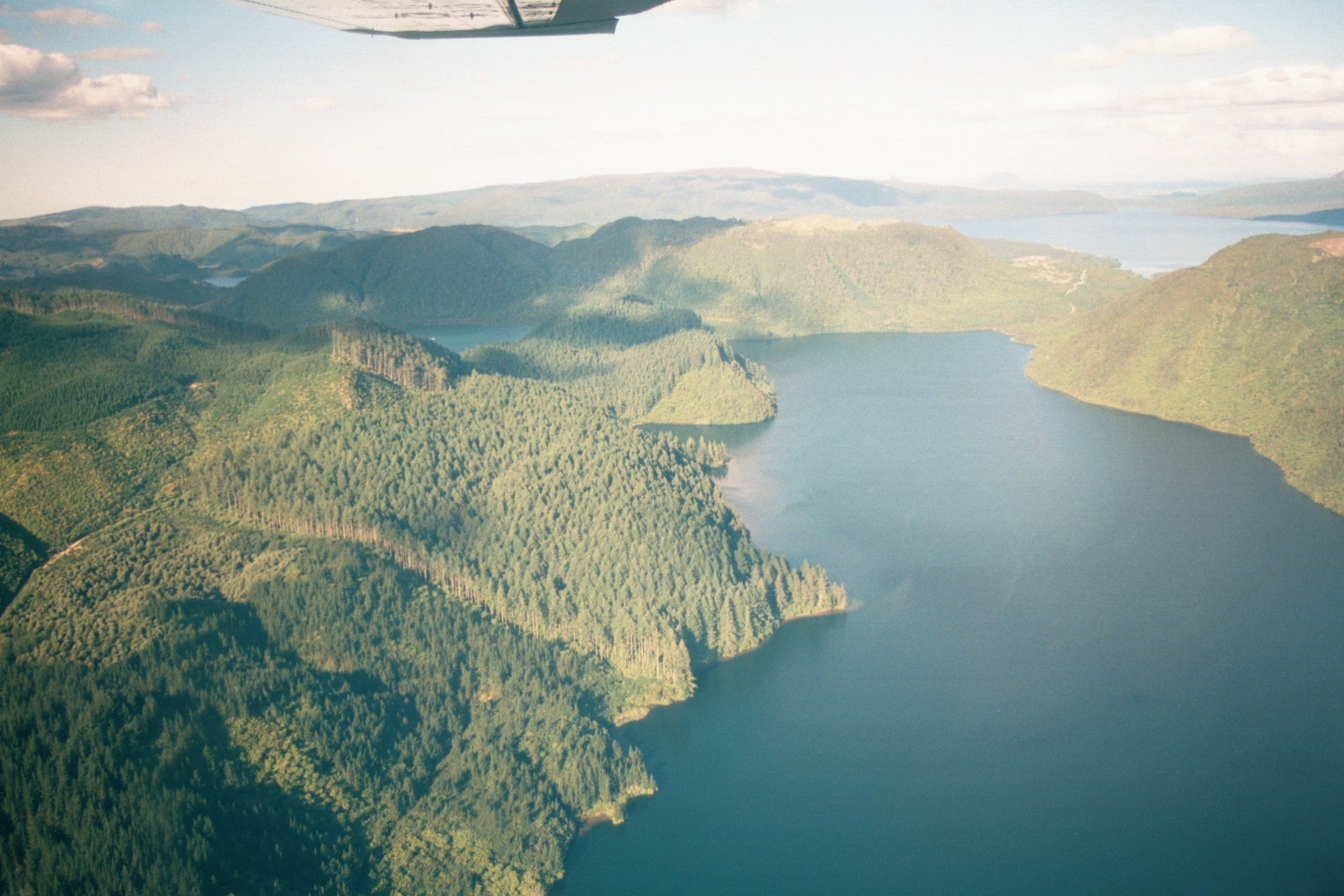
Aerial view (Lake Tarawera is in the upper right)

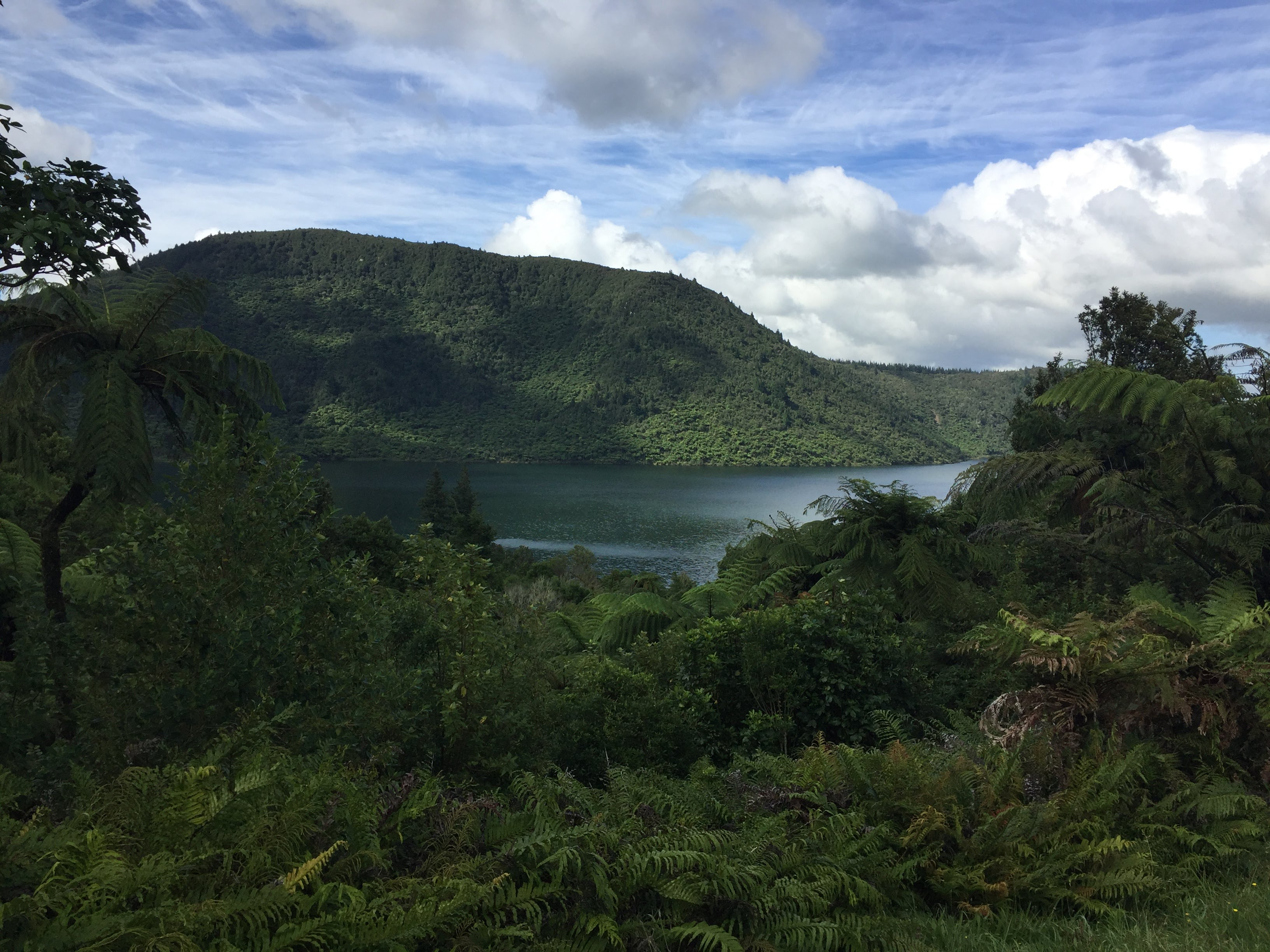
View of Lake Rotokākahi February 2018

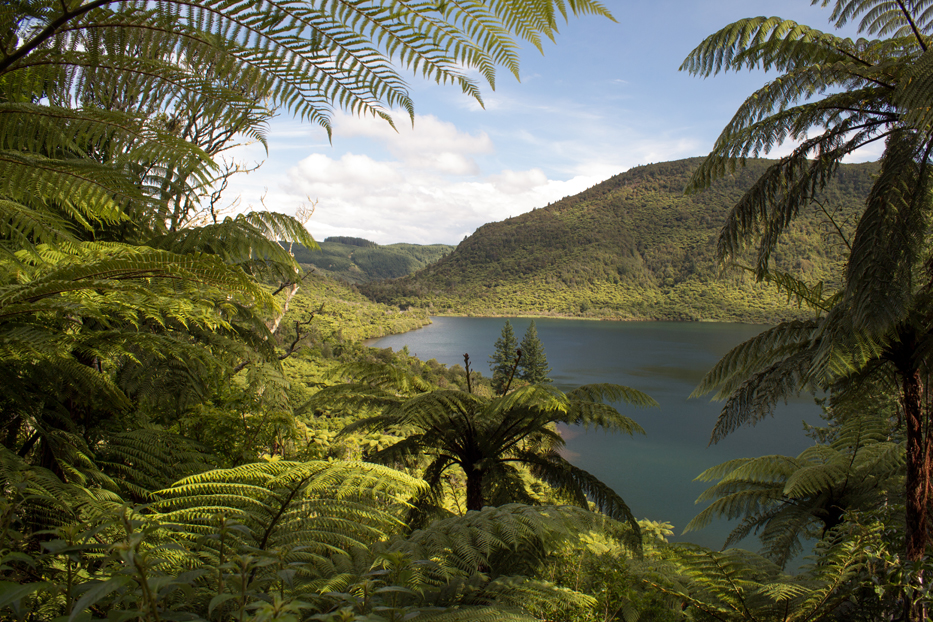
View of Lake Rotokākahi 2012

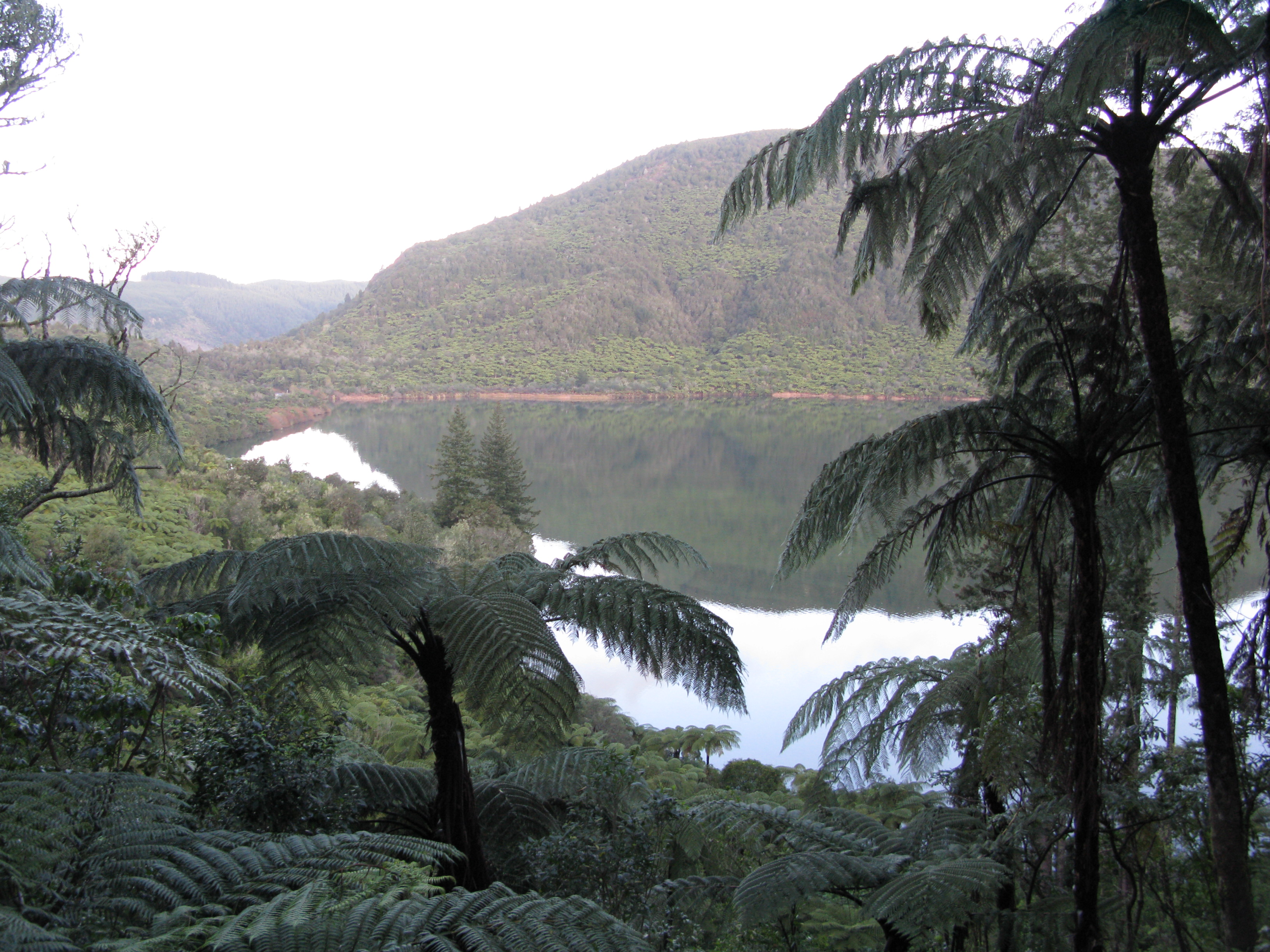
View of Lake Rotokākahi June 2011

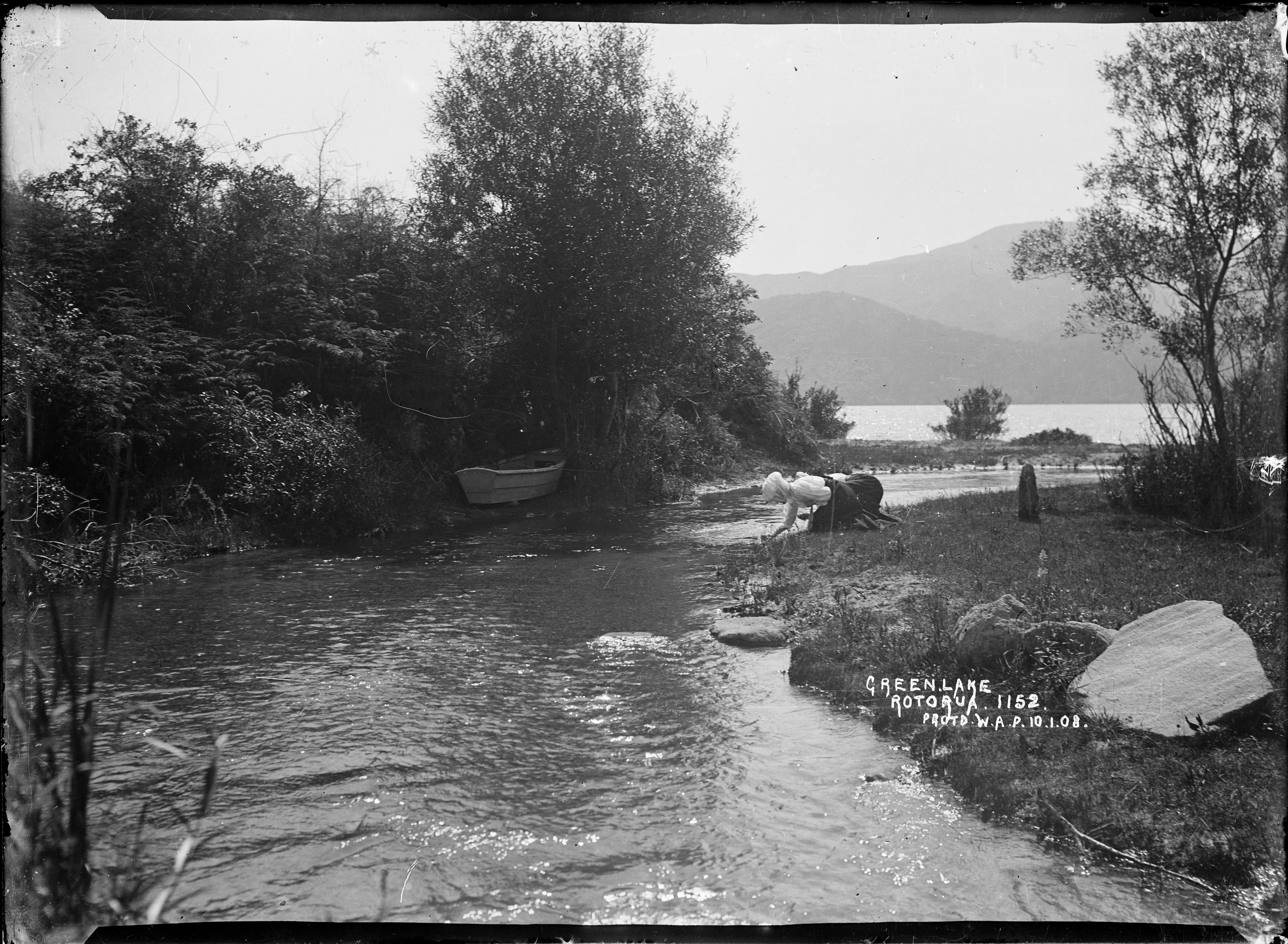
1908 view of stream running into Lake Rotokākahi

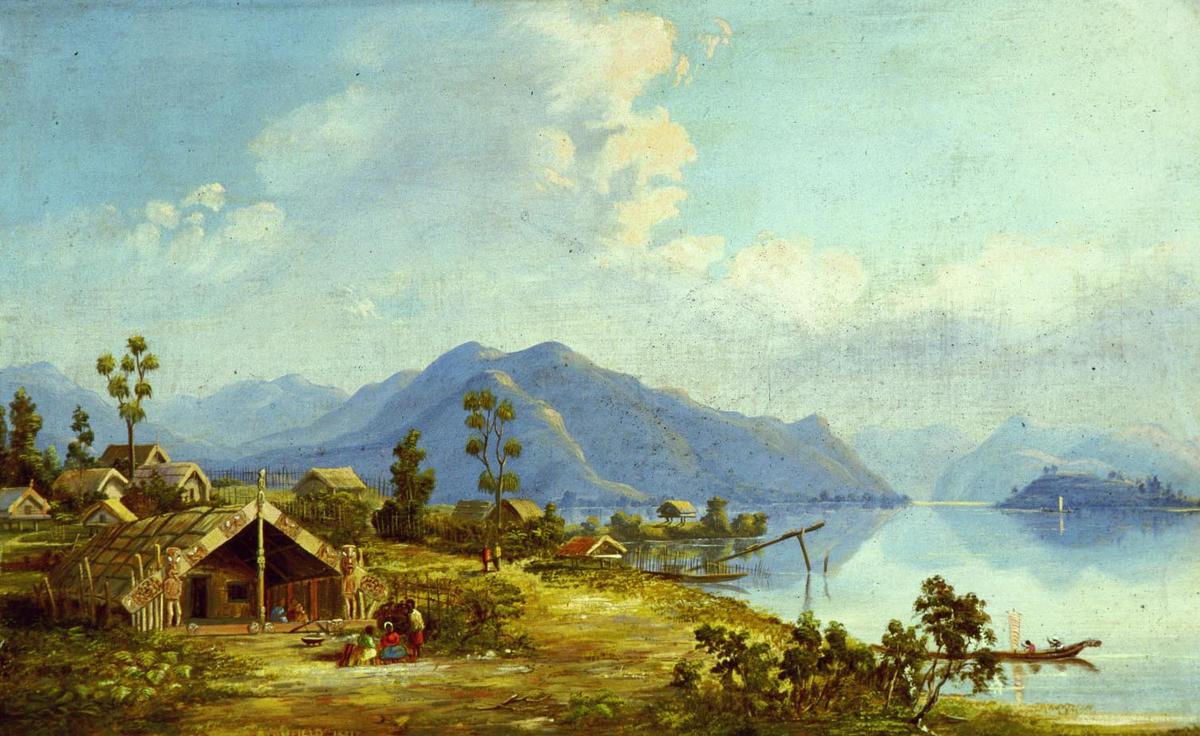
View of Lake Rotokākahi from Kaitereria Village in 1881 by Charles Blomfield
