= Puhipuhi Embayment =

Volcanic area in North Island, New Zealand

- Puhipuhi Basin
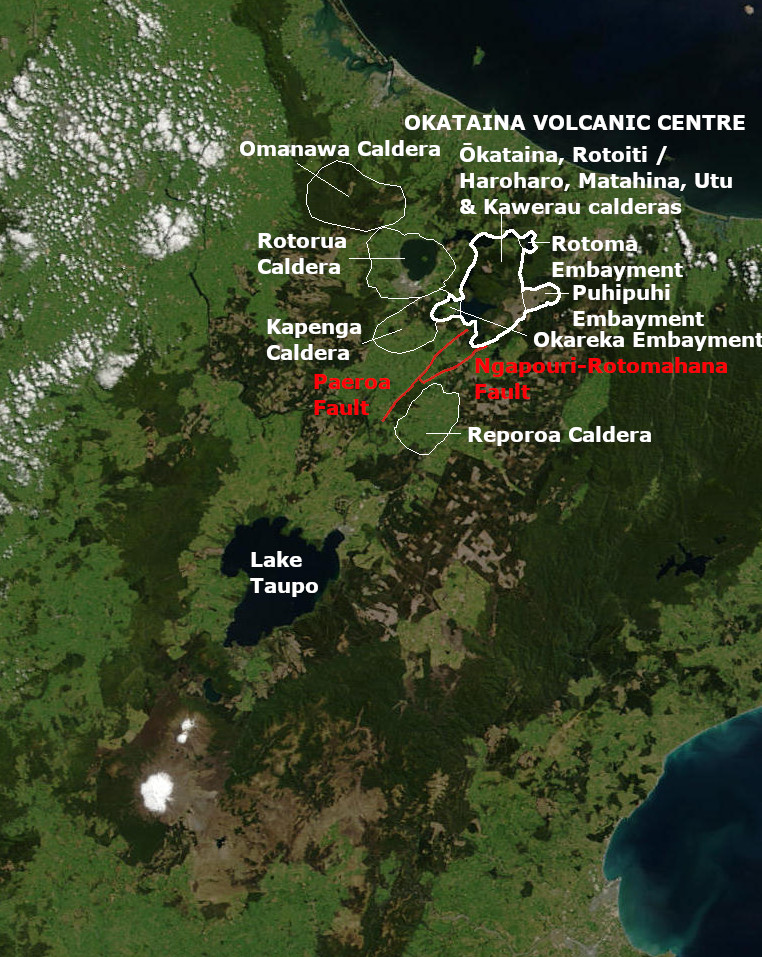
- Okataina Volcanic Centre (approximate thick white border) relationships to other nearby volcanic and tectonic structures. The Puhipuhi Embayment is to its east.

Highest point
- Elevation: 364 m (1,194 ft)
- Prominence: Puhipuhi
- Coordinates: 38°10′41″S 176°36′27″E

Dimensions
- Width: 8 km (5.0 mi)

Geography
- Location within New Zealand Location within North Island
- Location: North Island
- Country: New Zealand
- Region: Waikato
- Range coordinates: 38°10′37″S 176°36′00″E

Geology
- Rock age: Pleistocene (0.051–0.029 Ma)
- Mountain type: Caldera collapse
- Volcanic zone: Taupō Volcanic Zone
- Last eruption: 31,500 ± 5,200 years ago (Note: The age of Kawerau ignimbrite in the middle of the Puhipuhi Embayment was established by Spinks in 2005 to be 33 ka, a major revision on Beresford & Cole who in 2000 had reclassified it from Kaingaroa ignimbrite but retained a much older age of 240 ka based on other sampling of ignimbrite. Spinks noted that the composition of Kawerau ignimbrite was identical to the unit I eruptives of the Mangaone subgroup tephra, which had been independently dated and was distinct from the other layers. Danišík in 2020 updated the dates and composition of the 13 Mangaone subgroup tephras and this revised, more accurate date than the methodology available to Spinks is used here. The methodology of the Lowe/Danišík group gives earlier ages to the Rotoiti tephra than the other dating methods used on Rotoiti ignimbrite although confidence limits almost overlap. For technical reasons the Lowe/Danišík results are now consistent at younger ages but are believed by some to underestimate ages from about the 50 ka mark. For reference since the Rotoiti and Manganone subgroup eruptives are found in the embayment, the current Lowe/Danišík Bayesian age sequence model as of 2020 dates the Rotoiti eruptives at 46.8 ka (51 - 43.8), Unit A of Manganone subgroup to 42.7 ka (46.4 - 39.2) and Unit L of Manganone subgroup to 30.6 ka (31.2 - 29.1). For more on this age issue see notes to Ōkataina Caldera and Rotoiti Caldera.)

Climbing
- Access: Restricted

The Puhipuhi Embayment (also Puhipuhi Basin) is a volcanic feature in the Taupō Volcanic Zone of New Zealand associated with the collapse of the Ōkataina Caldera wall to its west. Its latest significant volcanic eruption was about 31,500 years ago and this dating required a reassessment of recent activity at the eastern extension of the Tarawera vent alignment.

== Geography ==
The Puhipuhi Embayment extends from the eastern margin of Mount Tarawera towards Kawerau including land mostly devoted to the Tarawera forest portion of the Kaingaroa Forest. The basin is a dissected plateau at about 200 m (660 ft) above sea level. The Tarawera River cuts through the north of the basin and is its drainage.

=== Geology ===
Map centered on the Pupipuhi Embayment (black outline to right). Shown are Ōkataina surface volcanic deposits in the years after the Rotoiti eruption with darker shading for more recent. Legend: Key for the volcanics that are shown with panning is: basalt; dacite; rhyolite / ignimbrite; █ Definite vents; Ōkataina Volcanic Centre with its embayments; postulated sub calderas of Cole et al. 2009 onwards

Both the Pupipuhi Embayment and the Tarawera volcanic complex are part of the Ōkataina volcanic centre. There is a long eruptive history with the likelihood that some of the 13 Mangaone subgroup eruptions were from vents in the embayment and the only dacite eruptives from this centre occur in the south of the embayment. Volcanism within and near such collapse structure embayments associated with the volcanic centre are predominately rhyolitic. Matahina ignimbrite is exposed north of the Tarawera River in the embayment, Rotoiti ignimbrite at its southern margins and Kawerau ignimbrite at its centre. The basin's Kawerau ignimbrite is dated to about 31.5 ka and overlies both the much older Matahina ignimbrite (about 280 ka), the relatively recent Rotoiti ignimbrite and also most of the tephras of the 43-31 ka Mangaone subgroup. Kawerau ignimbrite is the youngest partially-welded ignimbrite in the Taupō Volcanic Zone. Puhipuhi dacite is found in a small cone and lavas that were intruded in to lake sediments and is usually overlain by Mangaone subgroup tephras and assigned to about a thousand years before the Rotoiti eruption as they are overlaid by this as well. Utu ignimbrites are exposed in small outcrops within the Puhipuhi embayment.

== Activity ==
An example of probably basaltic dyke intrusion that never reached the surface, but propagated towards Mount Tarawera, was manifest as an earthquake swarm under the embayment during a 2019 period of volcanic unrest.
