= Haroharo Caldera =

Postulated volcanic caldera, within another older volcanic caldera in New Zealand

The Haroharo Caldera (Haroharo volcanic complex) is a 26 by 16 km (16.2 by 9.9 mi) postulated volcanic feature in Taupō Volcanic Zone of the North Island, New Zealand within the larger and older Ōkataina Caldera. Since 2010 further studies have tended to use the terms Haroharo vent alignment, Utu Caldera, Matahina Caldera, Rotoiti Caldera and a postulated Kawerau Caldera to the features assigned to it. However the name is used in the peer reviewed literature to summarise and group these features based on gravitational and magnetic features.

== Geography ==
In the north the Haroharo Caldera has been mapped as extending from the eastern half of Lake Rotoiti to the western border of Lake Rotomā. Its southern extent was defined by the Tarawera volcano. A recent analysis is consistent with the south western structural boundary of the older single event caldera's being in the eastern portions of Lake Tarawera. Both the Ōkāreka Embayment and the Tarawera Volcanic Complex are adjacent, so many, especially older maps, had these features overlapping the Haroharo Caldera or Okataina caldera as part of the Haroharo volcanic complex or Ōkataina volcanic centre.

=== Geology ===
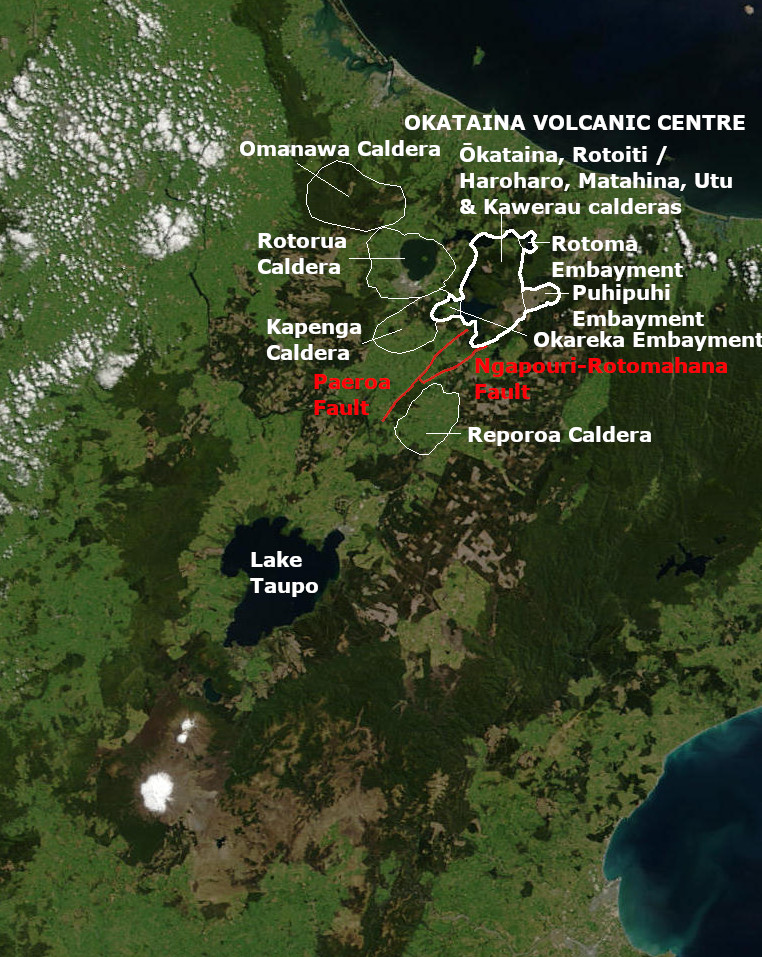
Okataina Volcanic Centre (approximate thick white border) relationships to other nearby volcanic and tectonic structures. The Haroharo Caldera was contained within and extends from its north to south

The Haroharo Caldera was within the older and larger Ōkataina Caldera and its boundaries in geological terms are related mainly to the Matahina and Rotoiti sub-calderas which were formed in single eruption sequences. These boundaries relate to events that happened before about 45,000 years ago. It is therefore not regarded now as a caldera in its own right formed by one single event and there have been many attempts to rationalise the literature from a descriptor used since at least 1962. (Note: The following is recorded in the geology literature: HaroHaro pile ... are rhyolite lavas of the Okataina Volcanic Centre, extruded on the floor of Haroharo Caldera — J. Healy, Geology of the Rotoroa District 1962, p54-55 with the author presuming that certain ignimbrites came from this source.) There have been multiple significant eruptions from the Haroharo vent line, that is parallel and to the north of the Mount Tarawera vent line and also within the Ōkataina Caldera. There has been a large amount of dome infilling that refer to the Haroharo name, but the term Ōkataina complex volcano is felt by many to be a better name than the Haroharo volcano to understand the processes that have happened in this portion of the Taupō Volcanic Zone.

Within the Haroharo vent line there was a VEI-5 volcanic eruption about 6060 BCE producing about 17 km^{3} (4.1 cu mi) of eruptive material and one about 2000 years later that produced 13 km^{3} (3.1 cu mi) of material. With its linear parallel young vent alignment to those of the similarly young in geological terms, Tarawera volcano, and related magma sources, this means it is now usually regarded as a subsidiary volcanic part of the Ōkataina Caldera which in the last 21,000 years has contributed a total magma eruptive volume greater than about 80 km^{3} (19 cu mi).
