= Lake Tikitapu =

Crater lake in New Zealand

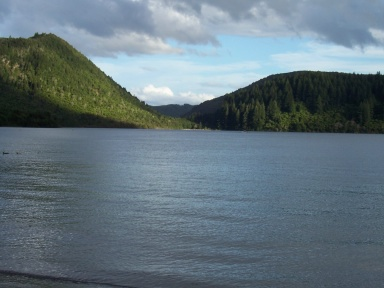
- Lake Tikitapu

- Location within North Island
- Interactive map of Lake Tikitapu
- Location: North Island
- Coordinates: 38°12′S 176°20′E
- Type: crater lake
- Catchment area: 6.2 km^{2} (2.4 sq mi)
- Basin countries: New Zealand
- Max. length: 1.6 km (0.99 mi)
- Max. width: 1.3 km (0.81 mi)
- Surface area: 1.4 km^{2} (0.54 sq mi)
- Average depth: 19.1 m (63 ft)
- Max. depth: 27.5 m (90 ft)
- Surface elevation: 417.3 m (1,369 ft)

Lake Tikitapu, more commonly known as Blue Lake, is the smallest of four small lakes lying between Lake Rotorua and Lake Tarawera in the Bay of Plenty Region of New Zealand. The other three are Lake Rotokakahi (Green Lake), Lake Ōkāreka, and Lake Ōkataina.

The lake is named in English for its stunning aqua blue colour, which can be attributed to the pumice and rhyolite that lies on the lake bed.

== Geography ==
Lake Tikitapu is south-east of Rotorua over a saddle and surrounded by native forest covered hills. The lake has a mean autumn height of 417.3 metres (1,369 ft) above sea level. The lake has a flat bed and, as a collapsed volcanic crater, it only has a maximum depth of 27.5 m (90 ft). There are no permanent surface outflows and only a seep near the northern end may be a permanent inflow. The lake is 1.4 km^{2} (0.54 sq mi) in size, with a catchment size of 620 hectares, giving a modelled catchment precipitation inflow of 302 L/s (10.7 cu ft/s).

=== Geology ===
Lake Tikitapu was formed as the result of a lava dam generated during the Rotoroa rhyolitic eruption sequence, at the south-western margins of the Ōkataina Caldera now dated at 15,635 ± 412 cal.yr BP, which separates it from Lake Rotokakahi to the south. The lake is closely related to the Ōkāreka Embayment on the western margins of the Ōkataina Caldera and it is possible that the Te Rere rhyolite eruption of 25,171 ± 964 years BP was also relevant to its formation.

== Activities and leisure ==
On the lake, swimming, boating, trout fishing and watersports are popular activities. Both rainbow trout and brook trout reside in the lake, making it very popular with experienced and recreational fishers.

Popular with both locals and visitors; walking and biking tracks surround the lake. The 5.5 km Blue Lake walking track circles the lake and weaves through native bush and exotic conifers of the Whakarewarewa Forest. The track comes to an end, reaching the beaches at the end of the lake. The track has been graded as easy, with the average walker taking an hour and thirty minutes to complete the track. The Tangaroamihi biking trail connects Lake Tikitapu to the Whakarewarewa Forest mountain bike trail network. It is a grade 2, 2.5 km trail.

The available facilities at Lake Tikitapu include BBQ's and picnic tables, children's playgrounds, ski lanes and boat ramps and public toilets, making it a popular choice for families.

Lake Tikitapu hosts numerous events throughout the year; these events range from rowing regattas, wakeboarding competitions, waka ama events and many more.

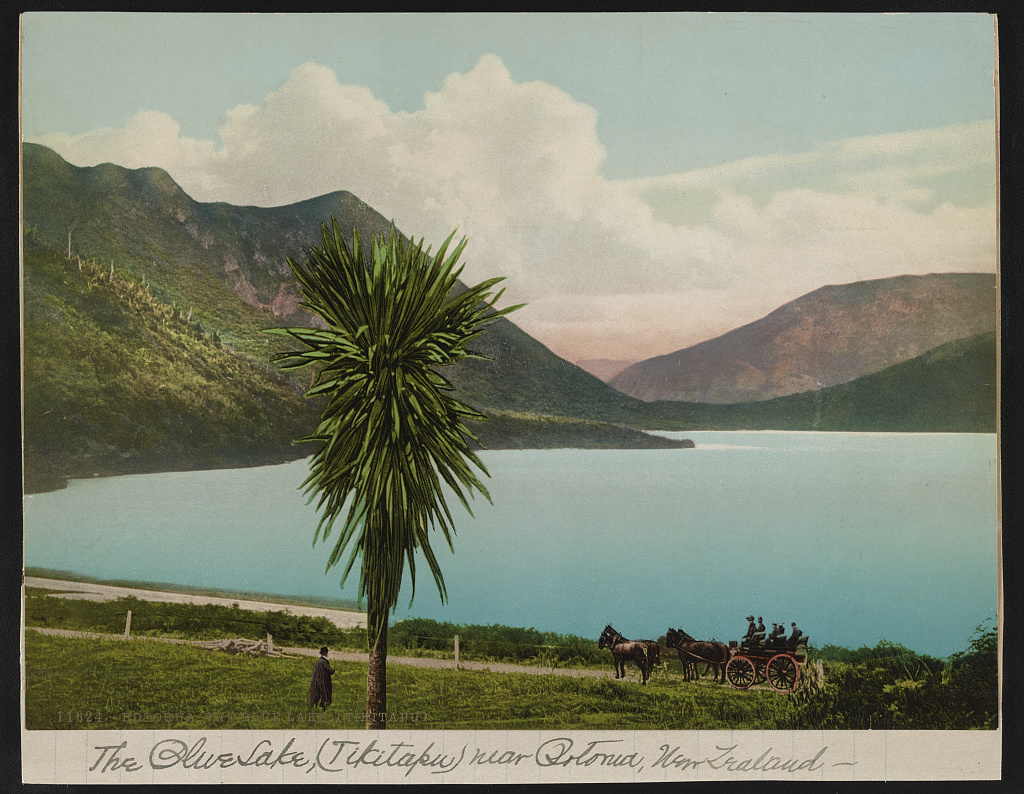
Lake Tikitapu

== History ==
Lake Tikitapu is immersed in Māori history. The name Tikitapu refers to a sacred greenstone, or pounamu, necklace that is believed to have been worn by a daughter of a high ranking chief. It is understood that the daughter lost the necklace as she bathed in the crystal waters.

New Zealand flatwater canoeist, Lisa Carrington, has competed in events numerous times at Blue Lake regattas. In 2018, she won all six of her events, and in 2020 Carrington won both the K1 (single kayak) 200m and K1 500m finals.

=== Legend of Kataore ===
Māori legend also surrounds the lake. Legend says that the Taniwha monster, named Kataore, lived in Lake Tikitapu. Kataore's initial loveable nature had changed as he grew up, and he became a mischievous taniwha who preyed on lone travellers. He was known to devour unsuspecting travelers in one gulp.

Kataore's actions were getting out of hand, and he soon felt the rage of the neighbouring tribes. Kataore later made a detrimental mistake; he swallowed the chief's daughter, as she was on her way to be wed to a young chief, Reretoi. After hearing of this disaster, Reretoi assembled 140 bold warriors to seek revenge. Reretoi and his men managed to draw Kataore out of his cave and noose his neck, attack and slay him with tewhatewha and kotiate. Kataore's body was stripped of his flesh, and his heart was eaten by the tohunga between the Blue and Green Lakes.
