= Lake Ōkareka =

Lake Ōkāreka
- Lake Okareka
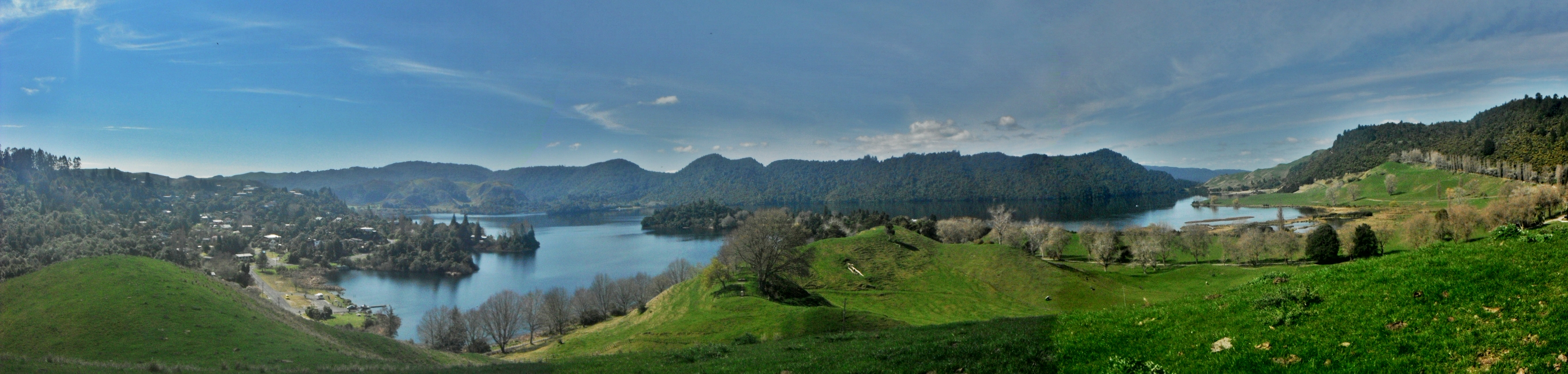
- Lake Ōkāreka

- Location within North Island
- Interactive map of Lake Ōkāreka
- Location: Rotorua Lakes, Bay of Plenty Region, North Island
- Coordinates: 38°10′S 176°22′E
- Type: Crater Lake
- Primary outflows: Waitangi Springs
- Catchment area: 19.6 km^{2} (7.6 sq mi)
- Basin countries: New Zealand
- Max. length: 2.8 km (1.7 mi)
- Max. width: 1.9 km (1.2 mi)
- Surface area: 3.3 km^{2} (1.3 sq mi)
- Average depth: 20.0 m (65.6 ft)
- Max. depth: 34 m (112 ft)
- Surface elevation: 353.6 m (1,160 ft)

Lake Ōkāreka (also spelled Okareka, Ōkareka and just termed Ōkāreka) is one of four small lakes lying between Lake Rotorua and Lake Tarawera, in the Bay of Plenty Region of New Zealand's North Island. The others are Lake Rotokākahi (Green Lake), Lake Tikitapu (Blue Lake), and Lake Ōkataina. All lie within the Ōkataina Caldera, along its western edge.

== Geography ==
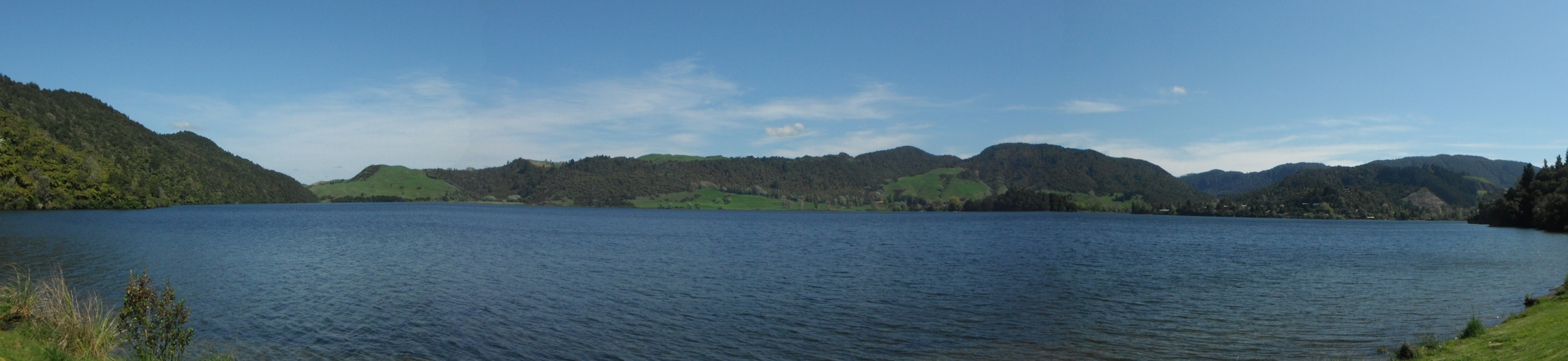
Lake Ōkāreka from DoC campsite

The lake has a circumference of 9.7 km (6.0 mi) and with an autumn mean lake level of 353.6 m (1,160 ft), lies about 60 m (200 ft) above Lake Tarawera. Its outlet flows underground for half a mile and forms the Waitangi waterfall. Lake Ōkāreka seems to be connected with Tarawera by underground channels. About 562 L/s (19.8 cu ft/s) in all, flows from Lake Ōkareka's catchment into Lake Tarawera. The lake's maximum height is now regulated to 353.9 m (1,161 ft) by adjusting a valve in the Waitangi Stream Drain.

=== Geology ===
The lake is closely related to the Ōkareka Embayment on the western margins of the Ōkataina Caldera. Likely formative and modifying eruptions were the Te Rere rhyolite eruption of 25,171 ± 964 years BP and the Rotorua eruption of 15,635 ± 412 cal.yr BP. The effusive rhyolite dome forming process's to the lake's south east after these events would have modified its drainage into Lake Tarawera.

== History ==
This small and little-visited lake is surrounded by hills nearly everywhere, and is a heavy hunting area. It is quite near, but out of sight from the tourist motor route of Rotorua and Tarawera. A side road, Ōkāreka Loop Road, gives access to it. During the late 19th century, settlers acquired some of the land around it, and built houses on Ōkāreka. Some of the frontage is still in private hands, but the greater part of the basin in which the lake lies has now become residential property.

Ōkāreka means "the lake of sweet food". It was first described in print by Sir George Grey, who visited it on the course of his travels through Rotorua to Taupō in 1849–1850. The route from Ohinemutu to Tarawera was a track which skirted the shore of Ōkāreka and reached the large lake, near the mission station called Galilei. Grey's journal reads:

"We reached the beautiful lake of Okareka, just at a place where there is a spring of deliciously cool water, wherewith we all refreshed ourselves and then proceeded to cross the lake in canoes. The lake is really an extremely pretty sight, the shores being lofty and wooded, with the exception of a valley at each end, where the roads run. A peninsula, on which stands the pa called Taumaihi, juts out into the centre of the lake. The waters are beautifully clear, and very deep. There is no apparent outlet to this lake. Its vent consists of an underground stream, which is hidden for about half a mile, and then makes its appearance, looking like a fountain, gushing through a heap of rocks and square stones of a basaltic formation, whence it makes its way in a small stream to Tarawera, the level of which is about sixty feet lower than that of Okareka, and into which the water falls down a declivity of twenty feet, forming a beautiful cascade, surrounded and overshadowed by a clump of karaka and other evergreen trees."

— Sir George Grey

Grey is also presumed to have introduced Dama Wallaby to the area around Ōkāreka, where they presently still pose a problem.

The shores of Ōkāreka were a scene of Māori life. Cultivations along the lake were common, and Māori fished the waters for whitebait, koura crayfish and toitoi, which were common species in Lake Ōkāreka before Brown trout was introduced. In the 1860s, Alfred Domett visited Ōkāreka and Tarawera, following a similar path to the one that Grey took.

Known for its natural environment, this lake has an adjacent settlement of approximately 600 people. The lake is accessible from the tourist location of Rotorua. The forest nearby to Lake Ōkāreka extends to the western side of Lake Ōkataina and the Whakapoungakau Range.

== Pollution ==
Lake Ōkāreka has reasonably clear, clean water and is used extensively for recreation such as boating, swimming and fishing. However, the quality of the water has been declining over recent years due to excess levels of nitrogen and phosphorus. These nutrients come from surrounding farmland, residential septic tanks and from the release of existing and accumulated nutrients from sediments on the lake bed.

The Lake Ōkāreka Catchment Management Plan was developed in 2004. This is a long-term plan to improve the water quality of the lake, through changes like sewage reticulation, in-lake chemical treatment and farm nutrient management. It has been calculated that the load nutrients needed to reach the target TLI of 3.0 are 2.5 tonnes per year of nitrogen and 0.08 tonnes per year of phosphorus.

The trophic level index (TLI) is an overall indication of lake health based on a number of different criteria, values represent a three-yearly average. Better quality sites have a lower TLI. The three-yearly average for Ōkāreka indicates little change over the last five years, being 3.3 in 2014.

== Lake Okareka township ==
The township on the shores of Lake Ōkareka is described by Statistics New Zealand as a rural settlement, and covers 0.82 km^{2} (0.32 sq mi). It had an estimated population of 480 as of June 2025, with a population density of 585 people per km^{2}. Lake Okareka township is part of the larger Kaingaroa-Whakarewarewa statistical area.

Historical population
Year	Pop.	±% p.a.
2006	519	—
2013	534	+0.41%
2018	510	−0.92%
2023	462	−1.96%
The 2006 population is for a larger area of 1.46 km^{2}. Source:

Lake Okāreka had a population of 462 in the 2023 New Zealand census, a decrease of 48 people (−9.4%) since the 2018 census, and a decrease of 72 people (−13.5%) since the 2013 census. There were 231 males, 228 females, and 3 people of other genders in 192 dwellings. 2.6% of people identified as LGBTIQ+. The median age was 49.8 years (compared with 38.1 years nationally). There were 69 people (14.9%) aged under 15 years, 66 (14.3%) aged 15 to 29, 231 (50.0%) aged 30 to 64, and 99 (21.4%) aged 65 or older.

People could identify as more than one ethnicity. The results were 93.5% European (Pākehā), 14.3% Māori, 3.2% Asian, and 3.9% other, which includes people giving their ethnicity as "New Zealander". English was spoken by 98.7%, Māori by 3.2%, and other languages by 9.1%. No language could be spoken by 1.3% (e.g. too young to talk). The percentage of people born overseas was 23.4, compared with 28.8% nationally.

Religious affiliations were 34.4% Christian, 0.6% Māori religious beliefs, 0.6% New Age, 0.6% Jewish, and 1.3% other religions. People who answered that they had no religion were 57.8%, and 5.2% of people did not answer the census question.

Of those at least 15 years old, 189 (48.1%) people had a bachelor's or higher degree, 159 (40.5%) had a post-high school certificate or diploma, and 39 (9.9%) people exclusively held high school qualifications. The median income was $61,000, compared with $41,500 nationally. 96 people (24.4%) earned over $100,000 compared to 12.1% nationally. The employment status of those at least 15 was 219 (55.7%) full-time, 63 (16.0%) part-time, and 3 (0.8%) unemployed.

== See also ==
- Lakes of New Zealand
