= Ōkataina Caldera =

Volcanic caldera in New Zealand

- Ōkataina Volcanic Centre, Okataina Caldera, Okataina Volcanic Centre
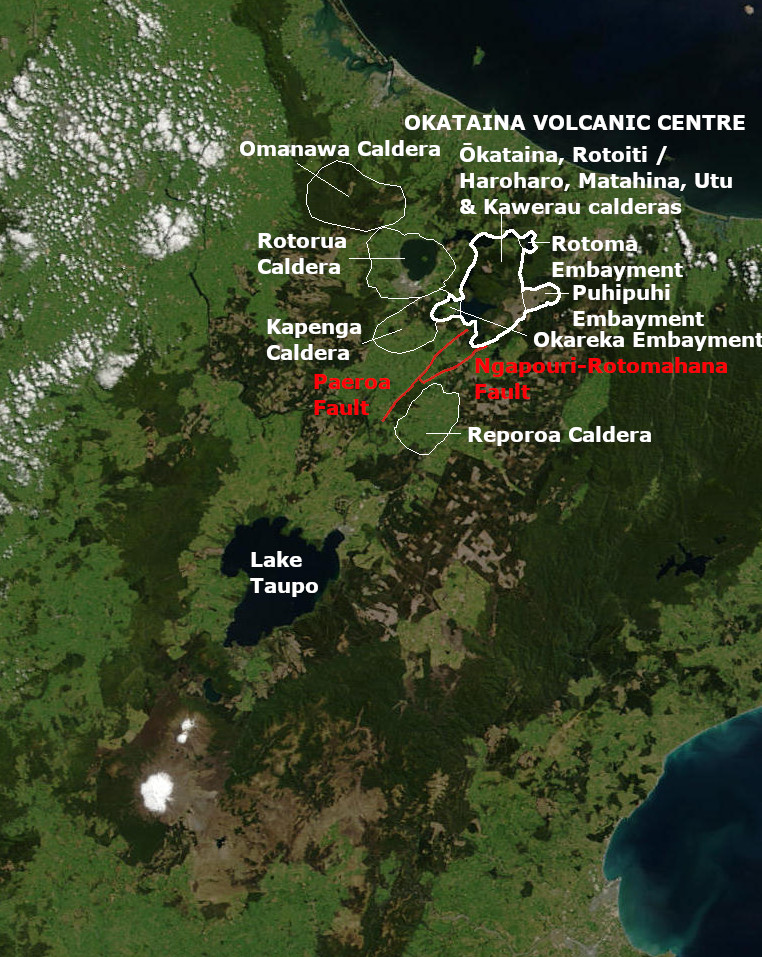
- Okataina Volcanic Centre relationships to other nearby volcanic and tectonic structures

Highest point
- Coordinates: 38°10′S 176°30′E

Dimensions
- Length: 28 km (17 mi)
- Width: 15 km (9.3 mi)

Geography
- Location within New Zealand Location within North Island
- Location: North Island
- Country: New Zealand
- Region: Bay of Plenty

Geology
- Rock age: Pleistocene - Meghalayan (0.625–0.0001 Ma)
- Mountain type: Caldera
- Volcanic zone: Taupō Volcanic Zone
- Last eruption: 1886 Tarawera, 1973 hydrothermal in Waimangu Volcanic Rift Valley

Climbing
- Access: State Highway 5 (New Zealand)

Ōkataina Caldera (Ōkataina Volcanic Centre, also spelled Okataina) is a volcanic caldera and its associated volcanoes located in Taupō Volcanic Zone of New Zealand's North Island. It has several actual or postulated sub calderas. The Ōkataina Caldera is just east of the smaller separate Rotorua Caldera and southwest of the much smaller Rotomā Embayment, which is usually regarded as an associated volcano. It shows high rates of explosive rhyolitic volcanism, although its last eruption was basaltic. The postulated Haroharo Caldera contained within it has sometimes been described in almost interchangeable terms with the Ōkataina Caldera or volcanic complex or centre and by other authors as a separate complex defined by gravitational and magnetic features. (Note: Possibly started from HaroHaro pile ... are rhyolite lavas of the Okataina Volcanic Centre, extruded on the floor of Haroharo Caldera — J. Healy, Geology of the Rotoroa District 1962, p54-55 with the author presuming that certain ignimbrites came from this source. The term Haroharo Caldera was increasingly used in academic papers in the 1970s and 1980s but changed as the detailed geology became better understood. The difficulty was that by then the term Haroharo Caldera was established. The term is still used, and currently is defined by gravity and magnetic differences.) Since 2010 other terms such as the Haroharo vent alignment, Utu Caldera, Matahina Caldera, Rotoiti Caldera and a postulated Kawerau Caldera are often used, rather than a Haroharo Caldera classification.

== Geography ==
The caldera covers an area of about 450 square kilometres (170 mi^{2}), stretching from Lake Rotoehu in the north to Lake Rotomahana in the south. The north east boundary bisects Lake Rotoiti and the north east includes all of Lake Rotomā. The south west corner is defined by the domes of the Ōkareka Embayment and the Waimangu Volcanic Rift Valley while the south east aspect is dominated by Mount Tarawera and the volcanic badlands of the Puhipuhi Basin. The caldera also contains several lakes, including part or all of Lake Ōkareka, Lake Ōkataina, Lake Rotoehu, Lake Rotomā, Lake Rotoiti, Lake Rotomahana, Lake Tarawera and Lake Tikitapu.

== Geology ==
The surface volcanic deposits are mostly rhyolite, with some basalt and one area of dacite. The caldera is now thought to contain the Utu Caldera, the Matahina Caldera, the Rotoiti Caldera, and the Kawerau Caldera, with the Matahina major event about 322,000 years ago and Rotoiti events about 55,000 years ago being characterised as caldera forming. There are three associated geologically collapse structure embayments, being the Rotomā Embayment or Caldera, the Ōkareka Embayment as another now in-filled structure, and the most recently formed (44–31,000 years ago) Puhipuhi Embayment. The oldest parts of the caldera basement are now over 5 km (3.1 mi) deep and the younger Rotoiti and Kawerau calderas are still 2.5 km (1.6 mi) deep and largely infilled by eruptives.

=== Eruptions ===
Map centered to show selected surface volcanic deposits including all the present surface Ōkataina Caldera ignimbrites. The present surface ignimbrites are various light violet shades which are identical for any single source, but other eruptions breakup the ignimbrite sheets. This map shows less detail of recent eruptions of the Ōkataina Caldera than the other map on the page. Legend: Key for the volcanics that are shown with panning is: basalt (shades of brown/orange); monogenetic basalts; undifferentiated basalts of the Tangihua Complex in Northland Allochthon; arc basalts; arc ring basalts; dacite; andesite (shades of red); basaltic andesite; rhyolite (ignimbrite is lighter shades of violet); plutonic; White shading is selected caldera features.; Clicking on the rectangle icon enables full window and mouse-over with volcano name/wikilink and ages before present.

The caldera has seen six eruptions in the past 10,000 years, most recently the 1886 Mount Tarawera eruption in the caldera's southeastern corner. The caldera contains two major lava dome complexes, the Haroharo vent alignment in the north and Tarawera vent alignment in the south. These two vent alignments are associated with current subsidence in the last 20 years of about 1.5 cm/year (0.59 in/year), which is assumed to be because of mainly cooling and contraction of previous magma melt. Other volcanoes connected with the caldera include Putauaki (Mount Edgecumbe) and the maar crater of Lake Rotokawau, which is most likely to have formed from a basaltic dike extrusion associated with the common magma mush body.

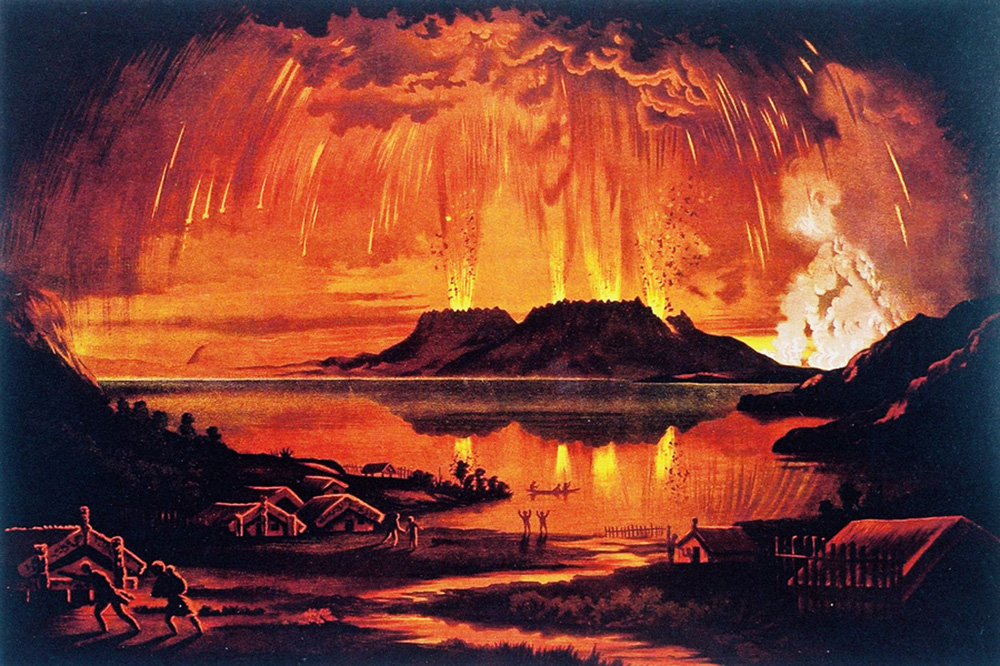
The 1886 eruption of Mount Tarawera, depicted in this contemporary painting by Charles Blomfield, is the most recent major eruption from the Ōkataina Caldera.

=== Threat ===
While the currently most active New Zealand volcanoes produce small eruptions relatively frequently, Ōkataina's volcanoes tend to erupt very violently after intervals of centuries. As such, they pose significant potential threats to the Bay of Plenty Region, and are the most significant volcanic risk in New Zealand. During the last 20,000 years, several types of pyroclastic and lava eruptions have occurred: low-silicate basalt eruptions, high-silicate rhyolite eruptions, and the rarer intermediate andesite and dacite eruptions. The most common magma type at Ōkataina is rhyolite. The warning time before eruptions is suspected to be potentially hours, as volcanic unrest signals are very non-specific, historic composition analysis is consistent with this speed from magma reservoir to surface, and this was all the warning given by the only rhyolitic eruption of the modern era.

=== Eruption mechanism ===
The underlying arc volcanism is driven initially by large inputs of basaltic melt from the subducted Pacific Plate. These basaltic melts often never reach the surface due to a relatively high density of the magma compared to the surrounding Australian Plate crust, but may trigger earthquake swarms. Usually, these intrusions cool in the crust and then either solidify to a gabbroic igneous intrusion (also known as a pluton) at depth or are associated with the generation of more evolved magmas with higher silicate content that separate. They may then as evolved intrusions, cool further without erupting to form a felsic intrusion or can ascend to then erupt as rhyolite, dacite, or andesite. Sometimes such eruptions are believed to be primed by a basaltic melt predecessor. In the case of the Ōkataina Caldera the sub-surface architecture is known to be made up of discrete melt-mush pockets, and with one dacite exception already mentioned, these are rhyolitic. The melt-mush pockets are mainly between 5 and 8 km (3.1 and 5.0 mi) in depth but one has been characterised at 3 km (1.9 mi) depth. The pockets have erupted compositionally distinct magmas in single eruptions. The composition is related to heat and volatiles transferred between the parent basalts and such rhyolites over the time the sub pocket has been maturing. Basaltic-rhyolitic magma interaction definitely happens from local and world wide studies, and will also be a factor in the many different eruption styles that have occurred. Sometimes basalt appears to lead the eruption, at other times it has been postulated that tectonic earthquakes are the final enabler of an eruption.

Any basaltic magmas that do reach the surface will have traversed this complicated crustal region and may erupt as a dyke. This is believed to have happened with the 1886 Mount Tarawera eruption.

Ōkataina surface volcanic deposits in the years after the Rotoiti eruption with darker shading for more recent. Legend: Key for the volcanics that are shown with panning is: basalt; dacite; rhyolite / ignimbrite; █ Definite vents; Ōkataina Volcanic Centre with its embayments; postulated sub calderas of Cole et al. 2009 onwards

=== History ===
It is likely that the volcanic history of the area began some 625,000 years ago. The caldera was formed by at least five huge eruptions between 400,000 and 50,000 years ago.

The oldest eruptive sub caldera is called the Utu caldera and is located in the south central portion. The basement of this sub caldera is about 5 km (3.1 mi) below present ground level.

The most significant collapse event, with an eruptive volume of 150 cubic kilometres (36 cu mi) was 280,000 years ago. This collapse was associated with eruption of the Matahina Ignimbrite which covers over 2,000 km^{2} (770 sq mi) of the central North Island. The second major phase Matahina sub caldera is to the south east and its basement is also about 5 km (3.1 mi) below present ground level. The original shape of the Matahina caldera has been modified (and buried/destroyed) by various events including at least eight smaller eruptions between 70,000 and 24,000 years ago. For example the dacite Puripuri basin/embayment is a subsidence related feature. This subsidence is related to the lateral movement of the underlying magma towards the eastern caldera margins.

The paired eruptions approximately 50,000 years ago of Rotoiti and at Earthquake Flat at far northern and southern ends of the caldera respectively had eruptive volumes of 120 cubic kilometres (29 cu mi) and 10 cubic kilometres (2.4 cu mi). The resulting Rotoiti sub caldera is to the north of the Utu Caldera.

Between this eruption and 21,000 years ago over 81 km^{3} (19 cu mi) of Mangaone silicic plinian tephras or pyroclastic flow deposits occurred but it is unknown where the eruptions were centered. One of these events can be assigned to the Kawerau ignimbrite eruption of 33,000 years ago, with its location within the central part of the Matahina Caldera at level of the Puhipuhi Basin. An area of low gravity on gravimetric studies is consistent with the fourth phase Kawerau Caldera being here and its basement being about 2 km (1.2 mi) below present ground level.

Although the latest caldera models include the Haroharo vent alignment they do not allow for the separate existence of a Haroharo caldera as many had historically postulated existed.

More recently volcanoes within the caldera are known to have erupted eleven times in the last 21,000 years, with all but two of those eruptions being rhyolite. The Rotoma eruptions occurred in a north eastern embayment, and again like with the case of the Puripuri basin, the magma erupted from a lateral reservoir is associated with subsidence back to the eastern Rotoiti caldera margin. The Ōkareka Embayment to the west is also associated with caldera rim subsidence, this time the western shared rims of the Utu, Matahina and Rotoiti calderas.

Two of these eruptions, both at Tarawera, occurred within the last 2000 years (in 1886 and c. 1314AD). The most explosive of the eruptions in the last 21,000 years is likely to have been on the Haroharo vent alignment at about 5500 BCE. This ejected some 17 km^{3} (4.1 cu mi) of magma. During the last 21,000 years the Ōkataina volcano has contributed a total magma eruptive volume of about 80 km^{3} (19 cu mi) in all its eruptions.

In summary characterised eruptions have been:

Characterised eruptions Ōkataina Caldera (bold if caldera forming, dates corrected for multiple source uncertainty)
Years ago	Calendar date	Eruptive name	Vent / Vent alignment / Caldera	VEI	Volume erupted	Notes
45	16 May 1981 CE	Waimangu (Raupo Pond crater)	Tarawera	1		
48	23 February 1978 CE	Waimangu (Raupo Pond, Inferno Crater)	Tarawera	1		
53	22 February 1973 CE	Waimangu (Echo Crater)	Tarawera	1		
75	16 June 1951 CE	Rotomahana	Tarawera	1		
100	17 November 1926 CE	Rotomahana	Tarawera	1		
102	1924 CE	Waimangu (Echo Crater)	Tarawera	1		
108	1918 CE	Waimangu (Echo Crater)	Tarawera	1		
109	24 March 1917 CE	Waimangu (Echo Crater)	Tarawera	1		eruption continued into April
111	5 November 1915 CE	Waimangu (Echo Crater)	Tarawera	1		
111	4 February 1915 CE	Waimangu (Echo Crater & NW of Fairy Crater)	Tarawera	1		
112	28 January 1914 CE	Waimangu (NW of Fairy Crater)	Tarawera	1		
113	27 January 1913 CE	Waimangu (Echo Crater)	Tarawera	1		
114	April 1912 CE	Waimangu (Echo Crater)	Tarawera	1		
116	24 July 1910 CE	Waimangu (Echo Crater)	Tarawera	1		
118	1 October 1908 CE	Waimangu (Echo Crater)	Tarawera	1		
120	21 February 1906 CE	Waimangu (NW of Fairy Crater)	Tarawera	1		
121	17 June 1905 CE	Waimangu (Echo Crater)	Tarawera	1		
121	18 February 1905 CE	Waimangu (Echo Crater)	Tarawera	1		
126	January 1900 CE	Waimangu Geyser	Tarawera	1		
130	1896 CE	Waimangu (Echo Crater)	Tarawera	1		
140	10 June 1886 CE	Tarawera	Tarawera	5	1 km^{3} (0.24 cu mi) DRE	Basaltic eruption Wahanga-Waimangu fissure
636 ± 12 cal.yr	1314 ± 12 CE	Kaharoa tephra	Tarawera	5	5 km^{3} (1.2 cu mi) DRE	This eruption was immediately preceded by a rupture on the Edgecumbe fault.
1846	180 CE		Tarawera	-		Te Kopia thermal area which is on Tawera alignment
3710 ± 10 cal.yr	1760 ± 10 BCE	Rotokawau	Rotokawau	4		Basaltic eruption Rotokawau to Rotoatua
5526 ± 145 cal.yr	3576 ± 145 BCE	Whakatane	Haroharo	5	13 km^{3} (3.1 cu mi) DRE	Makatiti and other domes
7940 ± 257 cal.yr	5990 ± 257 BCE	Mamaku	Haroharo	5	17 km^{3} (4.1 cu mi) DRE	
9423 ± 120 cal.yr	7473 ± 120 BCE	Rotoma	Haroharo	5	8 km^{3} (1.9 cu mi) DRE	
10000 cal.yr	8050 BCE	Rotoma	Haroharo	-		West Rerewhakaaitu fissures
14,009 ± 155 cal.yr	12059 ± 155 BCE	Waiohau tephra	Tarawera	-	10 km^{3} (2.4 cu mi) DRE	
15,635 ± 412 cal.yr	13685 ±412 BCE	Rotorua tephra	Haroharo	-	4 km^{3} (0.96 cu mi) DRE	
17,496 ± 462 cal.yr	15546 ± 462 BCE	Rerewhakaaitu tephra	Tarawera	-	5 km^{3} (1.2 cu mi) DRE	
23,525–370+230 cal.yr	21575 BCE	Okareka	Tarawera	-	8 km^{3} (1.9 cu mi) DRE	(Note: Sources based on Darragh et al. 2006 give timings about 2000 years earlier for the Okareka eruption.)
25,171 ± 964 cal.yr	23221 BCE	Te Rere	Kawerau Caldera (Haroharo)	-	13 km^{3} (3.1 cu mi) DRE	33,000 years ago Kawerau (previously called Kaingaroa and mis-assigned to be 200,000 years older), now corrected to 25,171 years ago
31,500 cal.yr	29550 BCE	Unit L	Unknown	-	8.1 km^{3} (1.9 cu mi) Tephra	
32,500 cal.yr	30550 BCE	Omataroa	Unknown	-	16.2 km^{3} (3.9 cu mi) Tephra	
32,800 cal.yr	30850 BCE	Awakeri	Unknown	-	0.77 km^{3} (0.18 cu mi) Tephra	
33,000 cal.yr	31050 BCE	Mangaone	Unknown	-	19.1 km^{3} (4.6 cu mi) Tephra	
34,500 cal.yr	32550 BCE	Unit H	Unknown	-	0.1 km^{3} (0.024 cu mi) Tephra	
35,000 cal.yr	33050 BCE	Unit G	Unknown	-	2.5 km^{3} (0.60 cu mi) Tephra	
36,100 cal.yr	34150 BCE	Hauparu	Unknown	-	15.2 km^{3} (3.6 cu mi) Tephra	
36,700 cal.yr	34750 BCE	Te Mahoe	Unknown	-	0.9 km^{3} (0.22 cu mi) Tephra	
36,800 cal.yr	34850 BCE	Maketu	Unknown	-	11 km^{3} (2.6 cu mi) Tephra	
38,000 approx. cal.yr	36050 BCE	Unit C (Pupuwharau then Pongakawa)	Unknown	-	0.7 km^{3} (0.17 cu mi) Tephra	
39,000 approx. cal.yr	37050 BCE	Ngamotu	Unknown	-	4.6 km^{3} (1.1 cu mi) Tephra	
40,000 approx. cal.yr	38050 BCE	Unit A	Unknown	-	0.44 km^{3} (0.11 cu mi) Tephra	
49,000 approx. cal.yr	47050 BCE	Earthquake Flat	Earthquake Flat	-		(Note: This eruption is assigned by some to the Kapenga Caldera. See discussion in that article)
about 50,000 cal.yr	48050 BCE	Rotoiti/Rotoehu tephra	Rotoiti Caldera (Haroharo)'	6+	130 km^{3} (31 cu mi) DRE	Basalt was emplaced on the floor of the rhyolitic reservoir. (Note: Ages assigned to the Rotoiti/Rotoehu eruptives currently appear to vary depending upon methodology by about 15,000 years in the literature. This is problematic as many ages of volcanics in the Northern North Island would be more definite if a single agreed value existed. The issue of previous inaccurate age assignment started with a new figure for Rotoehu Ash of 64,000 ± 1650 cal.yr.(Wilson et al 1992) which was initially widely accepted. The youngest age assigned is 44,300 years ago (Shane et al 2003). The problems with some older techniques were possibly not resolved with new techniques that could explain the discrepancy and that resulted in 47,400 ± 1500 years ago (Flude et al 2016), while one recent peer reviewed work gave 61,000 ± 1400 cal.yr (Villamor et al 2022). Other, mainly recent chronology studies have a younger date of 45,200 ± 1650 cal.yr. (Danišík et al 2020 and 2012), 45,100 ± 3300 years ago (Peti et al 2020), 47,400 ± 1500 years ago (Gilgour et al 2008), and before these 65,000 years ago (Spinks 2005). A recent review of 27 determinations gave the consensus range as between about 45 and about 55 cal ka (Hopkins et al. 2021). For more on this age issue see notes to Puhipuhi Embayment.) This was a complex eruptive sequence and sources assign either VEI of 6 or 7. VOGRIPA assigns a magnitude of 7.4.
50,000 + cal.yr	48050 BCE	Matahi Scoria	Suspected to be Rotoiti Caldera	-		Basaltic immediately pre-Rotoiti
about 51,000	49050 BCE	Puhipuhi Dacite	Puhipuhi Embayment	-		48,000+, i.e., is definitely before Rotoiti but age depends on actual Rotoiti age.
96,000 approx. cal.yr	94050 BCE	Moerangi	Moerangi Dome	-		
188,000 approx. cal.yr	186050 BCE	Tutaeheke/Hap-Kapenga	Tutaeheke Dome	-		
240,000 + cal.yr	238050 BCE	Pokopoko pyroclastics	Unknown	-		
240,000 + cal.yr	238050 BCE	Onuku pyroclastics	Unknown	-		
280,000 cal.yr	278000 BCE	Matahina	Matahina Caldera	7	150 km^{3} (36 cu mi) DRE	Recharging basalt found on top ignimbrite layer. The latest age (not literature peer reviewed) is claimed at 322,000 ± 7,000 which appears to be a reversion to the initial uncorrected timing. Also previously timed 230,000. - large as caldera collapse
280,000 + cal.yr	280000 BCE	Matawhaura	Matawhaura Dome	-		
280,000 + cal.yr	280000 BCE	Murupara pyroclastics	Unknown	-		
280,000 + cal.yr	280000 BCE	Wairua	Wairua Dome	-		
280,000 + cal.yr	280000 BCE	Maunawhakamana	Maunawhakamana Dome	-		
280,000 + cal.yr	280000 BCE	Whakapoungakau	Whakapoungakau Dome	-		Lost volume with Matahini eruption
557,000 cal.yr	555000 BCE	Utu	Utu Caldera	-	90 km^{3} (22 cu mi) DRE	VOGRIPA assigns a magnitude of 7.
625,000 cal.yr	623000 BCE	Ōkataina	Ōkataina	-		

=== Tectonics ===
Faults are not defined under this very active caldera. The active Paeroa Fault terminates at the caldera edge and the active Ngapouri-Rotomahana Fault is just to the south. The two recently active main vent alignments in the Ōkataina Caldera, the Horahora and Tarawera vents, are parallel with these identifiable faults outside the caldera, although the faults are not on the exact vent line. In the last 9,500 years, four of the seven major ruptures of the Manawahe Fault have been associated in time with a volcanic eruption of the Okataina volcanic centre. This fault is just to the east of Lake Rotomā at the boundary between the tectonic Whakatāne Graben and the magmatic Ōkataina segments of the Taupō Rift. These are the Whakatane eruption of about 5500 years ago, the Mamaku eruption of about 8000 years ago and at least two fault ruptures in before or during the Rotoma eruption of 9500 years ago. Similarly the Ngapouri-Rotomahana Fault and Paeroa Fault have multiple ruptures associated in time with volcanism including immediately prior to the Mamaku and Rotoma rhyolite eruptions in the case of the Paeroa Fault and of the Ngapouri-Rotomahana Fault immediately prior to the Kaharoa eruption. At least 30% of major Taupō Volcanic Zone eruptions have now been associated with significant local fault ruptures within 30 km (19 mi) of the eruption.
