= Rotoiti Caldera =

Volcanic caldera in New Zealand

- Ōkataina Caldera, Okataina Caldera, Haroharo Caldera
- The gray centred outline is the postulated Rotoiti Caldera. Ōkataina surface volcanic deposits in the years after the Rotoiti eruption with darker shading for more recent. Legend: Key for the volcanics that are shown with panning is: basalt; dacite; rhyolite / ignimbrite; █ Definite vents; Ōkataina Volcanic Centre with its embayments; postulated sub calderas of Cole et al. 2009 onwards

Highest point
- Coordinates: 38°10′S 176°30′E

Dimensions
- Length: 15 km (9.3 mi)
- Width: 15 km (9.3 mi)

Geography
- Location within New Zealand Location within North Island
- Location: North Island
- Country: New Zealand
- Region: Bay of Plenty

Geology
- Rock age: approximately 50,000 years
- Mountain type: Caldera
- Volcanic zone: Taupō Volcanic Zone

The Rotoiti Caldera is a postulated, mainly infilled sub caldera of the Ōkataina Caldera based upon gravitational and magnetic evidence. While bathymetry of Lake Rotoiti is consistent with volcanic vents being present, they could be in an area of collapse subsidence outside the north western margins of the Rotoiti Caldera itself. (Note: Technically significant surface vents can be well separated from a magma chamber and its associated area of caldera collapse immediately above. A recent extreme example with a basalt eruption was in Iceland where the significant vent was over 40 km (25 mi) from the caldera collapse that drove the eruption.)

It erupted 100 cubic kilometres (24 cu mi) of magma that is used in the recent stratigraphy of much of the northern North Island. It was formed in the larger paired eruption with the lesser Earthquake Flat vents linked by tectonic interaction across the length of the Ōkataina Caldera. The series of eruptions was about 50,000 years ago, with the resulting widespread Rotoiti ignimbrite and several layers of Rotoiti/Rotoehu tephra/brecca/ash giving challenges in consistent dating. (Note: Ages assigned to the Rotoiti/Rotoehu eruptives currently appear to vary depending upon methodology by about 15,000 years in the literature. This is problematic as many ages of volcanics in the Northern North Island would be more definite if a single agreed value existed. The issue of previous inaccurate age assignment started with a new figure for Rotoehu Ash of 64,000 ± 1650 cal.yr.(Wilson et al 1992) which was initially widely accepted. The youngest age assigned is 44,300 years ago (Shane et al 2003). The problems with some older techniques were possibly not resolved with new techniques that could explain the discrepancy and that resulted in 47,400 ± 1500 years ago (Flude et al 2016), while one recent peer reviewed work gave 61,000 ± 1400 cal.yr (Villamor et al 2022). Other, mainly recent chronology studies have a younger date of 45,200 ± 1650 cal.yr. (Danišík et al 2020 and 2012), 45,100 ± 3300 years ago (Peti et al 2020), 47,400 ± 1500 years ago (Gilgour et al 2008), and before these 65,000 years ago (Spinks 2005). A recent review of 27 determinations gave the consensus range as between about 45 and about 55 cal ka (Hopkins et al. 2021). For more on this age issue see notes to Puhipuhi Embayment.) It was subsequently infilled by later eruptive activity to a depth of over 2 km (1.2 mi). The paired eruptions may have erupted about 240 cubic kilometres (58 cu mi) of tephra.
