= Lake Rotokawau (Bay of Plenty) =

Lake in the North Island of New Zealand

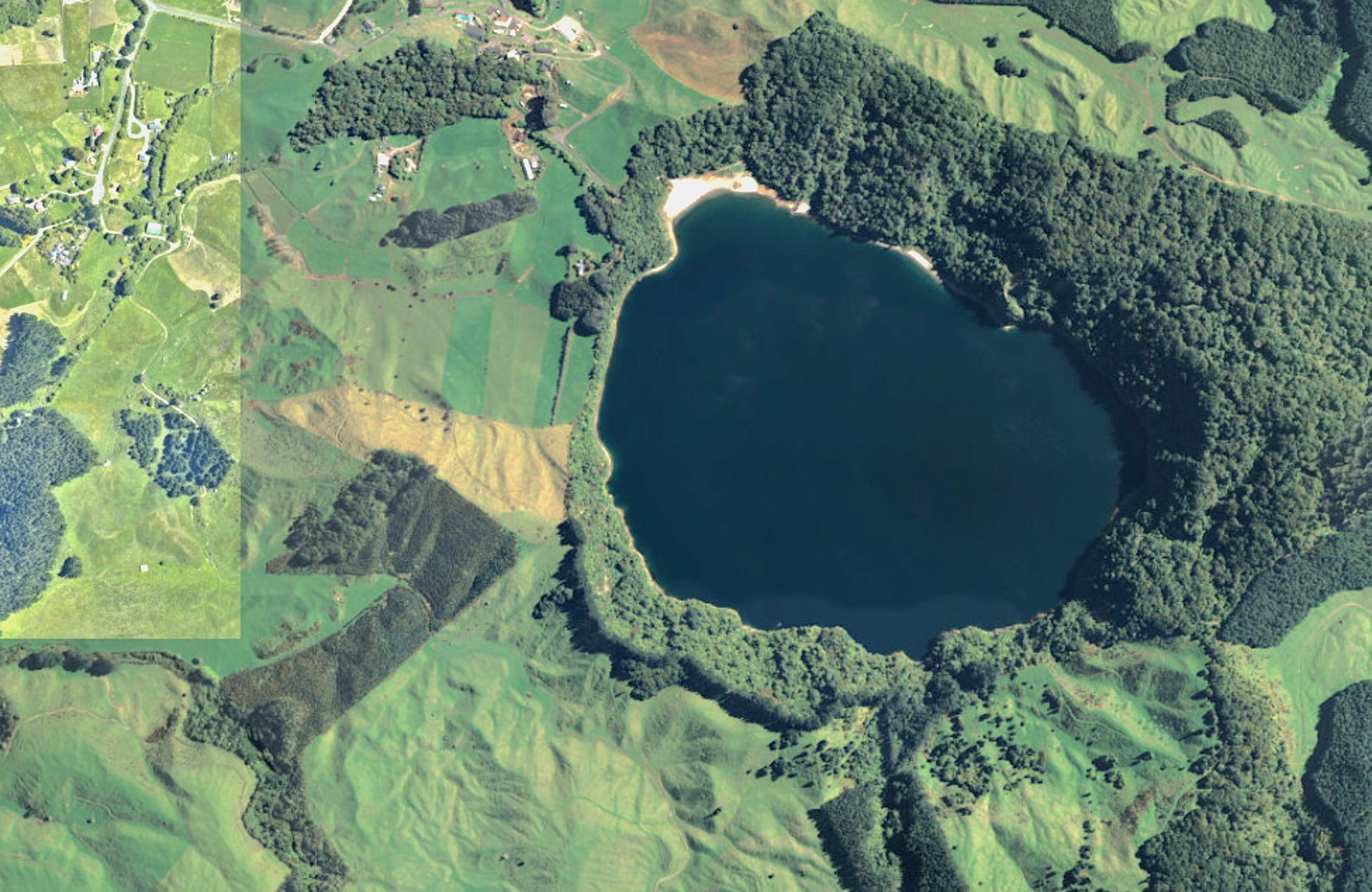
- Aerial view of Lake Rotokawau in 2018

- Location within North Island
- Interactive map of Lake Rotokawau
- Location: Bay of Plenty, North Island
- Coordinates: 38.07331°S 176.37935°E
- Type: maar lake
- Primary inflows: Waimata Stream
- Primary outflows: Waiohewa Stream
- Catchment area: 2.23 km^{2} (0.86 sq mi)
- Basin countries: New Zealand
- Surface area: 0.52 km^{2} (0.20 sq mi)
- Average depth: 43.7 m (143 ft)
- Max. depth: 74 m (243 ft)
- Surface elevation: 320 m (1,050 ft)

Lake Rotokawau is a small volcanic lake 4.1 km (2.5 mi) east of Lake Rotorua in the Bay of Plenty region of New Zealand's North Island. The name is also used for lakes in the Kaipara District (Poutu Peninsula), Chatham Islands, on Aupouri Peninsula and near Lake Waikare in Waikato. Access is via Lake Rotokawau Road, from SH30 at Tikitere (Hell's Gate). The lake is owned and managed by Ngāti Rangiteaorere.

== Ecology ==
Lake Rotokawau is a small, oligotrophic lake; the best example of what many deep Rotorua lakes were once like. Koaro (Galaxias brevipinnis), banded kokopu (Galaxias fasciatus), long-finned eel (Anguilla dieffenbachia), short-finned eel (Anguilla australis), smelt (Retropinna retropinna) and common bully (Gobiomorphus cotidianus) live in the lake. The catchment is roughly 65% forested and 25% in agriculture.

== Geology ==
Lake Rotokawau surface volcanics map with the predominant basaltic eruptives (brown) from a dyke that extended from Ōkataina Caldera through the smaller maar of Lake Rotoatua towards Tikitere. Clicking on the icon on the map enables panning and mouseover of nearby volcanic features and ages before present.
Legend
- Key for the volcanics that are shown with panning is:
- basalt (shades of brown/orange)
- monogenetic basalts
- undifferentiated basalts of the Tangihua Complex in Northland Allochthon
- arc basalts
- arc ring basalts
- dacite
- andesite (shades of red)
- basaltic andesite
- rhyolite (ignimbrite is lighter shades of violet)
- plutonic
- White shading is selected caldera features.
- Clicking on the rectangle icon enables full window and mouse-over with volcano name/wikilink and ages before present.

The lake is a maar lake, formed by an explosion about 4,000 years ago, leaving cliffs of up to 90 m (300 ft) around the lake. The airfall eruptive volume was 0.7 km^{3} (0.17 cu mi) and covered an area with tephra of 70 km^{2} (27 sq mi) with a lava eruptive volume of 0.5 km^{3} (0.12 cu mi). While the local rocks are rhyolite and pumice, with areas of alluvial sand and silt the formative eruption is one of only two, in a locality dominated by rhyolitic eruptions, recent basaltic fissure eruptions (the other is the 1886 eruption of Mount Tarawera). Tephra from the eruption was dated at 3440 ± 70 years before 1950. The eruption had the characteristics of a basaltic dike as there is a line of eruptive vents almost at right angles to the usual vent alignments of the recently active Ōkataina Caldera. The maar crater is located almost exactly where this alignment intercepts a postulated continuation of the known fault defining the southern limit of the Tikitere Graben. The lake has one major inflow, the Waimata Stream, on the south side and also small geothermal springs on the north-west shore. The lake discharges via groundwater to the Waiohewa Stream, near Tikitere.
