= Lake Rotoiti (Bay of Plenty) =

Lake in the North Island of New Zealand

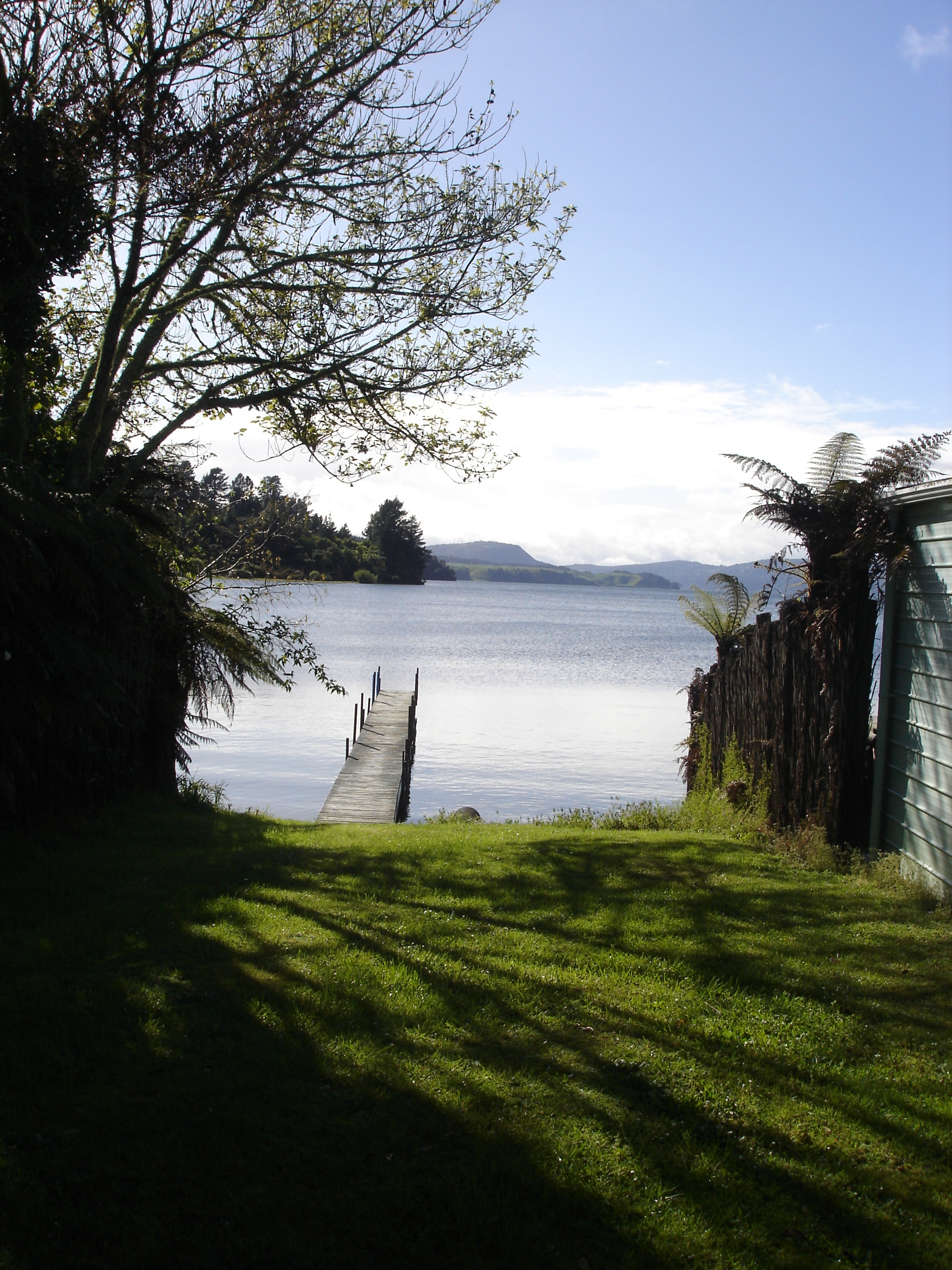
- Lake Rotoiti

- Location within North Island

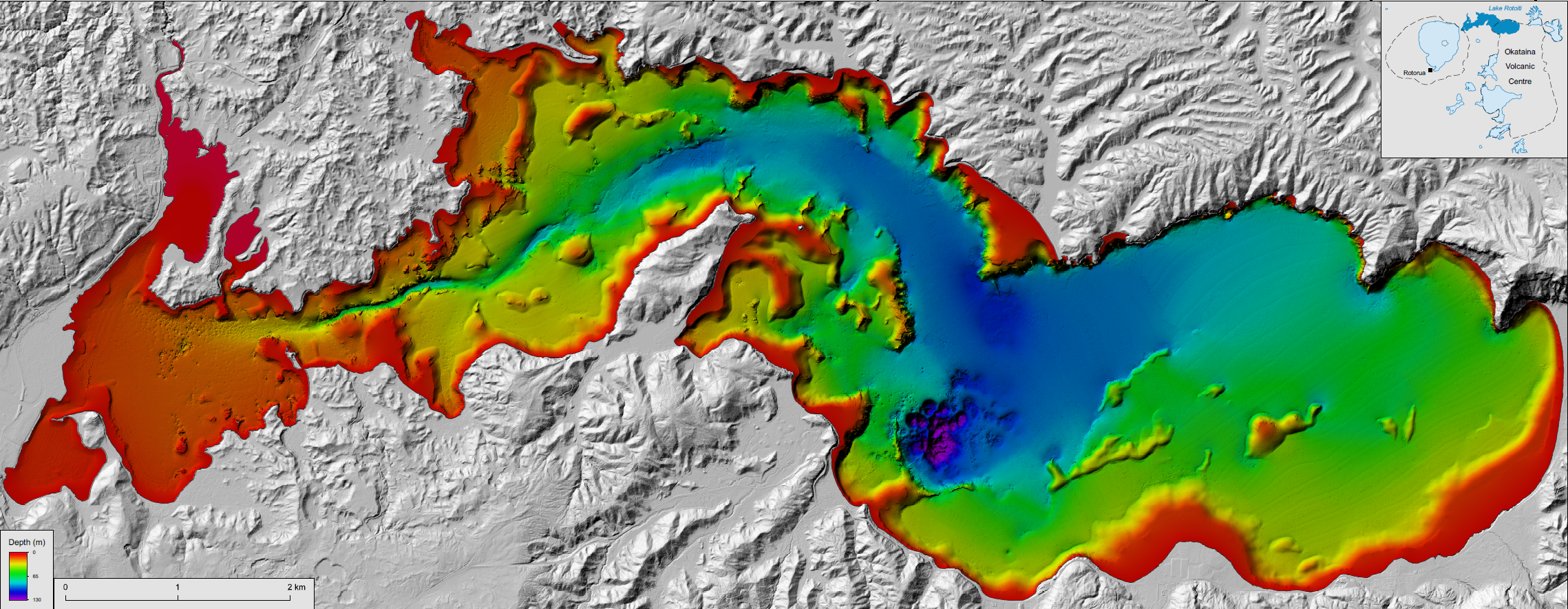
- Bathymetric map of Lake Rotoiti
- Location: Rotorua Lakes, Bay of Plenty Region, North Island
- Coordinates: 38.0390°S 176.4277°E
- Type: crater lake
- Primary outflows: Kaituna River
- Basin countries: New Zealand
- Max. length: 15 km (9.3 mi)
- Max. width: 3.6 km (2.2 mi)
- Surface area: 34.3 km^{2} (13.2 sq mi)
- Average depth: 33 m (108 ft)
- Max. depth: 100.0 m (328.1 ft)
- Surface elevation: 279 m (915 ft)

Lake Rotoiti is a lake in the Bay of Plenty region of New Zealand. It is the northwesternmost in a chain of lakes formed within the Ōkataina Caldera. The lake is close to the northern shore of its more famous neighbour, Lake Rotorua, and is connected to it via the Ohau Channel. It drains to the Kaituna River, which flows into the Bay of Plenty near Maketu.

The full name of the lake is Te Rotoiti-kite-a-Īhenga, which in the Māori language means "The Small Lake Discovered by Īhenga", the Māori explorer also credited with discovering Lake Rotorua. Legend says that the lake was named as such because when Ihenga first saw it, he could only see a small part of it and thought the lake was a lot smaller.

Since the 1960s, the quality of lake water has been negatively affected by inflows of nitrogen rich water from Lake Rotorua, agricultural run-off from surrounding farms and seepage from domestic septic tanks. The effects of this included an almost permanent algal bloom in the Okere arm of the lake and choking lake weed growth in other still areas of the lake. A barrier to divert the nutrient rich waters of Lake Rotorua into the Kaituna River was completed in late 2008.

The Bay of Plenty Regional Council is expected to see improvement in lake water quality within five years. The Rotorua Te Arawa Lakes Program reported in 2013 that the intervention has significantly improved water quality. Water quality is the highest it has been in decades, and it is on track to meet targets set by the Program to meet community expectations.

Lake Rotoiti has thermal hot-spring baths on the southern shore which are accessible by boat.

== Geology ==
Its joint drainage with Lake Rotorua through the Ohau Channel depends upon the sinking Tikitere graben which is also very geothermally active on the south eastern margins of the lake. There appear to have been Rotoiti eruptive vents at the eastern end of the lake and although these are part of the Ōkataina Volcanic Centre they are believed to be in an area of collapse subsidence outside the north western margins of the Ōkataina Caldera itself. (Note: Technically significant surface vents can be well separated from a magma chamber and its associated area of caldera collapse immediately above. A recent extreme example with a basalt eruption was in Iceland where the significant vent was over 40 km (25 mi) from the caldera collapse that drove the eruption.)

This region of the caldera was at one time termed the Haroharo Caldera, but has been renamed in the more standard major event fashion to the Rotoiti Caldera. As postulated, this caldera does not house the lake. The age of this large eruption of more than 100 cubic kilometres (24 cu mi) of magma was historically ill-defined due to several complexities and the literature gives a range from 40,000 years to 64,000 years ago with 47,400 ± 1500 years ago being recently quoted. What is not now challenged is that this was a paired eruption with a nearby vent in the Ōkataina Caldera that had a separate magma source and erupted Earthquake Flat breccia.

== Climate ==
Climate data for Lake Rotoiti (1991–2020)
Month	Jan	Feb	Mar	Apr	May	Jun	Jul	Aug	Sep	Oct	Nov	Dec	Year
Mean daily maximum °C (°F)	21.2 (70.2)	21.2 (70.2)	18.9 (66.0)	15.4 (59.7)	12.1 (53.8)	9.1 (48.4)	8.9 (48.0)	10.0 (50.0)	12.1 (53.8)	14.5 (58.1)	16.5 (61.7)	18.9 (66.0)	14.9 (58.8)
Daily mean °C (°F)	14.9 (58.8)	14.8 (58.6)	12.9 (55.2)	9.9 (49.8)	7.1 (44.8)	4.1 (39.4)	3.7 (38.7)	4.8 (40.6)	6.8 (44.2)	9.0 (48.2)	10.8 (51.4)	13.2 (55.8)	9.3 (48.8)
Mean daily minimum °C (°F)	8.7 (47.7)	8.5 (47.3)	6.9 (44.4)	4.4 (39.9)	2.1 (35.8)	−0.9 (30.4)	−1.5 (29.3)	−0.4 (31.3)	1.6 (34.9)	3.6 (38.5)	5.1 (41.2)	7.5 (45.5)	3.8 (38.9)
Average rainfall mm (inches)	131.0 (5.16)	108.9 (4.29)	121.0 (4.76)	90.1 (3.55)	116.5 (4.59)	159.2 (6.27)	104.0 (4.09)	139.0 (5.47)	154.3 (6.07)	167.8 (6.61)	149.6 (5.89)	150.7 (5.93)	1,592.1 (62.68)
Source: NIWA

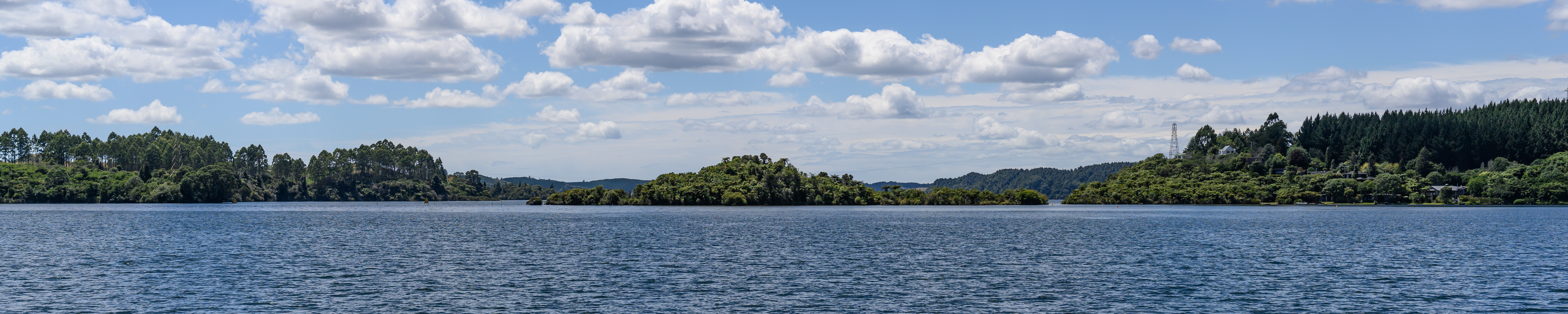
Panorama of Lake Rotoiti
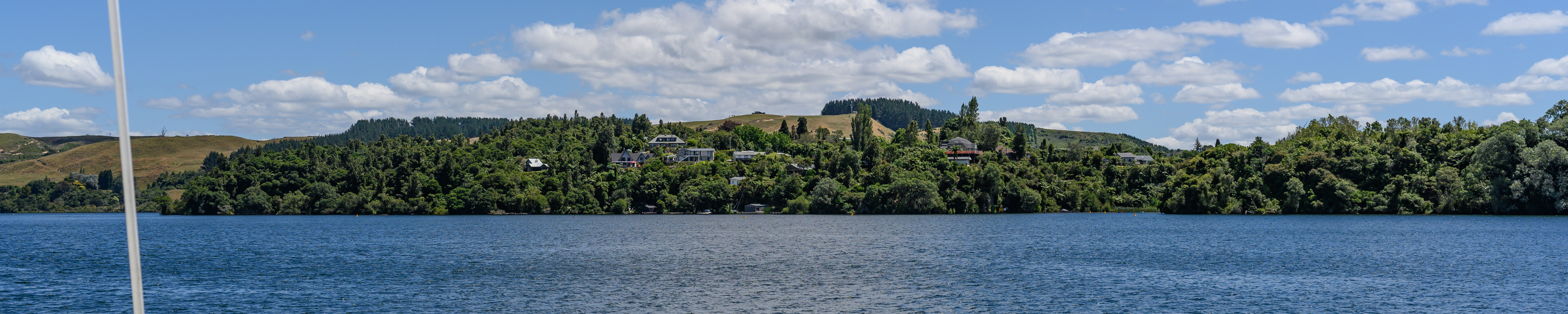
Homes and vacation homes nestled in around Lake Rotoiti
