= Hikurangi Margin =

Subduction zone off the east coast of New Zealand's North Island

- Hikurangi Subduction Zone
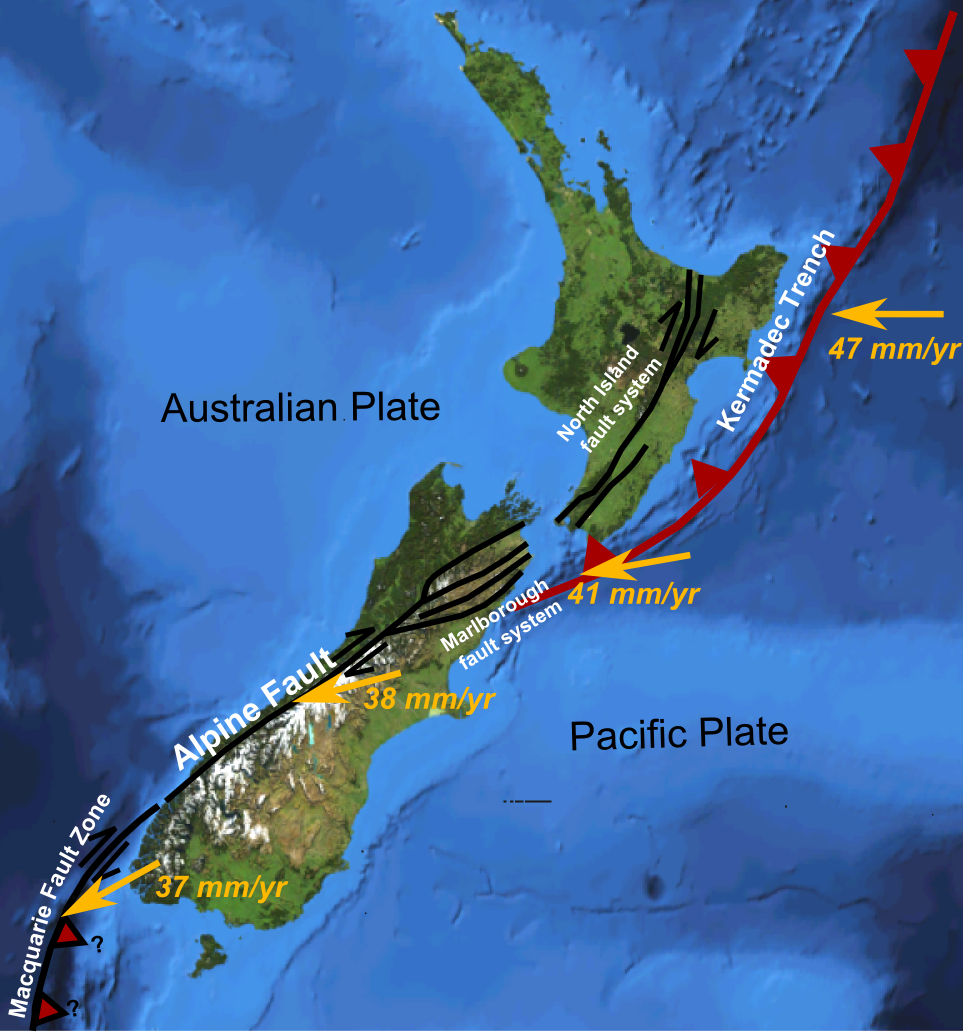
- The Hikurangi Margin is an active fault off the east coast of the North Island of New Zealand. This shows variation in displacement vector of Pacific Plate relative to the Kermadec Plate and Australian Plate along the boundary. The Kermadec Trench label would better read Hikurangi Trough at this position. The Kermadec Plate is not labelled but lies between the labels of the North Island Fault System and the Kermadec Trench in the picture.

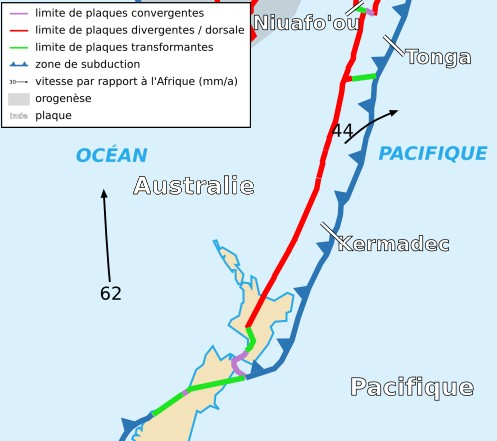
- The relationship of the Kermadec Plate to its New Zealand portion whose eastern margin is the Hikurangi Subduction Zone and the Tonga Plate.
- Etymology: Hikurangi
- Country: New Zealand
- Region: North Island

Characteristics
- Length: 300 km (190 mi)
- Displacement: 6 cm (2.4 in)/yr

Tectonics
- Plate: Indo-Australian
- Status: Active
- Earthquakes: M_{w} 8.2
- Type: Subduction
- Age: Miocene-Holocene
- New Zealand geology database (includes faults)

The Hikurangi Margin (also known as the Hikurangi Subduction Zone) is New Zealand's largest subduction zone and fault.

== Tectonics ==
The Hikurangi Subduction Zone is an active subduction zone extending off the east coast of New Zealand's North Island, where the Pacific and Australian plates collide. The subduction zone where the Pacific Plate goes under the Kermadec Plate offshore of Gisborne accommodates approximately 6 cm/year (2.4 in/year) of plate movement while off the Wairarapa shore this decreases to perhaps as low as 2 cm/year (0.79 in/year). It is the southern portion of the Tonga–Kermadec–Hikurangi subduction zone and its main feature is the Hikurangi Trough. The tectonics of this area can be most easily resolved by postulating between the Havre Trough to the east of the South Kermadec Ridge Seamounts, the Whakatane Graben and the Taupō Volcanic Zone on the North Island of New Zealand there is a continuation of the Tonga micro-plate into the Kermadec microplate which probably extends to Cook Strait. The on land active fault systems would be consistent with the Kermadec Plate's unclear south western boundary being the North Island Fault System. The Kermadec Plate - Pacific Plate eastern boundary is the Hikurangi-Kermadec trench.

The Hikurangi Plateau, a remnant of a large igneous province is being subducted under the North Island at the margin currently. The subducting slab's Wadati–Benioff zone is over 200 km (120 mi) deep at Tauranga and Mount Taranaki and more than 75 km (47 mi) deep under the Taupō Volcanic Zone.

== Earthquakes ==
The map of zones of all above M_{w} 4.5 earthquakes near New Zealand. Earthquakes associated with Hikurangi Margin subduction have depth zones while earthquakes associated with rifting and transverse faulting are shallow at less than 70 km (43 mi). Key: Shallow back arc earthquakes less than 70 km (43 mi) deep Up to 70 km (43 mi) deep subduction shallow-focus earthquakes 70–300 km (43–186 mi) deep shallow-focus earthquakes More than 300 km (190 mi) deep shallow-focus earthquakes (blue) Active subduction trenches back arc basins (brown) back arc ridges (yellow) Spreading centers or rifts (green) Other ocean floor features Active faults would be red lines and inactive black but are not shown usually as they tend to be smaller scale features that would add to map complexity. Mouse over shows feature names.

Earthquakes of up to M_{w} 8.2 have been recorded on the Hikurangi Margin, generating local tsunamis, and earthquakes in the 9.0M range are thought to be possible. The Ruatoria debris avalanche originated on the north part of the subduction zone and probably occurred sometime after 170,000 years ago and before 42,000 years ago. Multiple uplift earthquakes will have occurred in the locked areas of the fault but a good historical record does not yet exist. The Pacific Plate slab has earthquakes often associated with it under New Zealand and for example deep earthquakes at more than 300 km (190 mi) under Taranaki or more than 70 km (43 mi) under the North Island Volcanic Plateau are likely associated with the subducted slab as it goes deeper under the crust.

=== Slow slip events ===
There are well characterised now slow slip events across the Hikurangi Margin Hikurangi Margin slow slip events occur up to yearly at a shallow depth of less than 10 km (6.2 mi), and last for up to 6 weeks relieving stress on much of the fault. For example, the series of slow slip events between 2013 and 2016 involved moment release of approximately M_{w} 7.4. At least one of the well characterised events was very close to the trench. On land parallel to the predicted fault line of the Hikurangi Margin are active faults which are not fully characterised and include the Parkhill Fault Zone near Cape Kidnappers, the Maraetotara Fault Zone, and the Flat Point Fault. The slow slip activity has been associated with on land a mud volcano eruption causing a significant landslip.

=== Modelling events ===
Because it has been possible to examine the mechanical properties of the subducted ocean floor clays recovered by drilling into the subducted rock, it has been possible to develop a model that may explain both the slow slip events but also why large and relatively deep earthquake ruptures are propagated into the shallow areas of the subduction zone thus displacing the ocean floor and generating tsunamis. The model suggests that shallow-depth subducted water-saturated clay-rich sediments, promote earthquake rupture propagation and slip.

=== List ===
The Hikurangi Margin has the potential to produce notable earthquakes. Some significant earthquakes are:

- The magnitude M_{w} 7.1 2016 Te Araroa earthquake
- The 21 August 2001 M_{w} 7.1 NE of New Zealand's East Cape
- The 6 February 1995 M_{w} 7.5 earthquake offshore East Cape
- The twin magnitude M_{w} 7.1 1947 Gisborne earthquakes and tsunami had maximum tsunami run off of at least 10 m (33 ft)
- The magnitude M_{w} 7.0-7.2 1934 Pahiatua earthquake
- The 1931 Hawke's Bay earthquake and its aftershocks remains New Zealand's deadliest natural disaster. It had a magnitude of M_{w} 7.4. The earthquake is thought to have occurred on one of the larger thrust faults of the Hikurangi Margin, at between from 5 km depth to 25 km depth.
- The magnitude M_{w} 7.0-7.2 1904 Cape Turnagain earthquake.
- The magnitude M_{w} 7.5 1863 Hawke's Bay earthquake

There have been ten possible large subduction earthquakes identified over the past 7000 years before the above historic records along the Hikurangi margin. The last such pre history earthquake occurred 571 ± 25 years ago in the southern Hikurangi margin. An earthquake associated with a tsunami and at least 354 km (220 mi) of the margin rupturing, occurred between 946 and 891 years ago.
