= Manawahe Fault =

Active fault in New Zealand

- Approximate surface traces of the active Manawahe Fault in red in the Taupō Rift, North Island, New Zealand
- Etymology: Manawahe
- Coordinates: 37.964°S 176.671°E
- Country: New Zealand
- Region: Bay of Plenty Region

Characteristics
- Range: M_{w} 6.3
- Length: 14 km (8.7 mi)
- Strike: ENE
- Displacement: 3 mm (0.12 in)/yr

Tectonics
- Plate: Indo-Australian
- Status: Active, recurrence is 1580–2000 years
- Type: Normal fault
- Age: Holocene ~0.1 Ma
- Volcanic arc/belt: Taupō Volcanic Zone
- New Zealand geology database (includes faults)

The Manawahe Fault line is a seismically active area in the Bay of Plenty Region of the central North Island of New Zealand with the potential to be involved with other faults in an M_{w} 7.0 event.

== Geology ==
North of Lake Rotomā, volcanic ignimbrite sheets from multiple eruptions of the Ōkataina Caldera extend towards the Whakatane Graben, with the volcanic region being separated from the tectonic Whakatane portion of the Taupō Rift by the Manawahe Fault. The fault continues to the east and coast in the Matata Fault line. The Manawahe Fault consists of a series of closely-spaced, mainly SSE-dipping fault traces, which are parallel to the North Rotoma Fault at the edge of the north eastern edge of the Rotoma Caldera. The traces are presumed to merge within 3 km (1.9 mi) of the surface. The Manawahe Fault ruptured immediately prior to the 5500 years ago Whakatane eruption of the Ōkataina Caldera and also ruptured several times, associated with the Rotoma Caldera eruptive sequence, and immediately after the Mamaku eruption.

== Risks ==
This intra-rift fault has certainly ruptured several times in the last 10,000 years. The most recent rupture occurred 636 years ago, on a fault within the Taupō Volcanic Zone that has one of the highest known slip rates, with recurrence intervals ranging from 1,580 to 2,000 years. Although potentially ruptures could be up to M_{w} 7 if the fault ruptured at the same time as the longer Matata fault, only > M_{w} 5.5 can be definitely assigned on displacements characterised to date as there appears to have never been a single full length fault rupture which would result in a M_{w} 6.3event.
