= Matata Fault =

Active fault in New Zealand

Manata Fault
- Matatā Fault
- Approximate surface traces of the active Matata Fault in red in the Taupō Rift, North Island, New Zealand
- Etymology: Matatā
- Coordinates: 38.0°S 176.671°E
- Country: New Zealand
- Region: Bay of Plenty Region

Characteristics
- Displacement: 1 mm (0.039 in)/year

Tectonics
- Plate: Indo-Australian
- Status: Active with M_{w} 7.0 potential, recurrence is <=2,000 years
- Type: Normal fault
- Age: Holocene ~1–0 Ma
- Volcanic arc/belt: Taupō Volcanic Zone
- New Zealand geology database (includes faults)

The Matata Fault zone is a seismically active area in the Bay of Plenty Region of the central North Island of New Zealand with potential to rupture as part of a M_{w} 7.0 event.

== Geology ==
The Matata Fault zone is the northwestern wall fault of the Whakatāne Graben and extends from the coast near Matatā to where the boundary of the modern Taupō Rift changes direction to a mainly SSE-dipping fault trace of the Manawahe Fault. At this southern end of the fault there is an area of Manawahe dacite that has been dated to 425,000 ± 27,000 years ago. There has been considerable uplift of Castlecliffian (mid Quaternary) marine sediments at a rate of 1 mm (0.039 in)/year to more than 300 m (980 ft) above sea level. An earthquake swam that commenced in 2005 at the northern end of the Matata Fault zone progressed off shore and lasted until 2009. At the coast there was an area of transition of a few miles with lower current seismic activity to defined off shore faults. These earthquakes were also associated with about 400 km^{2} (150 sq mi) of area that has risen by up to 40 cm (16 in) since the 1950s. The increase of height over this area is not thought to be consistent with a pure tectonic origin but would be consistent with inflation from the accumulation of magma at a depth of about 9.5 km (5.9 mi). This magma body was later interpreted as a newly stalled sill under the northern Matata Fault.

== Risks ==
During the period 2005 to 2009 an earthquake swarm occurred near Matatā with many low magnitude earthquakes and one of M_{w} 4.7 . A potentially whole fault rupture could be up to M_{w} 7.0 if the fault ruptured at the same time as the shorter Manawahe Fault which is a continuation. Volcanic eruption risk is not negligible given the past eruption of Manawahe Massif dacite/andesite and the coupling of the Manawahe Fault with other eruptions.
