= Hikurangi Trough =

Oceanic trench off the east coast of New Zealand

'"`UNIQ--templatestyles-00000002-QINU`"'
(blue) Surface projection of Hikurangi Margin, trough and trench structures.
'"`UNIQ--templatestyles-00000003-QINU`"'
(green) Hikurangi Channel
Mouse over is enabled by clicking and allows identification of features.

Map of the Zealandia continent that shows the Hikurangi Margin as a red dotted line arising from the Chatham Rise, New Zealand intersection

The Hikurangi Trough (previously known as the Hikurangi Trench) (Note: The term trough is used predominantly in the article as this reflects the now accepted international name and that the trench is mainly filled with sediment) is a sea floor feature of the Pacific Ocean off the north-east South Island and the east coast of the North Island of New Zealand. It has been forming for about 25 million years and is turbidite-filled, particularly in its south. This characteristic can be used to distinguish it from the sediment-poor and deeper Kermadec Trench, which is its continuation to the north. Sediment currently passing through the trough represents about 0.5% of the total sediment input to the world oceans. The trough has deep-sea chemosynthetic ecosystems that are unique.

== Geography ==
Although shallower than the trenches north of it, the Hikurangi Trough reaches depths of 3,000 metres (9,800 feet) as close as 80 kilometres (50 miles) from shore. The southern trough structure is 6–10 km (3.7–6.2 mi) wide off the coast of northern Canterbury with an initial local depth of about 2,000 m (6,600 ft), and towards its northern portions it has structures more like those found in oceanic trenches. The trough widens about the latitude of Cook Strait to between 50–80 km (31–50 mi) up to the Māhia Peninsula. There are various mappings of its northern limits as the Ruatōria debris avalanche was a poorly understood structure. The limits of the trough are not defined by standard geographical works and various geological works have different mappings. (Note: The northern limits of the trough are ill-defined. Seismic geological studies are consistent with the trough being buried under the Ruatōria debris avalanche, and there is an unnamed feature on the northern side of the Ruatōria debris avalanche south of the Ruatōria Scarp. Part of the Ruatōria Scarp could be associated with the subduction margin before it intercepts the geographical southernmost point of the Kermadec Trench as presently defined at 37° 45′ 16.27″ S by GEBCO. The Marine Gazetteer defines the southern limit of the Kermadec Trench much further north as 35°30' S. and there is different mapping in the historic geological literature.)

A meandering depression within the trough like structure, the Hikurangi Channel (also known as Hikurangi Sea Channel or Hikurangi Seachannel), commences in the south and trends to the eastern side of the trough. By the latitude of Cook Strait the channel is about 80 m (260 ft) below the general level of the trough. The seafloor Hikurangi Channel continues along its eastern side, until at the Māhia Peninsula it breaks off towards the east through the Hikurangi Plateau and discharges into the south-west Pacific abyssal plains. The channel has a total length between 1,400–2,000 km (870–1,240 mi), but only the initial 800 km (500 mi) portion is in the trough.

The trough to the south has related structures such as the undersea Pūkākī, Okains and Pegasus canyons at the latitude of Pegasus Bay, the Hurunui Canyon which is beyond the Hurunui River mouth, and the sudden coastal shelving to 823 m (2,700 ft) just south-east of Kaikōura of the Kaikōura Canyon, where the sea floor drops to the depth of the trough. Extending from the hilly coast north of Kaikōura the undersea Kowhai canyons are to the west of the trough. Towards the north eastern part of Cook Strait is the Cook Strait Canyon with part of the trough being 2,250 m (7,380 ft) deep. Off Cape Palliser, a part of the trough is 2,236 m (7,336 ft) deep, less than the Hikurangi Plateau's 2,588 m (8,491 ft) on the eastern side of the trough at this latitude. The Hikurangi Plateau extends east of the trough between the Chatham Rise to the south and a point north of New Zealand's East Cape. On the east coast of the North Island between the Pāhaoa and Māhia canyons there is not direct drainage from the coast into the trough as the seafloor has a number of intermediate ridges and basins. In terms of being a definite trench with two sides, this is found on the sea floor north of the Māhia Peninsula but is broken by the Tuaheni submarine landslide at about 38°50'S, and the submarine Ruatōria debris avalanche at about 38°S. Beyond the Ruatōria debris avalanche the Hikurangi Margin joins the Ruatōria Scarp and then drops away from the undersea East Cape Ridge and commences trench–like structures to depths of 4,580 m (15,030 ft) assigned by many authorities to the Kermadec Trench which further north has a distinct transition to a much greater 7,436 m (24,396 ft) depth.

== Geology ==
The Hikurangi Trough is sediment filled as a result of being a key part of the eastern New Zealand oceanic sedimentary system for several million years. The present North Island subduction and accretion that began in the middle and late Oligocene, caused thick sedimentary sequences to form in the then trench with enhanced abyssal erosion in the late Miocene. More recently it has sediment from the erosion of the uplifting mountains of the South Island of New Zealand such as the Southern Alps, which formed from 6.4 million years ago. This system currently contributes about 0.5% of the total sediment input to the world oceans. The sediments in the trench are up to 5 km (3.1 mi) deep in the south and where they exit the Kaikōura Canyon have acoustic characteristics of gravel turbidites. The turbidites thin to about 1 km (0.62 mi) in the north. Gas hydrates have been identified in the sediments and there are widespread methane seeps. Radiodating analysis of the carbonate rocks formed at such seeps show that the carbonate formation has been going on for periods between 2,360±70 years BP to 12,400±160 years BP.

The active turbidite channel represented by the Hikurangi Channel, guides turbidity currents into the path of the Pacific deep western boundary current to the north. The Hikurangi Channel is known to be less than 3.5 million years old. Initially the channel developed during the late Pliocene and extended along the Hikurangi Trench northwards. The sediments are predominantly delivered by submarine canyons and slope gullies that cut across or circumvent obstructions to flow, and the Kaikōura Canyon is known to be the dominant current active and longterm contributor in the case of the Hikurangi Trench. Exceptionally, the 2016 Kaikōura earthquake precipitated submarine mudslides and sediment flows that displaced about 850×10^{6} t (8.4×10^{8} long tons; 9.4×10^{8} short tons) of sediment into the trench from the Kaikōura Canyon, with a turbidity current that travelled more than 680 km (420 mi) along the Hikurangi Channel. The furtherest marine core sampled in the channel so far revealed more than 16 cm (6.3 in) of fresh sediment. The full analysis is nuanced, with flows from ten turbide triggering catchments but also flows that may be due to submarine land sliding from shaking associated with ground-motion amplitude peaks that produce failure in muddy sediments. The catchment of the Cook Strait Canyon was a large contributor to the turbidite deposits from the earthquake. (Note: No core sample was obtained at the outlet of the Kaikōura Canyon so the relative contributions of it and the Cook Strait Canyon at the time of the 2016 Kaikōura earthquake are ill defined.)

=== Tectonics ===
The Hikurangi Margin subduction zone is where the thick oceanic Hikurangi Plateau has been subducting for about 25 million years beneath continental crust of the old Indo-Australian plate possibly without an intermediate continental crust microplate, although there are rotation features. The relative motion at the north is 6.1 cm/year (2.4 in/year) at East Cape and is down to 3.5 cm/year (1.4 in/year) at Cape Turnagain with regard to convergence. The net vector is 4.5 cm/year (1.8 in/year) to with a vector direction of 266° and 3.8 cm/year (1.5 in/year) in a direction of 259° at the Canterbury end. This is split into convergence near the trench, strike-slip motion around the top of the forearc ridge, and extension in the Taupō Rift. There is not a continuous trench with two sides at the margin and some complexity in the trench or trough like structures is due to the complex transitional tectonics and old subducting seamounts. By contrast, the Kermadec and Tonga trenches represent the parts of the Kermadec-Tonga subduction zone where the oceanic crust of the Pacific plate is subducting beneath oceanic crust of the Kermadec and Tonga microplates which also abut oceanic crust of the current Australian plate.

== Ecology ==
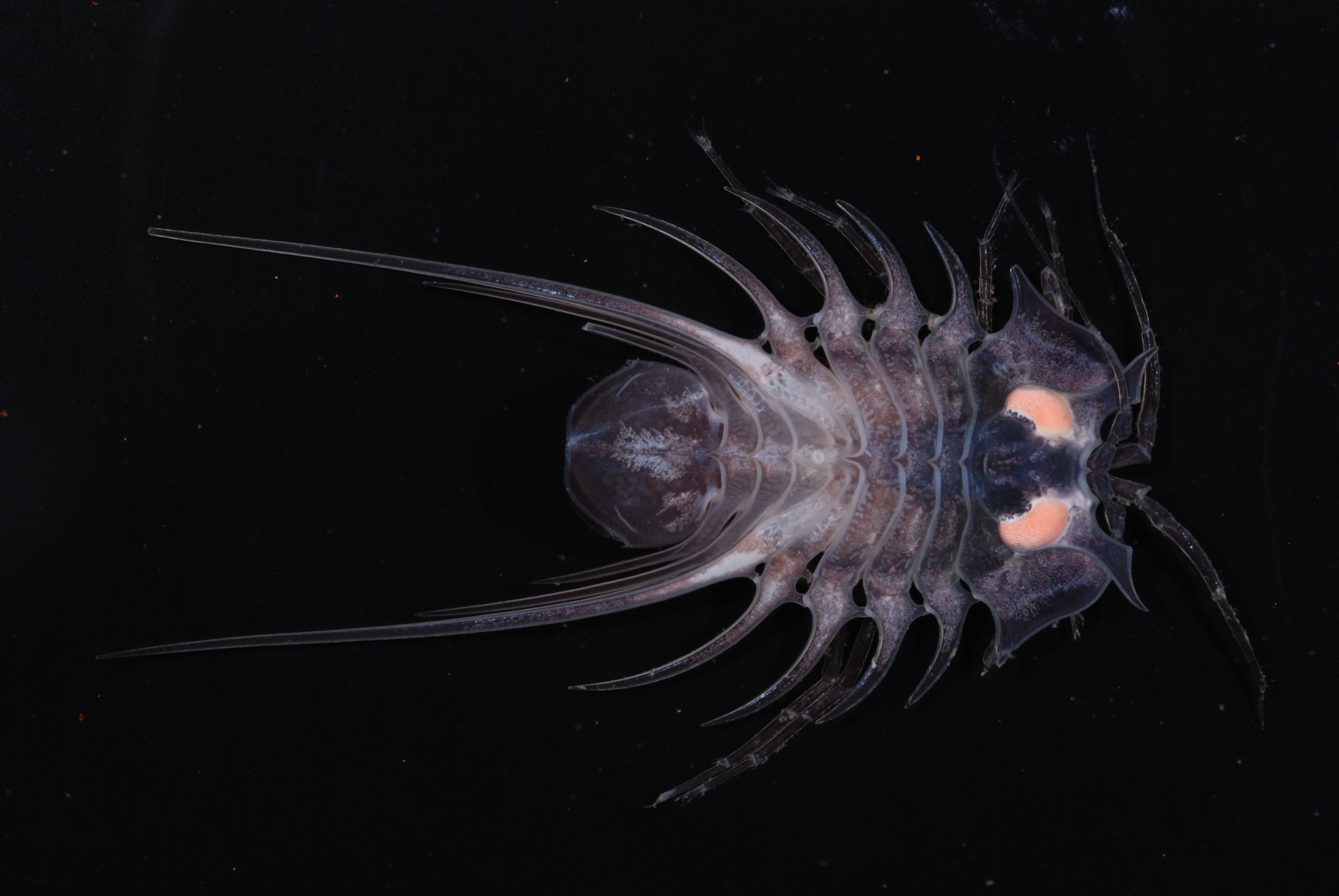
Brucerolis brandtae an isopod found in the Hikurangi Margin sea waters

Because of the delivery of waters by the Lower Circumpolar Deep Waters and current and coastal drainage and surface currents such as the East Cape Current a rich marine ecosystem exists in the coastal waters over the trench. The trench ecosystem itself has been much less studied as it is even deeper than the economically important deep marine fisheries. The middle and southern Hikurangi Margin includes fisheries for hoki, alfonsino and orange roughy. The far south area of the trough near the Kaikōura Canyon, the Subtropical Front forms a convergence zone between the subtropical and subantarctic water masses represented by the Southland Current down to about 1,000 m (3,300 ft). This region of ocean has been determined to be one of the most productive marine ecosystems on the planet. At this end of the trench, many deep water species are found close to the shore. This food source attracts the whales for which the town of Kaikōura is famous. The 2016 Kaikōura earthquake profoundly disturbed this ecosystem, but there is evidence of recovery.

In one study, biological sampling of the walls of the trough took place at six sites between 690 and 1,561 m (2,264 and 5,121 ft) deep. Compared to similar sampling in the more northern Bay of Plenty there were higher abundances in the Hikurangi Margin of many crustaceans and worms such as mud dragons, ostracods, nematode worms, copepods, tanaidacea, segmented worms, isopods and amphipods.

=== Methane seeps ===
In the trough itself, deep-sea chemosynthetic ecosystems are associated with methane cold seeps that with authigenesis usually create carbonate mounds. The single cell organisms responsible for these ecosystems are similar to those found at methane seeps worldwide. Unlike other areas of the deep ocean no methane–associated mud volcanoes have been found on the margin.

Bacterial mats, often white, are seen in video imaging. Some of these systems differ from any others so far described worldwide. For example, there are dense populations of bristle worms in dark sulphide-rich soft sediment microhabitats where there is a high flux of both methane and sulphides. These dark patches have distinctive pitting associated with the worm burrows. Because bristle worms are found at cold seeps worldwide it is possible that the role of aerobic methanotrophy may have been underestimated in seafloor methane chemosynthetic ecosystems, as over 25% of the methane escaping from the Hikurangi Margin cold seeps is metabolised aerobically.

In general such methane seeps have anaerobic single cell organisms in the subsurface anoxic layers, with anaerobic methanotrophic archaea and sulfate-reducing myxococcota. In highly reduced seep habitats the surface is dominated by bacterial mats, while where partial oxidation has happened the bristle worm ecosystem previously mentioned is found associated with aerobic methanotrophic Gammaproteobacteria. Genetically, many of these have been characterised as related to the chemosynthetic endosymbionts of marine invertebrates. Sulfide is exploited as an energy resource by both the tubeworms and the clams. With more advanced oxidation the ecosystem becomes dominated by chemosynthetic frenulate tubeworms of the genus Lamellibrachia closely related to those found in the Lau Basin, and clams, mussels, and various Demospongiae sponges. The saltwater clams are of the genus Calyptogena, the mussels are in the deep-sea sub-family Bathymodiolinae.

== See also ==
- Geology of New Zealand
- Kaikōura Canyon
