= Raurimu Fault =

Fault in New Zealand

- Waimarino Fault
- Known active Raurimu Fault surface traces and closely associated active faults in Ruapehu Graben. For map of other nearby active faults see Taupō Rift.
- Etymology: Raurimu
- Country: New Zealand
- Region: Waikato Region

Characteristics
- Length: 35 km (22 mi)
- Strike: N-S
- Displacement: 1.5 mm (0.059 in)/year

Tectonics
- Plate: Indo-Australian
- Status: Active
- Type: Normal fault
- Movement: 2.8 m (9 ft 2 in)
- Age: Quaternary
- Volcanic arc/belt: Taupō Volcanic Zone
- New Zealand geology database (includes faults)

The Raurimu Fault is the western Taupō rift-bounding north–south striking normal fault complex of the Ruapehu Graben, a seismically active area of the central North Island of New Zealand to the west of Mount Ruapehu.

== Geography ==
It is located near the western side of the Tongariro National Park, mainly in the Erua Forest, where it is along the western Waimarino Stream valley. The northern surface traces of the fault commence near the Raurimu Spiral and the most southern surface is over 35 km (22 mi) to the south just to the east of the township of Raetihi.

=== Geology ===
The northern end of the fault is intersected at the township of National Park by the National Park Fault which is the more northern Taupō Rift western wall fault. Lahar deposits of late Pleistocene (20,000 to 60,000 years ago) are offset by up to 60 m (200 ft). At its southern end the fault alignment is crossed by the east west Ohakune Fault which creates just to the east of Ohakune a quite complex normal fault structure. The north south fault line resumes for a short distance from here until full transition near Raetihi into the east west alignment of the Taupō Rift termination faults beyond the Ruapehu Graben. The dip slip rate is 1.5 mm (0.059 in)/year with the last major displacement being 2.8 m (9 ft 2 in) at 2000 ± 300 years ago. It has a normal sense of throw, and a strike and dip of 005/53°E. A deep earthquake swarm not associated directly with the fault, but which was across it defines it as a shallow fault.

== Risks ==
The size of the characterised displacements indicates major earthquakes typical for the Taupō Rift are possible. The associated north eastern faults have been associated with a recent shallow smaller earthquake swarm.
