= Rangipo Fault =

Fault in New Zealand

- Desert Road Fault, Whangaehu River Fault, Whangaehu Fault
- Known active Rangipo Fault surface traces and closely associated active faults of eastern wall of Ruapehu Graben. For map of other nearby active faults see Taupō Rift.
- Etymology: Rangipo Desert
- Country: New Zealand
- Region: Waikato Region

Characteristics
- Length: 32 km (20 mi)
- Strike: N-S
- Displacement: 1.5 mm (0.059 in)/year (long term average)

Tectonics
- Plate: Indo-Australian
- Status: Active
- Type: Normal fault
- Movement: M_{w} 7.1 potential with whole fault rupture with Wahianoa and Upper Waikato Stream faults
- Age: Quaternary
- Volcanic arc/belt: Taupō Volcanic Zone
- New Zealand geology database (includes faults)

The Rangipo Fault (also known in the past as Desert Road Fault, Whangaehu River Fault, 'Whangaehu Fault) is the eastern Taupō rift-bounding north–south striking normal fault complex of the Ruapehu Graben, a seismically active area of the central North Island of New Zealand to the west of Mount Ruapehu. It could be part of a M_{w} 7.1 potential rupture.

== Geography ==
It is located near the eastern side of the Tongariro National Park, mainly in the Rangipo Desert, and traces have been now characterised on both sides of State Highway 1 where it is known as "the Desert Road" extending for at least 32 km (20 mi). The northern surface traces of the fault commences just south of the Waipakihi Road to the east of the Desert Road and it extends south of the Waiouru Military Camp to almost the south west corner of the army training area.

=== Geology ===
The Upper Waikato Stream Fault is the eastern wall fault to its immediate north and it has been postulated that whole fault rupture of that fault, the Rangipo Fault and the potentially intersecting from the west Wahianoa Fault whose trace may be hidden under Ruapehu eruptives could result in a 7.1 M_{W} event. The north–south fault line transitions into the east–west alignment of the Taupō Rift termination faults beyond the Ruapehu Graben with the Moawhango Fault to the east, the Shawcroft Road Fault to the west and the Snowgrass Fault to its south. Where the fault has been trenched to date it is normal with a NNE strike, and between 80°W dip. During a higher slip-rate period between 25 and 11 cal ka BP there were frequent major plinian eruptions of Mount Ruapehu so there is possibly some interaction with nearby volcanism. The long term dip slip rate from about 144 ka BP for a total displacement of 225 m (738 ft) is 1.5 mm (0.059 in)/year. However displacement since 13.8 cal ka BP has been less than 0.2 mm (0.0079 in)/year.

Recent events Rangipo Fault
Fault event Number	date of last marker before event	Displacement	Note
7	1,720 years BP	0.1 m (3.9 in)	
6	3,520 years BP	0.14 m (5.5 in)	possible match to an Upper Waikato Stream Fault rupture
5	11,000 years BP	0.8 m (2 ft 7 in)	Is about time of Pahoka–Mangamate eruption sequence (vents Ruapehu's northern summit and between Ruapehu and Tongariro).
4	11,000 years BP	0.35 m (1 ft 2 in)	possible match to an Upper Waikato Stream Fault rupture
3	11,770 years BP	1.2 m (3 ft 11 in)	For more than 25 km and possible match to an Upper Waikato Stream Fault rupture
2	11,770 years BP	0.4 m (1 ft 4 in)	Possible match to a Wahianoa Fault rupture
1	13,640 years BP	32 m (105 ft)	Match to a Wahianoa Fault rupture

== Risks ==
The size of the characterised displacements indicates major earthquakes typical for the Taupō Rift are possible. The 32 m (105 ft) displacement assigned to the oldest fault rupture in the above data could be a very disruptive event. For example, the current assumed worse case is from a M_{w} 7.1 event rupturing this and two adjacent faults over 43 km (27 mi) by an average of 2.4 m (7 ft 10 in).
