= Rotomā Caldera =

Volcanic caldera in the North Island of New Zealand

- Rotoma Caldera, Rotomā Embayment
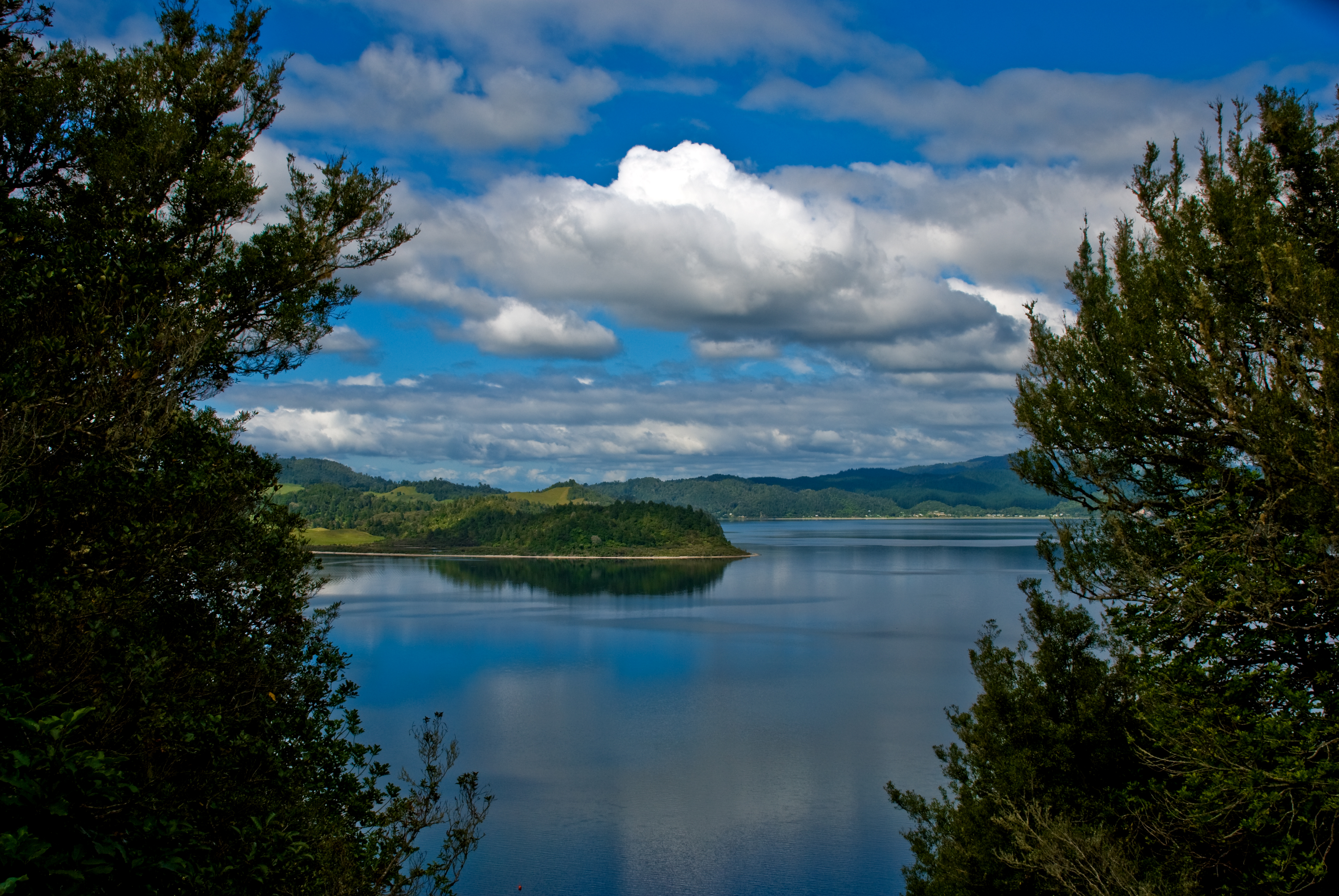
- Lake Rotomā fills the Rotomā Caldera

Highest point
- Elevation: 316 m (1,037 ft)
- Coordinates: 38°05′S 176°35′E

Dimensions
- Width: 5 km (3.1 mi)

Geography
- Location within New Zealand Location within North Island
- Location: North Island
- Country: New Zealand
- Region: Bay of Plenty

Geology
- Rock age: approximately 9,000 years
- Mountain type: Caldera
- Volcanic zone: Taupō Volcanic Zone
- Last eruption: 7412 BCE

Climbing
- Access: State Highway 30 (New Zealand)

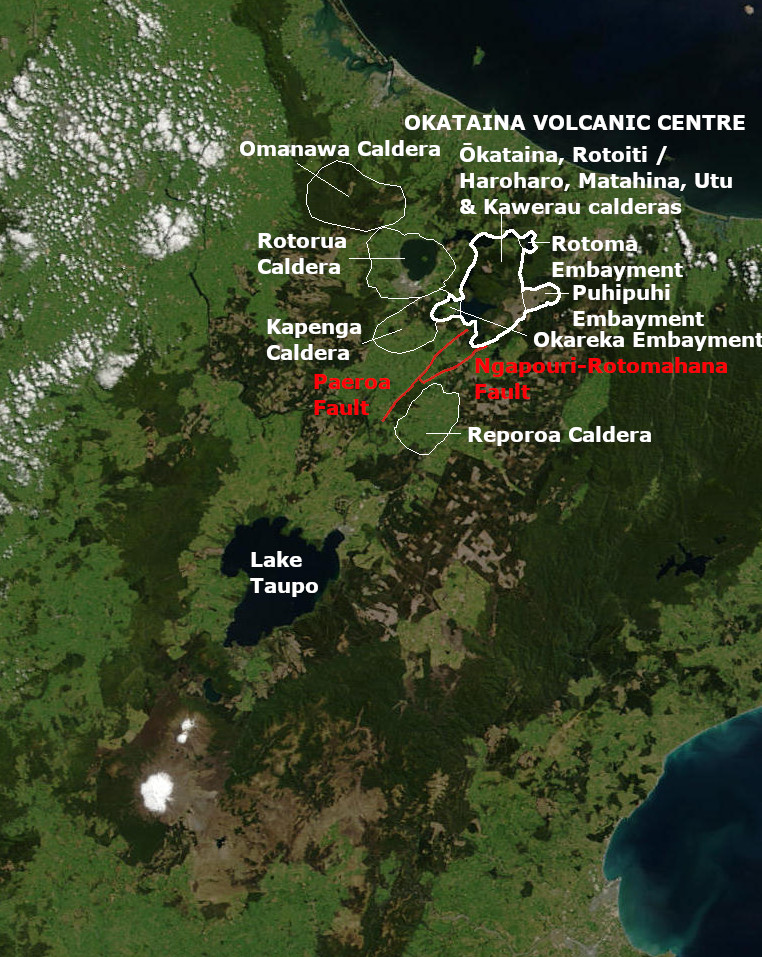
Okataina Volcanic Centre relationships to other nearby volcanic and tectonic structures. The Rotomā Caldera is in its north east.

The relatively small Rotomā Caldera (also known as Rotomā Embayment, Rotomā volcanic complex, and spelled Rotoma) is in the Taupō Volcanic Zone in the North Island of New Zealand.

== Geography ==
The Rotomā Caldera is located halfway between the city of Rotorua and town of Whakatāne, with its in filling Lake Rotomā being the easternmost in the chain of three volcanic lakes to the northeast of Lake Rotorua. The other two are Lake Rotoiti and Lake Rotoehu.

=== Geology ===
The Rotomā Caldera is immediately to the northeast of the area previously called the Haroharo volcanic complex, and now known as the Haroharo vent alignment. This is now regarded as part of the much larger Ōkataina Caldera ( Ōkataina Volcanic Centre). It has been usually classified as part of this volcanic structure, but given the evidence that it is a region of structural collapse beyond the Ōkataina Caldera rim is perhaps best called an embayment. It is associated with the northern fault boundary zone (Rotoehu Fault, Manawahe Fault, North Rotomā Fault, Braemar Fault, Mangaone Fault) in the Whakatāne Graben part of current rift activity in the Taupō Volcanic Zone. The caldera is likely overlying the former drainage valley that historically Lake Rotorua used before the Rotoiti eruption of the Ōkataina Caldera 47,400 ± 1500 years ago. The Rotomā volcano's most prominent feature Lake Rotomā was formed within the Rotomā caldera when lava flows following a large crater explosion blocked its outlet. The major eruption episodes were about 7412 BCE with about 8 km^{3} (1.9 cu mi) of material erupted from 3 different magmas from several different vents. This eruptive sequence was associated in time with ruptures in the Manawahe Fault about 10 km (6.2 mi) to the north-east. It is known that the changes in vegetation following the eruption, while significant, were short-lived. Pre-eruption forest and mire vegetation recovering to former levels within about 106 years.
