= Upper Waikato Stream Fault =

Fault in New Zealand

- Known active faults of eastern wall of Ruapehu Graben including the Upper Waikato Stream Fault. Clicking on the map enables mouse over of fault details. For map of other nearby active faults see Taupō Rift.
- Etymology: Upper Waikato Stream a source tributary of the Tongariro River.
- Country: New Zealand
- Region: Waikato Region

Characteristics
- Length: 15 km (9.3 mi)
- Strike: N-S
- Displacement: 0.63 mm (0.025 in)/year (long term average)

Tectonics
- Plate: Indo-Australian
- Status: Active
- Type: Normal fault
- Movement: M_{w} 6.5
- Age: Quaternary
- Volcanic arc/belt: Taupō Volcanic Zone
- New Zealand geology database (includes faults)

The Upper Waikato Stream Fault is an eastern Taupō rift-bounding north–south striking normal fault in the Ruapehu Graben, a seismically active area of the central North Island of New Zealand to the west of Mount Ruapehu. While its own whole fault rupture potential is M_{w} 6.5, such a rupture could be part of a M_{w} 7.1 multi-fault rupture.

== Geography ==
It is located near the eastern side of the Tongariro National Park, and its surface traces commence to the east of State Highway 1 where it is known as "the Desert Road" and extend to the north east for 15 km (9.3 mi) crossing the top of the Tongariro River and for a short distance into the foothills of the Kaimanawa Mountains.

=== Geology ===
The Upper Waikato Stream Fault is one of the eastern wall faults of the Ruapehu Graben and it is immediately to the north of the longer Rangipo Fault. Its alignment has it as a potential continuation from the west of the Wahianoa Fault. This intersection of the three faults could result in a 7.1 M_{W} event if all three faults had a total rupture. The fault is normal with a NE strike, and about a 75°W dip. From past to present the slip-rate has changed from 0.45 mm (0.018 in)/year between 45 and 36.1 ka BP to 1.5 mm (0.059 in)/year for an active period between 36.1 and 23.65 ka BP and after the Taupō Volcano Oruanui eruption it has reduced to 0.26 mm (0.010 in)/year. It is believed to have been activated by this eruption.

Recent events Upper Waikato Stream Fault
Fault event Number	date of last marker before event	Max Displacement	Note
12	3,520 years BP	0.86 m (2 ft 10 in)	possible match to a Rangipo Fault rupture
11	11,000 years BP	1.2 m (3 ft 11 in)	possible match to a Rangipo Fault rupture Is about times of Pahoka–Mangamate eruption sequence (vents Ruapehu's northern summit and between Ruapehu and Tongariro).
10	11,770 years BP	3.78 m (12.4 ft)	probable match to a Rangipo Fault rupture
9	25,400 years BP	0.17 m (6.7 in)	before 17,700 years BP
8	25,400 years BP	2.2 m (7 ft 3 in)	At time of Oruanui eruption
7	27,000 years BP	0.92 m (3 ft 0 in)	
6	27,000 years BP	2.76 m (9 ft 1 in)	
5	28,200 years BP	1.24 m (4 ft 1 in)	
4	36,100 years BP to 28,200 years BP	1.79 m (5 ft 10 in)	
3	36,100 years BP to 28,200 years BP	1.21 m (4 ft 0 in)	
2	36,100 years BP	5.64 m (18.5 ft)	
1	45,500 years BP or more	1.75 m (5 ft 9 in)	

== Risks ==
The current assumed worse case is from a M_{w} 7.1 event rupturing this and two adjacent faults over 43 km (27 mi) by an average of 2.4 m (7 ft 10 in). A 15 km (9.3 mi) whole fault rupture of the Upper Waikato Stream Fault by an average of 0.8 m (2 ft 7 in) would create a M_{w} 6.5 event.
