= 1904 Cape Turnagain earthquake =

Earthquake in New Zealand

- Location within New Zealand
- UTC time: 1904-08-08 22:50:00
- ISC event: 16957823
- USGS-ANSS: n/a
- Local date: 9 August 1904
- Local time: 10:20 am NZDT (UTC+12)
- Magnitude: M_{s} 6.9 M_{S} 6.8, M_{w} 7.0–7.2
- Depth: 16 km (9.9 mi)
- Epicentre: 40.40°S 176.65°E
- Areas affected: New Zealand
- Max. intensity: MMI IX (Violent)
- Casualties: 1 fatality, unknown number of injured

The 1904 Cape Turnagain earthquake struck 10 kilometres (6.2 mi) north of Cape Turnagain on the morning of 9 August with a magnitude estimated at 6.8 M_{s} and 7.0–7.2 M_{w}. It was felt throughout the North Island and upper South Island, with many communities within a 500 kilometres (310 mi) radius reporting noticeable ground shaking. Heavy damage occurred to the landscape and personal property and one man died. It was the largest to strike New Zealand since the 7.0 M_{w} North Canterbury earthquake in 1888.

== Tectonic setting ==
New Zealand lies along the boundary between the Indo-Australian plate and Pacific plate.

- In the South Island, most of the relative displacement between these plates is taken up along a single dextral (right lateral) strike-slip fault with a major reverse component, the Alpine Fault.
- In the North Island, displacement is mainly taken up along the Kermadec-Tonga subduction zone, although the remaining dextral strike-slip component is accommodated by the North Island Fault System. Subduction off the coast takes place at the Hikurangi Trough, which runs parallel to the East Coast of the North Island and is the southern extension from the Kermadec Trench, however earthquakes here occur less frequently.

The 1904 earthquake struck approximately 40 kilometres (25 mi) to the west of the Hikurangi Trough, on the shallow plate interface between the Pacific and Australian plates, approximately 16 km beneath the surface.

== Epicentre ==
Initially when the earthquake struck, the given epicentre being Cape Turnagain was only an estimation. The earthquake was recorded on the worldwide Milne seismograph network and on other seismographs in Europe, but very few of these still exist to this day. Seismograph data of the earthquake was held at stations in Melbourne and Honolulu, as well as various sites across New Zealand. It was with those recordings that seismologists could confirm that the true epicentre of the earthquake was indeed Cape Turnagain, only being about 10 km off from the estimation.

== Damage ==
The earthquake caused massive amounts of damage to the surrounding landscape, with landslides being reported in an area of over 3,500 km^{2} between Napier and Featherston. Liquefaction and sand fountains were also reported in several towns, including Napier, Porangahau and Carterton. Property damage occurred on a mass scale, with cracked walls, broken windows and fallen chimneys being the most common structural problems. In Gladstone, a hillside house was completely destroyed, and multiple buildings across the lower North Island burnt down. Personal items such as cutlery, glassware and furniture were reportedly damaged from as far afield as Wellington and Wairoa, both about 180 kilometres (110 mi) from the epicentre.

The ground damage recorded in the Cape Turnagain earthquake is noted for being distinctly different from other earthquakes in the area, such as Hawke's Bay in 1931, Pahiatua in 1934 and Masterton in June and August 1942. For example, there were more widespread landsliding and a larger amount of liquefaction. The distribution of landscape deformation such as landsliding was very extensive (about 3,500 km^{2}) and significant landslides were triggered at considerable distances.

=== Landslides ===
Heavy rockfall was recorded along the Hawke's Bay and Wairarapa coastline, where the Mercalli intensity of the earthquake was VII and VIII. The cliffs from Cape Kidnappers to Bluff Hill, at Blackhead, Cape Turnagain as well as the inland McLaughlin cliffs and hills in the Pohangina Valley had severe rockfall occur. There was also a reported rockfall from the Hatepe pumice cliffs in Lake Taupō, 215 km away, where estimated shaking from the event was only III.

Numerous landslides were reported in and around Herbertville, and on the summit of Puketoi Range near Masterton. Tauweru, also near Masterton, reported rocks and boulders of up to 1 metre in diameter tumble down hill with some small landslides occurring. In Napier, several tonnes of rock fell from Bluff Hill during the earthquake and smaller slips continually occurred for at least three days with each passing aftershock. Many landslides also occurred near Wimbledon, with the largest landslide being near the top of Sergeant's Hill, about a 40–50-meter wide slump gave way, taking down hundreds of trees with it.

=== Liquefaction ===
Liquefaction occurred at 12 distinct sites, all within a 120 km radius of the epicentre. These sites were at Napier, Taradale, Tutaekuri River, Otane, Tukituki River, Porangahau Township, and Porangahau Beach (all within Hawke's Bay), and Herbertville, Castlepoint, Whakataki, Gladstone, and Carterton (all within the Wairarapa). One eyewitness report from Napier stated "A gentleman who was driving along the beach road at the time of the disturbance, happened to look over to the Whare-o-Maraenui reserve, where he saw large quantities of mud thrown 10 ft into the air in several places."

An excerpt from the Manawatu Evening standard of 12 August read: "Following the earthquake shock and fall of earth off the cliffs at Gladstone, innumerable small holes appeared on the flat adjacent, spouting bluish mud and sand like miniature geysers. They ceased when the shake was over.... When the rumbling commenced ... the river seemed to rise from its bed and fall back again, and the bridge swayed and reeled. McLaughlin's cliffs seemed to stagger, and then some thousands of tons of face fell with a roar into the Makaha creek, forcing the water over the flat, and strewing the land with eels and small trout. Mud and water shot into the air from a hundred holes in the earth around – like miniature volcanoes.... James Green, who was digging out an embedded rock nearby, was thrown violently, the ground opening under him a foot wide, spurting mud and water over him.... The flat presents an interesting spectacle, being punctured by numbers of small volcano-like craters, through which the mud and water spouted."

=== Fires ===
Several fires ignited after the earthquake. In Waipawa, Tamumu School burnt down, as did two houses in Wanstead and Tawataia. Several other fires burnt on, but were extinguished before extensive damage could be done.

=== Casualties ===
The earthquake caused a few injuries, although the exact number of injured is unknown. The death of an elderly man near Eketahuna was reported, "presumably from stroke or heart attack".

== See also ==
- List of earthquakes in 1904
- List of earthquakes in New Zealand
