= National Park Fault =

Fault zone in New Zealand

- National Park Fault Zone
- Known active National Park Fault Zone surface traces. For map of other nearby active faults see Taupō Rift.
- Etymology: National Park, New Zealand
- Country: New Zealand
- Region: Waikato Region

Characteristics
- Range: Up to 6.1 Mw
- Segments: 2
- Strike: NNE

Tectonics
- Plate: Indo-Australian
- Status: Active
- Type: Normal fault
- Age: Miocene-Holocene
- Volcanic arc/belt: Taupō Volcanic Zone
- New Zealand geology database (includes faults)

The National Park Fault is the western Taupō rift-bounding NNE-striking normal fault complex of the Tongariro Graben, a seismically active area of the central North Island of New Zealand south of Lake Taupō that contains Mount Tongariro.

== Geography ==
It is located near the western side of the Tongariro National Park. The northern surface traces of the fault zone are found on the slopes of Kuharua, a 1,129 metres (3,704 ft) high rhyolitic volcano and extend southwards around Lake Otamangakau and Lake Te Whaiau, lakes developed as part of the Tongariro Power Scheme. The western traces here are just to the west of the mutual dams of these lakes on the eastern slopes of the Maungakatote andesitic volcano and then peter out. The definitive fault surface trace commences in the hills near the headwaters of the Okupata stream just to the west of State Highway 47 and extends south close on 20 km (12 mi) to National Park township just to the south of the Railway Station.

=== Geology ===
The southern end of the fault joins the Raurimu Fault, just south of National Park, which is the continuation southward of this Taupō Rift western wall fault. The forested hill country to the west of the fault is demarcated well from the valley of the Tongariro Graben, which is filled with recent volcanic (and sedimentary) deposits of tephra.

== Risks ==
The fault itself has the potential to be associated with up to 6.1 M_{W} magnitude earthquakes with a recurrence interval of about 4000 years. The faults in the zone deliver smaller earthquakes much more often, with the potential for landslips and other local damage.
