= Taupō Rift termination faults =

Fault zone in New Zealand

- Ohakune Fault, Raetihi North Fault, Raetihi South Fault, Waipuna Fault, Oruakukuru Fault, Rangiahu Fault, Maketu Stream Fault (Maketu Trace), Karioi Fault, Wahianoa Fault, Snowgrass Fault, Shawcroft Road Fault, Moawhango Fault
- Known active east - west Taupō Rift termination fault surface traces in the Ruapehu Graben. Click on the map to enable mouse over of fault details and to zoom in to show relationship Ohakune Fault and Ohakune volcanic complex. For map of other nearby active faults see Taupō Rift.
- Etymology: Ohakune, Raetihi, Wahianoa River, Moawhango
- Country: New Zealand
- Region: Manawatū-Whanganui and Waikato Regions

Characteristics
- Strike: mainly E-W

Tectonics
- Plate: Indo-Australian
- Status: Active
- Type: Normal fault
- Movement: M_{w} 7.1 potential
- Age: Quaternary
- Volcanic arc/belt: Taupō Volcanic Zone
- New Zealand Active Fault database

The seismically active southern end of the Taupō Rift beyond Mount Ruapehu has a number of mainly east to west orientated termination faults where the western wall Raurimu Fault and eastern wall Rangipo Fault (Desert Road Fault) terminate in the Ruapehu Graben, of the central North Island of New Zealand. In a multi-fault rupture event there is the potential for the earthquake being of M_{w} 7.1 magnitude.

The faults can be classified as belonging to three normal fault sets:

1. Ruapehu Graben NNE‐trending faults
  - Raurimu Fault - see separate article
  - Rangipo Fault (Desert Road Fault) - see separate article
  - Mostly uncharacterised faults under Mount Ruapehu
2. Ohakune‐Raetihi fault set that is 15 km (9.3 mi) wide of E‐W to ESE‐WNW‐trending faults
  - Ohakune Fault
  - Raetihi North and South faults
  - Waipuna Fault
  - Oruakukuru Fault
  - Rangiahu Fault
  - Maketu Stream Fault (Maketu Trace)
3. Karioi fault set that is 24 km (15 mi) wide of NE‐trending faults
  - Karioi Fault
  - Wahianoa Fault
  - Snowgrass Fault
  - Shawcroft Road Fault
  - Moawhango Fault

== Ohakune Fault ==
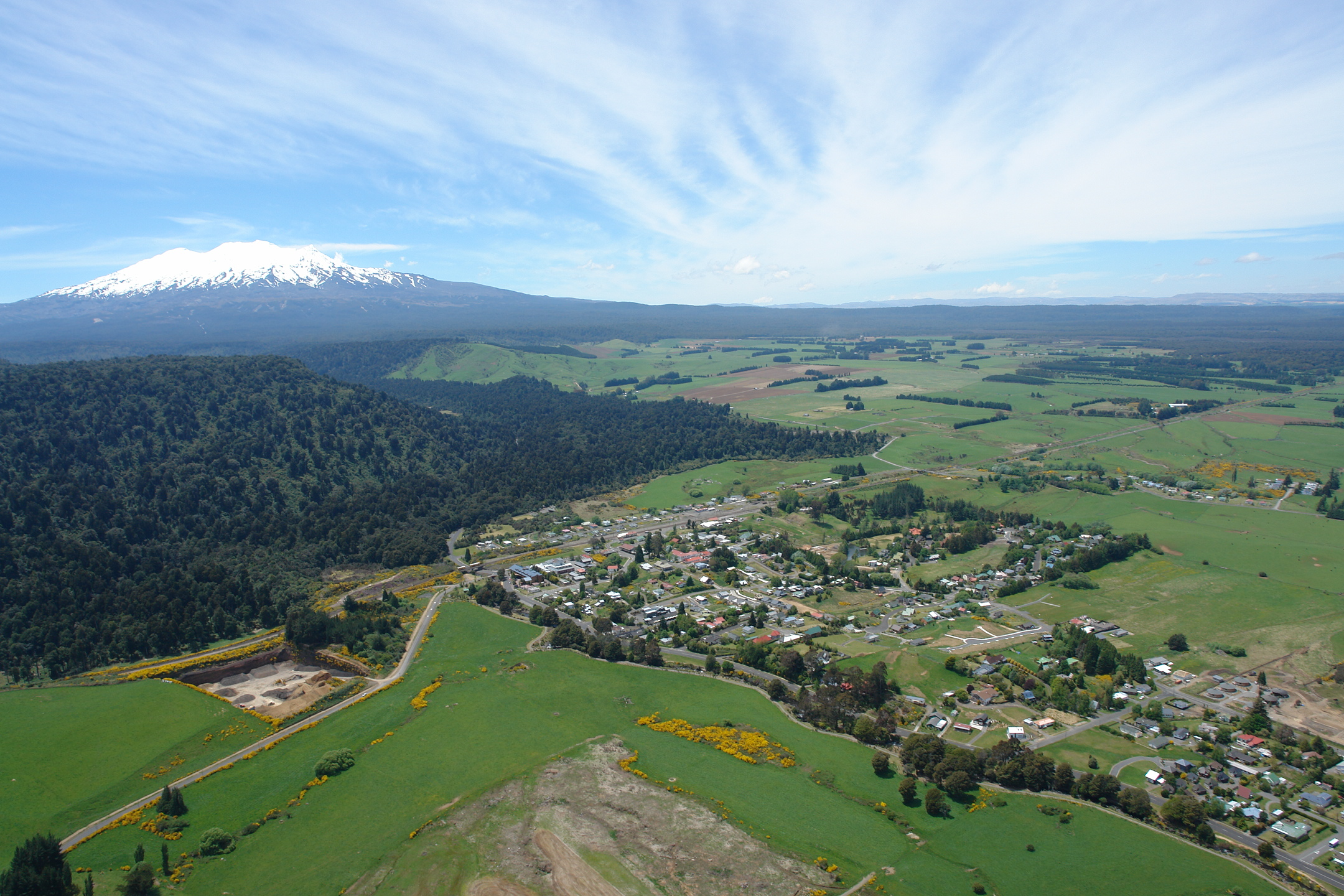
The Ohakune fault is just within the foreground tree line at the bottom of the hill (quarry in foreground is part of a small extinct volcano) beyond the town of Ohakune in this view towards the east and Mount Ruapehu.

This most northerly of the cross faults extends 24 km (15 mi) from northwest of Tohunga Junction into the Rangataua Forest. At Tohunga Junction it crosses the Raurimu Fault with a complex series of faults. The fault to the west of this junction region has 65 m (213 ft) of vertical displacement and to the east there is only 55 m (180 ft). This downthrown to the south normal fault has been active for over 18,000 years and has a dip-slip displacement rate of 3.5 mm (0.14 in)/year.

The Ohakune volcanic complex (Rochfort ejecta ring and craters) which erupted about 31,500 years ago is situated on and aligned with the fault just north of the town.

== Raetihi faults ==
The E - W trending 6 km (3.7 mi) of the Raetihi North Fault is downthrown to the south while the 2.5 km (1.6 mi) Raetihi South Fault is downthrown to the north so they have a small graben between them. The Raetihi South Fault possibly continues along the Mangahowhi Stream for up to 5 km (3.1 mi). Displacement rates based on an age of 18,000 years for the scarps are 0.5 mm (0.020 in)/year for the Raetihi North Fault and 0.4 mm (0.016 in)/year for the Raetihi South Fault.

== Waipuna Fault ==
South of the Raetihi faults, the most western of the faults discussed, the Waipuna Fault is downthrown to the south and extends 16 km (9.9 mi) from the Waimarino Forest to intersept the Karioi Fault. The displacement rate might be 0.4 mm (0.016 in)/year but this has an error of the same order.

== Oruakukuru Fault ==
The Oruakukuru Fault to the south of the Waipuna Fault commences at State Highway 4 (New Zealand) close to the upper Mangawhero River extending 9 km (5.6 mi) also intersects the Karioi Fault and has a displacement rate of 0.7 mm (0.028 in)/year.

== Snowgrass Fault ==
The south east Taupō Rift is associated with a 35 km (22 mi) northeast trending dome south of the Ngamatea Swamp where the Rangipo Fault terminates. The Snowgrass Fault on the northern side of this dome is a downthrown to the south normal fault that is displacing at an estimated 0.55 mm (0.022 in)/year.

== Shawcroft Road Fault ==
The 7 km (4.3 mi) Shawcroft Road Fault cuts across the Rangipo Fault line just to the north east of the Waiouru Military Camp and is displacing at 0.7 mm (0.028 in)/year.

== Karioi Fault ==
The normal Karioi Fault is parallel and to the north of the Shawcroft Road Fault and is 22 km (14 mi) long with a summed displacement for its two strands of 0.55 mm (0.022 in)/year.

== Wahianoa Fault ==
The Wahianoa Fault is a northeast-striking presumed normal fault across the southeast flank of Mount Ruapehu extending at least 10 km (6.2 mi) from the Ohakune Fault towards the Rangipo Fault and the Upper Waikato Stream Fault with a displacement rate of 0.3 mm (0.012 in)/year. It has been postulated that it has the potential to do a whole fault rupture at the same time as whole fault rupture of the Rangipo and Upper Waikato Stream faults which would result in a M_{w} 7.1 event rupturing 43 km (27 mi) by an average of 2.4 m (7 ft 10 in)

Recent events Wahianoa Fault
Fault event Number	date of last marker before event	Max Displacement	Note
9	11,200 years BP	6 m (20 ft)	Minor rupture Upper Waikato Stream Fault may have occurred
8	11,200 + years BP	5.5 m (18 ft)	Minor rupture Upper Waikato Stream Fault may have occurred, this is about time of Pahoka–Mangamate eruption sequence (vents Ruapehu's northern summit and between Ruapehu and Tongariro).
7	11,770 years BP	1.76 m (5 ft 9 in)	
6	15,000 + years BP	12 m (39 ft)	
5	17,700 years BP	7 m (23 ft)	
4	17,700 + years BP	2.22 m (7 ft 3 in)	
3	36,100 + years BP	2 m (6 ft 7 in)	
2	45,000 + years BP	2 m (6 ft 7 in)	
1	133,000 + years BP	1.21 m (4 ft 0 in)	
