= 1987 Edgecumbe earthquake =

Earthquake in New Zealand

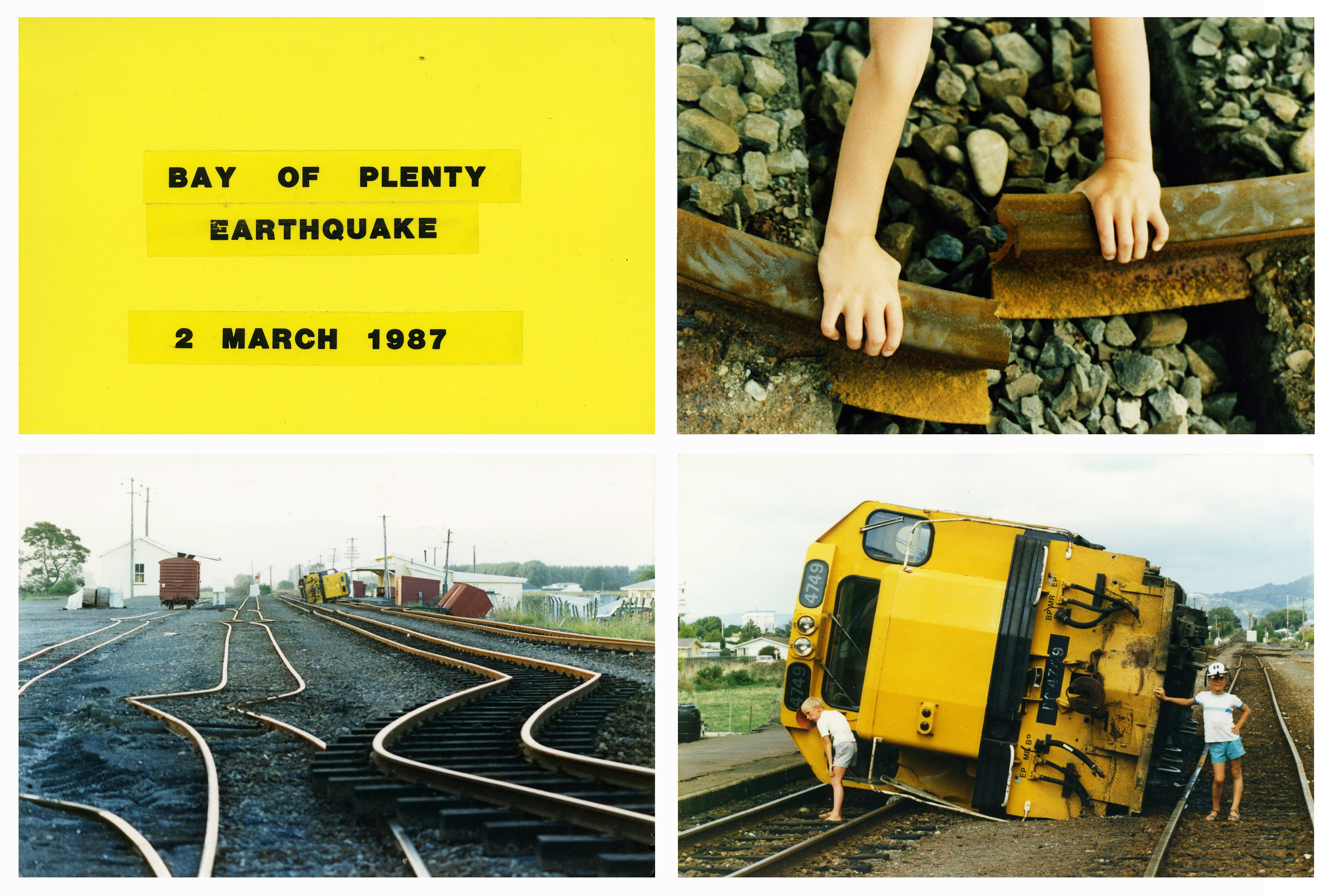

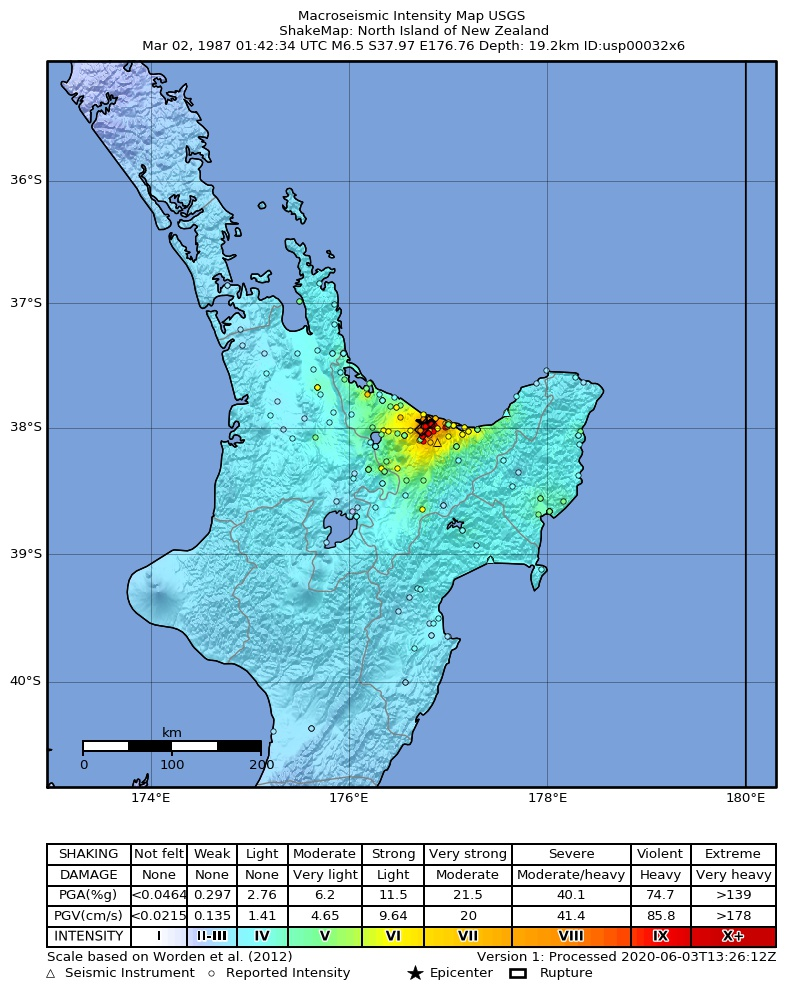

- Location within New Zealand
- UTC time: 1987-03-02 01:42:34
- ISC event: 470420
- USGS-ANSS: ComCat
- Local date: 2 March 1987
- Local time: 1:42 pm NZDT (UTC+13)
- Magnitude: 6.5 M_{w}
- Depth: 8 kilometres (5 mi)
- Epicentre: 37.88°S 176.84°E
- Type: Normal
- Areas affected: New Zealand
- Max. intensity: MMI X (Extreme)
- Peak acceleration: 0.33 g
- Tsunami: None
- Casualties: 1 dead (indirect), 25 injured

The 1987 Edgecumbe earthquake measured 6.5 on the moment magnitude scale and struck the Bay of Plenty region of New Zealand at 1.42 pm on 2 March. The hypocentre was at a shallow depth of 8 km. The epicentre was 2.24 kilometres (1.39 mi) south-south-east of the town of Matatā, and 15 kilometres (9.3 mi) north-north-west of Edgecumbe, on the Rangitaiki Plains (the floodplain of the Rangitaiki River, the Tarawera River and the Whakatāne River). It was the most damaging earthquake New Zealand had experienced since the 1968 Inangahua earthquake.

== Main event ==
The main shock was preceded for two weeks by earthquake swarms in two areas of the Bay of Plenty. A swarm started on 21 February off-shore from Maketu, near Te Puke, 40 kilometres from the main shock's epicentre, and another swarm started on 26 February between Matatā and Thornton, very close to the epicentre. Then there was a 5.2 M_{L} earthquake at 1.35 pm on 2 March, followed by the main shock seven minutes later. The main shock appears to have actually consisted of two ruptures, and possibly a third. There were indications that the first rupture propagated towards the south-west, triggering a second rupture 9 kilometres to the south-west and three seconds after the first. There is also the possibility of a third, significantly smaller, rupture another ten seconds later. The largest aftershock measured 5.6 and struck nine minutes later at 1.51 pm.

Eleven ground-surface ruptures occurred in the Rangitaiki Plains, though no active faults had previously been recognised on the Plains. The largest rupture, the Edgecumbe Fault, was 7 kilometres (4.3 mi) long and formed on, and extended, a late Holocene fault scarp. The old scarp had previously been unrecognised, but was later seen in aerial photographs taken before the earthquake. The northern end of the scarp is one kilometre east of Edgecumbe, and the scarp runs southwest to a point three kilometres north of Te Teko. The land on the north-western side dropped by up to 2.1 metres (6.9 ft), and that area is now more prone to flooding. The most spectacular feature of the scarp was a deep prominent fissure up to 3 metres wide and 3–4 metres deep, mostly with near-vertical walls, that opened up along the fault. It appears that the fault has ruptured at least once previously in the past 1800 years. The intense ground shaking led to a large number of ground surface failures, including sand boils, ridge-top shatters and debris avalanches on steeper slopes.

The Rangitaiki Plains is part of the Whakatāne Graben and both lie within the Taupō Volcanic Zone, which is widening and subsiding. During the Edgecumbe earthquake, the area widened by 1.2 metres and dropped in height by 2 m (6 ft 7 in).

The most damage was in the towns of Edgecumbe, Te Teko, Kawerau, Matatā and Thornton, where chimneys toppled and poorly constructed houses were seriously damaged. The hardest hit was Edgecumbe, with damage to approximately 50% of its houses. There was extensive damage to its milk factory, with large storage tanks toppled. Railway tracks in the town were bent and buckled, and an 80-tonne New Zealand Railways DC class locomotive toppled over.

Twenty-five people suffered injuries that needed medical attention, but no-one was killed. The foreshock seven minutes before the main shock had cut the power supply, and many people had moved away from heavy machinery and out of buildings that then collapsed in the main earthquake.

== Gallery ==
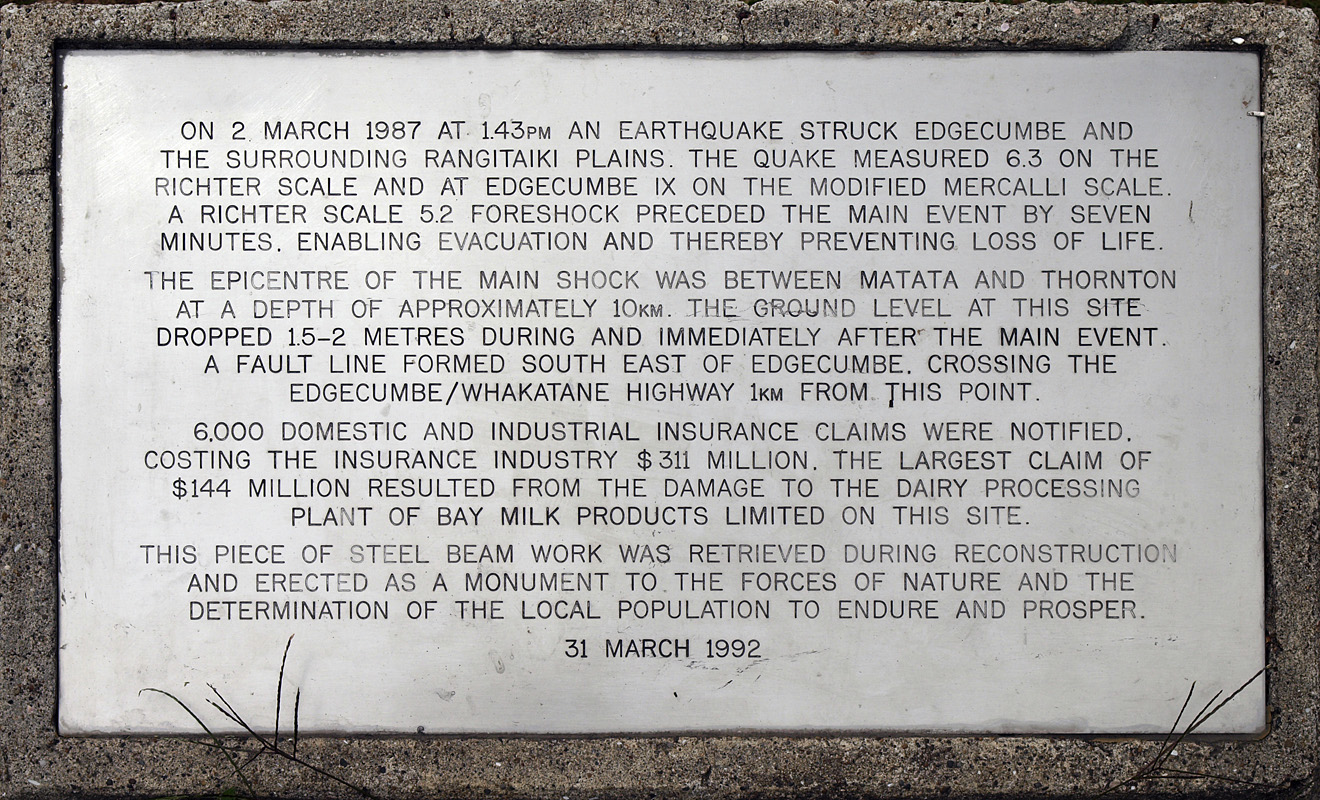
Commemoration plaque

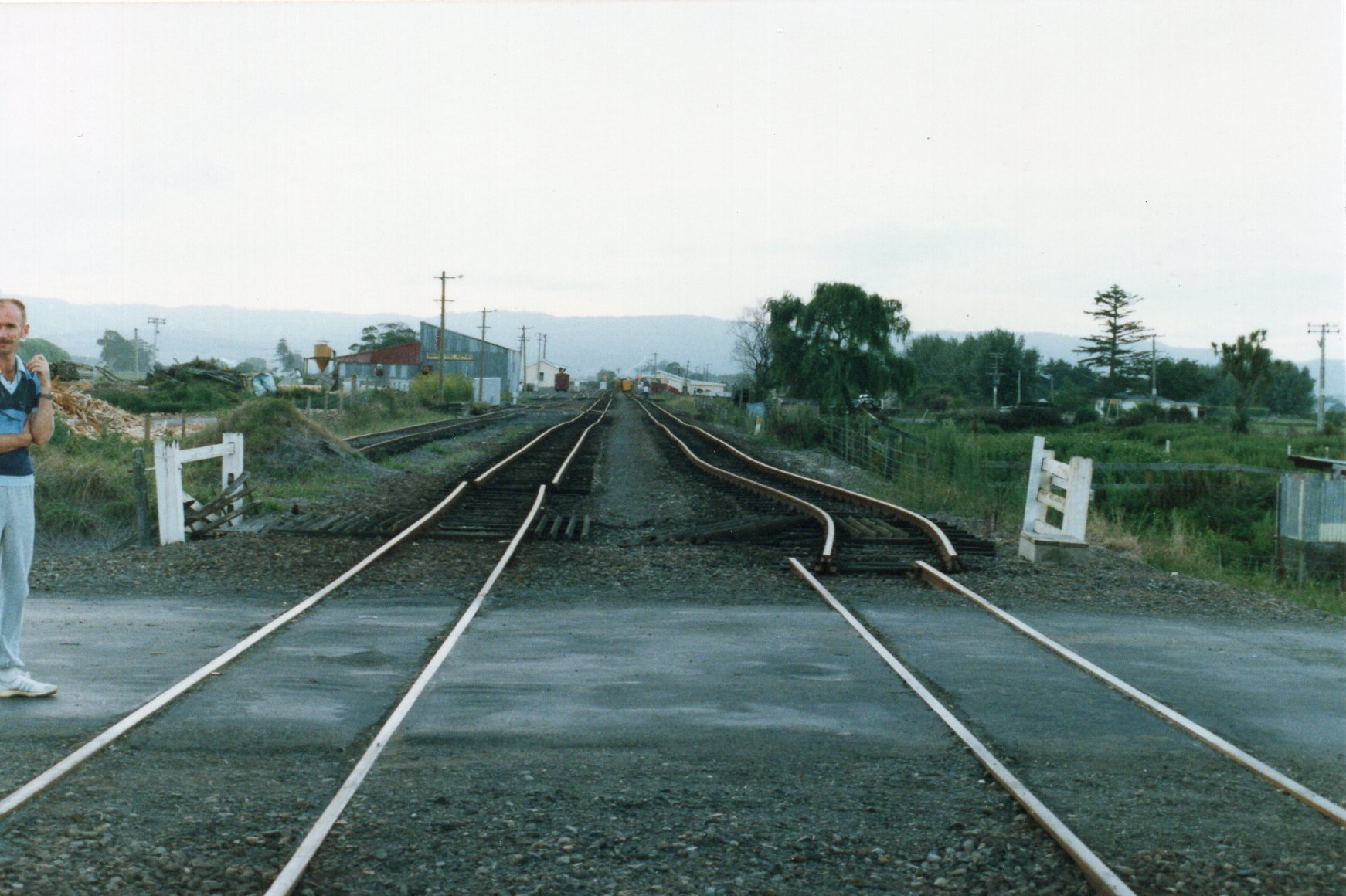
Damaged Railway tracks

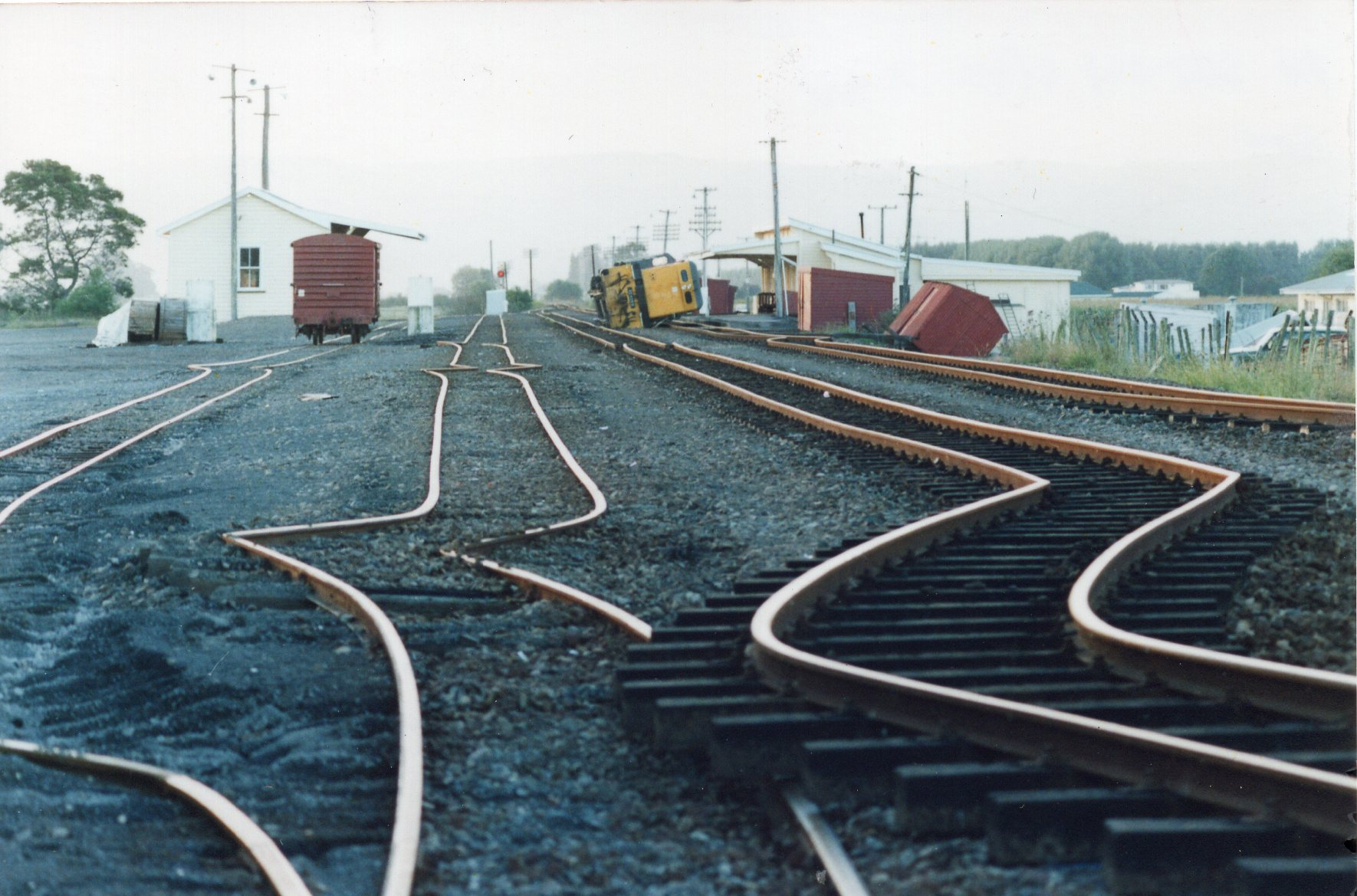
Damaged Railway Tracks

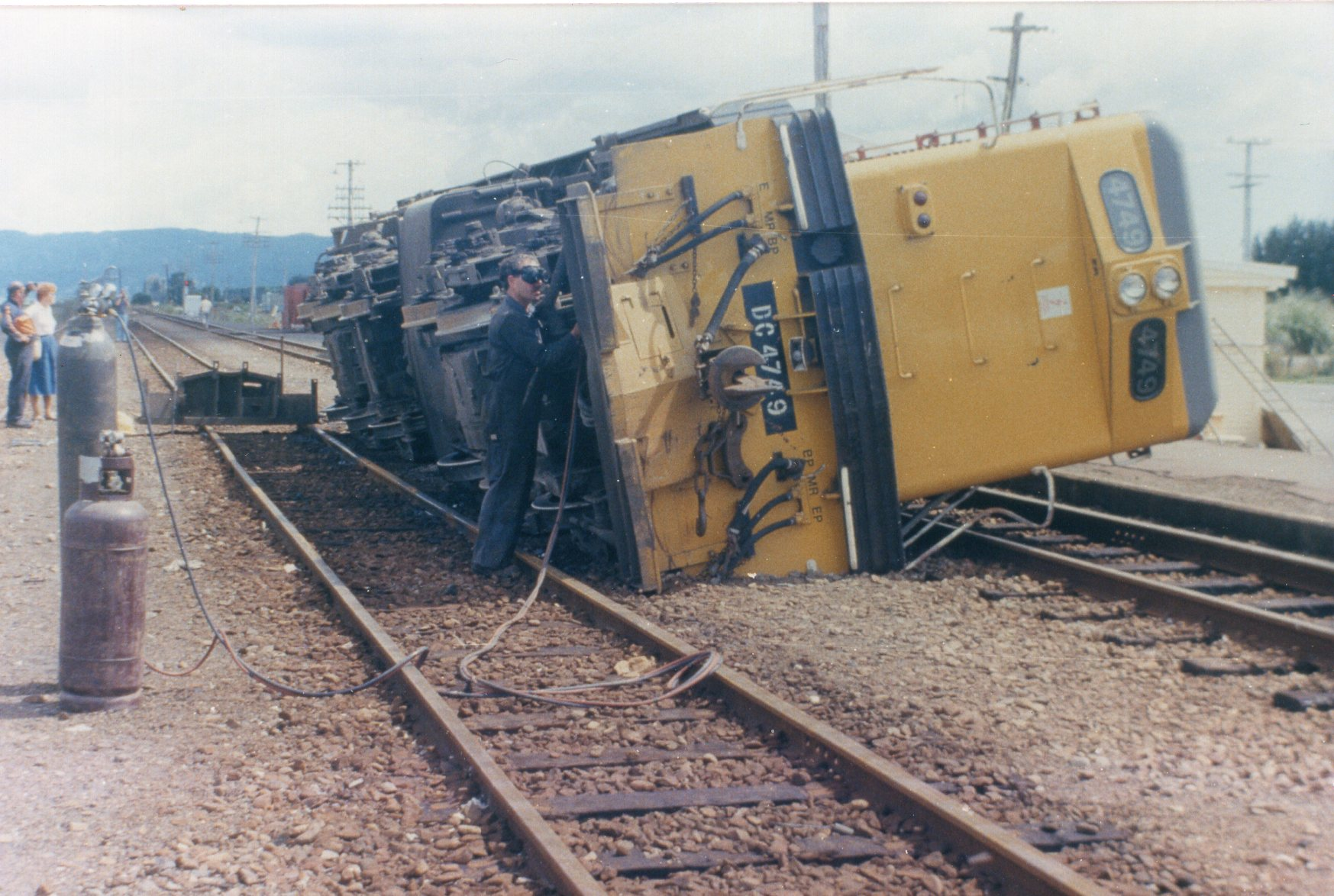
Toppled over DC class locomotive

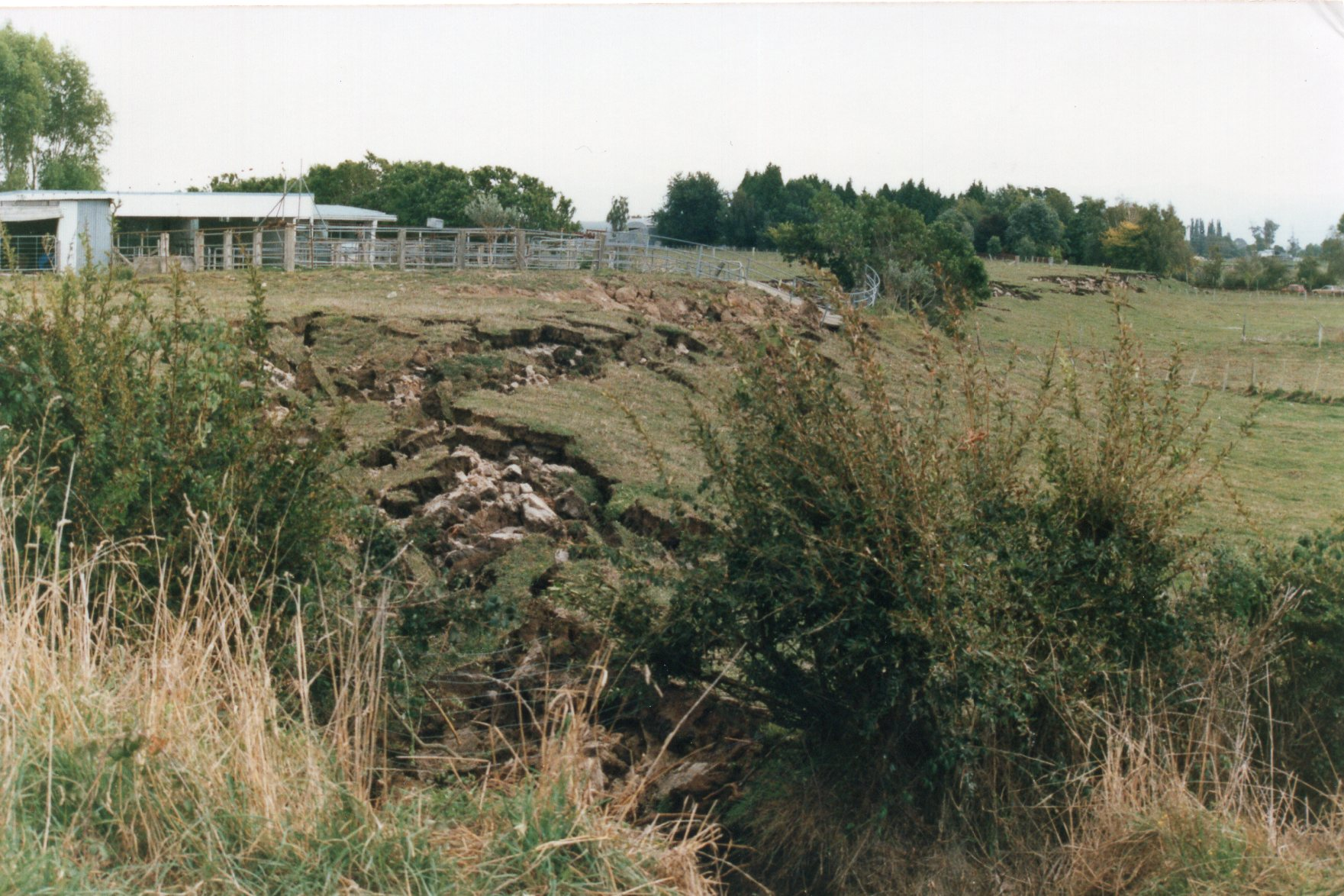
Fractured farmland

== See also ==
- List of earthquakes in New Zealand
