= Kermadec plate =

Tectonic plate in the south Pacific Ocean

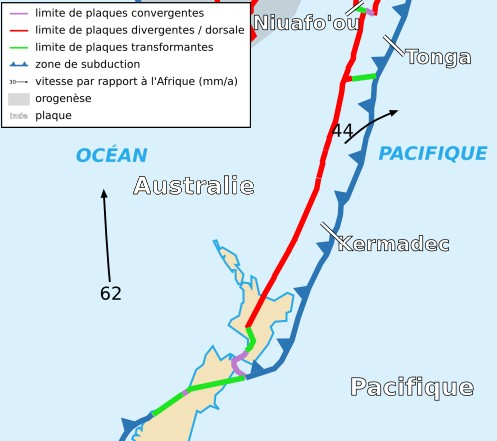
The Kermadec plate

The Kermadec plate is a long and narrow tectonic plate located west of the Kermadec Trench in the south Pacific Ocean. Also included on this tectonic plate is a small portion of the North Island of New Zealand to the east of the Taupō Rift and the Kermadec Islands. It is separated from the Australian plate by a long divergent boundary which forms a back-arc basin. This area is highly prone to earthquakes and tsunamis.

The Pacific plate east to west convergence rates with the Australian and Kermadec plates are among the fastest on Earth, being 8 cm (3.1 in) per year in the north and 4.5 cm (1.8 in) per year in the south.

== See also ==
- Tonga-Kermadec Ridge
