= 1934 Pahiatua earthquake =

Earthquake in New Zealand

1934 Pahiatua (Horoeka) earthquake
- Location within New Zealand
- UTC time: 1934-03-05 11:46:22
- ISC event: 904826
- USGS-ANSS: ComCat
- Local date: 5 March 1934
- Local time: 11:46 p.m. NZDT
- Magnitude: 7.6 M_{s}
- Depth: 12 km (7 mi)
- Epicentre: 40.55°S 176.29°E
- Areas affected: New Zealand
- Max. intensity: MMI IX (Violent)
- Casualties: 2 deaths (indirect), 1 injured

The 1934 Pahiatua earthquake struck at 11:46 pm on 5 March, causing severe damage in much of the lower North Island. Wairarapa, Wellington and Hawke's Bay (which was still recovering from the 1931 Hawke's Bay earthquake) felt the strongest levels of shaking, with much of New Zealand feeling the tremor.

This earthquake has historically been referred to as the Pahiatua earthquake, but recent reviews of its epicentre place it closer to the locality of Horoeka.

It was felt as far north as Auckland, and the shaking was also felt in the mainland of the northern South Island, and along the east coast as far as Dunedin. Destructive intensities of VIII (Severe) were experienced in an area that extended approximately 8700 km2 over most of the lower North Island, and reached a peak of IX (Violent) south-east of Pahiatua, between the small towns of Pongaroa and Bideford.

== Tectonic setting ==
The eastern part of North Island lies on the Hikurangi Margin, where the Pacific plate is subducting obliquely beneath the Australian plate. The dextral (right lateral) component of the convergence is accommodated in the overlying plate by a series of dextral strike-slip faults, known as the North Island Fault System.

== Earthquake characteristics ==
The earthquake had an estimated magnitude of 7.6 on the surface-wave magnitude scale and 7.2–7.4 on the moment magnitude scale. The epicentre was originally assumed to be near Pahiatua, based on the severity of damage, but further analysis of seismograms from the event, the distribution of felt intensities and the location of aftershocks suggested that it was located near Horoeka. Results of trenching across the Waipukaka Fault suggests that this was the causative fault for the earthquake.

== Damage ==
The earthquake was most severe in the Hawke's Bay and northern Wairarapa regions (now the Tararua District est. 1989), and caused widespread damage from Porangahau to Castlepoint. Much of this area, particularly towards the east coast, was sparsely populated at the time, but the shaking caused extensive damage in the town of Pahiatua, where a number of poorly constructed buildings were severely damaged or collapsed entirely. Two people with existing health problems died from heart failure, and one person sustained injuries that required hospitalisation. The movement also triggered numerous small landslides in the cliffs along the coast from Cape Turnagain to Castlepoint, and deformed the ground surface in a number of localities.

== See also ==
- List of earthquakes in 1934
- List of earthquakes in New Zealand
