= Whakatāne Graben =

Geological structure in New Zealand

- Graben
- Map centred upon Whakatane Graben. Clicking on the map enlarges it, and enables panning and mouseover of fault name/wikilink and display of more individual fault data. Active Taupō Volcanic Zone faults at the north east extreme of the Taupo Rift are red, active faults of the North Island Shear Belt are purple for context and nominally inactive faults are black but these have not usually been added to minimise complexity. Relevant recent earthquake areas are shown in yellow shading associated with the 1987 Edgecumbe earthquake and with recent earthquake swarms in white shading.
- Location within North Island
- Coordinates: 38°00′S 176°48′E
- Part of: Taupō Rift
- Age: Quaternary

Dimensions
  - Length: 15 km (9.3 mi) on shore and 50 km (31 mi) off shore
  - Width: 20 km (12 mi)
  - Depth: 2 km (1.2 mi)
- Volcanic zone: Taupō Volcanic Zone
- Last eruption: 2019 Whakaari / White Island eruption

The Whakatāne Graben (also Whakatane Graben) is a predominantly normal faulting tectonic feature of the northeastern aspect of the young, modern Taupō Rift in New Zealand. At the coast it is widening by about 7 mm (0.28 in)/year. This very geologically active graben was the site of the 1987 Edgecumbe earthquake, which caused up to 2 m (6 ft 7 in) of land subsidence. The discontinuity in the Taupō Volcanic Zone's faults imposed by the highly active Ōkataina Volcanic Centre, geography and geology mean the graben is usually regarded as including the actively expanding and lowering region onshore extending towards the coast. Some scientists have limited the Whakatāne Graben to only the offshore continuation of the Taupō Rift.

== Geography ==
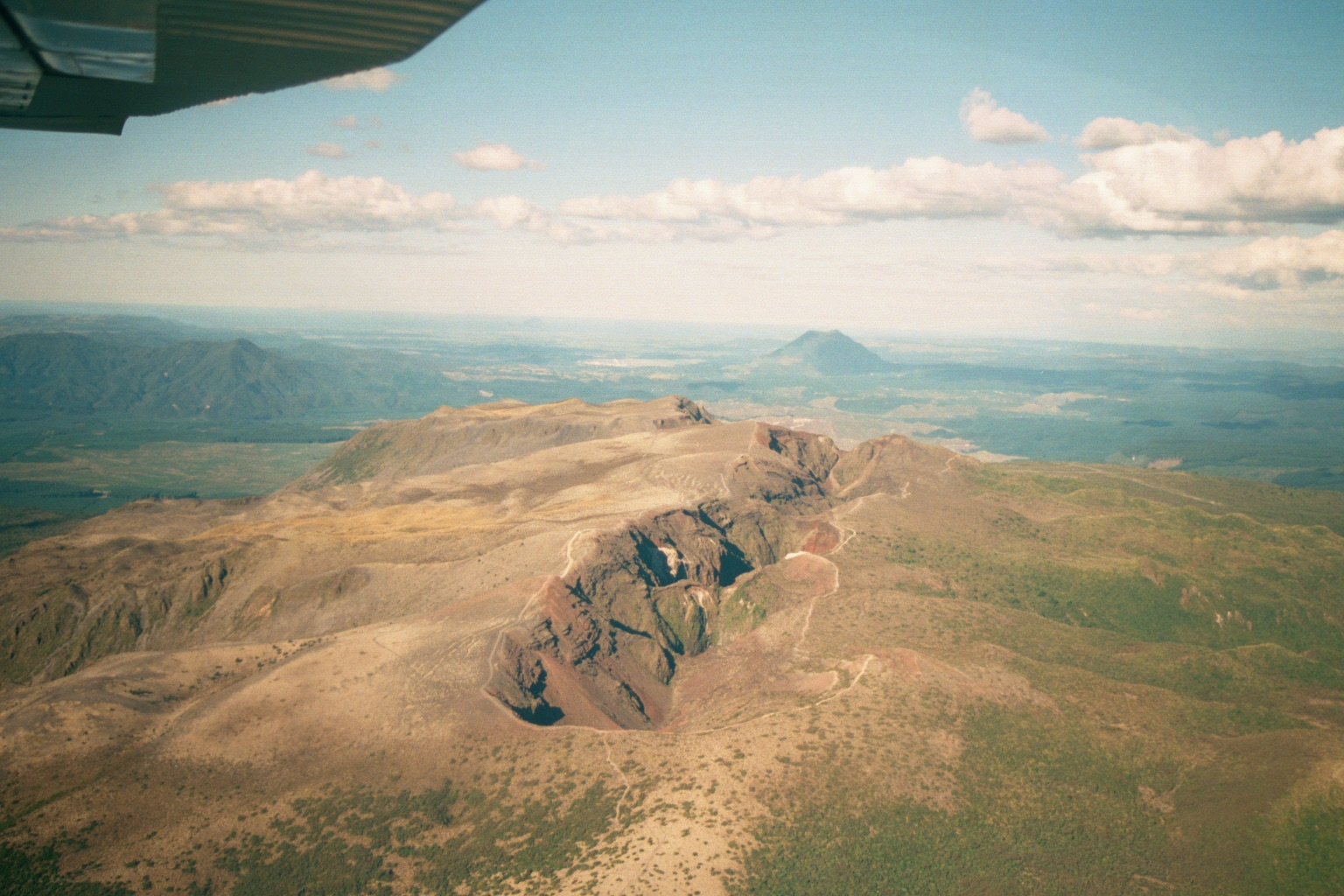
A view over the Mount Tarawera chasm to east with Putauaki (Mount Edgecumbe) and Whakatāne Graben beyond.

The graben extends on shore from the west of the town of Kawerau to the coast at Matatā in the north and Whakatāne in the south. It is drained by the Tarawera River to the north and the Rangitaiki River to the south. The volcano of Putauaki (Mount Edgecumbe) is towards the centre of the on shore portion. The off shore portion extends some 50 km (31 mi) offshore to Whakaari / White Island and is delimited by the undersea Rurima Ridge to the north west and the undersea Motuhora scarp to the south east.

== Geology ==
The graben has formed where the Australian Plate's southwest–northeast trending North Island Fault System is intersected by the northeast-trending Taupō Rift and is on a graywacke basement. It is a site of continuing late Quaternary extension and subsidence, containing dacitic to andestitic volcanoes, and is otherwise filled with oceanic and river sediments as well as rhyolitic volcanics to over 2 km (1.2 mi) in depth. The extremely active normal faulting is orientated within the graben with its defining wall faults and it contains numerous fault zones and faults, with some of significance separated by as little as 100 metres (330 ft). While it could be regarded as a continuation of the Taupō Fault Belt the disruption to faulting by the interposed Ōkataina Caldera essentially makes the graben its own fault zone. The Whakatāne Graben has currently a high rate of tectonic activity and this is in contrast to the off shore Motiti Graben to its northwest beyond the historically volcanic Rurima Ridge which as part of the old Taupō Rift has low current tectonic activity.

=== Volcanics ===
Map centred upon Whakatane Graben as for faults above but showing surface volcanics. Legend: Key for the volcanics that are shown with panning is: basalt (shades of brown/orange); monogenetic basalts; undifferentiated basalts of the Tangihua Complex in Northland Allochthon; arc basalts; arc ring basalts; dacite; andesite (shades of red); basaltic andesite; rhyolite (ignimbrite is lighter shades of violet); plutonic; White shading is selected caldera features.; Clicking on the rectangle icon enables full window and mouse-over with volcano name/wikilink and ages before present.

The extremely active andesitic Whakaari / White Island is situated in the middle of the off shore limits of the Whakatane Graben and the dacite Putauaki (Mount Edgecumbe) which last had a significant eruption about 300 BCE is towards the south east in the on shore section of the graben. Just off shore is Moutohora Island, an andesitic complex volcano that last erupted in the Pleistocene and still has geothermal activity. The main area of land geothermal activity is used for geothermal power at the Kawerau Power Station. The widespread decay earthquakes after the 1987 Edgecumbe earthquake were absent from this area and the nearby Putauaki volcano (see areas of absent yellow shading near Kawerau in seismic activity map at top of page). Nearby caldera volcanism has produced rhyolitic tephra and ignimbrite deposits that are very deep towards the south western end of the graben.

During the period 2005 to 2009 an earthquake swarm occurred that initiated on land near Matatā, but progressed to allow definition of a number of off shore faults in the region just off shore where sediment disturbance had made this difficult (white shading on map on this page). These earthquakes were also associated with an area of land about 400 km^{2} (150 sq mi) in area that has risen by 40 cm (16 in) since the 1950s. The increase of height over this area which is mainly off shore is not thought to be consistent with tectonic origin but would be consistent with inflation from the accumulation of magma at a depth of about 9.5 km (5.9 mi). The best fit modelling suggested the magma source is 19.1 by 24.2 km in size inflating by about 20 mm (0.79 in)/year during the period. Elsewhere off shore in the graben multiple magmatic sills are known to exist between 4 and 15 km depth, beneath the normal faults, and this new magma body was later interpreted as a newly stalled sill like them.

=== Tectonics ===
Subsidence in the center of the graben had commenced before 600,000 years ago and currently is at the rate of up to 2 mm (0.079 in)/year. On both sides of the graben uplift has occurred. To the west Castlecliffian (mid Quaternary) marine sediments have been elevated at a rate of 1 mm (0.039 in)/year to more than 300 m (980 ft) above sea level. To the east in the area interacting with the active faults of the North Island Fault System uplift has been half this for the last 120,000 years. There is no evidence anywhere in the graben of cross faulting from the North Island Fault System so on land the Awakeri Fault and the Edgecombe Fault define clear eastern fault boundaries.

On present land there have been significant earthquake ruptures in the last 800 years in each of the three most active fault zones associated with the graben. These are the Rotoitipakau fault, the Onepu and Edgecumbe faults, and towards the north west the Matata boundary faults. The 1987 Edgecumbe earthquake came after two earthquake swarms, one 40 miles to the north west of the epicentre and one close to the epicentre (white shading on map on this page). The aftershocks after the earthquake were distributed over much of the Whakatāne Graben (yellow shading on map on this page).

Off shore the Rangitaiki fault has been widening at 1.26 ± 0.69 mm/year for 17,500 years and slipping at up to 3.7 mm (0.15 in)/year. This particularly well studied fault commenced as unlinked fault segments about 300,000 years ago and when these segments linked together about 17,500 years ago the average displacement rate of the fault network increased by almost threefold. The off shore boundary faults of the Tarawera fault to the northwest and the White Island Fault to the southeast are active and define the faulting limits of the modern off shore Taupō Rift.

The off shore underlying volcanic sills noted above are consistent with a tectonomagmatic relationship, where magmas supplied by flux melting in the mantle wedge thermally weaken the lithosphere and facilitate rifting.

For more detail on the faults and earthquake swarms in the graben click on the interactive map in the information box at top of page of this article, or refer to the references.
