= Taupō Rift =

Continental rift valley in New Zealand

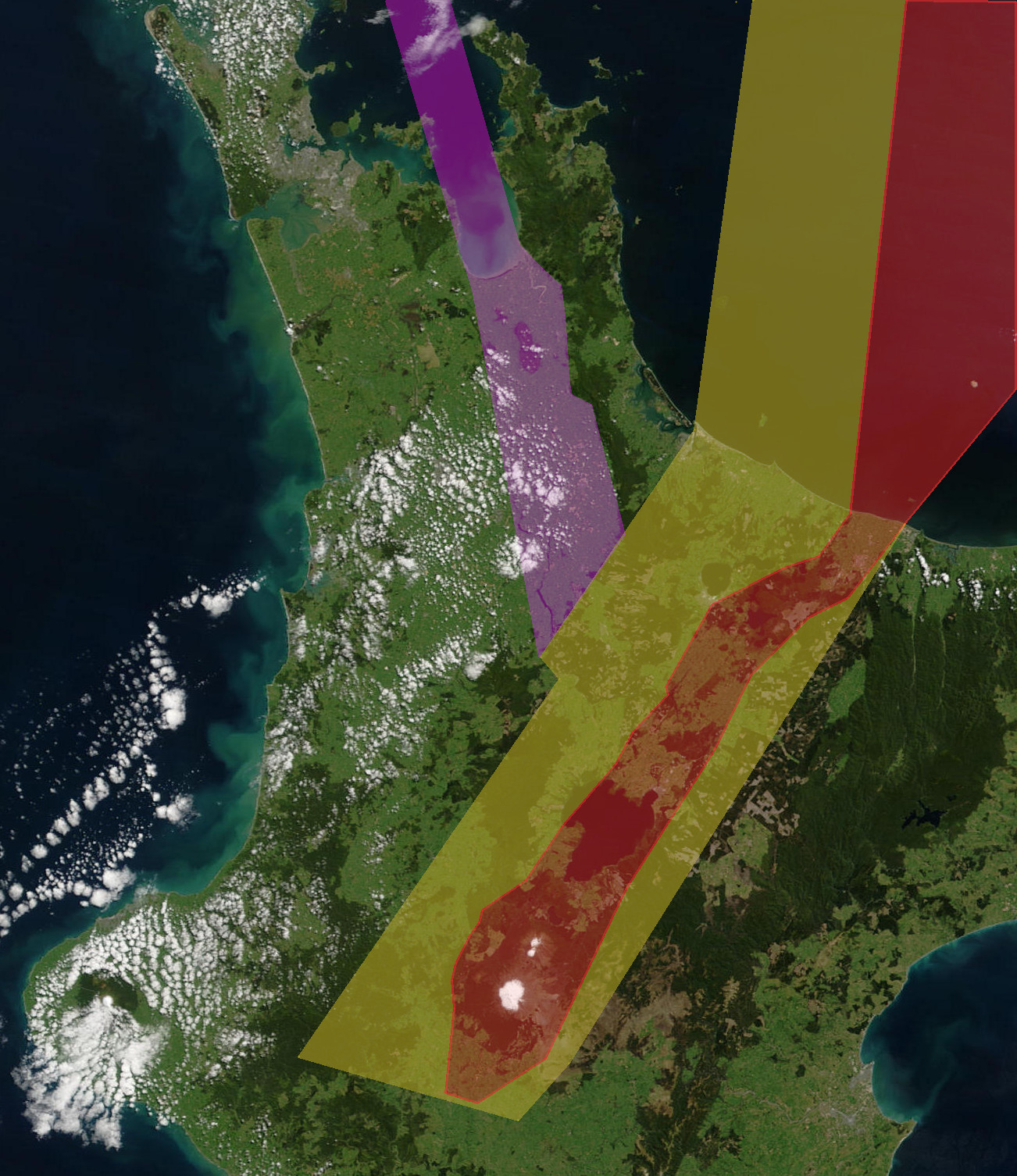
- Intra-arc continental rifts North Island, New Zealand. Red approximately delineates the active modern Taupō Rift, yellow the inactive old Taupō Rift, and purple the still active Hauraki Rift. The rifts intersect in an area where volcanic deposits over 2 million years have buried non active fault systems. There is very complex active normal faulting in the Taupō Rift aligned mainly (apart from at the inland termination of the rift) with the rift alignment.
- A map of active faults (red) in modern Taupo Rift largely defines it.
- Etymology: Lake Taupō
- Coordinates: 38°23′0″S 176°14′0″E (extends 37°30′S to 39°30′S)
- Country: New Zealand
- Region: North Island

Characteristics
- Part of: Hikurangi Margin
- Segments: multiple
- Length: 300 km (190 mi)
- Strike: NE-SW (41°)
- Displacement: 5 mm (0.20 in)/yr at southern inland limit to 19 mm (0.75 in)/yr at East Coast

Tectonics
- Plate: Indo-Australian
- Status: Active
- Earthquakes: Mainly Tectonic
- Type: Intra-arc continental rift
- Movement: Possibly up to 7+ Mw
- Age: Miocene-Holocene
- Volcanic arc/belt: Taupō Volcanic Zone
- New Zealand geology database (includes faults)

The Taupō Rift is the seismically active rift valley containing the Taupō Volcanic Zone, central North Island of New Zealand.

== Geology ==
The Taupō Rift (Taupo Rift) is a 300 km (190 mi) intra-arc continental rift resulting from an oblique convergence in the Hikurangi subduction zone. The present young, modern Taupō Rift is defined by events between 25,000 and 350,000 years and the old Taupō Rift system, which can be defined by a gravity anomaly, is now located more to the north being created between 350,000 and 2 million years and is about 70 kilometres (43 mi) wide. Consensus does not yet exist with regard to the cause of the Taupō Rift's extension or the exceptional volcanic productivity of the associated Taupō Volcanic Zone. Its geology and landforms are of worldwide interest, and it contains multiple significant faults and volcanoes, with some of the volcanoes having potential for worldwide impact.

=== Volcanic context ===
The recent volcanism of the Taupō Volcanic Zone has been divided into three segments, with a central rhyolitic segment, dominated by explosive caldera associated with more typical Island Arc type andesite-dacite stratovolcanoes in either surrounding segment. In the hundreds of faults and their segments, some have associations with volcanism, but most fault activity is tectonic.

=== Tectonic context ===
Fault map centred upon the modern northern Taupō Rift (Whakatāne Graben), which is the most actively widening part, with known active faults in red. Clicking on the map enables mouseover with details the individual faults.

The rift is in that part of the continental Australian Plate associated with the largely underwater Zealandia continental tectonic plate region. The rate of spread of the rift varies from effectively zero, at its southern inland end where the South Wanganui Basin is forming an initial back-arc basin, and volcanic activity has not yet begun, to in the Bay of Plenty as much as 19 mm (0.75 in)/yr. To the north east it is related tectonically to the Havre Trough off the continental shelf which is also an active rift structure. The spread of the rift is associated with the basement graywacke rocks subsiding between the rift walls, so creating grabens infilled with volcanic deposits, sometimes from much higher volcanic mountains than the rift walls. Between 2016 and 2020 there was low volcanic activity in the rift except at Whakaari / White Island, and the areas of maximal satellite measured subsidence were confined to a small areas of about 30 mm (1.2 in)/year near the 2012 Te Māri eruptions site, or the rift geothermal power stations, while from Lake Taupō to the coast subsidence more usually peaked at about 15 mm (0.59 in)/year. The majority of the fault activity is normal faulting. While continental intraarc rifts such as this, and those associated with Mount Aso in Japan, and the Trans-Mexican Volcanic Belt result from a different tectonic process from the more studied intracontinental (intraplate) rifts it has been shown that the Taupō Rift displays all of the three modes of evolution. These are narrowing, lateral migration, and along-strike propagation, as found with intracontinental rifts. The Taupo Rift is widening much faster that other continental intraarc rifts, which might drive this evolution during a relatively short geological timeframe.

Fault map centred upon Ruapehu. Clicking on the map enlarges it, and enables panning and mouseover of fault name/wikilink and display of more individual fault data. Active named Taupō Volcanic Zone faults at the southern extreme of the Taupo Rift are red, unnamed faults are a lighter shade of red.

In the Bay of Plenty region the current active faults of the old Taupō Rift can align with those of the modern Taupō Rift. This was illustrated by the Edgecumbe Fault and the off sea White Island Fault in the Whakatāne Graben of the rift. The parallel Tauranga Fault Zone to the north represents a now mainly inactive old Taupō Rift margin. Further south, where more of the old Taupō Rift faults appear to be inactive, the active and very complex Taupō Fault Belt is orientated north-north-east. This is trending with the modern Taupō Rift alignment, which is not always quite parallel with the old rift alignment. Beyond Lake Taupō to the south, there is a relatively narrow rifting segment in the Tongariro graben which considerably widens at the Ruapehu graben. South of Ruapehu the rift, and its normal faulting, terminates with east to west faulting in the Taupō Rift termination faults. At the scale of the tectonic plate boundary, the rift trends NE-SW (41 ± 2°) but within New Zealand this trend is presently at 30° south of Lake Taupō and is 55° at the Bay of Plenty coast. A significant change in the mean fault strike occurs just south of the Ōkataina Caldera. The normal fault trends range from N20°E in the south to N45°E in the central and northern sectors. There is good evidence that the orientation of intra-arc strike and extension processes has been maintained for 4 million years in this region of New Zealand.

The modern active rift ranges in width from 15 kilometres (9.3 mi) in the northern Bay of Plenty sector, to 40 kilometres (25 mi) beyond Lake Taupō. Significant faults may be separated by as little as 100 metres (330 ft) in the north but in the south increase to up to 10 kilometres (6.2 mi) separation. There are breaks in the intra-rift fault systems in the recently active central rhyolitic caldera segments at the Taupō Volcano and Ōkataina Caldera. In the later case, the strike of the basaltic dyke of the 1886 eruption of Mount Tarawera follows that of faults to the south and north, confirming other hints that orientation of volcanism is preserved.

The modern Taupō Volcanic Zone started forming 61,000 years ago but the modern Taupō Rift appears to only have intra-rift fault activity after the immensely disruptive Oruanui eruption.

== Risks ==
Earthquake activity in the Taupo Rift exhibits the entire spectrum of behaviour ranging from large, ground rupturing events to swarm activity comprising thousands of small events. In the time since Māori settlement these larger earthquakes can be speculated to have resulted in more indirect loss of life than volcanic activity, although as this is driven by oral tradition reports of hundreds dying in a relatively recent landslip on the Waihi Fault Zone south of Lake Taupō it may not be true. Certainly in the context that the Taupō Volcano has been responsible for the largest eruption of the last 30,000 years being the Oruanui eruption, and the more recent smaller 232 ± 10 CE Hatepe eruption but both eruptions occurred before human settlement, the relative risk of earthquakes versus volcanoes depends upon time scale considered.

== See also ==
- Taupō Volcanic Zone
