= Lake Huka =

Historic lake in the North Island of New Zealand

- Approximate maximum Lake Huka sizes between 220,000 years ago (light blue shading) and just before the Oruanui eruption (darker blue shading). The dark blue line delimits the well defined area of the Huka Lake Formation so shaded areas outside this indicates only limited samples. Mouse over is enabled if the map is clicked to enlarge it.
- Location within North Island
- Location: North Island
- Coordinates: 38.62°S 176.1°E
- Lake type: paleolake
- Primary outflows: Waikato
- Basin countries: New Zealand
- First flooded: 220 ka
- Max. length: 100 km (62 mi)
- Max. width: 20 km (12 mi)+

Lake Huka is a former lake whose waters, on its sudden explosive destruction, were a component in the creation of the largest phreatomagmatic eruption characterised to date and the largest volcanic eruption on earth in the past 70,000 years. This was the Oruanui eruption of the Taupō Volcano about 25,500 years ago. Presently the smaller Lake Taupō, currently the largest lake in New Zealand, occupies the area of the southern part of the former lake. Diatoms from sediments erupted from the former lake floor have been identified 850 km (530 mi) away on the Chatham Islands.

== Geography ==
The lake is named after the Huka Falls Formation, the Taupō Volcanic Zone's most widespread sedimentary lacustrine deposit. This is centred around the Huka Falls, in the Taupō Rift. The formation defines Lake Huka, and extends south from the Reporoa Caldera, to beyond the southern end of Lake Taupō with the furtherest south deposits in the drainage area of the Tongariro River. In length this is about 100 km (62 mi) and while the width of the Taupō-Reporoa basin deposits is about 20 km (12 mi), deposits identified onshore of Lake Taupō suggest a maximum width may have been about 30 km (19 mi) to the south. However, as Waiora Formation assigned deposits might contribute to this wider width, the definite lake may not have been this wide.

== Geology ==
The lake formed in a north-east oriented graben of the Taupō Rift that has a Mesozoic basement of greywacke. This basement is known to be in places more than 3 km (1.9 mi) deep presently. The massive Whakamaru ignimbrite eruption of 349,000 years ago, for example has deposits up to 50m thick typically at least 650 m (2,130 ft) below the present ground level. At its northern end in the Taupō-Reporoa Basin the eruptions that had formed the rhyolitic Reporoa Caldera some 280,000 years ago, were to define the lakes boundaries throughout its existence. At the southern end the current andesitic volcanoes commenced about 349,000 years ago as a stratovolcano that became Mount Tongariro. This massif's Tupuna and Haumata formations predate the lake, so that its high ground likely delimited the lake to the south. Volcanic deposits washed down from the Tongariro River drainage were to silt up its southern end as is the case with Lake Taupō today. Kakaramea has been dated to 229 ± 1 ka so may not have been active from the time of lakes formation but may have therefore defined a south-western initial shore. (Note: For discussion of K-Ar verus Ar-Ar age and the former's potential for inaccuracy in low potassium oxide andesite see Pure 2020) In the center and to the west the rhyolitic volcanic deposits associated with the Whakamaru caldera complex and the Taupō Volcano by 222,000 years ago defined the western shore. The lake's high stand remained fairly constant throughout its lifetime and was dictated by the emplacement of the last Waiora Formation eruptives in the north-west of the lake allowing its creation. This took place at 220,000 ± 31,000 BP. The high stand was about 400 m (1,300 ft) above present mean sea level, but given the rate of rift extension (subsidence) and historic much lower sea levels this relative level is almost meaningless to try to define further. Evidence for more than one high stand/lake terrace does exist.

The lake was completely destroyed by the Oruanui eruption of the Taupō Volcano which was the largest phreatomagmatic eruption characterised to date, and occurred about 25,500 years ago. (Note: The age of the Oruanui eruption has been determined by several independent methods and may be subject to further correction. The reference age for the zircon dating used elsewhere in this article of 25.36 ka has been corrected by subsequent work. Other previous ages such as 26.5 ka, have also been updated by IntCal20 correction to 25.675 ± 0.09 ka cal BP. The previous ice core date of 25.318 ± .25 ka BP using the WD2014 timescale was corrected to 25.718 ka. The review article used here as source says around 25,500 years ago which is not a precise statement like the later 2022 corrections. As the 2022 re-calibration of the timing of the Oruanui eruption may not be relevant to zircon dating, zircon dates are not corrected for this.) The reference zircon dating, as used to determine most eruption timings relevant to Lake Huka's evolution, has this, the largest eruption on earth in the past 70,000 years timed at 25,360 ± 160 BP. (Note: Recent ages used in the table have been obtained except for the Oruanui eruption by zircon dating. Age estimations from different original sources used in the table may need correction. For example the lake may have existed for 100,000 years less than previously estimated. This article has corrected estimates published before 2020, to be consistent with the 2020 work and such corrected ages will be marked by this note. It has been assumed in this re-basing that the Waiora Formation pre-dates Lake Huka. No doubt other lakes existed in the area before Lake Huka, and may have been incorporated when it formed.) The Oruanui eruption can not be timed directly by zircon dating and has now been corrected by other means to 25,675 ± 90 years BP.

The Huka Falls Formation was described first in 1965, and is mainly subsurface. It is found between 400–100 m (1,310–330 ft) above present mean sea level in this middle portion of the Taupō Volcanic Zone, and was only accurately dated recently. The Huka Falls Formation is above the mainly volcanic Waiora Formation, some of which is hard to distinguish from the Huka Falls Formation at its margins, and beneath the Oruanui Formation (Wairakei Breccia). (Note: The geological terms used are those of Rosenberg et al. 2020. Because a number of terms have been used to classify the local rock secession the following may help in understanding this article in the context of other articles on Wikipedia. The Taupo Group (Rosenberg et al. 2020) contains the Oruanui Formation as its most recent deposited member but this is slightly different to how the term Oruanui Formation was defined when it replaced the term Wairakei Breccia(Chi & Brown 1991) due to later discoveries. The Taupo Group contains as we go older, the recent Taupo subaerial rhyolite lavas from the Aratiata, Trig 9471 and Rubbish tip domes, then the dacite Tauhara Formation lavas and pyroclastic deposits but there is overlap in time between these and the upper Huka Falls Formation. The oldest part of the Taupo Group that overlaps in time with the lower Huka Falls Formation is the K-Trig Formation. Finally the two Te Mihi and Racetrack rhyolite lavas are subclassified as part of the lower Huka Falls Formation.) The formation is most well characterised in its middle section due to well drilling for geothermal development and here there are three distinct units:

1. Upper with mudstones interbedded with volcaniclastic material
  - in the Waireki area at a depth of 250–263 m (820–863 ft) below ground.
  - between 25,360 ± 160 and 92,000 ± 11,000 years old
2. Middle pumice-rich from a relatively deep-water pyroclastic eruption(s)
  - The eruptions were under a Lake Huka water column that was 150–250 m (490–820 ft) deep
  - Eruptions dated to between 168,000 and 92,000 years ago
3. Lower with mudstones interbedded with volcaniclastic material
  - Is younger than 220,000 ± 31,000 years ago.

During the lake's existence its size, while never small, varied. Because of the length of its existence, relevant processes to such change, being structurally controlled subsidence, subsidence following explosive eruptions or by volcanic eruptions blocking water outflows and silting may have applied. Events that impacted on the lake are shown in the table.

Events impacting on Lake Huka
Date (ka)	Event	Location	Comment
220 to 25.36	Lake Huka's existence	-	
220 ± 31	Emplacement Waiora Formation eruptives	North-west/Outlet	Outlet is Waikato River
198 ± 23	Tihia, andesitic deposits	South	The combined massive where Tihia is a parasite cone would have contributed to making the southern end of the lake shallower.
180 to 123	Pihanga, andesitic deposits	South	Would have contributed to defining the southern end of the lake.
150 to 60	Whakaroa ridge domes	Central	May have contributed to redefining central western part of lake shore.
140 to 45	K-trig basalts	Western Central	New central western shoreline. K-trig commenced this which did not finish until about 45 ka as defined by the Punatekahi cone and its Tihoi Tephra. These deposits have Huka Falls Formation under them and in places over them consistent with higher lake stands and erosion of the volcanics.
142 ± 7	Racetrack, rhyolite lava	Central	Made central portion lake shallower by about 0.5 m (1 ft 8 in).
141 ± 8	Te Mihi 2, rhyolite lava	Central	Made central portion lake shallower by about 35 m (115 ft).
122 ± 9	Te Mihi 1, rhyolite lava	Central	Made central portion lake shallower by about 155 m (509 ft).
168 ± 24 to 92 ± 11	Middle Huka Falls Formation Eruption	Central	Made central portion lake shallower.
200-26	Tongariro volcanic centre	South	Volcanic sediments from multiple eruptions were washed down into the southern lake and the southern shore line retreated to the north.
~100	Illdefined Taupo Eruptions	South	Evidence of most of these was destroyed in the Oruanui eruption. The south east andesitic-basalt of the Karangahape Cliffs on the west side of Lake Taupō and observation that the Oruanui ignimbrite to the east of the lake comprises up to 50% andesitic lithology suggests that an andesitic cone of cubic kilometre-scale was destroyed during the Oruanui eruption
81.3 to 77.2	Motuoapa Peninsula, rhyolite	South	Two rhyolitic eruptions that changed south-western shoreline
58 ± 10	Emplacement Tauhara dacite	Eastern central	Created smaller new shore line eastern central region
34.5 ± 3.1	Motuoapa Peninsula, dacite	South	Possibly only local impact south-western shoreline
28.621 ± 1.428	Okaia	Central	This eruption's tephra deposits contained a diatom population distribution consistent with that of the later Oruanui eruption.
27	Trig 9471 and the Rubbish Tip Domes Emplacement	Central	Narrowed at least, if not blocked the shoreline in central region cutting Lake Huka in half about 27,000 years ago. These events included the phreatoplinian Poihipi eruption from Rubbish Tip Dome.
25.36 ± 0.16	Oruanui eruption	South	Destroyed lake

=== Destruction ===
The Oruanui eruption occurred in a ten-stage process with the main vents located under the southern Lake Huka system. There is a fair possibility on geological grounds that the southern section of Lake Huka, had recently separated from the northern section to create what could be called the first Lake Taupō, due to either or both of pre-eruption upwarping shortly before the eruption itself, or in a process that likely commenced about a thousand years earlier, due to eruptive activity of the Poihipi volcano adjoining Mount Tauhara whose magma chamber is under Wairakei and that had erupted at Trig 9471 and the Rubbish Tip Domes about 27,000 years ago.

=== Outflow ===
Outflow of Lake Huka was always via the Waikato River, but had major downstream implications to the evolving geology of the Hamilton Basin as now found in the Waikato Basin, and Hauraki Rift as now found in the Hauraki Plains. The predominant pattern was an ancestral Waikato River that drained the Taupo Rift through the Ōngāroto Gorge and reached the Pacific Ocean to the north at the Hauraki Gulf via the Hauraki Plains. By the time of the Oruanui eruption the lower reaches of the Waikato River were a mature river system. It is unknown if the evidence for some historic drainage well before the Oruanui eruption, into the Hamilton Basin by the Waikato River relates to a period when Lake Huka existed. Whatever the destruction of Lake Huka was associated ultimately by the breakdown of a volcanic dam located over the central portion of the former Lake Huka and then a change in the Waikato River course so that it now flowed through the Waikato Basin, into the Tasman Sea. This change was not immediate and only occurred permanently sometime after the eruption.

=== Later lakes ===
Lake Taupō was formed and filled over a period of about a hundred years after the Oruanui eruption. In the former northern region of Lake Huka there is evidence for a temporary lake in the Reporoa Basin with a shoreline terrace at about 360 m (1,180 ft) and lake deposits at up to 400 m (1,300 ft) above today's sea level but this was either drained before the main break-out flood from Lake Taupō, or was destroyed during the break-out flood. Much later, after the 232 CE Hatepe eruption two temporary Lake Reporoas were created transiently in the Reporoa Basin.

== Ecology ==
Intact samples of erupted lake sediment from the Oruanui eruption in the form of lithic clasts in the ignimbrite contain diatoms. In particular Cyclostephanos novaezelandiae is found which is much rarer in the current volcanic lakes of the region, and this is believed to be because a Cyclostephanos novaezelandiae ecosystem became less likely due to reorganisation of the watershed in the aftermath of the eruption, and climate warming following the Last Glacial Maximum. Further as Cyclostephanos novaezeelandiae, is endemic to New Zealand's North Island it would serve if identified in tephra to confirm the eruptive source region. Diatoms have been identified in tephra from the eruption 850 km (530 mi) away on the Chatham Islands.

The earlier Taupō Volcano Okaia eruption, that erupted through Lake Huka, also dispersed diatom specimens from lake sediments, with a very similar ecological population to the Oruanui eruption.
