= Kakaramea-Tihia Massif =

Volcano in New Zealand

- Location within North Island
- Map of nearby approximate surface volcanic deposits to the Kakaramea-Tihia Massif. The red makers indicate the Kakaramea and Tihia peaks respectively. Lake Rotoaira is to the south and beyond it is Tongariro with its recent vents active in the last 15,000 years shaded orange-yellow, with craters in yellow outline. Lakes in vents are outlined in blue. To the south east across the Te Ponanga Saddle are the deposits of Pihanga. The Taupō Volcano underneath Lake Taupō is to the north east. Legend: Key for the volcanics that are shown with panning is: basalt (shades of brown/orange); monogenetic basalts; undifferentiated basalts of the Tangihua Complex in Northland Allochthon; arc basalts; arc ring basalts; dacite; andesite (shades of red); basaltic andesite; rhyolite (ignimbrite is lighter shades of violet); plutonic; White shading is selected caldera features.; Clicking on the rectangle icon enables full window and mouse-over with volcano name/wikilink and ages before present. Kakaramea-Tihia Massif's location in the North Island

Highest point
- Elevation: 1,300 m (4,300 ft)
- Coordinates: 38°59′20″S 175°42′30″E

Geography
- Location: Taupō Volcanic Zone, New Zealand

Geology
- Mountain type: Stratovolcano
- Last eruption: at least 20,000 years ago

Climbing
- Easiest route: Mt Tihia Track

The Kakaramea-Tihia Massif is an andesitic volcano in the central North Island of New Zealand. It extends from the peak of Kakaramea at 1,300 metres (4,300 ft) in the west to the peak of Tinui at 1,169 metres (3,835 ft). The term Kakaramea means many colours in Māori and relates to rock/soil colour on parts of the massif so is a common place name in New Zealand. The massif is located in the North Island Volcanic Plateau, to the south of Lake Taupō. Lake Rotoaira lies to the south-east as does further away Mount Tongariro and to the east is Pihanga on the other side of the Te Ponanga Saddle from Tihia.

== Geology ==
Eruptions from the Kakaramea-Tihia Massif commenced at 229,000 ± 1,000 years ago. A more recent dated eruption was from Tihia, at 198,000 ± 23,000 years ago, with even more recent activity possible to Tihia's south-west. The older formations are from vents aligned north-west to south-east, but the more recent eruptions are consistent with the north-north-east to south-south-west alignment of the present southern Taupō Volcanic Zone rifting. The Kakaramea-Tihia Massif is adjacent to the Waihi Fault Zone which lies almost directly under Kakaramea. Eruptives from it define part of the shore line of Lake Taupō so would have defined part of the shore line of Lake Huka that preceded Lake Taupō given that the mountain first formed before Lake Huka.

== Biology ==
It is one of the habitats where Dactylanthus taylorii a very rare endangered fully parasitic flowering plant is found. This is pollinated by the endangered New Zealand lesser short-tailed bat.

== The Keepers of the Wai ==
In Māori custom, the area became the responsibility of the Matapuna people (a mix of Tuwharetoa, Tama Kopiri/Upper Whanganui whanau/Tu Hope - Descendants of Te Rere Ao, the First of Tuwharetoa) of the Tuwharetoa people, who have traditionally been the keepers of the wai (Keepers of the Water) and Maunga Kaitiaki (Protectors of the Mountain).

== See also ==
- List of volcanoes in New Zealand
