= Oruanui eruption =

World's most recent supereruption, of Taupō Volcano, New Zealand

- Volcano: Taupō Volcano
- Date: c. 25,700 years BP
- Type: Ultra-Plinian
- Location: North Island, New Zealand; 38°48′S 175°54′E
- Volume: 1,170 km^{3} (280 cu mi)
- VEI: 8
- Impact: Devastated much of North Island with detectable ash fall 5,000 km (3,100 mi) away

Maps
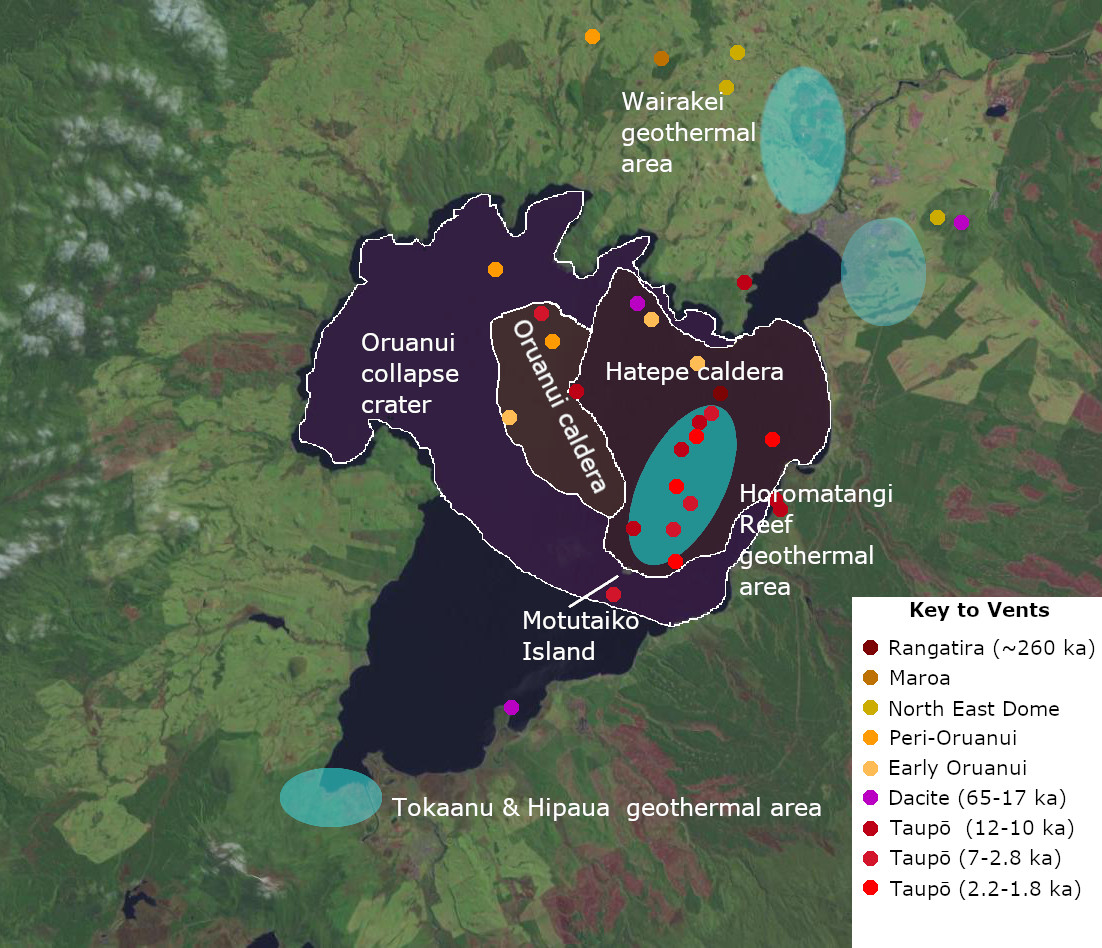
- Recent vents and caldera structures Taupō Volcano. Present active geothermal systems are in light blue. A key to the vents is in the diagram.

The Oruanui eruption (also known as the Kawakawa eruption or Kawakawa/Oruanui event) of Taupō Volcano in New Zealand around 25,700 years before present was the world's most recent supereruption, and its largest phreatomagmatic eruption characterised to date.

== Geography ==
At the time of the eruption, the sea level was much lower than at present, and for over 100,000 years the Taupō Volcano had been mainly under Lake Huka, a larger lake than the present Lake Taupō. Lake Huka was destroyed in the eruption, and other features of the local geography were changed significantly as outlined below.

== Eruption ==
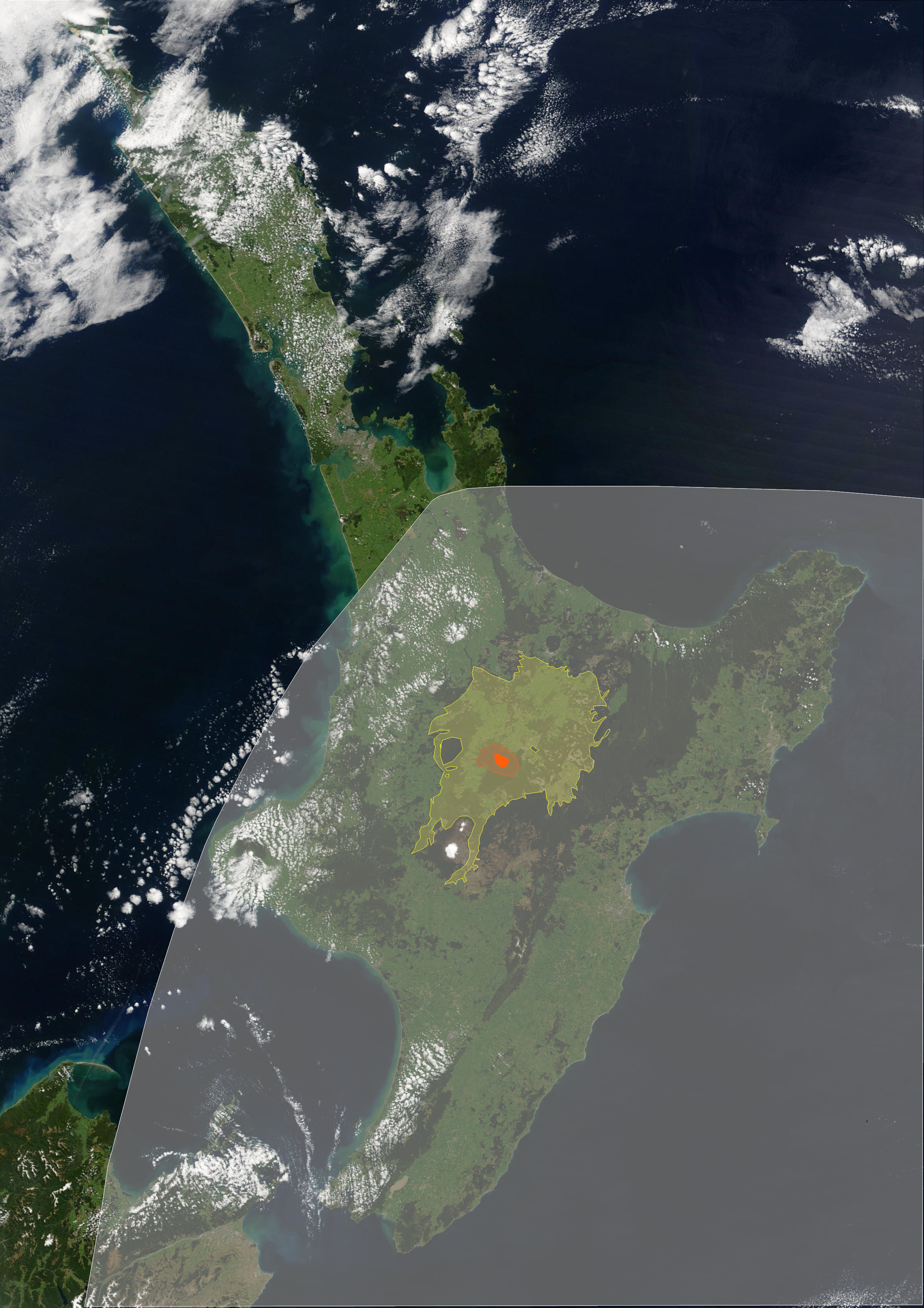
Oruanui eruption impact North Island in terms of approximate 10cm ash deposit (white shading) and approximate ignimbrite from pyroclastic flow (yellow shading). The central red area is the Oruanui caldera with surrounding collapse crater in lighter red. It is superimposed on present day New Zealand although at the time New Zealand's land mass was larger, as sea level was much lower.

With a Volcanic Explosivity Index of 8, it is one of the largest eruptions ever to occur in New Zealand, and the most recent supereruption on the planet. It occurred 25,675±90 years BP (Note: The age given here is the most recent identified in a number of review articles, and may be subject to further correction. A previous age of 26.5 ka, was updated in 2020 by IntCal20 correction to 25,675 ± 0.09 ka BP. In 2022, the ice core date of 25.318 ± .25 ka BP using the WD2014 timescale was corrected to 25.718 ka.) in the Late Pleistocene. It generated approximately 430 km^{3} (100 cu mi) of pyroclastic fall deposits, 320 km^{3} (77 cu mi) of pyroclastic density current (PDC) deposits (mostly ignimbrite), and 420 km^{3} (100 cu mi) of primary intracaldera material, equivalent to 530 km^{3} (130 cu mi) of rhyolitic magma, totalling 1,170 km^{3} (280 cu mi) of total deposits. As such it is the largest phreatomagmatic eruption characterised to date. The eruption is divided into 10 different phases on the basis of nine mappable fall units and a tenth, poorly preserved but volumetrically dominant fall unit.

Modern-day Lake Taupō, 616 km^{2} (238 sq mi) in area and 186 m (610 ft) deep, partly fills the caldera generated during this eruption. A 140 km^{2} (54 sq mi) structural collapse is concealed beneath Lake Taupō, while the lake outline at least partly reflects volcano-tectonic collapse. Early eruption phases saw shifting vent positions; development of the caldera to its maximum extent (indicated by lithic lag breccias) occurred during phase 10.

=== Unusual features ===
The Oruanui eruption shows many unusual features: its episodic nature, a wide range of magma–water interaction, and complex interplay of pyroclastic fall and flow deposits. The erupted magma was very uniform in composition and this composition has not been seen since, but had been seen before the eruption. Detailed compositional analysis has revealed the early phases of the eruption had a small amount of magma from outside the Taupō Volcano and are most consistent with a tectonic trigger. The eruption occurred through a lake system which was either the southern section of Lake Huka, recently separated by pre-eruption upwarping shortly before the eruption itself, or some have suggested Lake Taupō had separated with a higher level than the remaining Lake Huka about a thousand years earlier, due solely to eruptive activity of the Poihipi volcano adjoining Mount Tauhara whose magma chamber is under Wairakei and that had erupted at Trig 9471 and the Rubbish Tip Domes about 27,000 years ago, filling that portion of Lake Huka. Accordingly, many of the deposits contain volcanic ash aggregates.

=== Eruption process ===
The timescale for the growth of the assumed Oruanui mush zone, which has a distinctive chemical and isotopic composition and zircon model-age spectra, is now known to be from about 40,000 years ago from earlier Taupō Volcano eruptions. During crystal-liquid separation in this mush, large volumes of melt and crystals were carried upwards into a melt-dominant magma body that formed at 3.5–6 km (2.2–3.7 mi) depth. There is emerging evidence that much of the silicic magma produced was formed deeper than this in the middle or lower crust (some have suggested as deep as the upper mantle) and ascending rapidly to this magma reservoir with only brief storage there. The relative uniformity of the eruptives (99% high-SiO_{2} rhyolite), suggests the Oruanui magma body had been vigorously convecting by the time of the eruption. Nonetheless composition analysis shows that three different rhyolites contributed, with the initial two phases of the eruption having contributions from a leak of biotite-bearing rhyolite, presumably along dykes at more than 2 km (1.2 mi) depth, associated with tectonic faulting from a magma chamber to the north. The biotite-bearing rhyolite composition is like that found within the Maroa Caldera adjacent to the Taupō Volcano.

These initial stages were from magma at relatively low overpressure and if stored and matured in a shallow magma chamber had a temperature of about 780 ± 20 °C, with between a week to two weeks ascent of magma before eruption. It is possible that if the later majority of the magma formed deeper, the maturing temperature was about 900 °C. About 0.5% of the eruptives was low-SiO_{2} rhyolite believed to have been tapped from isolated pockets in the underlying crystal mush. Two distinct mafic magmas were involved in the eruption, and a total volume of 3–5 km^{3} (0.72–1.20 cu mi) of mafic magma is atypically high compared to other nearby rhyolitic eruptions.

The timescales involved in the final eruption priming appear to be only decades long at most. The eruption itself lasted only a few months, with most of the stages as described below being continuous. The location of the eruptive vents are only known for the first four stages of the eruption. Vents during stage 1 and 2 were in the north-east portion of present Lake Taupō, a third vent (or more likely several vents) was closer to the eastern alignment of the later Hatepe eruption, and the 4th vent was more central. The later stages of the eruption may have had venting from much of what is now the northern part of Lake Taupō.

While pyroclastic density currents were generated throughout the eruption, the peak distance reached in ignimbrite deposits was about 90 km (56 mi) during phase 8. This phase, as well as several others, before phase 10, were not that much smaller than the later Hatepe eruption of the Taupō Volcano. Ash (Kawakawa tephra) distributed during the various stages created a stratigraphic layer found over much of New Zealand and its surrounding seabed as wind direction varied.

Eruption timetable pre-eruption syn-eruption biotite-bearing in high-SiO_{2} rhyolite 99% high-SiO_{2} rhyolite.
| Approximate start time process relative to eruption (years) (Note: The use of years in this way in this table is because it is sortable. One day is 0.003 of a year so the eruption has arbitrarily been given a length just less than 3 months when it might have lasted from start to finish twice this. Many of the eruption stages were continuous and lasted just hours. The syn-eruption processes happened all together.) | Geological stage | Eruption stage | Geological event | Eruption relevance | Tephra volume< (Note: These are not dense-rock equivalent (DRE) which is more standardised way of expressing the size of an eruption.) (km^{3}) | Ignimbrite volume< (km^{3}) |
|---|---|---|---|---|---|---|
| 10000 | 1 | – | Assimilation into melt of Cretaceous to Jurassic basement greywacke and Quaternary igneous rocks | magma reservoir size and composition | – | – |
| 10000 | 2 | – | Mush crystallisation and development of interstitial melt | magma reservoir development and composition | – | – |
| 3000 | 3 | – | Melt-dominant magma body predominates | enables potential for eruption | – | – |
| 100 | 4 | – | Crystallisation of rim zones in melt-dominant body | allows timing of cooling | – | – |
| 100 | 5 | – | Recrystallisation of dissolved orthopyroxene | allows timing | – | – |
| 100 | 6 | – | Crystal growth in isolated low-SiO2 rhyolite pockets | immature but tapped in eruption | – | – |
| 10 | 7 | – | Mafic magma interacting with mush | a potential primer event but did not cause the overpressure seen in other super eruptions | – | – |
| 0.01 | 8 | – | Mafic magma infiltration into high-SiO_{2} rhyolite | process just prior to and during eruption | – | – |
| 0.01 | 10 (Note: The numbering of Fig. 15 of Allen et al for geological processes is perhaps not logical given likely time of initiation. This is one reason the table has been made sortable.) | – | Lateral, tectonically associated feeding in from north biotite-bearing rhyolite | The early phase 1 and 2 of the eruption were separated by several months, and this compositional signal is suggestive of a tectonic trigger. | – | – |
| 0.01 | 11 | – | Ascent, decompression and fragmentation of magma | Early melt average ascent was about 5 days, these processes are relevant to composition signals and the violence of the eruption, independent of it being under a lake | – | – |
| 0.001 | 9 | – | injection of low-SiO_{2} rhyolite into high-SiO_{2} rhyolite | late process during eruption | – | – |
| 0 | – | 1 | – | Single pumice fall, accompanied by wet low-velocity pyroclastics to northwest of vent | 0.8 | 0.01 |
| −0.215 | – | 2 | – | pumice and fine ash in 3 phases | 0·8 | 0.1 |
| −0.2151 | – | 3 | – | Wet with nearby pyroclastic and fall deposits, and distal multiple-bedded fall material postulated after mafic magma recharge | >5 | 10 |
| −0.2152 | – | 4 | – | Single pumice fall with thin but widespread pyroclastic deposit | 2.5 | 0.1 |
| −0.22 | – | 5 | – | Pumice fall with local pyroclastic deposit | 14 | 1 |
| −0.225 | – | 6 | – | Mixed dry and wet fall with widespread multiple pyroclastic deposits | 5.5 | 10 |
| −0.23 | – | 7 | – | Single pumice fall with widespread, voluminous pyroclastic deposit after mafic magma recharge of about 18 hours | 15 | 10 |
| −0.231 | – | 8 | – | Wet fall deposit, with widespread, voluminous pyroclastic deposit with accretionary lapilli postulated after mafic magma recharge | 37 | 10 |
| −0.232 | – | 9 | – | Single ash and pumice fall bed, with mainly proximal, voluminous pyroclastic deposits | 85 | 10 |
| −0.24 | – | 10 | – | Fine-grained ash, with voluminous pyroclastic deposit in the Lake Taupo basin | 265 | 100 |

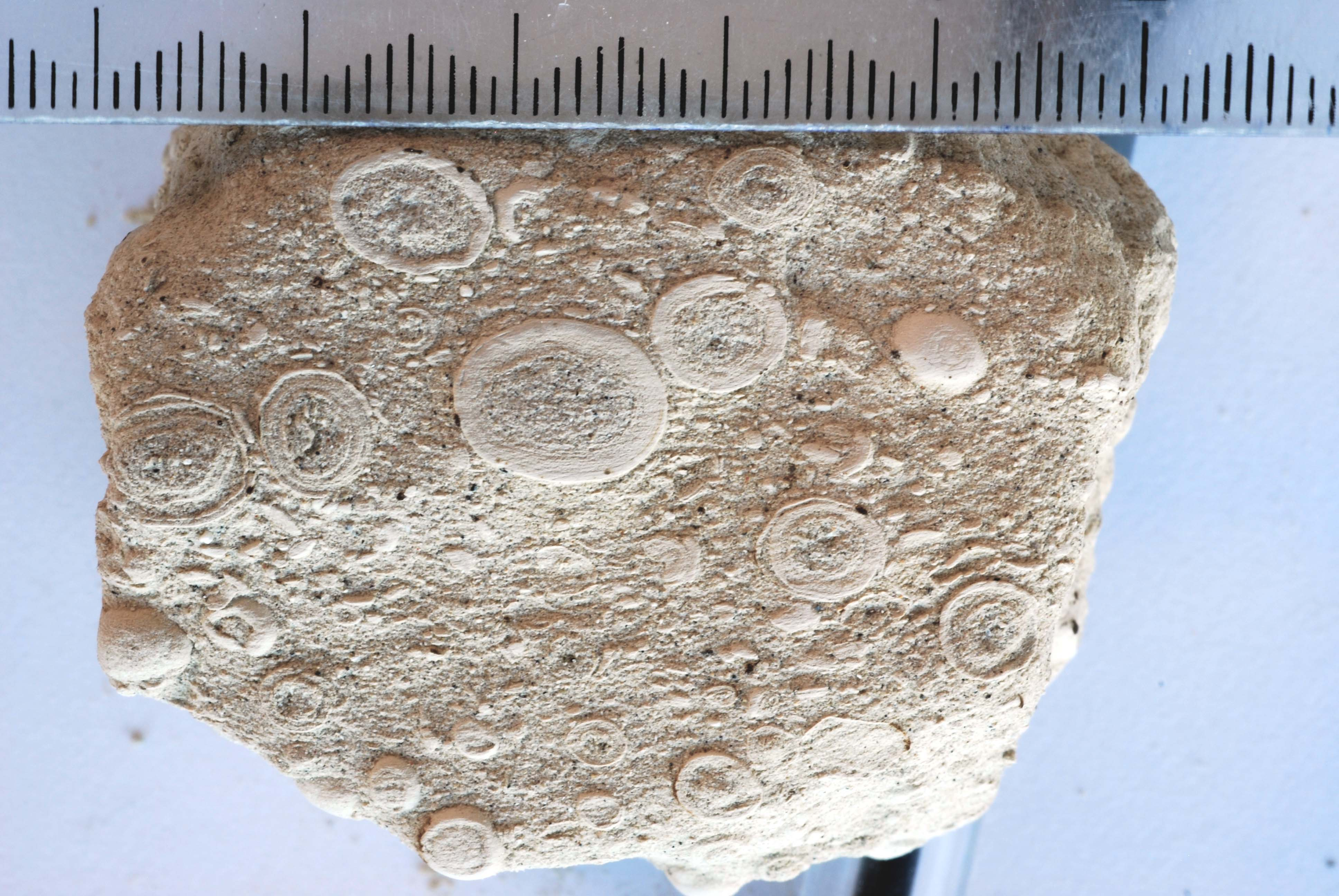
Tephra from the Oruanui eruption, containing spherical accretionary lapilli as in phase 8

== Impact ==
=== Local ===
Approximate maximum lake size at 22,500 years ago after the Oruanui eruption (dark blue shading). This is before the volcanic material dam near the present lake outlet failed, and has the lake flowing via its old Waihora outlet into the Mangakino Stream and on to the Waikato River.

Tephra from the eruption covered much of the central North Island and is termed Kawakawa-Oruanui tephra, or KOT. The Oruanui ignimbrite is up to 200 metres (660 ft) deep. Ashfall affected most of New Zealand, with an ash layer as thick as 18 centimetres (7 in) deposited on the Chatham Islands, 850 km (530 mi) away. The local biological impact must have been immense as 10 centimetres (4 in) of ash was deposited from just south of Auckland over the whole of the rest of the North Island, and the top of the South Island, both of which were larger in land area as sea levels were considerably lower than present. The pyroclastic ignimbrite flows destroyed all vegetation they reached.

Later erosion and sedimentation had long-lasting effects on the landscape and may have caused the Waikato River to shift from the Hauraki Plains to its current course through the Waikato to the Tasman Sea. Less than 22,500 years ago, Lake Taupō, having filled to about 75 m (246 ft) above its current level, and draining initially via a Waihora outlet to the northwest, cut through its Oruanui ignimbrite dam near the present Taupō outlet to the northeast at a rate which left no terraces around the lake. About 60 km^{3} (14 cu mi) of water was released, leaving boulders of up to 10 m (33 ft) at least as far down the Waikato River as Mangakino. The impact has been summarised as:

1. A new landscape with ignimbrite up to hundreds of metres thick that ponded in valleys around the volcano. The actual area of the ignimbrite is less than the subsequent, smaller Hatepe eruption presumably because the later generated a more intense pyroclastic flow but much less accumulative tephra fall.
2. The volume created by the caldera collapse acted both as a sedimentation sink for the local catchment and as the basin in which a new Lake Taupō accumulated.
3. The former Lake Huka that had extended to the north and partially occupied the older Reporoa Caldera was destroyed and filled in with ignimbrite, which also created a temporary barrier between the Taupō and Reporoa watersheds that had to be eroded before a stable drainage of the new Lake Taupō was established.
4. Destruction of vegetation over most of the central North Island.
5. Remobilisation of the pyroclastic material as alluvium with rainfall changed the drainage pattern of the Waikato River. The large amount of material mobilised particularly impacted the Waikato Plains and Hauraki Plains.

=== Distal ===
The Oruanui eruption ash deposits from the final (tenth) phase have been geochemically matched to Western Antarctic ice core deposits 5,000 km (3,100 mi) away and they provide a convenient marker for the last glacial maximum in Antarctica. This ash cloud has been modelled to have taken about two weeks to encircle the Southern Hemisphere. Diatoms from erupted lake sediments have been found in the volcanic ash deposits about 850 km (530 mi) downwind on the Chatham Islands.

== Afterwards ==
The first characterised eruption from the Taupō Volcano after the Oruanui eruption took place about 5000 years later. The first three eruptions were dacitic as was the Puketarata eruption. The other twenty-four rhyolitic events until the present, including the major Hatepe eruption, dated to around 232 AD, came from three distinct magma sources. These have had geographically focused vent locations, and a wide range of eruption volumes, with nine explosive events producing tephra deposits.

== See also ==
- North Island Volcanic Plateau
- Taupō volcano
- Hatepe eruption (The most recent major eruption of the Taupō volcano)
