= Waihi Fault Zone =

Fault zone in New Zealand

Coordinates: 39.061°S 175.634°E

Waihi fault zone
- Waihi North fault, Waihi South fault
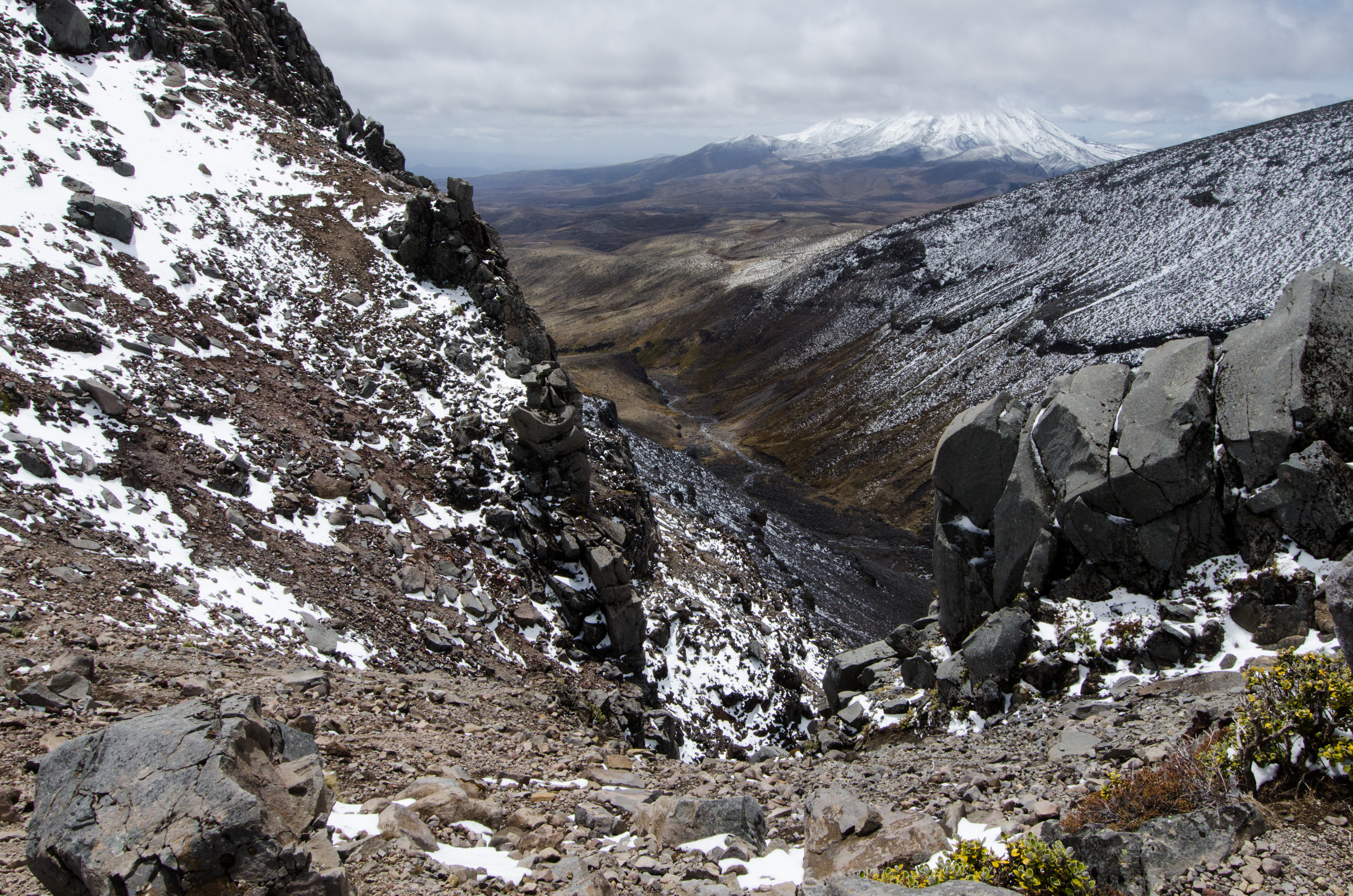
- View from the southern end of Waihi Fault Zone north. A strike of the Waihi-South fault commences across the valley in the foreground and the fault zone extends past the western slopes of the Mount Tongariro massive in distance. The top of the cone of Mount Ngauruhoe is hidden by cloud but is to the east of the fault zone, as are the snow covered areas of Mount Tongariro behind it.
- Known active Waihi Fault Zone surface traces. For map of other nearby active faults see Taupō Rift.
- Etymology: Waihi Village
- Country: New Zealand
- Region: Waikato Region

Characteristics
- Range: Up to 7.2 Mw
- Segments: 2
- Length: 38 km (24 mi)
- Strike: N-S
- Displacement: 2.6 mm (0.10 in)/yr±0.8 mm (0.031 in)/yr

Tectonics
- Plate: Indo-Australian
- Status: Active
- Type: Normal fault
- Age: Miocene-Holocene
- Volcanic arc/belt: Taupō Volcanic Zone
- New Zealand geology database (includes faults)

The Waihi Fault Zone is a seismically active area of the central North Island of New Zealand whose earthquakes have been associated with significant loss of life.

== Geology ==
The intra-rift Waihi Fault Zone extends at least 38 kilometres (24 mi) from Little Waihi at Lake Taupō towards Mount Ruapehu on the west side of the mountain. It has two segments known as the Waihi North fault and the Waihi South fault and at least 19 fault strands (three of which were previously known as the Taurewa Fault). Together they make up the south western intra-rift faults of the Tongariro Graben in the Taupō Rift. The northern part of the Waihi South fault which is about 18 kilometres (11 mi) long is just to the west of the recently active vents of Mount Tongariro so there is the potential for both active faulting and magmatic processes to trigger earthquakes. Some northern fault strands also pass through the presumed extinct Kakaramea-Tihia Massif volcano, although this is still associated with geothermal activity at the Hipaua Steaming Cliffs. The fault zone has the potential to be associated with up to 7.2 magnitude earthquakes with recurrence intervals of mean 6.6 magnitude earthquakes between every 490 and 1380 years. There is now good evidence from LiDAR that it extends to the north in a three fault complex another 14 kilometres (8.7 mi) on land or even beyond the shore line of Lake Taupo. The nearby intra-rift Poutu fault zone to the east, by about 10 kilometres (6.2 mi), is parallel to the Waihi fault. The active Taurewa and Rotopounamu faults that have been separately named by some are now assigned to the two fault zones. To the west of the Waihi Fault Zone the National Park Fault is the current western wall fault for the modern Taupo rift.

== Risks ==
Large landslides have occurred in the Hipaua Steaming Cliffs area of the Waihi fault escarpment and it is likely that some the large historical loss of life by New Zealand standards from these landslides has been related to earthquake activity on the fault.
