= Lake Rotopounamu =

Lake in the North Island of New Zealand

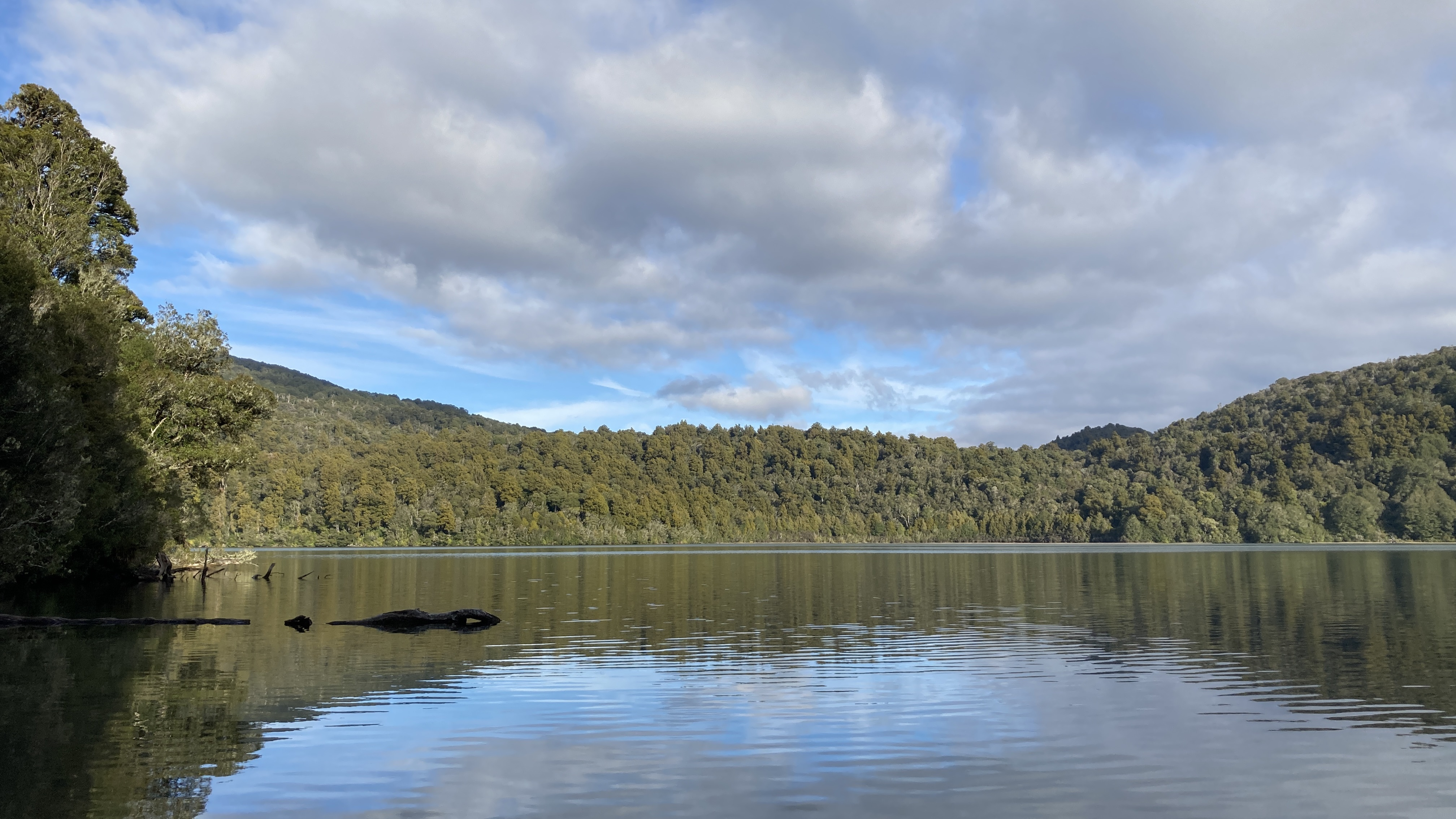
- Lake Rotopounamu

- Location within North Island
- Location: Tongariro National Park, North Island
- Coordinates: 39.0267°S 175.7382°E
- Type: landslide formation
- Primary inflows: seven streams
- Primary outflows: Nothing visible but has a gurgler (drain)
- Basin countries: New Zealand
- Max. length: 1,265 m (4,150 ft)
- Max. width: 1,025 m (3,363 ft)
- Surface area: 1 km^{2} (0.39 mi^{2})
- Max. depth: 9 m (30 ft)

Lake Rotopounamu (also known as Greenstone Lake, from the Māori roto (lake) and pounamu (greenstone)) is a secluded lake in the Pihanga Scenic Reserve, in the Tongariro National Park in New Zealand's Central North Island. It lies at the northwest foot of Mt Pihanga, and was formed by a landslide around 10,000 years ago. The lake is fed by seven streams, but has no visible surface outflow. It is believed to drain underground.

== Recreation ==
Around the lake is a scenic 5-kilometre (3 mi) loop track, which can be accessed from the Pihanga Saddle road (State Highway 47) between Tūrangi and Tongariro. Walking this track takes about two hours.

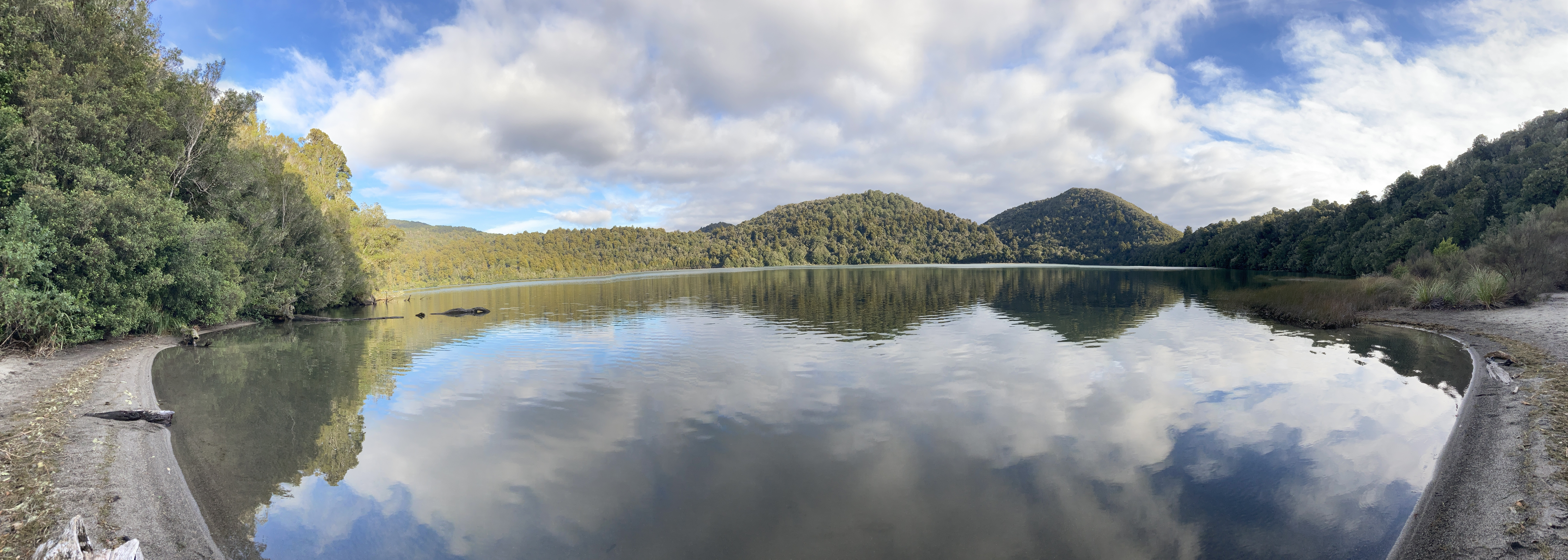
Panorama of Lake Rotopounamu from Ten Minute Beach
