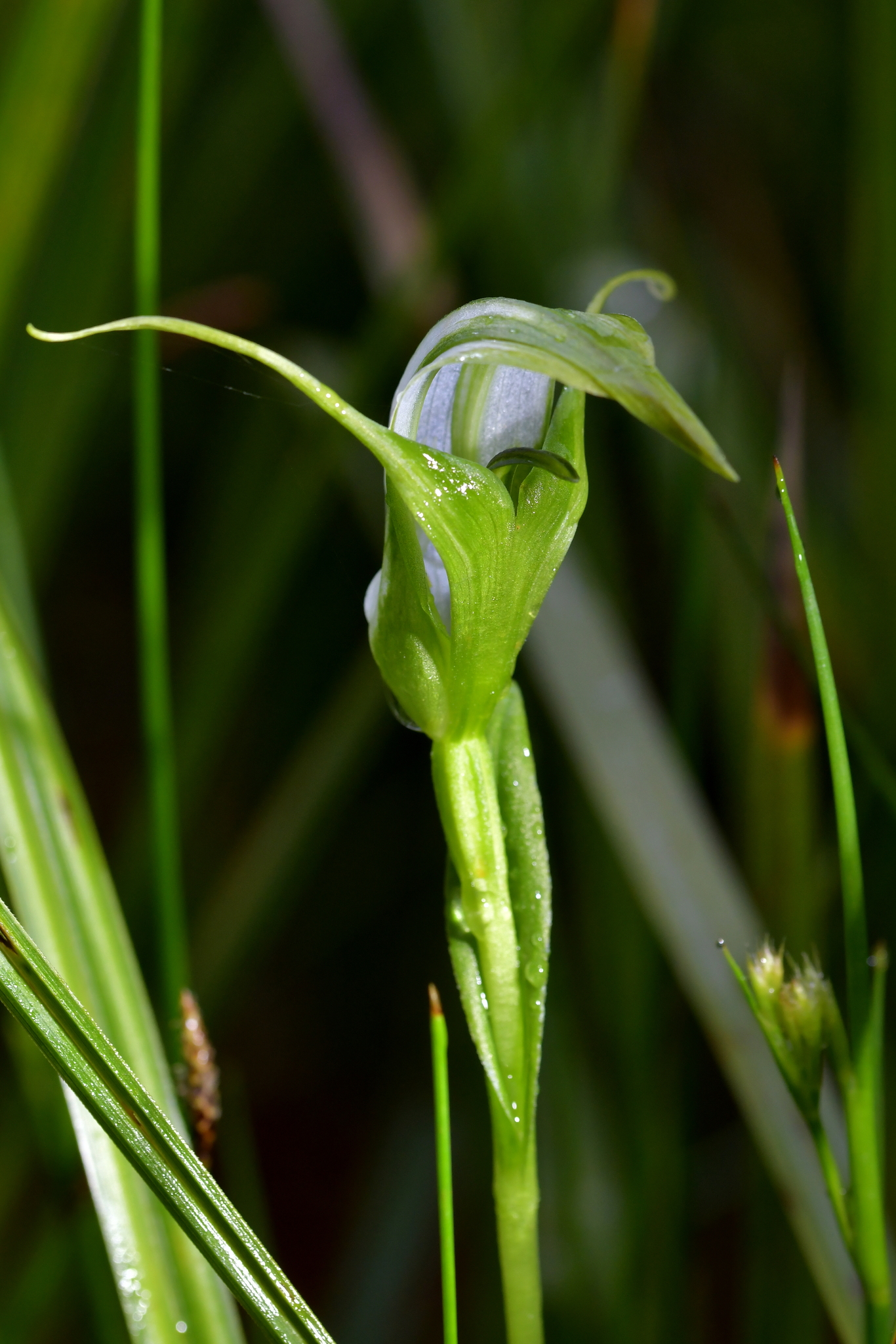

Conservation status
- Nationally Critical (NZ TCS)

Scientific classification
- Kingdom: Plantae
- Clade: Tracheophytes
- Clade: Angiosperms
- Clade: Monocots
- Order: Asparagales
- Family: Orchidaceae
- Subfamily: Orchidoideae
- Tribe: Cranichideae
- Genus: Pterostylis
- Species: P. micromega

Binomial name
- Pterostylis micromega Hook.f.

Synonyms
- Pterostylis furcata var. micromega (Hook.f.) Hatch; Pterostylis polyphylla Colenso

= Pterostylis micromega =

Swamp greenhood

Species of orchid

Pterostylis micromega, commonly known as the swamp greenhood, is a species of greenhood orchid endemic to New Zealand. Both flowering and non-flowering plants have a rosette of leaves while flowering plants also have a single, relatively large whitish flower with a pointed dorsal sepal. The flower colour and pointed dorsal sepal are unique in New Zealand Pterostylis.

== Description ==
Pterostylis micromega is a terrestrial, perennial, deciduous, herb with an underground tuber and which often grows in loose colonies. Non-flowering plants have a rosette of broad elliptic leaves, each leaf 35–50 mm (1–2 in) long with a petiole a further 5–10 mm (0.2–0.4 in) wide. Flowering plants have a similar rosette at the base of a flowering stem 150–380 mm (6–10 in) tall with egg-shaped stem leaves wrapped around it, the highest leaf about as tall as the flower. There is a single, mostly whitish flower with a pale green tinge. The dorsal sepal and petals are fused, forming a hood or "galea" over the column. The dorsal sepal is 25–40 mm (1–2 in) long and curves forward with a tapering tip. The lateral sepals are erect, have narrow tips which are higher than the galea and there is a wide gap between them and the galea. The labellum is curved, reddish-brown and protrudes above the sinus between the lateral sepals. Flowering occurs between November and February.

== Taxonomy and naming ==
Pterostylis micromega was first formally described in 1853 by Joseph Dalton Hooker and the description was published in Flora Novae-Zelandiae. The specific epithet (micromega) is derived from the Ancient Greek words mikros meaning "small" or "little" and mega meaning "large".

== Distribution and habitat ==
The swamp greenhood grows in swampy areas sometimes in colonies of up to fifty. It has been recorded on the North, South and Chatham Islands but its distribution is now much reduced. It has not been observed on Chatham Island since the 1800s but is still present near Waikato, on the Volcanic Plateau, near Wanganui and in the Wairarapa.

== Conservation status ==
Under the New Zealand Threat Classification System, this species is listed as "Nationally Critical" with the qualifiers of "Data Poor: Recognition", "Data Poor: Trend", "Extreme Fluctuations", "Population Fragmentation" and "Range Restricted".
