= Hipaua Steaming Cliffs =

Cliffs in New Zealand

The Hipaua steaming cliffs are a geological feature on the southern shores of Lake Taupō near Little Waihi, which also has hot springs associated with the Hipaua geothermal area.

== Geology ==
=== Geothermal ===
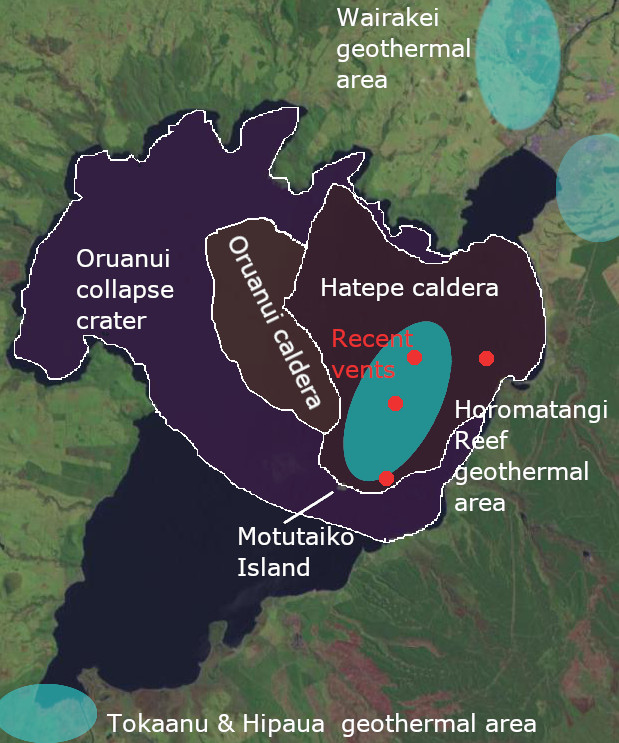
The Hipaua geothermal area is shown to the south of Lake Taupō in light blue. In this map recent eruption vents are in red and are some distance away.

The 0.75-kilometre (0.47 mi) long steaming cliffs are part of a 7-hectare (17-acre) geothermal area that crosses the escarpment on the line of the Waihi fault. The scarp is somewhat eroded and much of the steaming cliffs area is a slope of about 30 degrees covered by native bush. The largest Hipaua fumarole (Hipaua means 'the chimney') discharges at 1.4 MW and the whole geothermal area extending with hot water discharges from Little Waihi to Tokaanu Domain on the shore of the Lake itself discharges at 21MW.

=== Faults ===
The active intra-rift Waihi Fault Zone extends at least 38km from Little Waihi at Lake Taupō towards Mount Ruapehu. It has the potential to be associated with 6.5 magnitude earthquakes with recurrence intervals between 490 and 1,380 years. It may well extend in a fault complex another 14 kilometres (8.7 mi) on land or even beyond the shore line of Lake Taupō. The nearby intra-rift Poutu fault zone to the east, by about 10 kilometres (6.2 mi), is parallel to the Waihi fault and has been characterised from surface features south of the Tongariro River flood plain and estimated, to have similar magnitude earthquakes every 550 years

=== Landslides ===
Large landslides occurred on 7 May 1846 (60 dead) and 20 March 1910 (one died) adjacent to the steaming cliffs area. Maori oral tradition reported 140 died in a third slip before European contact. These landslide events have been reported to be associated with earthquakes, the potential for hydrothermal eruptions and rain and all might play roles separately or together at various times. There is evidence of at least seven such events. Since the last period of active activity on the fault scarp in 2009 which resulted in the temporary evacuation of Little Waihi, monitoring for slippage has been intensified.
