= Sir Edmund Hillary Outdoor Pursuits Centre =

The Sir Edmund Hillary Outdoor Pursuits Centre of New Zealand (OPC), renamed Hillary Outdoors Education Centres, is a New Zealand-based not-for-profit trust with two centres in the North Island. Founded in 1972 by Graeme Dingle with Edmund Hillary as patron, Hillary Outdoors has been delivering outdoor programmes to school age students for over 50 years and has around 10,000 students visits per year.

== 2008 canyon disaster ==
On 15 April 2008 heavy rain caused a rapid increase in the river level in the Mangatepopo River canyon where a school group was canyoning. Seven people including six students and one teacher died. Later investigations revealed that the OPC missed heavy weather warnings from MetService and the coronal investigation that followed revealed systemic problems in risk management, including a culture of "risk drift" wherein the level of risk in the activities undertaken gradually increased over time.

Since the tragedy, the OPC has made significant changes to their practices, including enhanced training of the staff, making sure to check other staffs day plans, and ensuring that risky activities are carried out by more than a single staff member. It also appears from the list of activities on the OPC website that canyoning is no longer one of the activities.

== Geography ==
=== Hillary Outdoors, Aotea Great Barrier Island ===
Hillary Outdoors Aotea is situated on Great Barrier Island which is 100 km to the North East of Auckland central. The centre is based in Karaka Bay in the northern end of the Island. On May 11 2024, after 18 years in operation, the Aotea centre closed due to financial difficulties.

=== Hillary Outdoors Tongariro ===
Hillary Outdoors Tongariro is situated adjacent to the Tongariro National Park in the Central Plateau of the North Island right on State Highway 47 halfway between National Park and Tūrangi. The centre itself is on Department of Conservation (DOC) land in the Tongariro National Park. As well as school programmes, Hillary Outdoors also have a tertiary programme, and a nationwide events programme.
