= Poutu Fault Zone =

Fault zone in New Zealand

Poutu fault zone
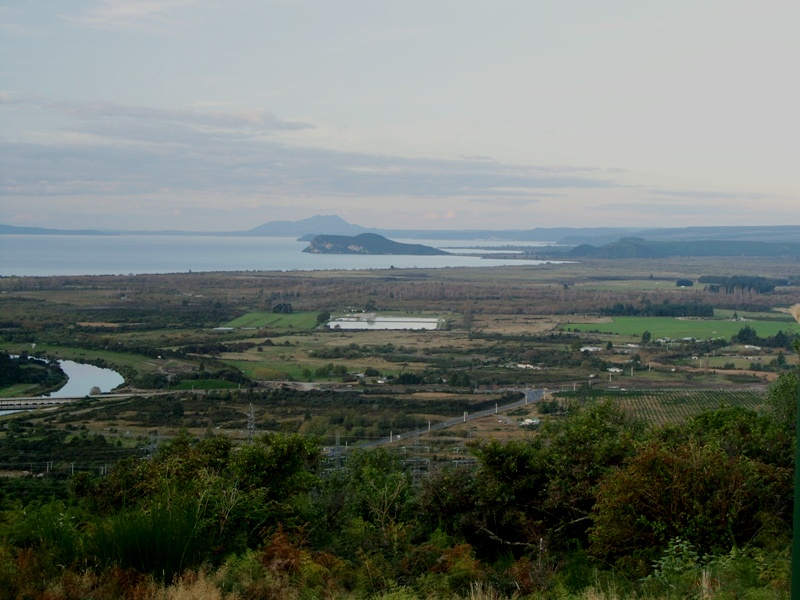
- North western most faults associated with the Poutu Fault Zone are in this view to northeast towards the Motuoapa Peninsula. A fault strike of the Rotopounamu Fault on the lakeside flats with the Motuoapa Peninsula beyond which also has an unnamed fault exist as on map below but are not obvious.
- Known active Pouto Fault Zone surface traces. For map of other nearby active faults see Taupō Rift.
- Etymology: Maori for elevation above others, mountain, column or pole
- Coordinates: 39°05′S 175°48′E
- Country: New Zealand
- Region: Waikato Region

Characteristics
- Range: Up to 6.9 Mw
- Length: 30 km (19 mi)
- Strike: N-S
- Displacement: 2.2 mm (0.087 in)/yr±1.9 mm (0.075 in)/yr

Tectonics
- Plate: Indo-Australian
- Status: Active
- Type: Normal fault
- Age: Miocene-Holocene
- Volcanic arc/belt: Taupō Volcanic Zone
- New Zealand geology database (includes faults)

The Poutu Fault Zone is a seismically active area of the central North Island of New Zealand.

== Geology ==
The intra-rift Poutu Fault Zone extends 30 kilometres (19 mi) from inland of Tūrangi on the shores of Lake Taupō towards Mount Ruapehu on the east side of the mountain. It has two segments known as the Poutu North fault at 18 kilometres (11 mi) long and the Poutu South fault at 12 kilometres (7.5 mi) long and 23 strands have been characterised which probably merge into a single fault plane at depth. The southern end of the Poutu North fault is in close proximity to a number of recently active vents of Mount Tongariro. The northern end of the Poutu North fault essentially passes under the volcanic peak of Pihanga. Accordingly there is the potential for both active faulting and magmatic processes to trigger earthquakes. The relative proportions contributed is important for determining earthquake associated risk and previous assumptions about magmatic processes being dominant are not the case. However magmatic activity is associated with higher earthquake activity and increased slippage rate. This is essentially a tectonic fault zone associated with about 65 m (213 ft) uplift in last 20,000 years making up the south eastern intra-rift faults of the Tongariro Graben in the Taupō Rift. Active faults in this region may well extend beyond the shore line of Lake Taupō. The nearby intra-rift Waihi fault zone to the west, by about 10 kilometres (6.2 mi), is parallel. The active Rotopounamu fault that has been separately named by some is now assigned to the fault zone. The Poutu fault zone to the south appears discontinuous to the active faults on the eastern side of the Ruapehu graben.

== Risk ==
Up to magnitude 6.9 earthquakes might occur with a mean of 6.6 about every 550 years along the fault.
