= Lake Otamangakau =

Lake in New Zealand

- Location within North Island
- Location: Ruapehu District, North Island
- Coordinates: 39.001°S 175.621°E
- Basin countries: New Zealand
- Max. length: 3.1 km (1.9 mi)
- Max. width: 900 m (3,000 ft)
- Surface area: 1.8 km^{2} (0.69 sq mi)
- Max. depth: 12 m (39 ft)

Lake Otamangakau is a small artificial lake located within Tongariro National Park in the Ruapehu District.

== Geography ==
Lake Otamangakau is located approximately 11 km (6.8 mi) southwest of Lake Taupō. The man-made reservoir has a size of around 1.8 km^{2} (0.69 sq mi) and extends over its northern arm in a 45-degree left curve over a length of around 3.1 km^{2} (1.2 sq mi) and over its eastern arm to the southern tip over a length of around 2.8 km (1.7 mi). Its widest point is in the middle part of the lake and extends over a length of around 900 m in a north-west-south-east direction. The deepest part of the lake is 12 m.

The reservoir is connected to two other reservoirs via two canals, one via the southwestern Otamangakau Canal, which connects Lake Te Whaiau, which in turn carries its waters to Lake Otamangakau, and the other via the Wairehu, which emanates from the eastern arm of the lake Canal with Lake Rotoaira, which is located southeast of Lake Otamangakau. The waters of Lake Otamangakau flow over the Wairehu Canal to Lake Rotoaira, which is 564 m, 47 m lower than Lake Otamangakau. It is surrounded by extensive wetlands to the east and south.

Lake Otamangakau, which is located at an altitude of 611 m, is fed by a few smaller streams from the surrounding area and the lake experiences its regular outflow via a small stream that flows into the Whanganui River around 1.7 km (1.1 mi) further.

== Otamangakau Dam ==
Otamangakau Dam is located on its southwest side and is designed as a gravity dam. It has a length of around 300 m with a crown width of around 12 m, as Forestry Road runs over the dam. Directly towards the lake, the barrier measures around 114 m at sea level and around 60 m on the western side facing away from the lake.The water outlet in the direction of the Whanganui River is on the northern side of the structure.

The target level for the lake is given as 611.98 metres above sea level.
