= Mount Tauhara =

Lava dome volcano on North Island, New Zealand

- Western slopes of Mount Tauhara beyond the Craters of the Moon geothermal area

Highest point
- Elevation: 1,088 m (3,570 ft)
- Coordinates: 38°41′40″S 176°9′46″E

Geography
- Location within North Island
- Location: North Island, New Zealand

Geology
- Mountain type: Lava dome
- Volcanic zone: Taupō Volcanic Zone
- Last eruption: Around 63,000 BCE

Climbing
- Easiest route: Hike
- Map centred on Mount Tauhara (red marker) on map of selected nearby surface volcanic features. Legend: Key for the volcanics that are shown with panning is: basalt (shades of brown/orange); monogenetic basalts; undifferentiated basalts of the Tangihua Complex in Northland Allochthon; arc basalts; arc ring basalts; dacite; andesite (shades of red); basaltic andesite; rhyolite (ignimbrite is lighter shades of violet); plutonic; White shading is selected caldera features.; Clicking on the rectangle icon enables full window and mouse-over with volcano name/wikilink and ages before present.

Mount Tauhara is a dormant lava dome volcano in New Zealand's North Island, reaching 1,088 metres (3,570 ft) above sea level. It is situated in the area of caldera rim overlap of the Whakamaru Caldera and Taupō Volcano towards the centre of the Taupō Volcanic Zone, which stretches from Whakaari / White Island in the north to Mount Ruapehu in the south. It is 6 kilometres (4 mi) east of the town of Taupō, next to the northeastern shore of Lake Taupō.

Formed about 65,000 years ago, Mount Tauhara was not a violently explosive vent, instead slowly oozing a viscous dacitic lava. It is the largest mass of dacite within the Taupō volcano, whose material is 98% rhyolitic. Little evidence of its volcanic past remains today; the peak is covered in dense native bush.

There is a steep walking track to the top of Mount Tauhara, starting at Mountain Road. On a clear day, the summit offers views over the Volcanic Plateau, encompassing the entirety of Lake Taupō in the southwest. The hike is relatively strenuous and takes about an hour and a half each way. The track is not well groomed; being slightly overgrown in some places. There is a spring near the top.

== In culture ==
In Māori tradition, Tauhara was among the mountains in the central North Island which fought for the female Pihanga. After a battle won by Tongariro, the other mountains decided to flee: Taranaki moved to his present location to the west, while Pūtauaki and Tauhara travelled north. However, due to Tauhara's sadness he moved slowly and by dawn had only reached the shore of Lake Taupō.

Tauhara is the point to which Ngātoroirangi, the high priest of Te Arawa canoe, and ariki-ancestor of Tūwharetoa, climbed when he first came to the region seeking lands for his followers.

"Tauhara" is Māori for "alone, or isolated".

== Gallery ==
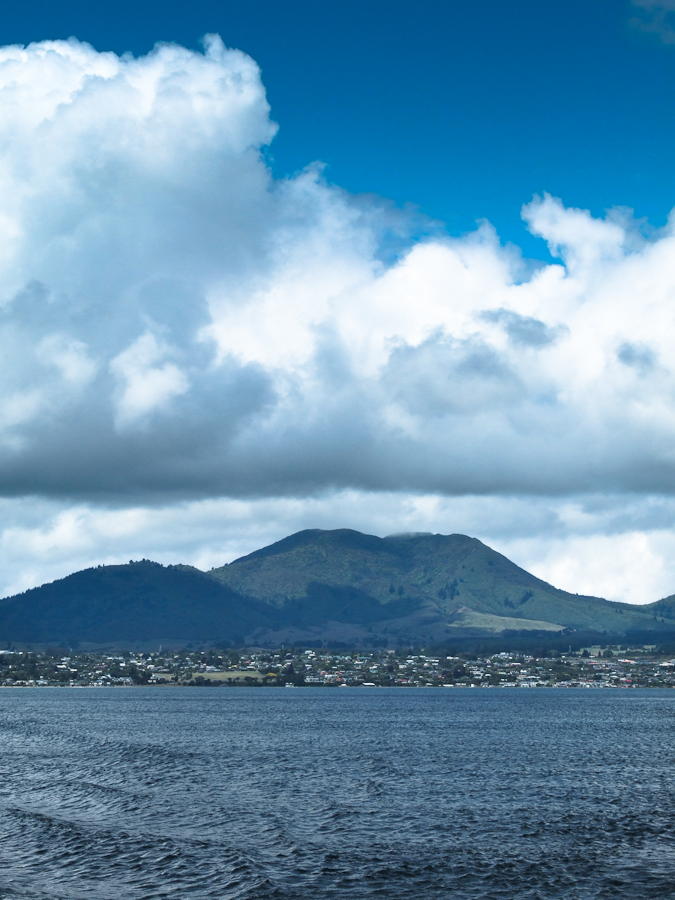

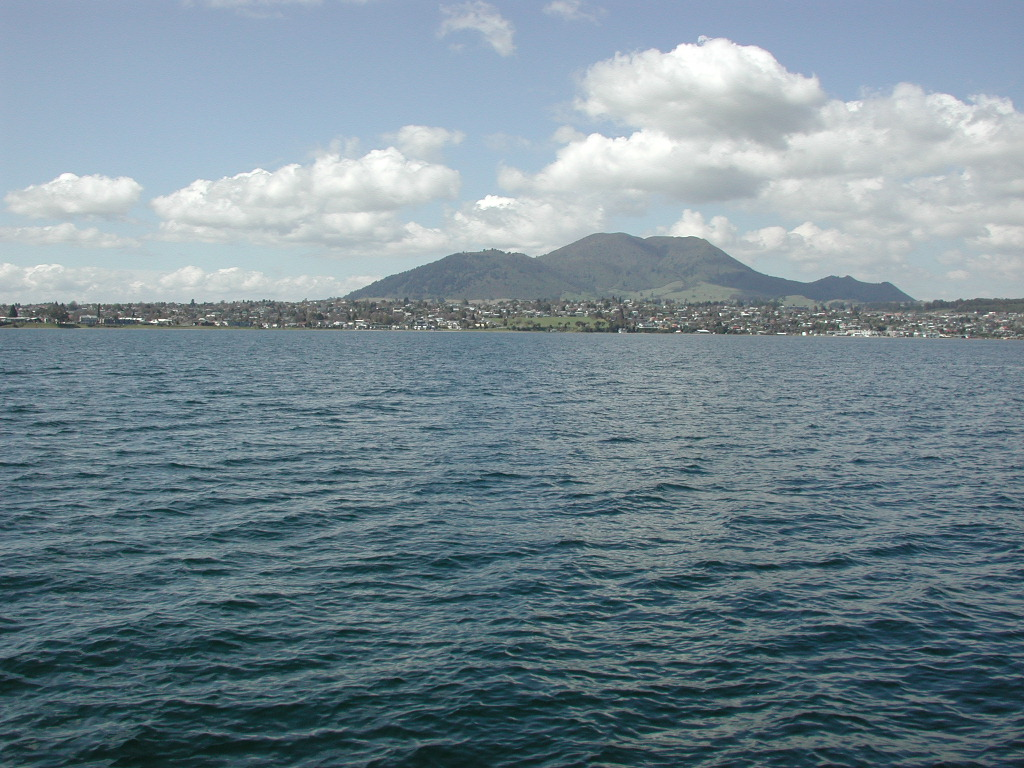

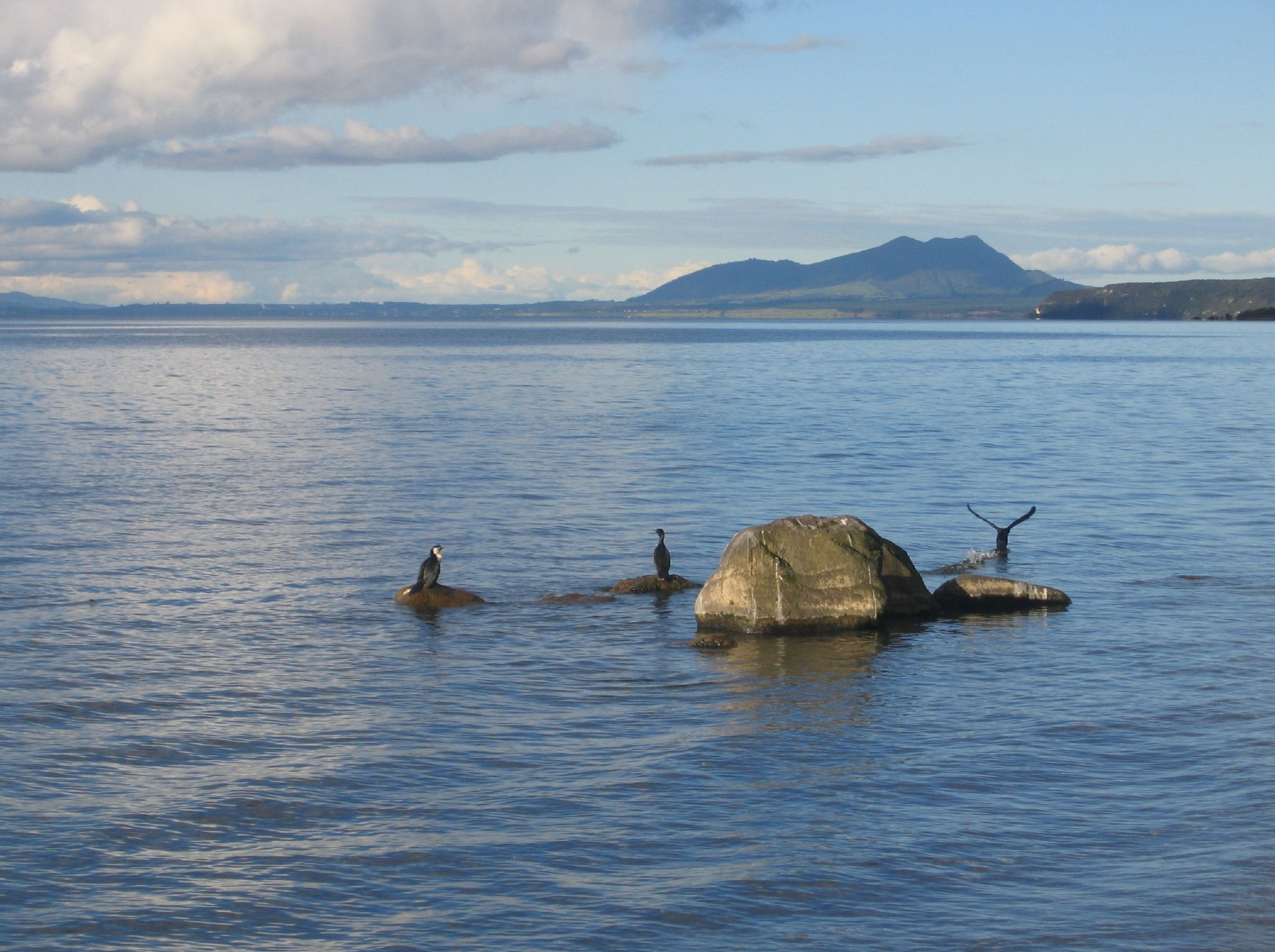

== See also ==
- List of volcanoes in New Zealand
- Tauhara – a suburb of Taupō and geothermal area
- Ngāti Tūwharetoa
