= Lake Rotoaira =

Lake in the North Island of New Zealand

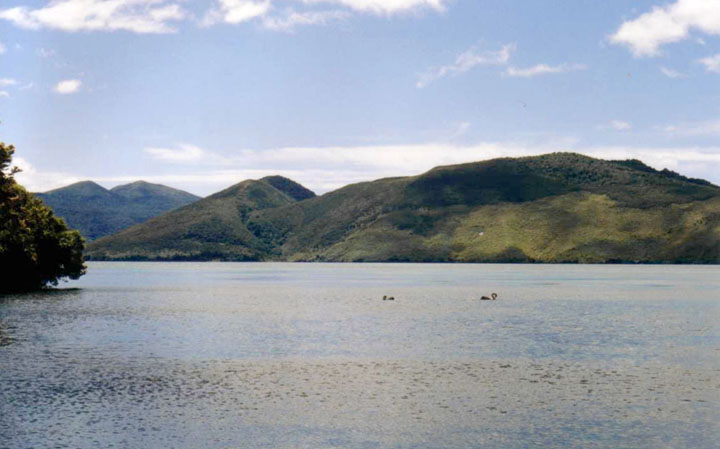
- Lake Rotoaira

- Location within North Island
- Interactive map of Lake Rotoaira
- Location: South of Lake Taupō on the North Island Volcanic Plateau, Taupō District, Waikato region
- Coordinates: 39.0545°S 175.7143°E
- Lake type: natural lake
- Primary outflows: Poutu Stream and Tokaanu Tunnel
- Basin countries: New Zealand
- Surface area: 13 km^{2} (5.0 sq mi)
- Max. depth: ca. 14 m (46 ft)
- Surface elevation: 564 m (1,850 ft)

Lake Rotoaira (sometimes written Lake Roto-aira) is a small lake to the south of Lake Taupō on the North Island Volcanic Plateau in New Zealand. It covers an area of 13 km^{2}.

Lake Rotoaira is one of the few privately owned lakes in New Zealand being administered by the Lake Rotoaira Trust on behalf of its owners. An access permit must be held by those using the lake for fishing and similar activities.

The lake is located in a graben between the broad volcanic dome of Mount Tongariro to the south and the smaller volcanic peak of Pihanga to the northwest. It is naturally drained by the Poutu Stream into the Tongariro River.

The Tongariro Power Scheme utilises Rotoaira as a storage lake for the Tokaanu Power Station. Extensive engineering works were carried out between 1964 and 1971 diverting a number of streams (including Whanganui River) into Rotoaira via Lake Otamangakau and construction of a tunnel through Pihanga to the Tokaanu Power Station. The lake originally drained into the Poutu Stream but when the Poutu Dam was constructed the lake level was raised by about 50 cm. Motuopuhi Island was formerly a peninsula but became an island when the water level was raised by the Tongariro power scheme. Motuopihi was the hiding place of Te Rauparaha and where he composed the Ka Mate haka.

Opōtaka, a traditional site of Māori occupation, is situated on the northern shore of the lake. Of significance to iwi Ngāti Tūwharetoa and Ngāti Hikairo it was excavated during archaeological investigations on the Tongariro Power Scheme and was found to have been occupied in the 19th century. In 2022 Ngāti Hikairo received funding to restore Opōtaka.

In 2021 the Lake Rotoaira Forest Trust received funding from the government's Jobs for Nature programme to remove invasive plants and animals from around the lake, particularly in the lake's wetlands.
