= Motuoapa =

Settlement in Waikato, New Zealand

- Rural settlement
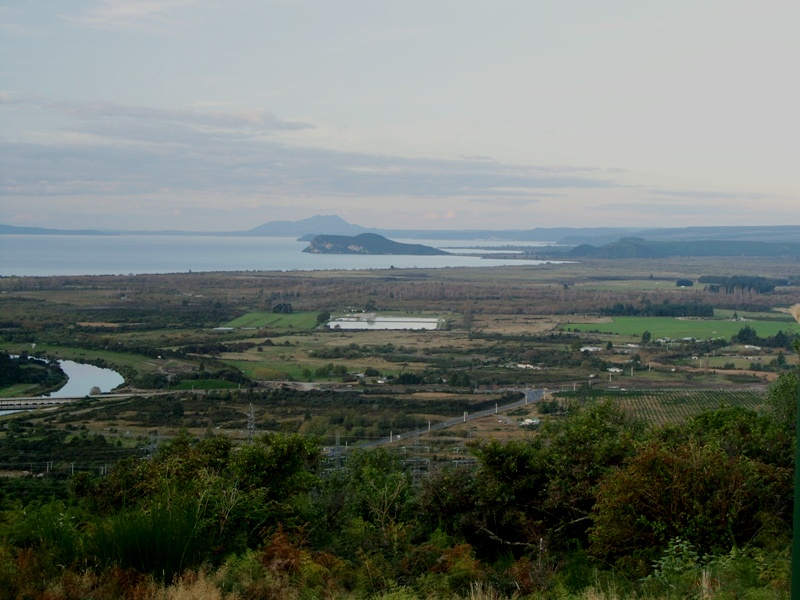
- Motuoapa and peninsula from Tūrangi towards north
- Interactive map of Motuoapa
- Coordinates: 38.934°S 175.873°E
- Country: New Zealand
- Region: Waikato region
- District: Taupō District
- Ward: Turangi-Tongariro Ward
- Community: Turangi-Tongariro Community
- Electorates: Taupō; Waiariki (Māori)

Government
  - Territorial Authority: Taupō District Council
  - Regional council: Waikato Regional Council
  - Mayor of Taupō: John Funnell
  - Taupō MP: Louise Upston
  - Waiariki MP: Rawiri Waititi

Area
  - Total: 3.34 km^{2} (1.29 sq mi)

Population (June 2025)
  - Total: 520
  - Density: 160/km^{2} (400/sq mi)

Motuoapa is a rural settlement northeast of Tūrangi, on the southeast side of New Zealand's Lake Taupō. State Highway 1 runs through it. Motuoapa Peninsula, a volcano, rises to the northwest, with a trig point at 497 metres, and Motuoapa Bay is directly to the north.

A youth hostel opened at Motuoapa in 1955 and a marina was built in 1961.

== Demographics ==
Statistics New Zealand describes Motuoapa as a rural settlement, which covers 3.34 km^{2} (1.29 sq mi). It had an estimated population of 520 as of June 2025, with a population density of 156 people per km^{2}. The settlement is part of the larger Lake Taupō Bays statistical area.

Historical population
Year	Pop.	±% p.a.
2006	228	—
2013	237	+0.55%
2018	360	+8.72%
2023	492	+6.45%

Motuoapa had a population of 492 in the 2023 New Zealand census, an increase of 132 people (36.7%) since the 2018 census, and an increase of 255 people (107.6%) since the 2013 census. There were 255 males and 237 females in 213 dwellings. 1.2% of people identified as LGBTIQ+. The median age was 58.1 years (compared with 38.1 years nationally). There were 60 people (12.2%) aged under 15 years, 48 (9.8%) aged 15 to 29, 213 (43.3%) aged 30 to 64, and 168 (34.1%) aged 65 or older.

People could identify as more than one ethnicity. The results were 82.9% European (Pākehā); 26.2% Māori; 2.4% Pasifika; 2.4% Asian; 0.6% Middle Eastern, Latin American and African New Zealanders (MELAA); and 6.1% other, which includes people giving their ethnicity as "New Zealander". English was spoken by 97.6%, Māori by 7.9%, and other languages by 3.7%. No language could be spoken by 0.6% (e.g. too young to talk). The percentage of people born overseas was 18.9, compared with 28.8% nationally.

Religious affiliations were 29.9% Christian, 3.0% Māori religious beliefs, and 1.2% other religions. People who answered that they had no religion were 51.8%, and 13.4% of people did not answer the census question.

Of those at least 15 years old, 81 (18.8%) people had a bachelor's or higher degree, 243 (56.2%) had a post-high school certificate or diploma, and 105 (24.3%) people exclusively held high school qualifications. The median income was $35,500, compared with $41,500 nationally. 33 people (7.6%) earned over $100,000 compared to 12.1% nationally. The employment status of those at least 15 was 189 (43.8%) full-time, 57 (13.2%) part-time, and 12 (2.8%) unemployed.

== Geology ==
Map showing surface volcanic deposits near Motuoapa Peninsula. Legend: Key for the volcanics that are shown with panning is: basalt (shades of brown/orange); monogenetic basalts; undifferentiated basalts of the Tangihua Complex in Northland Allochthon; arc basalts; arc ring basalts; dacite; andesite (shades of red); basaltic andesite; rhyolite (ignimbrite is lighter shades of violet); plutonic; White shading is selected caldera features.; Clicking on the rectangle icon enables full window and mouse-over with volcano name/wikilink and ages before present.

The highest point of Motuoapa Peninsula, at its north-eastern tip is a dacite volcano that has been dated as last erupting at 34,500 ± 3,100 years ago. The other volcanic formations, some of which the dacite cone is built upon, are older rhyolite with two different eruption ages of 81,300 and 77,200 years ago. At the time of the rhyolite eruptions, they were initially on the lake floor of the former Lake Huka which was replaced by Lake Taupō after the Oruanui eruption of the Taupō Volcano 25,400 years ago. Although the magma reservoir that fed these Motuoapa eruptions appears to be separate from the one(s) that produced the more recent much larger Taupō eruptions, the type of eruption commencing under water but not staying underwater is felt possible in the future from the Taupō Volcano. A perhaps unexpected characteristic is the thickness of the pyroclastic deposits produced at Motuoapa, as these indicate that such rhyolite dome building which was assumed to be mostly effusive, can have explosive pyroclastic stages that would be very disruptive and dangerous.
