= Waihi Village =

Small Maori village in New Zealand

Coordinates: 38°56′49.2″S 175°44′38.86″E

Waihi Village, also known as Little Waihi, is a small Māori community of around 25 households on the southwestern shores of Lake Taupō seven kilometres northwest of Tūrangi, New Zealand. It has been the site of three major landslides, in 1910, 1846 and around 1780, which killed over 200 people in total. The landslides flowed down the Waimatai Stream from their source above the village in the Hipaua Steaming Cliffs geothermal area.

The village's Catholic Church of Saint Werenfried featured on a 40 cent Christmas stamp in 2002.

The village was evacuated on 29 June 2009 after a series of small earthquakes, which led to fears of a landslide. Residents were allowed to return on 2 July 2009.

Waihi Village is part of the Lake Taupo Bays statistical area.

== Whare whakairo ==
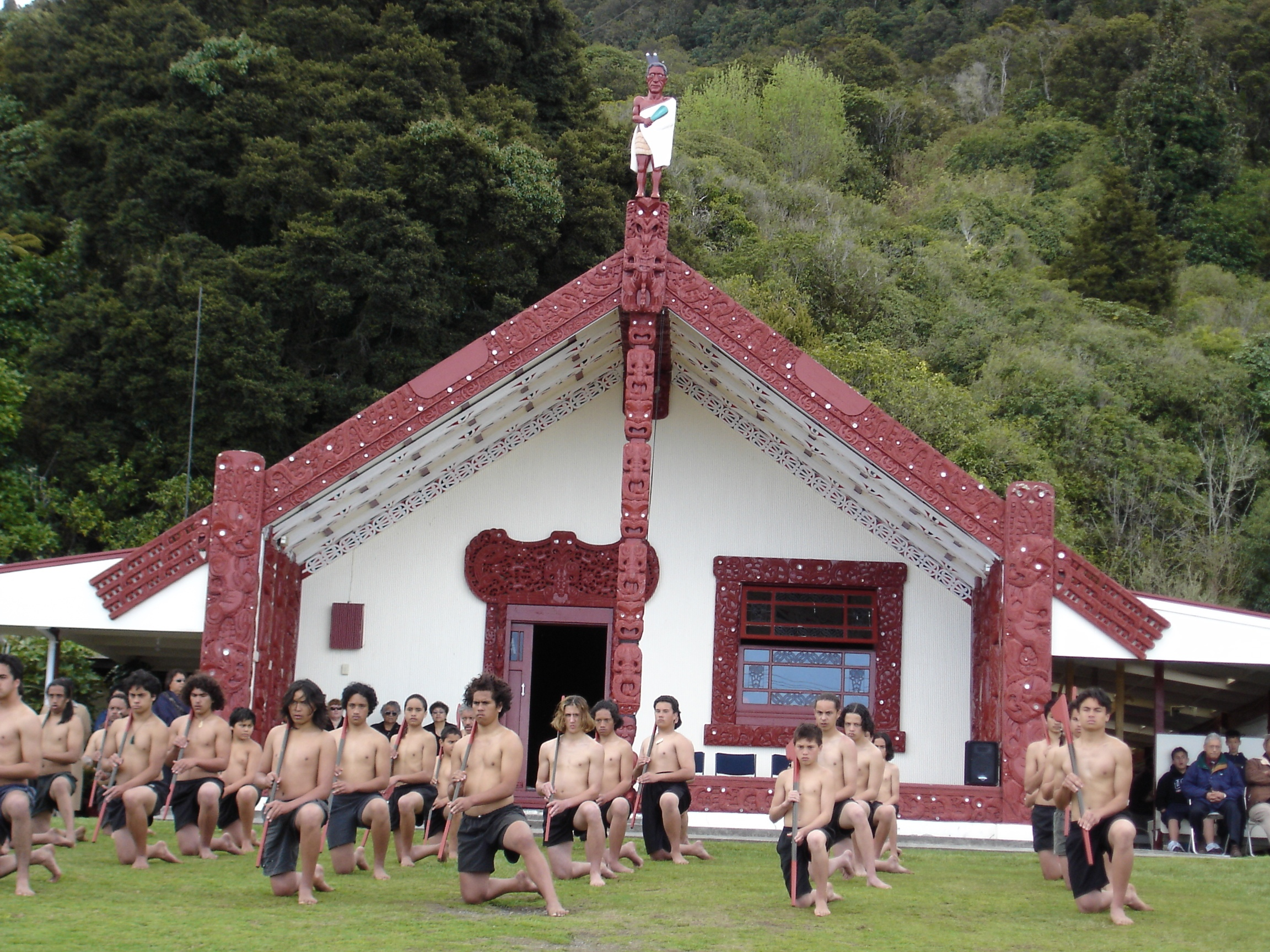
Tāpeka meeting house at Waihi marae

The official opening of Tāpeka, the whare whakairo, was held on 18 April 1959. The opening was presided over by Ngāti Tūwharetoa paramount chief, Hepi Hoani Te Heuheu Tūkino. Guests included cabinet minister Eruera Tirikatene and the Prime Minister, Walter Nash. Tāpeka was built to replace a previous whare whakairo of the same name that was reportedly unstable during earthquakes. The building project took eight years to complete and involved fundraising, volunteer labour, gala days, functions and a government subsidy.

The carvings for the former Tāpeka were presented to St Peters College, Northland for their recreation hall in 1955. All the carvings in Tāpeka (1959) were newly carved. The carving project was welcomed by Princess Te Puea to Tūrangawaewae Marae and was supervised by her nephew Tamatai Wanakore Hērangi. However, due to his ill health, the project was moved to the Rotorua School of Arts and Crafts and continued by Tuhaka Kapua and Hōne Taiapa. The carving project was eventually taken to Waihi by Taiapa.
