= Pihanga =

Volcano in Tongariro National Park, New Zealand

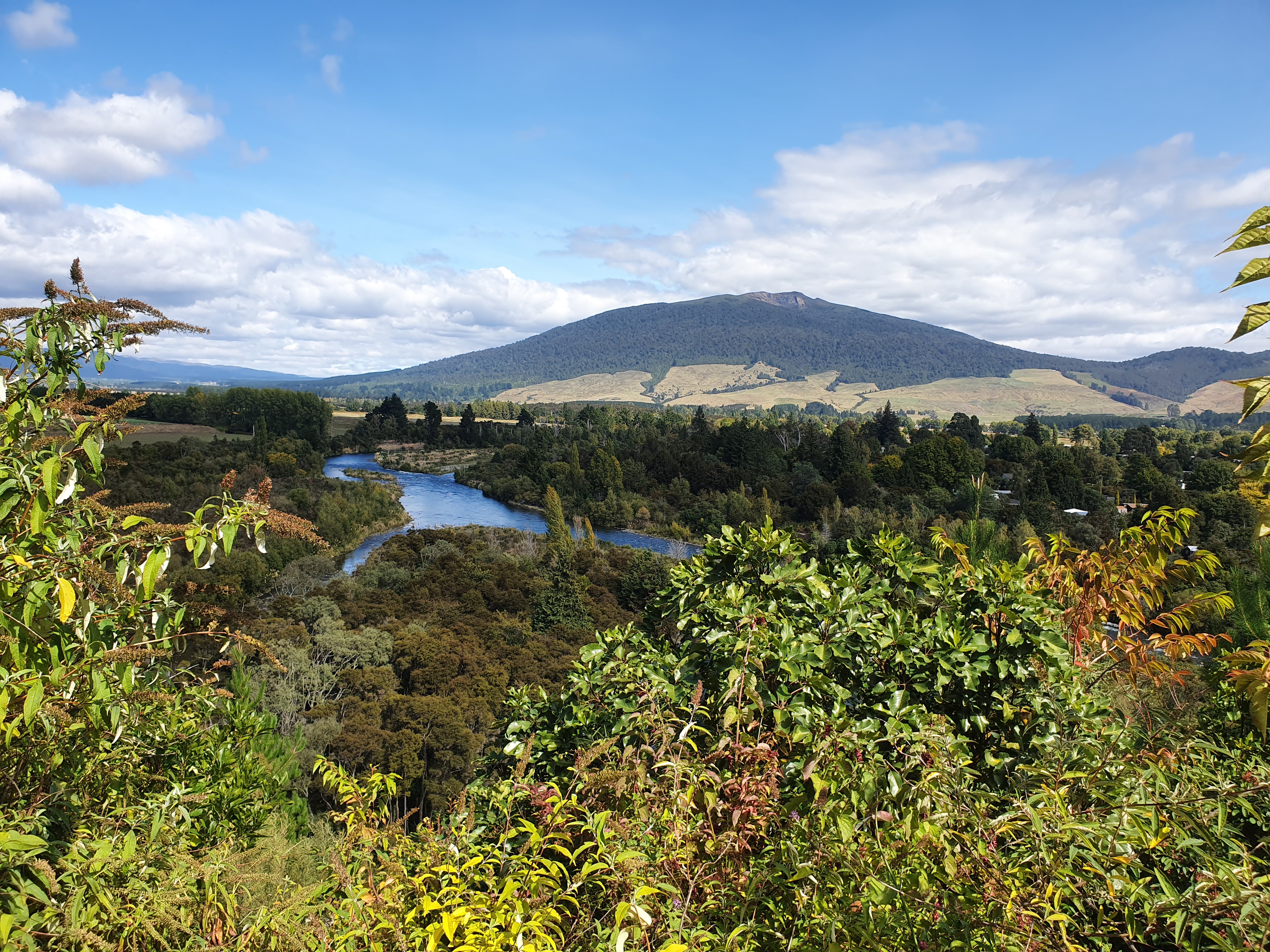

Highest point
- Elevation: 1,326 m (4,350 ft)
- Coordinates: 39°02′29″S 175°46′07″E

Geography
- Location within North Island
- Map of volcanic features near Pihanga (red marker). Surface volcanic deposits are shaded. To its immediate south west is Lake Rotoaira and beyond is Mount Tongariro with its recent vents active in the last 15,000 years shaded orange-yellow, with craters in yellow outline. Lakes in vents are outlined in blue. Rhyolitic ignimbrite surface deposits are from eruptions of the Taupō Volcano. Legend: Key for the volcanics that are shown with panning is: basalt (shades of brown/orange); monogenetic basalts; undifferentiated basalts of the Tangihua Complex in Northland Allochthon; arc basalts; arc ring basalts; dacite; andesite (shades of red); basaltic andesite; rhyolite (ignimbrite is lighter shades of violet); plutonic; White shading is selected caldera features.; Clicking on the rectangle icon enables full window and mouse-over with volcano name/wikilink and ages before present.
- Location: Taupō Volcanic Zone, New Zealand

Geology
- Mountain type: Stratovolcano
- Last eruption: at least 20,000 years ago

Pihanga is a 1,326 metres (4,350 ft) andesitic volcanic peak in the North Island Volcanic Plateau, located to the north of Mount Tongariro, between Tongariro and Lake Taupō. The nearest town to Pihanga is Tūrangi.

Lake Rotoaira lies to the south-west of Pihanga, and the smaller Lake Rotopounamu is situated on the south-western flank of the volcano, near Te Ponanga Saddle. Across the saddle to the west is the volcanic peak of Tihia.

Pihanga and Lake Rotopounamu are part of the 5,129ha Pihanga Scenic Reserve, which in 1975 was added to the Tongariro National Park.

Pihanga appears to have a large crater, but this is in fact the result of erosion, and the "crater" quickly narrows into a steep gorge.

== Geology ==
Eruptions from Pihanga last occurred more than 20,000 years ago. An age of 123 ± 10 ka has been challenged and potentially redating suggests first formation greater than 180,000 years ago. The more recent eruptions are consistent with the north-north-east to south-south-west alignment of the present southern Taupō Volcanic Zone rifting. Just to the east is the Poutu Fault Zone.

== Biology ==
Its slopes are covered in native bush and currently part of a major nature conservation project.

== Māori mythology ==
In Māori mythology, Pīhanga was the female mountain whom Taranaki and Tongariro fought over, at a time when Taranaki was also located among the central North Island mountains. Tongariro's victory resulted in Taranaki's banishment to the west coast, with his movement creating features such as the Whanganui and Pātea Rivers, and the Ngaere swamp.

== The Keepers of the Wai ==
In Māori custom, the Pihanga Maunga became the responsibility of the Matapuna people (a mix of Tuwharetoa, Tama Kopiri/Upper Whanganui whanau/Tu Hope - Descendants of Te Rere Ao, the First of Tuwharetoa) of the Tuwharetoa people, who have traditionally been the keepers of the wai (Keepers of the Water) and Maunga Kaitiaki (Protectors of the Mountain). The Pihanga mountain was an important water resource for the whole of the Tuwharetoa, Tainui, Whanganui and some parts of the East Coast rohe, are all catchments of this water source.

Some members of the chieftain line of the Matapuna people, who held mana, were given the honor of being buried on the mountain. One such chief, Pakau, interred his son, who was killed in battle, in one of the burial caves. Pakau was known to have mourned for many months over the death of his son.

== See also ==
- List of volcanoes in New Zealand
