= Mount Tongariro =

Compound volcano in New Zealand

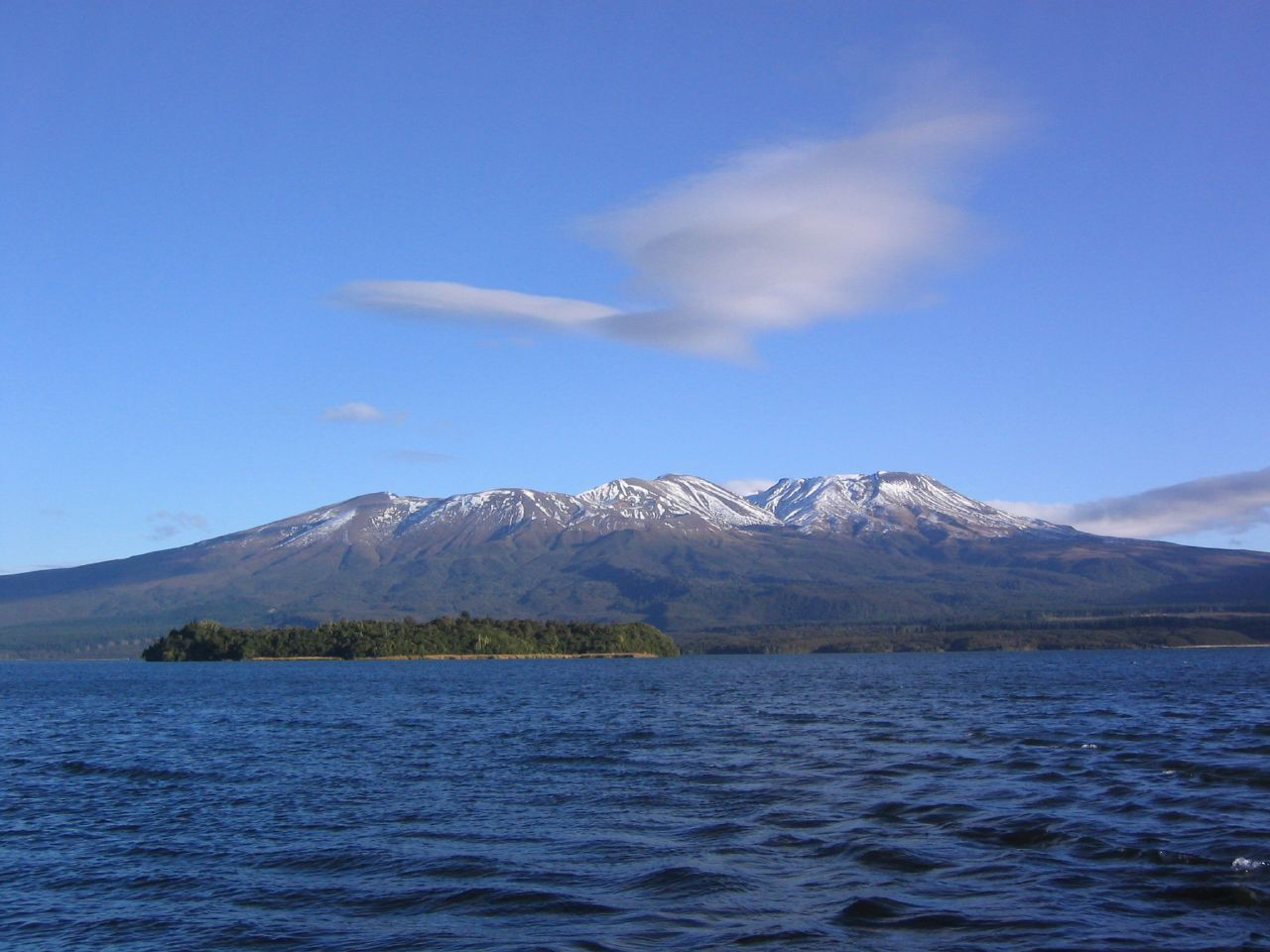

Highest point
- Elevation: 1,978 m (6,490 ft)
- Coordinates: 39°07′47″S 175°38′09″E

Geography
- Location within New Zealand
- Location: New Zealand

Geology
- Rock age: 275,000 years
- Mountain type: Complex volcano
- Volcanic zone: Taupō Volcanic Zone
- Last eruption: 21 November 2012 13:50

Climbing
- Easiest route: Tongariro Alpine Crossing
- Map centered on Mount Tongariro to show approximate selected surface volcanic features and andesitic deposits shaded red. Vents and cones or craters active in the last 15,000 years are shaded orange-yellow with craters in yellow outline. Lakes in vents are outlined in blue. To the south volcanic deposits are continuous with those from Mount Ruapehu. Mixed and sedimentary deposits are not shown. The andesitic deposits of the Kakaramea-Tihia Massif, and Pihanga are to the north beyond Lake Rotoaira. Clicking on the map enlarges it, and enables panning and mouseover of volcanic deposits name/wikilink and ages before present for wider volcanic context. The key to the shading of other volcanics that are shown (active in last million years odd) with panning is basalt (shades of brown/orange), monogenetic basalts, undifferentiated basalts, arc basalts, arc ring basalts, dacite, basaltic andesite, rhyolite, (ignimbrite is lighter shades of violet), and plutonic or intusive (gray). White shading has been used for postulated calderas (usually subsurface now).

Mount Tongariro (/ˈtɒŋɡərɪroʊ/; Māori: [tɔŋaɾiɾɔ]) is a compound volcano in the Taupō Volcanic Zone of the North Island of New Zealand. It is located 20 km (12 mi) to the southwest of Lake Taupō, and is the northernmost of the three active volcanoes that dominate the landscape of the central North Island.

== Geology ==
Mount Tongariro is part of the Tongariro volcanic centre, which consists of four massifs made of andesite: Tongariro, Kakaramea-Tihia Massif, Pihanga, and Ruapehu at the southern end of the North Island Volcanic Plateau. The andesitic eruptions formed Tongariro, a steep stratovolcano, reaching a height of 1,978 m (6,490 ft). Tongariro is composed of layers of both lava and tephra and the eruptions that built the current stratovolcano commenced about 275,000 years ago.

Tongariro consists of at least 12 cones. Ngauruhoe, while often regarded as a separate mountain, is geologically a cone of Tongariro. It is also the most active vent, having erupted more than 70 times since 1839, the last episode in 1973 to 1975.

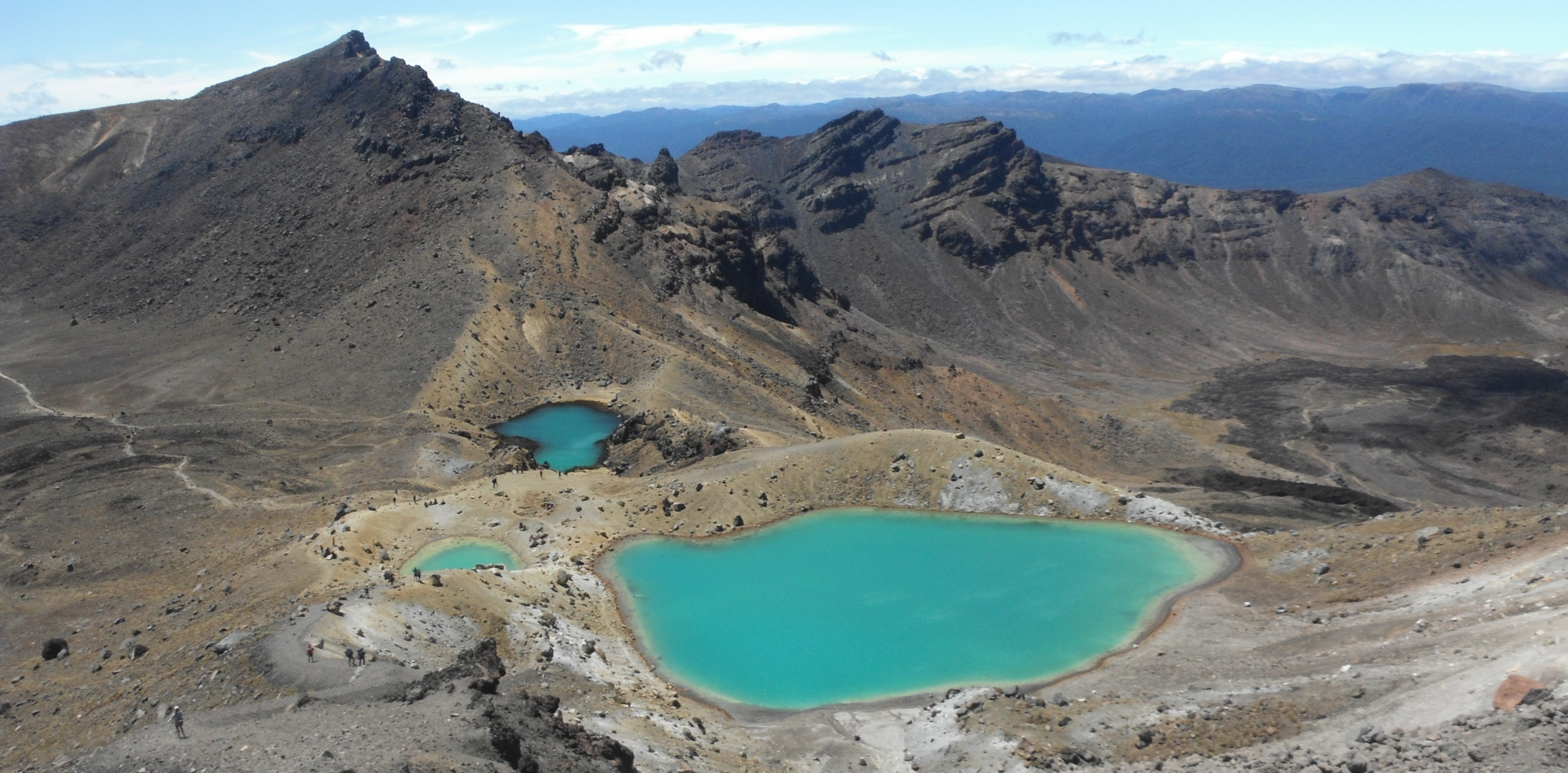
Emerald Lakes from the summit of Red Crater

Activity has also been recorded at other vents in recent history. Te Māri Craters erupted in 2012, for the first time since 1897. Red Crater last erupted ash in 1926 and contains active fumaroles. There are many explosion craters on the massif; water has filled some of these to form Blue Lake and the Emerald Lakes.

The high altitude and severe alpine climate between March and October allow snowfall in the winter (there are commercial ski-fields at neighbouring Mount Ruapehu) and rain can freeze, causing verglas; in contrast in the mid to late summer, the mountains can be bare apart from remnant patches of snow in south-facing gullies. Unlike nearby Mt. Ruapehu, no glaciers exist on Tongariro today. However, geomorphological evidence in the form of moraines and cirques indicates the former presence of mountain glaciers. Dating of moraines on western Tongariro show that valley glaciers were present at several times during the last glacial cycle, before melting away at the end of the Last Glacial Maximum approximately 18,000 years ago.

== History ==
Mount Tongariro is in the Tongariro National Park, New Zealand's first national park and one of the earliest in the world. It was set aside (literally "made sacred") in 1887 by Te Heuheu Tukino IV (Horonuku), paramount chief of the Māori Ngati Tuwharetoa iwi and made a national park in order to preserve its natural beauty. The park also includes the peaks of Ngauruhoe and Ruapehu, both of which lie to the southwest of Tongariro. The national park is a dual World Heritage Site for its outstanding natural and intangible cultural values.

The Tongariro Alpine Crossing hiking route passes between Tongariro and Ngauruhoe.

Mount Tongariro and its surroundings are also one of the several locations which Peter Jackson chose to shoot The Lord of the Rings film trilogy.

=== Eruptive history ===
The oldest recorded volcanism in the area was at 933,000 ± 46,000 years ago at Hauhungatahi, north-west of Ruapehu. There is then a gap in identified materials until a small lava inlier on the western side of Tongariro that has been dated at 512,000 ± 59,000 years ago and is essentially buried by more recent activity. The 90 km^{3} (22 cu mi) cone and 60 km^{3} (14 cu mi) ring-plain of the complex has multiple eruptive centres aligned with the Taupō volcanic rift and bounded by the Waihi and Poutu fault zones. The formation of these began about 304,000 years ago in the Tama lakes area and definitely was established by 230,000 years ago. The eruptive centres extend from the Te Maari craters in the north-east to the Tama Lakes in the south-west and include the more classic cone of Mount Ngauruhoe which like North Crater, another symmetrical but smaller cone, required the absence of ice after the last ice age to form. Tongariro displays evidence for extensive Quaternary glaciation in the form of moraines and lava-ice interaction textures. However Pukeonake is off this axis, approximately 6 km (3.7 mi) west of the linear vent zone, but is considered to be a satellite vent. The largest recent eruptions with volumes greater than 0.2 km^{3} (0.048 cu mi) occurred between 16,600 and 26,000 years ago with the Rotoaira tephras, at about 11,400 years ago producing the Pahoka tephra and the largest Mangamate Formation at about 11,200 years. The Pahoka-Mangamate sequence was an intense 200 year long period of large explosive eruptions from multiple vents between Tongariro and Ruapehu. This sequence is understood to have included a total volume of about 4.5 km^{3} (1.1 cu mi) in several episodes:

1. Te Rato Episode, with Half Cone and North Crater active at similar times producing at least a tephra volume of 0.67 km^{3} (0.16 cu mi) (DRE 0.43 km^{3} (0.10 cu mi)). This episode was from a deep magma reservoir at between 28 and 35 km (17 and 22 mi) depth.
2. Oturere Episode, with three layers with initially Half Cone and Tama Lakes vents active at similar times, to a total volume of 0.48 km^{3} (0.12 cu mi); however, the final most recent layer was from the Tama Lakes area alone.
3. Ohinepango - Waihohonu twin episodes, again from Half Cone and Tama lakes vents with the former predominant to a tolal volume of 1.11 km^{3} (0.27 cu mi)
4. Wharepu Episode, from only Tama Lake vents. This episode too was from a deep magma reservoir at between 28 and 35 km (17 and 22 mi) depth, and produced a tephra volume of at least 0.63 km^{3} (0.15 cu mi).
5. Poutu Episodes, an initial Blue Lake vent eruption was followed by a proto-Ngauruhoe vent eruption to the south of the present Ngauruhoe crater with a total of five layers of tephra deposited to a total tephra volume of 1.42 km^{3} (0.34 cu mi).

==== 2012 Te Māri eruptions ====
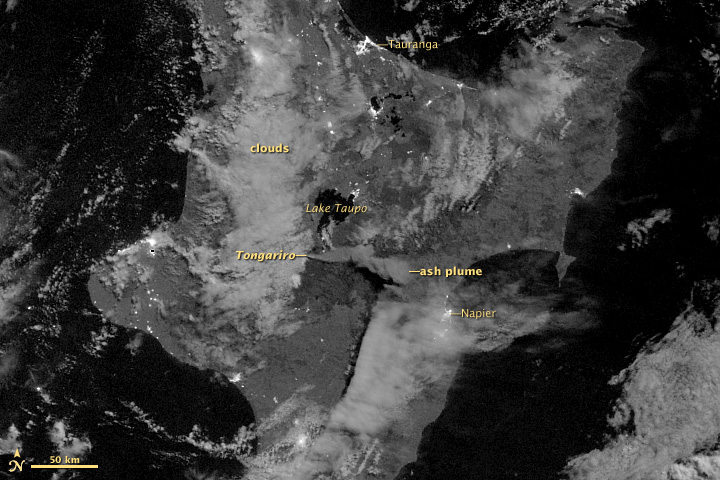
NASA satellite image of the August 2012 eruption, from Suomi NPP

After a period of volcanic unrest that had resulted in an increase in alert level on 20 July 2012, at 11:50 pm (NZST, UTC+12) on 6 August 2012, Mt Tongariro had what was initially believed to be a hydrothermal eruption after this increased activity. The eruption occurred at the Te Māri Craters, which had not had a major ash eruption since 1897 and had been dormant since September 1899.

The eruption occurred in a new vent below the Upper Te Māri crater, and sent blocks as large as 1 m (3 ft) in size up to 2 km (1.2 mi) from the vent.

An ash cloud 6.1 km (3.8 mi) high deposited ash into the surrounding area, especially to the east of the volcano. The ash cloud travelled 250 km (160 mi) in four hours. NIWA reported the ash cloud contained about 10,000 m^{3} (350,000 cu ft) of ash, and that the ash cloud was 25 km (16 mi) long and 15 km (9.3 mi) wide 39 minutes after the eruption. Ash and the smell of sulphur was reported in Napier and Hastings. The smell of sulphur was also reported in Wellington, Nelson and Blenheim.

State Highway 1 to the east and State Highway 46 to the north of the mountain each received up to 5 cm (2 in) of ash cover, and were closed until the following morning due to ash and low visibility. A layer of ash 10–15 mm (0.4–0.6 in) thick settled on farmland 5 to 10 km (3.1 to 6.2 mi) east of Mount Tongariro. Particle sizes were between 2 and 3 mm (0.08 and 0.12 in). The airspace within a 12 km (7.5 mi) radius of the mountain was closed after the eruption, but later reopened to visual flights only. Air New Zealand cancelled some flights in and out of Rotorua, Taupō, Gisborne, Napier, Wanganui and Palmerston North due to the risk of volcanic ash clogging the engines on their aircraft serving those airports.

No injuries were reported, and the only significant property damage was to the Department of Conservation's Ketetahi Hut, which is located 1.5 km (0.9 mi) west of the Te Māri Craters. There was no official evacuation but 24 people living along State Highway 46 fled their homes for fear of being isolated.

Mount Tongariro erupted again at 1:20 pm on 21 November, ejecting an ash cloud 4000 metres into the air. Flights in the area were cancelled, as were several the following morning. Geologists had no warning before the eruption, saying it was not linked to warnings the week before of elevated activity at nearby Mount Ruapehu.

== See also ==
- List of mountains of New Zealand by height
- Volcanism of New Zealand
- List of volcanoes in New Zealand
- Tongariro Northern Circuit
