= North Island Volcanic Plateau =

Pyroclastic volcanic plateau on the North Island of New Zealand

North Island Volcanic Plateau Central Plateau, Waimarino Plateau
- Volcanic plateau
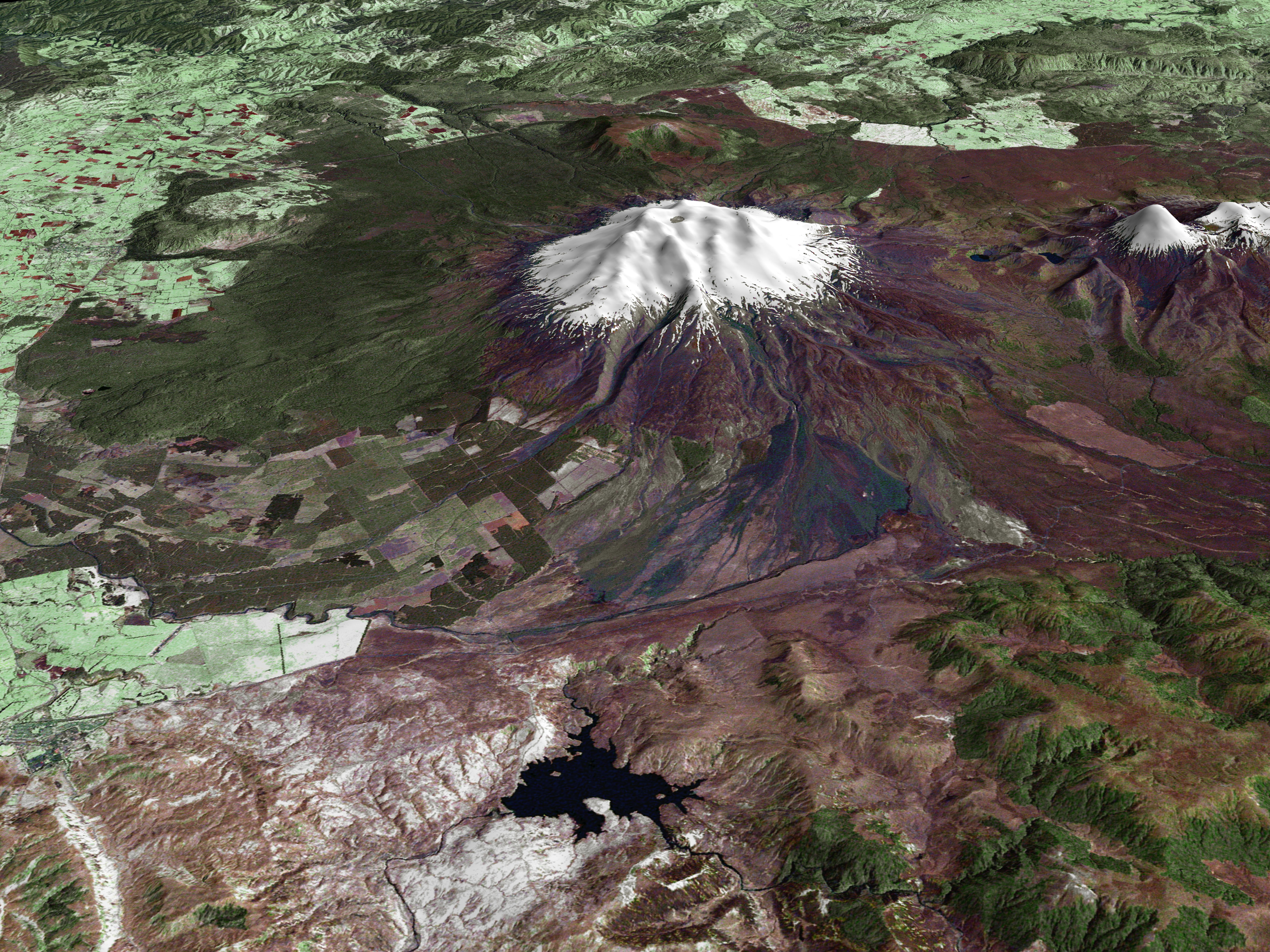
- Composite satellite image of Mount Ruapehu
- Interactive map of North Island Volcanic Plateau
- Coordinates: 39°02′27″S 175°44′04″E
- Location: North Island, New Zealand
- Formed by: Volcanic action

Dimensions
  - Length: 125 km (78 mi)
  - Width: 60 km (37 mi)
- Highest elevation: 2,797 m (9,177 ft) (Mount Ruapehu)
- Volcanic zone: Taupō Volcanic Zone
- Elevation: above 300 m (980 ft)
- Water bodies: Lake Taupō, Lake Rotorua, Lake Tarawera, Lake Rotoiti, Lake Rotomā, Lake Ōkataina, Lake Rotokākahi, Lake Ōkareka, Lake Tikitapu, Lake Rotomahana, Lake Rotoehu
- River systems: Waikato River, Kaituna River, Whanganui River

The North Island Volcanic Plateau (often called the Central Plateau and occasionally the Waimarino Plateau) is a volcanic plateau covering much of central North Island of New Zealand with volcanoes, lava plateaus, and crater lakes. It contains the Taupō caldera complex, Ōkataina caldera complex and Tongariro Volcanic Centre resulting in it being currently the most frequently active and productive area of silicic volcanism on Earth. New Zealand is part of the Pacific Ring of Fire.

== Location and description ==
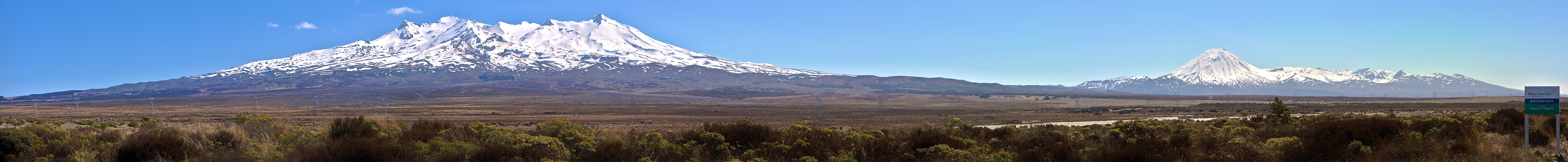
View of the Central Plateau from the Desert Road showing Mt Ruapehu (left) and with scrolling the cone of Mt Ngauruhoe and broader Mt Tongariro (right)

The plateau is approximately 60 km (37 mi) east–west and the north–south distance is about 125 km (78 mi).

Extensive ignimbrite sheets spread east and west from the Central Taupō Volcanic Zone, centred on the huge active supervolcanic caldera of Lake Taupō, now the largest lake in New Zealand. This last erupted less than 2000 years ago. The volcanic area includes the three active peaks of Mount Tongariro, Mount Ngauruhoe, and Mount Ruapehu in the south, and extends beyond Rotorua in the north reaching almost to the Bay of Plenty coast. North of Tongariro is the volcanic Mount Pihanga. The western boundary of the plateau forms an escarpment beside the Mamaku and Kaimai Ranges, but further south is less distinct. In the east, the plateau runs up to the foot of the Ahimanawa, Kaweka and the fertile Kaimanawa mountain ranges. West of the plateau stands the volcano Taranaki Maunga (in Egmont National Park).

Two of the country's longest rivers, the Whanganui and the Waikato have their headwaters on the plateau.

=== Geology ===
Map centred to show selected surface volcanic deposits that are mainly ignimbrites sheets of the North Island Volcanic Plateau. Legend: Key for the volcanics that are shown with panning is: basalt (shades of brown/orange); monogenetic basalts; undifferentiated basalts of the Tangihua Complex in Northland Allochthon; arc basalts; arc ring basalts; dacite; andesite (shades of red); basaltic andesite; rhyolite (ignimbrite is lighter shades of violet); plutonic; White shading is selected caldera features.; Clicking on the rectangle icon enables full window and mouse-over with volcano name/wikilink and ages before present.

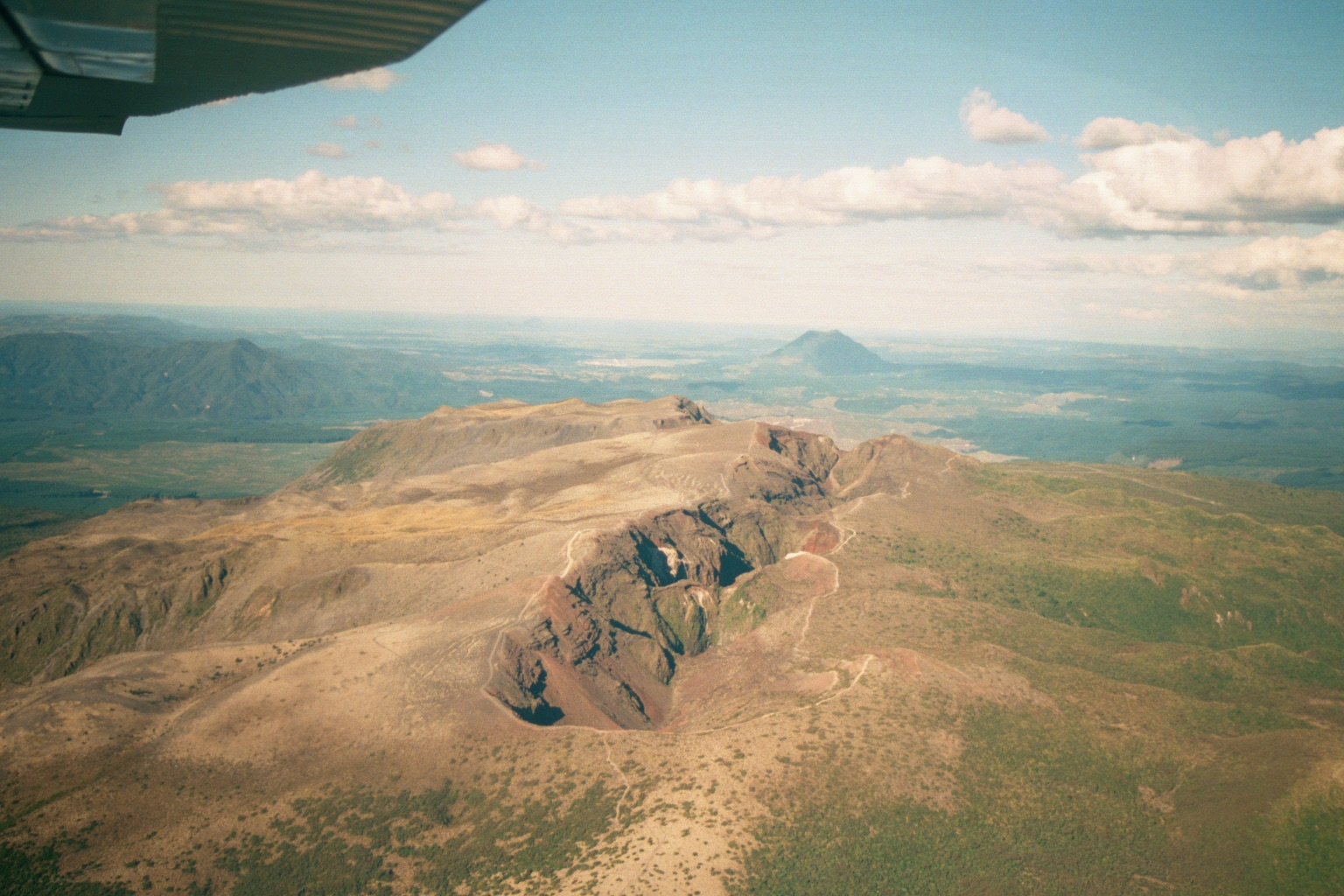
Southwest side of Mount Tarawera, Mount Edgecumbe in the background

The tallest mountain, Ruapehu, is an andesite cone that was somewhat higher but has been eroded with a 150 km^{3} (36 cu mi) cone and 150 km^{3} (36 cu mi) ring-plain. It is typical of the Tongariro Volcanic Centre, whose landforms are defined by the intermediate properties of its andesite magma, having a moderate amount of silica, making it more viscous than basalt, but much less viscous than rhyolite. Andesite magma in effusive eruptions cools to form dark grey lava if gas-poor or scoria if gas-rich. The explosive eruptions tend to be small or moderate sized phreatomagmatic eruptions where the hot magma turns water into steam and the magma into ash. Northwest of Ruapehu is Hauhungatahi, the oldest recorded volcano in the south of the plateau. The other two most prominent volcanic mountains are Tongariro and Ngauruhoe, part of a single composite stratovolcano, like Ruapehu, made up of layers of lava and tephra.

The ring plain around the central volcanoes is formed from numerous volcanic deposits from slope failure or eruptions, and lahars or mudflows that occur when either the crater lake water is ejected from Ruapehu during an eruption, or snow melt is released by failure of the crater walls such as failure of an ice dam, separate from an eruptive event. In the case of lahars, they run down the mountain, picking up ash, lapilli, blocks and bombs as well as previously eroded rock, forming a thick, dense mud that is capable of picking up car-sized rocks. An old lahar flow is visible from the approach road to Whakapapa ski field. On Christmas Eve 1953 a sudden lahar at night on Mt Ruapehu knocked out the rail bridge at Tangiwai, causing six carriages of the Wellington–Auckland express to plunge into the Whangaehu River, killing 151 people in New Zealand's worst railway disaster.

The percentage of silica is the deciding factor in the thickness or viscosity of the magma and this increases to the north and east of the Tongariro Volcanic Centre, where there is a landscape of calderas and volcanic domes making up the Taupō caldera complex (Central Taupō Volcanic Zone) and Okataina caldera complex (Okataina Volcanic Centre). These produced much of the ignimbrite sheet deposits of the plateau. Ignimbrite is formed from very viscous rhyolite magma which is rich in silicon, potassium, and sodium. It is the gas-rich material ejected from the ground at high speed in an explosive caldera-forming event, creating a giant white hot fountain up to 55 kilometres high. When the ignimbrite falls it flows outwards at high speed (600–900 km/h) and can travel many kilometres, even going up and over hills and mountains before it cools, often trapping air inside. Especially around Lake Taupō the eroded ignimbrite includes pieces of quickly cooled pumice, a lightweight rock that floats on water. The top, unwelded layer of the ignimbrite sheet is relatively soft and easily eroded by streams and rivers, which transport the pumice to the lake. The lower, welded layers of the ignimbrite sheets are more dense, though still porous. These lower compressed layers often show the glint of heated silicon specks. North of the plateau this stone, called Hinuera stone (after a quarry of origin), is produced for use for building cladding. An historic eruption at the north west edge of the plateau at Mangakino about 1 million years ago produced ignimbrite that 170 km (110 mi) away in Auckland is up to 9 m (30 ft) thick.

The last massive eruption in the area was the Hatepe eruption from the Lake Taupō volcanic complex 1800 years ago, which ejected lava and especially wind-blown tephra over a wide area to the north and northeast of the North Island. About 30 km^{3} (7.2 cu mi) of material was ejected in the space of a few minutes, in what is thought to be New Zealand's largest eruption in last 20,000 years, but the entire eruption sequence ejected over 120 km^{3} (29 cu mi) in a little longer period which might have lasted several years. As is typical after such degassing events which are separated in considerable time, dome building by effusive eruption of low gas viscous rhyolite magma then occurred resulting in this case the formation of the Horomatangi Reefs about 200 years later. Another example in Lake Taupo of such a volcanic dome is Motutaiko Island and towards the north west of the plateau is the lava dome of Mount Tarawera which was split in half by a later relatively small explosive eruption as recently as 1886 with the greatest loss of human life documented from an eruption in New Zealand history. A subsequent risk assessment suggests the Tarawera containing Okataina caldera complex as the highest risk volcanic field in New Zealand to man.

The plateau is entirely above 200 metres, with much of the part south of Lake Taupō more than 800 metres above sea level. This reflects that the underlying marine sedimentary deposits and subsequent volcanic deposits related to the Taupō Rift have been raised by up to a maximum of 2.5 km (1.6 mi) during the last 5 million years in the central North Island. Such a process of surface uplift in an extensional regime is believed to be related to the continental nature of the underlying plate.

=== Climate ===
The plateau has a mild climate although the temperature regularly falls below freezing in winter and snow can fall between March and October. Of all North Island regions, the Volcanic Plateau is closest to having a continental climate. The period of maximum snow is July to September. Sudden blizzard conditions can be experienced on the volcanoes in winter. Such conditions have killed climbers as recently as 2019. The Desert Road on State Highway 1 is often closed by snow in winter for brief periods.

=== Flora ===
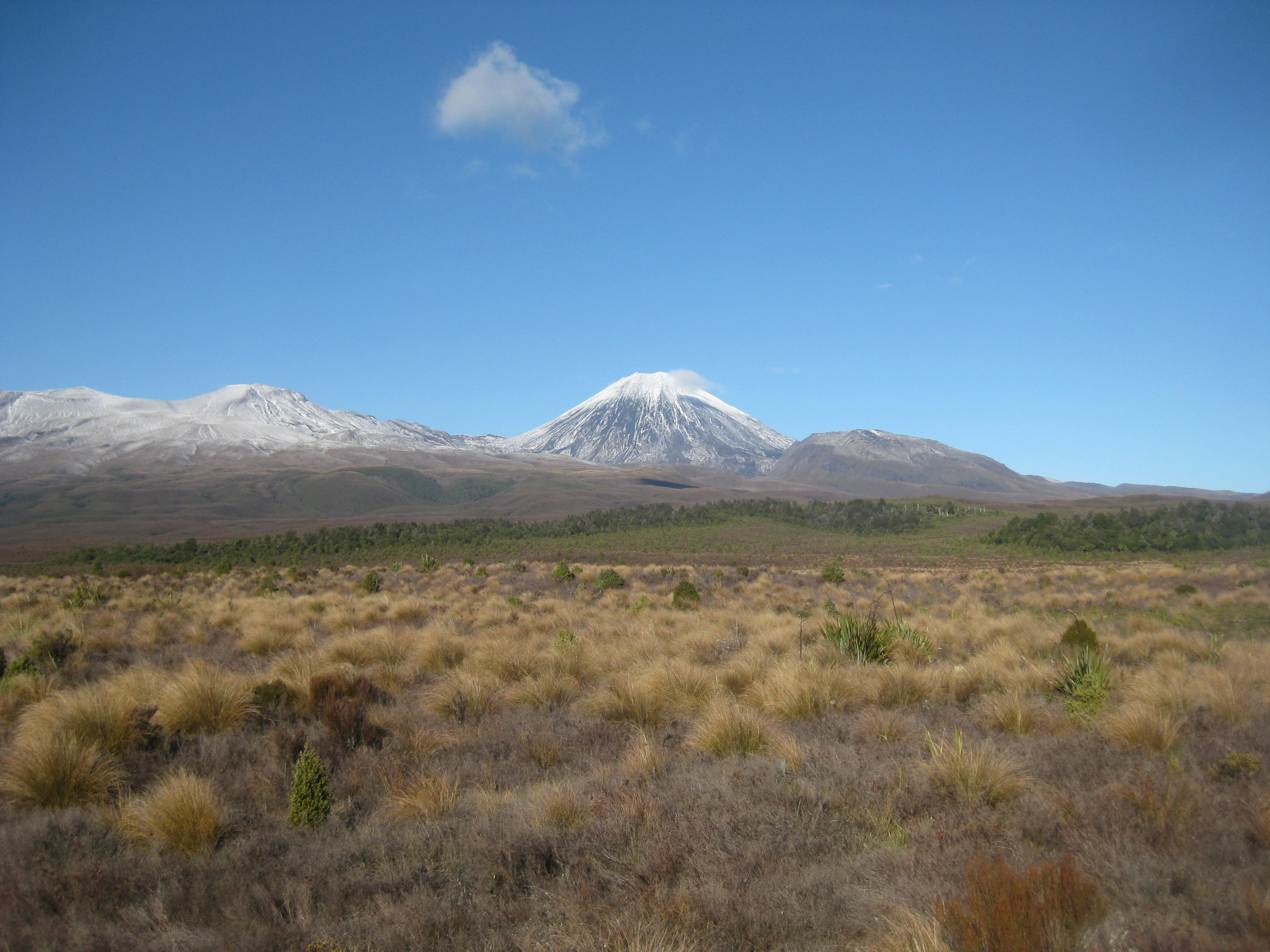
Tongariro National Park

The natural vegetation of the area includes the podocarp conifers including rimu (Dacrydium cupressinum), miro (Prumnopitys ferruginea), mataī (Prumnopitys taxifolia), tōtara (Podocarpus totara) and kahikatea (Dacrycarpus dacrydioides) and hardwoods that once covered this whole area before the eruption of Taupō and other volcanoes. To the west of the three large volcanoes, the land is rough forested hill country, while the north close to Lake Taupō is more fertile and undulating and much has been cleared for farming. The forest used to extend to the west coast and there are still patches of natural vegetation in wetlands including the Horowhenua floodplains.

However to the south of Taupō the barren, ash-laden soils and harsh alpine climate leave the high land largely bare and unprofitable, capable of growing only scrubby plants. This area is known as the Rangipo Desert although it is not a true desert as the annual rainfall is over 1,000mm PA and the real reason for the low and sparse vegetation was the mass sterilisation of seeds caused by the 26,000-year-old Taupō eruption, which swept white-hot ignimbrite through this valley. Prior to this cataclysmic event this area was forested and stumps of charcoalised trees can be seen where soil has eroded. Around Taupō itself there are geothermal areas with specialised plant life such as the prostrate kanuka (a subspecies of kunzea ericoides).

Further to the east of the plateau lies more rough hill country in the Kaimanawa Ranges, a popular hunting area for wild red and sika deer. The tops of the mountains are open and tussock covered. Helicopters and light aircraft can land on a rough air strip. Hunting range in the bush is often 50 m or less but in the open tops the range can be much further. The area to the south, around Lake Moawhango is richer in plant life. Finally there are areas of beech forest and alpine vegetation at higher elevations throughout the region.

=== Fauna ===
The northern side of the plateau especially is home to wildlife including birds such as the North Island kōkako wattlebird (Callaeas wilsoni), New Zealand kaka, and large populations of brown kiwi (Apteryx australis) and blue duck (Hymenolaimus malacorhynchos). The area to the south of the plateau and down to Wellington is home to a variety of lizards including Whitaker's skink (Cyclodina whitakeri), forest gecko (Hoplodactylus granulatus) and Wellington green gecko (Naultinus elegans punctatus). Wetlands throughout the region support waterbirds and fish including the endemic brown mudfish.

== Threats and preservation ==
The lowland areas are quite highly populated and therefore urban development, agriculture and forestry are a major threat to natural habitats there. One block of lowland forest remains in and around Whanganui National Park and large areas of the uplands are protected either by Maori tradition or in national parks of which Te Urewera is the largest. The four North Island national parks, which surround the plateau, are Te Urewera, Whanganui, Egmont and New Zealand's first national park, the World Heritage listed Tongariro National Park. Introduced species and livestock grazing are now major threats to some endemic species. Rats, cats and stoats prey on native reptiles and birds (including the kokako, blue duck and brown kiwi), while imported plants such as old man's beard, banana passionfruit and gorse can take over from indigenous species. Finally grazing by goats and possums can eradicate others such as kamahi, kaikawaka (Libocedrus bidwillii) and mountain tōtara. Therefore, smaller islands off the coast of Wellington have been used as a refuge for North Island birds and reptiles whose habitats may be threatened now or in the future.

Also the Volcanic Plateau region has the largest area of man made forest in the Southern Hemisphere. Nearly all the trees are Pinus radiata which were bought in for trials at Rotorua in 1899 from Kew Gardens, London. The tree, a native of Monterey, California, grew very fast in the poor soils. Mass planting was initially carried out by prisoners in the 1920s and then by the unemployed on a large scale during the Great Depression. After World War II scientists from Norway settled in the region and helped develop ways of treating the soft pine to prevent rotting using pressure treatment with chemicals. They also introduced selective breeding methods which was the standard way of improving the trees until tissue culture was introduced in the 1990s. Trees take 25–30 years to reach full height. Most plantations use growth factor (GF) trees to guarantee very high quality (straight and knot-free) timber, however treatment by chemical salts is still required to stop rotting. This is done by either dipping or more usually, pressure treatment. New Zealand has pioneered the use of Radiata timber and plywood in small craft boatbuilding. Untreated clear timber or plywood is used that is then encapsulated in epoxy resin after construction. The key reason is the low cost of the wood rather than any inherent properties of the wood which is of moderate weight but fractures easily when bent, when dried to 12% moisture. One of the largest ply factories in New Zealand is located on the Volcanic Plateau at Tokoroa. Although planting by hand is still done on steeper land, most seedlings are now planted with the help of machines.

Urban areas in the region include the towns of Taihape in the south, Ohakune the carrot-growing capital of NZ in the west, and Taupō in the north, with Tūrangi a major trout fishing base at the south of Lake Taupō and by the Kaweka Ranges in the east, The majority of the population of the area lives close to the shores of Lake Taupō, with some smaller settlements to the east of the volcanoes. These make their living largely through tourism, including skiing in the winter season, trout fishing, especially on the Tongariro river or by forestry in the plateau's northeast, which includes the Kaingaroa Forest or by working on the extensive hydro electric power system.

== History ==
The Māori population during the Archaic period was sparse. Only two moa hunter period sites have been discovered to date. The best known is the Whakamoenga cave near Taupō. The cave was in use about 600 years ago and three moa bones, obsidian flakes, hollow pumice stone ash holders, pumice floats, a fishing net, bird spears, pieces of hue (gourd) and bracken remains have been found. The other moa hunter site is at Tokoroa.

The tangata whenua are the Ngāti Tūwharetoa. Their paramount chief is Sir Tumu te Heuheu. They moved into this area after splitting away from the Arawa tribe on the east coast. The boundary between Arawa and Tuwharetoa is a small island 400 metres north of Huka Falls on the Waikato River. Their main marae is on the southern shores of Lake Taupō at Waihi near the Tokaanu geothermal area. They still retain ownership of the peaks of the mountains which are considered sacred, as well as the Ketetahi hot springs on the north slope of Mt Tongariro. The Māori people considered the volcanoes sacred and in traditional times wore woven flax eye shields to avoid looking at the peaks.

The Rangipo region is largely uninhabited. It is used by the New Zealand Army, based at Waiouru in the south, and by the Rangipo prison farm in the north and Rangipo underground HEP station to the east. During the 1960s the Tongariro Power Scheme redirected the flow of water from many of the streams and rivers that drain the central peaks. The water was channelled into canals, tunnels and storage lakes to provide water for 2 HEP stations at Rangipo and Tokaanu. The water then flowed into Lake Taupō increasing its input by 20%. Most of the Tongariro river flow is not included in the power scheme due to its importance as a breeding area for brown and rainbow trout. The extra water boosted the amount of water available to the 10 other HEP stations on the Waikato River which flows from the north end of the lake and is its only exit.

The productivity of pasture on the plateau was greatly improved in the 1950s once it was realised that the "bush sickness" suffered by local livestock was due to cobalt deficient volcanic soils. The diagnosis and cure for this was discovered by work of New Zealand scientists (Grimmett and Shorland, senior chemists at the Department of Agriculture in 1934) who found that the iron ore which gave the best results contained significant amounts of cobalt, and went against popular wisdom by dosing animals with cobalt, with spectacular results. Australians Underwood and Filmer in 1936 confirmed this and solved a similar issue in cattle in Australia. However the application of cobalt at the rate of 30cc per ha was only possible after World War II making use of war surplus planes and ex WW2 pilots for aerial topdressing. The cobalt was mixed with crushed phosphate rock which was obtained cheaply from Nauru Island in the West Pacific. The resulting mix was called Super Phosphate.

The largest farm - as measured by effective area farmed - in the North Island including 13,800 hectares of land with about 9,500 hectares of developed farm land was established off the Taupō-Napier road and is called Lochinver Station. The station was largely developed by construction millionaire Bill Stephenson and his family using heavy earthmoving equipment in the 1960s and 1970s. In 2015 it was sold to Rimanui Farms after a bid by Chinese interests was blocked by the government. The high country sheep and cattle station has several airstrips, 21 houses and 200 km of roading. It historically carried 100,000 breeding ewes and about 8,000 cattle but now carries about a third of these. It has extensive shelter belts of contorta pine, improved rye-grass pasture and grows crops of swedes and barley. It previously was open to tourist and school group bus tours.

== Adventure and tourism ==
Tourism is an economic mainstay of the region with a wide range of largely outdoor attractions from trout fishing, flyfishing on Tongariro River and harling on Lake Taupō, tramping, mountain biking centred on National Park, deer and pig hunting, horse riding to snowskiing/boarding on Mt Ruapehu. The Sir Edmund Hillary Outdoor Pursuits Centre, started by mountaineer Graeme Dingle in the 1970s, provides outdoor training experience and skills to secondary school groups and others.

The Raurimu Spiral is a railway spiral travelling upwards 122 m (400 ft) in 1.6 km (0.99 mi), via tunnels and 180-degree hairpin bends so the passengers near the head of the train can see the rear carriages heading in the opposite direction. At the time of construction it was considered a masterpiece of engineering. This was the last stage to be built in the main trunk railway line completed in 1908.

The Cold Kiwi Motorcycle Rally, advertised as NZ's longest running motorcycle rally, has been held on the plateau since 1972. The event is run by the Ruapehu Motorcycle Club in early September each year. Bikers sleep in their own tents despite the average temperature being −8 °C at night, but the club provides hot food and drinks, a bonfire, as well as competitions, souvenirs, live bands and toilet facilities.

The one-day Tongariro Alpine Crossing from the Mangatepopo Valley across Mt Ngauruhoe and Mt Tongariro is named one of the greatest one-day walks in the world by the Department of Conservation. The 19.2 km track is well marked in summer and popular, but trampers need to be quite fit and well equipped as the route is exposed, especially during the winter months (April to September), when the route poles are sometimes hidden by snow or blown away. There are two well equipped huts near the ends of route.
