= 1257 Samalas eruption =

Volcanic eruption in Indonesia

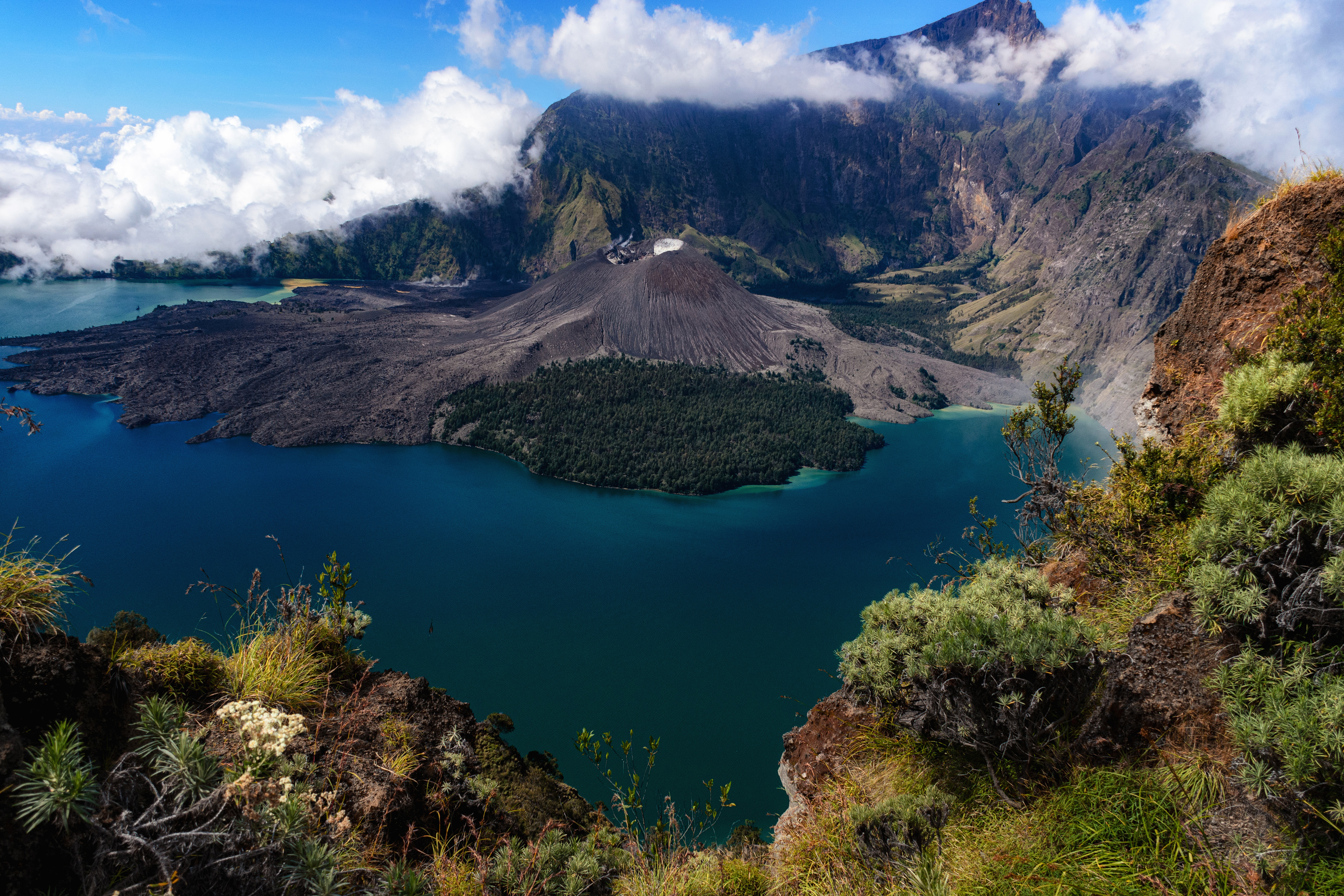
- View of Mount Samalas along with Mount Rinjani
- Volcano: Samalas
- Date: 1257
- Type: Ultra-Plinian
- Location: Lombok, Indonesia; 8°24′36″S 116°24′30″E
- VEI: 7

Maps
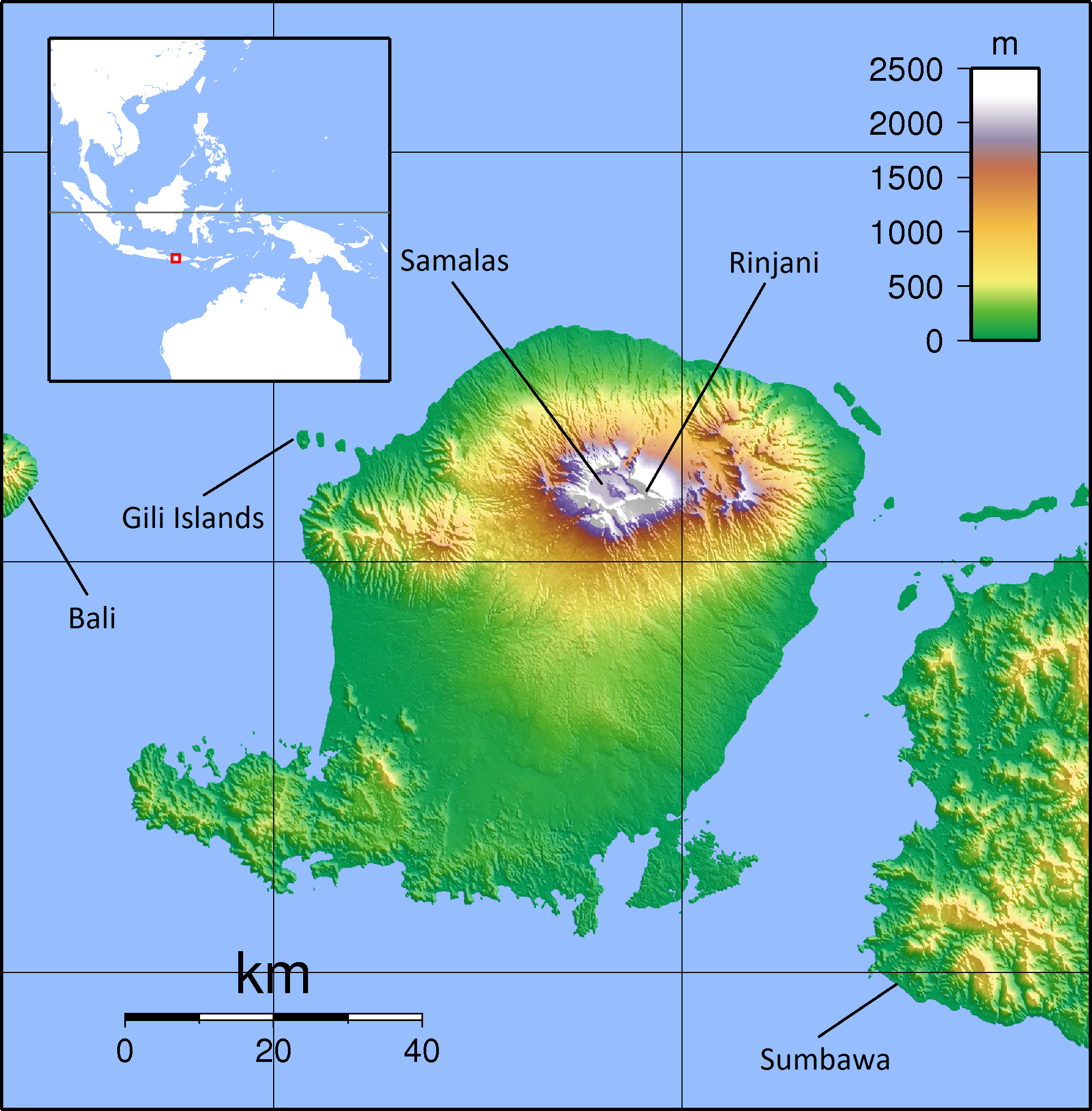
- The volcano-caldera complex in the north of Lombok

In 1257, a catastrophic eruption occurred at Samalas, a volcano on the Indonesian island of Lombok. The event had a probable Volcanic Explosivity Index of 7, (Note: The Volcanic Explosivity Index is a scale that measures the intensity of an explosive eruption; a magnitude of 7 indicates an eruption that produces at least 100 cubic kilometres (24 cu mi) of volcanic deposits. Such eruptions occur once or twice per millennium, although their frequency might be underestimated due to incomplete geological and historical records.) making it one of the largest volcanic eruptions during the Holocene epoch. It left behind a large caldera that contains Lake Segara Anak. Later volcanic activity created more volcanic centres in the caldera, including the Barujari cone, which remains active.

The event created eruption columns reaching tens of kilometres into the atmosphere and pyroclastic flows that buried much of Lombok and crossed the sea to reach the neighbouring island of Sumbawa. The flows destroyed human habitations, including the city of Pamatan, which was the capital of a kingdom on Lombok. Ash from the eruption fell as far as 340 kilometres (210 mi) away in Java; the volcano deposited more than 10 cubic kilometres (2.4 cu mi) of rocks and ash.

The aerosols injected into the atmosphere reduced the solar radiation reaching the Earth's surface, causing a volcanic winter and cooling the atmosphere for several years. This led to famines and crop failures in Europe and elsewhere, although the exact scale of the temperature anomalies and their consequences is still debated. The eruption may have helped trigger the Little Ice Age, a centuries-long cold period during the last thousand years.

Before the site of the eruption was known, an examination of ice cores around the world had detected a large spike in sulfate deposition from around 1257 providing strong evidence of a large volcanic eruption occurring at that time. In 2013, scientists linked the historical records about Mount Samalas to these spikes. These records were written by people who witnessed the event and recorded it on the Babad Lombok, a document written on palm leaves.

== Geology ==
Samalas (also known as Rinjani Tua) was part of what is now the Rinjani volcanic complex, on Lombok, in Indonesia. The remains of the volcano form the Segara Anak caldera, with Mount Rinjani at its eastern edge. Since the destruction of Samalas, two new volcanoes, Rombongan and Barujari, have formed in the caldera. Mount Rinjani has also been volcanically active, forming its own crater, Segara Muncar. Other volcanoes in the region include Agung, Batur, and Bratan, on the island of Bali to the west.

Location of Lombok

Lombok is one of the Lesser Sunda Islands in the Sunda Arc of Indonesia, a subduction zone where the Indo-Australian Plate subducts beneath the Eurasian Plate at a rate of 7 centimetres per year (2.8 in/year). The magmas feeding Mount Samalas and Mount Rinjani are likely derived from peridotite rocks beneath Lombok, in the mantle wedge. Before the eruption, Mount Samalas may have been as tall as 4,200 ± 100 metres (13,780 ± 330 ft), based on reconstructions that extrapolate upwards from the surviving lower slopes, and thus taller than Mount Kinabalu which is presently the highest mountain in tropical Asia; Samalas's current height is less than that of the neighbouring Mount Rinjani, which reaches 3,726 metres (12,224 ft).

The oldest geological units on Lombok are from the Oligocene–Miocene, with old volcanic units cropping out in southern parts of the island. Samalas was built up by volcanic activity before 12,000 BP. Rinjani formed between 11,940 ± 40 and 2,550 ± 50 BP. During the early Holocene (before 5,300 BCE), there were few large explosive eruptions at Samalas and Rinjani, but activity later picked up:

- A little understood eruption (probably at Rinjani) between 5,990 ± 50 and 2,550 ± 50 BP formed the Propok Pumice with a dense rock equivalent volume of 0.1 cubic kilometres (0.024 cu mi). Samalas collapsed southward, probably during the Propok Pumice eruption, forming a hilly landslide deposit south of the volcano. This deposit covers an area of about 535 square kilometres (207 sq mi) with about 15 cubic kilometres (3.6 cu mi) of rock, making it the third-largest such deposit in Indonesia. Before the collapse, Samalas might have reached an elevation of 4,207 metres (13,802 ft).
- The Rinjani Pumice, with a volume of 0.3 cubic kilometres (0.072 cu mi) dense rock equivalent, (Note: The dense rock equivalent is a measure of how voluminous the magma that the pyroclastic material originated from was.) may have been deposited by an eruption from either Rinjani or Samalas; it is dated to 2,550 ± 50 BP, at the end of the time range during which Rinjani formed. The deposits from this eruption reached thicknesses of 6 centimetres (2.4 in) 28 kilometres (17 mi) away.

Additional eruptions by either Rinjani or Samalas are dated 11,980 ± 40, 11,940 ± 40, and 6,250 ± 40 BP. Eruptive activity continued until about 500 years before 1257. Most volcanic activity now occurs at the Barujari volcano with eruptions in 1884, 1904, 1906, 1909, 1915, 1966, 1994, 2004, and 2009; Rombongan was active in 1944. Volcanic activity mostly consists of explosive eruptions and ash flows.

The rocks of the Samalas volcano are mostly dacitic, with a SiO_{2} content of 62–63 percent by weight. The rocks expelled during the 1257 eruption formed from aluminum-rich basalt through fractional crystallization and other physical processes. Volcanic rocks in the Banda arc are mostly calc-alkaline ranging from basalt over andesite to dacite. The crust beneath the volcano is about 20 kilometres (12 mi) thick, and the lower extremity of the Wadati–Benioff zone is about 164 kilometres (102 mi) deep.

== Eruption ==
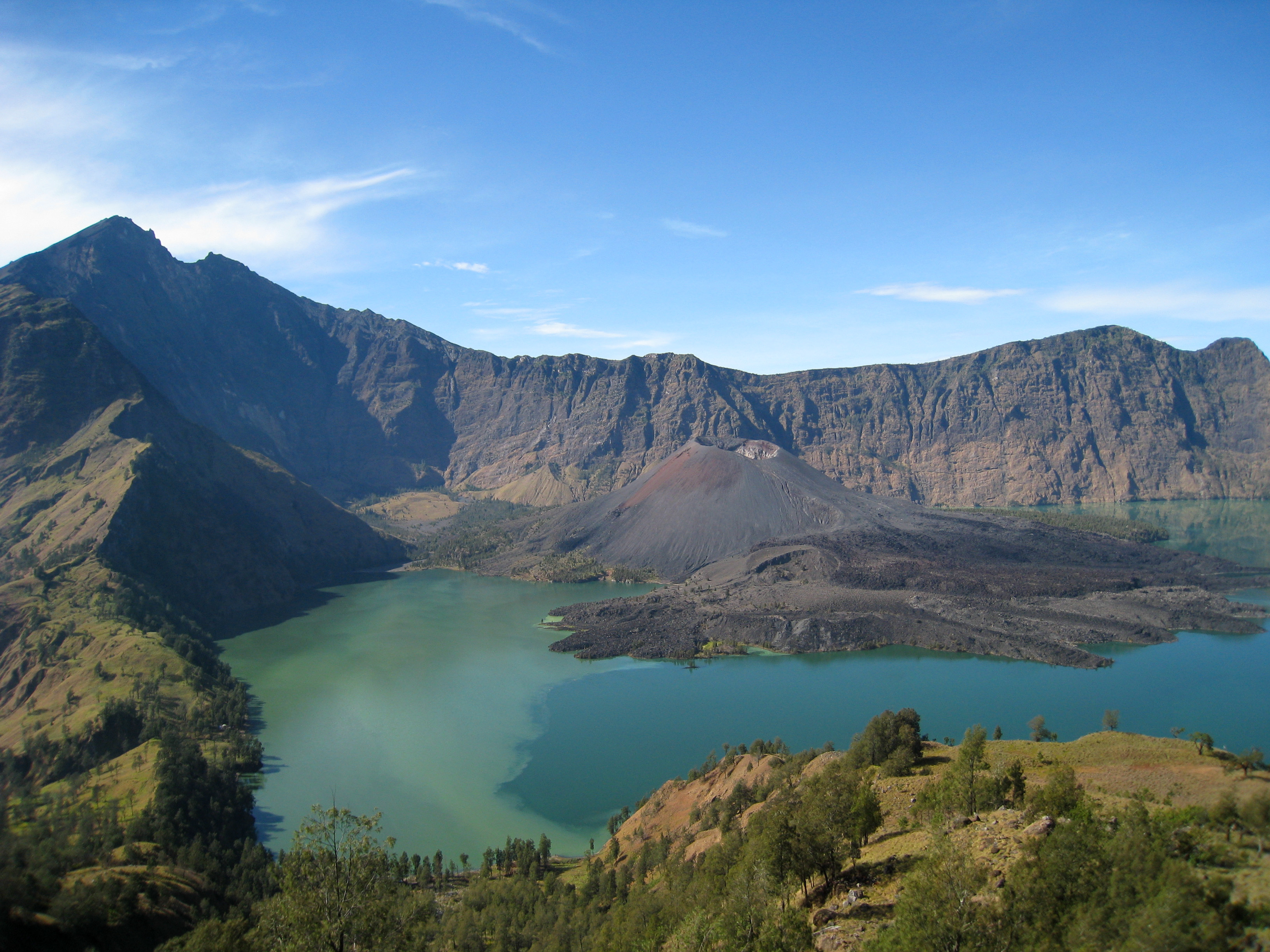
The Segara Anak caldera, which was created by the eruption

The events of the 1257 eruption have been reconstructed through geological analysis of the deposits it left and by historical records. The eruption probably occurred during the northern summer in September (uncertainty of 2–3 months) that year, in light of the time it would have taken for its traces to reach the polar ice sheets and be recorded in ice cores and the pattern of tephra deposits. 1257 is the most likely year of the eruption, although a date of 1258 is also possible. It is possible that the accumulation of vapours in the magmatic system over the preceding centuries destabilized it, until the 1257 eruption commenced.

=== Phases ===
The phases of the eruption are also known as P1 (phreatic and magmatic phase), P2 (phreatomagmatic with pyroclastic flows), P3 (Plinian) and P4 (pyroclastic flows). They produced rocks with similar composition, unlike other volcanoes where different stages often feature rocks with different compositions. The duration of the P1 and P3 phases is not known individually, but the two phases combined (not including P2) lasted between 12 and 15 hours. The eruption column reached a height of 39–40 kilometres (24–25 mi) during the first stage (P1), and of 38–43 kilometres (24–27 mi) during the third stage (P3); it was high enough that SO_{2} in it and its sulfur isotope ratio was influenced by photolysis at high altitudes.

=== Event ===
The eruption began with a phreatic (steam explosion powered) stage that deposited 3 centimetres (1.2 in) of ash over 400 square kilometres (150 sq mi) of northwest Lombok. A magmatic stage followed, and lithic-rich pumice rained down, the fallout reaching a thickness of 8 centimetres (3.1 in) both upwind on East Lombok and on Bali. This was followed by lapilli rock as well as ash fallout, and pyroclastic flows that were partially confined within the valleys on Samalas's western flank. Some ash deposits were eroded by the pyroclastic flows, which created furrow structures in the ash. Pyroclastic flows crossed 10 kilometres (6.2 mi) of the Bali Sea, reaching the Gili Islands to the northwest of Samalas and Taliwang east of Lombok, while pumice blocks presumably covered the Alas Strait between Lombok and Sumbawa. The deposits show evidence of interaction of the lava with water, so this eruption phase was probably phreatomagmatic. It was followed by three pumice fallout episodes, with deposits over an area wider than was reached by any of the other eruption phases. These pumices fell up to 61 kilometres (38 mi) to the east, against the prevailing wind, in Sumbawa, where they are up to 7 centimetres (2.8 in) thick.

The deposition of these pumices was followed by another stage of pyroclastic flow activity, probably caused by the collapse of the eruption column that generated the flows. At this time the eruption changed from an eruption-column-generating stage to a fountain-like stage and the caldera began to form. These pyroclastic flows were deflected by the topography of Lombok, filling valleys and moving around obstacles such as older volcanoes as they expanded across the island incinerating the island's vegetation. Interaction between these flows and the air triggered the formation of additional eruption clouds and secondary pyroclastic flows. Where the flows entered the sea north and east of Lombok, steam explosions created pumice cones on the beaches and additional secondary pyroclastic flows.

Pyroclastic flows descended the northern slopes of Samalas; on the southern slopes they split into two branches that proceeded to the Alas Strait to the east and the Bali Strait to the west. Coral reefs were buried by the pyroclastic flows; some flows crossed the Alas Strait between Sumbawa and Lombok and formed deposits on Sumbawa. These pyroclastic flows reached volumes of 29 cubic kilometres (7.0 cu mi) on Lombok, and thicknesses of 35 metres (115 ft) as far as 25 kilometres (16 mi) from Samalas. The pyroclastic flows altered the geography of Lombok; they and sediments eroded from the Samalas deposits extended the shorelines of the island and buried river valleys; a new river network developed on the volcanic deposits after the eruption.

=== Rock and ash ===
Volcanic rocks ejected by the eruption covered Bali and Lombok and parts of Sumbawa. Tephra in the form of layers of fine ash from the eruption fell as far away as Java, forming part of the Muntilan Tephra, which was found on the slopes of other volcanoes of Java, but could not be linked to eruptions in these volcanic systems. This tephra is now considered to be a product of the 1257 eruption and is thus also known as the Samalas Tephra. It reaches thicknesses of 2–3 centimetres (0.79–1.18 in) on Mount Merapi, 15 centimetres (5.9 in) on Mount Bromo, 22 centimetres (8.7 in) at Ijen and 12–17 centimetres (4.7–6.7 in) on Bali's Agung volcano. In Lake Logung 340 kilometres (210 mi) away from Samalas on Java it is 3 centimetres (1.2 in) thick. Most of the tephra was deposited west-southwest of Samalas. Considering the thickness of Samalas Tephra found at Mount Merapi, the total volume may have reached 32–39 cubic kilometres (7.7–9.4 cu mi). The dispersal index (the surface area covered by an ash or tephra fall) of the eruption reached 7,500 square kilometres (2,900 sq mi) during the first stage and 110,500 square kilometres (42,700 sq mi) during the third stage, implying that these were a Plinian eruption and an Ultraplinian eruption respectively.

Pumice falls with a fine graining and creamy colour from the Samalas eruption have been used as a tephrochronological marker on Bali. (Note: Tephrochronology is a technique for dating archaeological, geological and palaeoenvironmental sequences and events by their location between upper and lower layers of tephra (volcanic ejecta) of known date, and for correlating such sequences and events at separate locations between the same layers.) Tephra from the volcano was found in Colombian sediments, and in ice cores as far as 13,500 kilometres (8,400 mi) away, and a tephra layer sampled at Dongdao island in the South China Sea has been tentatively linked to Samalas. Ash and aerosols might have impacted humans and corals at large distances from the eruption.

There are several estimates of the volumes expelled during the various stages of the Samalas eruption. The first stage reached a volume of 12.6–13.4 cubic kilometres (3.0–3.2 cu mi). The phreatomagmatic phase has been estimated to have had a volume of 0.9–3.5 cubic kilometres (0.22–0.84 cu mi). The total dense rock equivalent volume of the whole eruption was at least 40 cubic kilometres (9.6 cu mi). On Lombok, it forms the Kalibabak Formation, a geological rock formation. The magma erupted was trachydacitic and contained amphibole, apatite, clinopyroxene, iron sulfide, orthopyroxene, plagioclase, and titanomagnetite. It formed out of basaltic magma by fractional crystallization and had a temperature of about 1,000 °C (1,830 °F). Its eruption may have been triggered either by the entry of new magma into the magma chamber or the effects of gas bubble buoyancy.

=== Intensity ===
The eruption had a Volcanic Explosivity Index of 7, making it one of the largest eruptions of the current epoch, the Holocene. Eruptions of comparable intensity include the Kurile lake eruption (in Kamchatka, Russia) in the 7th millennium BC, the Mount Mazama (United States, Oregon) eruption in the 6th millennium BC, the Cerro Blanco (Argentina) eruption about 4,200 years ago, the Minoan eruption (in Santorini, Greece) between 1627 and 1600 BC, the Tierra Blanca Joven eruption of Lake Ilopango (El Salvador) in the 5th century, and Mt. Tambora in 1815. Such large volcanic eruptions can result in catastrophic impacts on humans and widespread loss of life both close to the volcano and at greater distances.

=== Caldera ===
The eruption created the 6–7 kilometres (3.7–4.3 mi) wide Segara Anak caldera where the Samalas mountain was formerly located; within its 700–2,800 metres (2,300–9,200 ft) high walls, a 200 metres (660 ft) deep crater lake formed called Lake Segara Anak. The Barujari cone rises 320 metres (1,050 ft) above the water of the lake and has erupted 15 times since 1847. A crater lake may have existed on Samalas before the eruption and supplied its phreatomagmatic phase with 0.1–0.3 cubic kilometres (0.024–0.072 cu mi) of water. Alternatively, the water could have been supplied by aquifers. Approximately 2.1–2.9 cubic kilometres (0.50–0.70 cu mi) of rock from Rinjani fell into the caldera, a collapse that was witnessed by humans and left a collapse structure that cuts into Rinjani's slopes facing the Samalas caldera.

The eruption that formed the caldera was first recognized in 2003, and in 2004 a volume of 10 cubic kilometres (2.4 cu mi) was attributed to this eruption. Early research considered that the caldera-forming eruption occurred between 1210 and 1300. In 2013, Lavigne suggested that the eruption occurred between May and October 1257, resulting in the climate changes of 1258. Several villages on Lombok are constructed on the pyroclastic flow deposits from the 1257 event.

== Research history ==
A major volcanic event in 1257–1258 was first discovered from data in ice cores; specifically increased sulfate concentrations were found in 1980 within the Crête ice core (Greenland, drilled in 1974) associated with a deposit of rhyolitic ash. The eruption was known as the "mystery eruption". The 1257–1258 layer is the third largest sulfate signal at Crête; at first a source in a volcano near Greenland had been considered but Icelandic records made no mention of eruptions around 1250 and it was found in 1988 that ice cores in Antarctica—at Byrd Station and the South Pole—also contained sulfate signals. Sulfate spikes were also found in ice cores from Ellesmere Island, Canada, and the Samalas sulfate spikes were used as stratigraphic markers for ice cores even before the volcano that caused them was known.

The ice cores indicated a large sulfate spike, accompanied by tephra deposition, around 1257–1259, the largest (Note: Sulfate spikes around 44 BC and 426 BC, discovered later, rival its size.) in 7,000 years and twice the size of the spike due to the 1815 eruption of Tambora. In 2003, a dense rock equivalent volume of 200–800 cubic kilometres (48–192 cu mi) was estimated for this eruption, but it was also proposed that the eruption might have been somewhat smaller and richer in sulfur. The volcano responsible was thought to be located in the Ring of Fire but could not be identified at first; Tofua volcano in Tonga was proposed at first but dismissed, as the Tofua eruption was too small to generate the 1257 sulfate spikes. A volcanic eruption in 1256 at Harrat al-Rahat near Medina was also too small to trigger these events. Other proposals included several simultaneous eruptions. The diameter of the caldera left by the eruption was estimated to be 10–30 kilometres (6.2–18.6 mi), and the location was estimated to be close to the equator and probably north of it.

While at first no clear-cut climate anomaly could be correlated to the 1257 sulfate layers, in 2000 climate phenomena were identified in medieval records of the northern hemisphere that are characteristic for volcanic eruptions. Earlier, climate alterations had been reported from studies of tree rings and climate reconstructions. The deposits showed that climate disturbances reported at that time were due to a volcanic event, the global spread indicating a tropical volcano as the cause.

The suggestion that Samalas/Rinjani might be the source volcano was first raised in 2012, since the other candidate volcanoes—El Chichón and Quilotoa—did not match the chemistry of the sulfur spikes. El Chichon, Quilotoa and Okataina were also inconsistent with the timespan and size of the eruption.

All houses were destroyed and swept away, floating on the sea, and many people died.

— Babad Lombok

The conclusive link between these events and an eruption of Samalas was made in 2013 on the basis of radiocarbon dating of trees on Lombok and the Babad Lombok, a series of writings in Old Javanese on palm leaves that described a catastrophic volcanic event on Lombok which occurred before 1300. These findings induced Franck Lavigne, a geoscientist of the Pantheon-Sorbonne University who had already suspected that a volcano on that island may be responsible, to conclude that the Samalas volcano was this volcano. The role of the Samalas eruption in the global climate events was confirmed by comparing the geochemistry of glass shards found in ice cores to that of the eruption deposits on Lombok. Later, geochemical similarities between tephra found in polar ice cores and eruption products of Samalas reinforced this localization.

== Climate effects ==
=== Aerosol and paleoclimate data ===
Ice cores in the northern and southern hemisphere display sulfate spikes associated with Samalas. The signal is the strongest in the southern hemisphere over the last 1000 years; one reconstruction even considers it the strongest of the last 2500 years. It is about eight times stronger than that of Krakatau. In the northern hemisphere it is only exceeded by the signal of the destructive 1783/1784 Laki eruption. The ice core sulfate spikes have been used as a time marker in chronostratigraphic studies. Ice cores from Illimani in Bolivia contain thallium and sulfate spikes from the eruption. For comparison, the 1991 eruption of Pinatubo ejected only about a tenth of the amount of sulfur erupted by Samalas. Sulfate deposition from the Samalas eruption has been noted at Svalbard, and the fallout of sulfuric acid from the volcano may have directly affected peatlands in northern Sweden.

In addition, the sulfate aerosols may have extracted large amounts of the beryllium isotope ^{10}Be from the stratosphere; such an extraction event and the subsequent deposition in ice cores may mimic changes in solar activity. The amount of sulfur dioxide released by the eruption has been estimated to be 158 ± 12 million tonnes. Whether the mass release was higher or lower than for Tambora is contentious; Tambora might have produced more or less sulfur than Samalas, or Samalas may have been more effective at injecting tephra into the stratosphere. After the eruption, it probably took weeks to months for the fallout to reach large distances from the volcano. When large scale volcanic eruptions inject aerosols into the atmosphere, they can form stratospheric veils. These reduce the amount of light reaching the surface and cause lower temperatures, which can lead to poor crop yields. Such sulfate aerosols in the case of the Samalas eruption may have remained at high concentrations for about three years according to findings in the Dome C ice core in Antarctica, although a smaller amount may have persisted for an additional time.

Other records of the eruption's impact include decreased tree growth in Mongolia between 1258 and 1262 based on tree ring data, frost rings (tree rings damaged by frost during the growth season), light tree rings in Canada, northwestern Siberia and Scandinavia, from 1258 and 1259 and 1258–1259, respectively, thin tree rings in the Sierra Nevada, California, U.S. cooling in sea surface temperature records off the Korean Peninsula and in lake sediments of northeastern China, a very wet monsoon in Vietnam, droughts in many places in the Northern Hemisphere as well as in southern Thailand cave records, (Note: Although the Thailand droughts appear to continue past the point where the effects of the Samalas aerosols should have ceased.) and a decade-long thinning of tree rings in Norway and Sweden. Cooling may have lasted for 4–5 years based on simulations and tree ring data.

Another effect of the eruption-induced climate change may have been a brief decrease in atmospheric carbon dioxide concentrations. A decrease in the growth rate of atmospheric carbon dioxide concentrations was recorded after the 1992 Pinatubo eruption; several mechanisms for volcanically driven decreases in atmospheric CO_{2} concentration have been proposed, including colder oceans absorbing extra CO_{2} and releasing less of it, decreased respiration rates leading to carbon accumulation in the biosphere, and increased productivity of the biosphere due to increased scattered sunlight and the fertilization of oceans by volcanic ash.

The Samalas signal is only inconsistently reported from tree ring climate information, and the temperature effects were likewise limited, probably because the large sulfate output altered the average size of particles and thus their radiative forcing. Climate modelling indicated that the Samalas eruption may have reduced global temperatures by approximately 2 °C (3.6 °F), a value largely not replicated by proxy data. Better modelling with a general circulation model that includes a detailed description of the aerosol indicated that the principal temperature anomaly occurred in 1258 and continued until 1261. Climate models tend to overestimate the climate impact of a volcanic eruption; one explanation is that climate models tend to assume that aerosol optical depth increases linearly with the quantity of erupted sulfur when in reality self-limiting processes limit its growth. The possible occurrence of an El Niño before the eruption may have further reduced the cooling, especially in Alaska.

The Samalas eruption, together with 14th-century cooling, is thought to have set off a growth of ice caps and sea ice, and glaciers in the Alps, Himalayas, the Pacific Northwest and the Patagonian Andes grew in size. The advances of ice after the Samalas eruption may have strengthened and prolonged the climate effects. Later volcanic activity in 1269, 1278, and 1286 and the effects of sea ice on the North Atlantic would have further contributed to ice expansion. The glacier advances triggered by the Samalas eruption are documented on Baffin Island, where the advancing ice killed and then incorporated vegetation, conserving it. Likewise, a change in Arctic Canada from a warm climate phase to a colder one coincides with the Samalas eruption.

=== Simulated effects ===
According to 2003 reconstructions, summer cooling reached 0.69 °C (1.24 °F) in the southern hemisphere and 0.46 °C (0.83 °F) in the northern hemisphere. More recent proxy data indicate that a temperature drop of 0.7 °C (1.3 °F) occurred in 1258 and of 1.2 °C (2.2 °F) in 1259, but with differences between various geographical areas. For comparison, the radiative forcing of Pinatubo's 1991 eruption was about a seventh of that of the Samalas eruption. Sea surface temperatures too decreased by 0.3–2.2 °C (0.54–3.96 °F), triggering changes in the ocean circulations. Ocean temperature and salinity changes may have lasted for a decade. Precipitation and evaporation both decreased, evaporation reduced more than precipitation.

Volcanic eruptions can also deliver bromine and chlorine into the stratosphere, where they contribute to the breakdown of ozone through their oxides chlorine monoxide and bromine monoxide. While most bromine and chlorine erupted would have been scavenged by the eruption column and thus would not have entered the stratosphere, the quantities that have been modelled for the Samalas halogen release (227 ± 18 million tonnes of chlorine and up to 1.3 ± 0.3 million tonnes of bromine) would have reduced stratospheric ozone< although only a small portion of the halogens would have reached the stratosphere. One hypothesis is that the resulting increase in ultraviolet radiation on the surface of Earth may have led to widespread immunosuppression in human populations, explaining the onset of epidemics in the years following the eruption.

=== Climate effects in various areas ===
Samalas, along with the 1452/1453 mystery eruption and the 1815 eruption of Mount Tambora, was one of the strongest cooling events in the last millennium, even more so than at the peak of the Little Ice Age. After an early warm winter 1257–1258 (Note: Winter warming is frequently observed after tropical volcanic eruptions, due to dynamic effects triggered by the sulfate aerosols.) resulting in the early flowering of violets according to reports from the Kingdom of France, European summers were colder after the eruption, and winters were long and cold.

The Samalas eruption came after the Medieval Climate Anomaly, a period early in the last millennium with unusually warm temperatures, and at a time when a period of climate stability was ending, with earlier eruptions in 1108, 1171, and 1230 already having upset global climate. Subsequent time periods displayed increased volcanic activity until the early 20th century. The time period 1250–1300 was heavily disturbed by volcanic activity from four eruptions in 1230, 1257, 1276 and 1286, and is recorded by a moraine from a glacial advance on Disko Island, although the moraine may indicate a pre-Samalas cold spell. These volcanic disturbances along with positive feedback effects from increased ice may have started the Little Ice Age (Note: The Little Ice Age was a period of several centuries during the last millennium during which global temperatures were depressed; the cooling was associated with volcanic eruptions.) even without the need for changes in solar radiation, though this theory is not without disagreement. The Samalas eruption in Europe is sometimes used as a chronological marker for the beginning of the Little Ice Age.

Other inferred effects of the eruption are:

- The most negative Southern Annular Mode excursion of the last millennium. The Southern Annular Mode is a climatic phenomenon in the Southern Hemisphere that governs rainfall and temperatures there and is usually fairly insensitive towards external factors such as volcanic eruptions, greenhouse gases and the effects of insolation variations.
- Effects of volcanic eruptions on the El Niño-Southern Oscillation have been debated. Onset of El Niño conditions during a climate period where La Niña was more common, as the eruption may have induced a moderate to strong El Niño event. Climate proxies such as a wet year in the Western United States endorse the occurrence of an El Niño event in the year after the Samalas eruption, while temperature records from corals at Palmyra Atoll indicate that no El Niño was triggered.
- A short-term decrease of the intensity of tropical cyclones caused by a change of the atmospheric temperature structure. Paleotempestology research in the Atlantic however suggests that the effect of the 13th century volcanic eruptions may have been to redistribute the occurrence of hurricanes rather than reducing their frequency.
- Changes in the Atlantic subpolar circulation and a weakening of the Atlantic meridional overturning circulation which lasted long after the eruption, possibly aiding in the onset of the Little Ice Age as well.
- A sea level drop in the Crusader states of about 0.5 m (1 ft 8 in), perhaps associated with the North Atlantic Oscillation and the Southern Oscillation. Global sea level declined after the Samalas eruption, followed by a recovery between 1250 and 1400.
- A modification of the North Atlantic oscillation, causing it to first acquire positive and later, in the subsequent decades, more negative values. A beginning decrease in solar activity as part of the Wolf minimum in the solar cycle contributed to the later decline.
- A stronger East Asian winter monsoon, leading to colder sea surface temperatures in the Okinawa Trough.
- A brief but noticeable excitation in the climate pattern known as the "Pacific Meridional Mode".
- A decline in moisture availability in Europe.
- Warmer winters in the Northern Hemisphere continents owing to changes in the polar vortex and the Arctic Oscillation.
- Anomalies in δ^{18}O (Note: δ^{18}O is the ratio of the oxygen-18 isotope to the more common oxygen-16 isotope in water, which is influenced by climate.) patterns around the world.
- Changes in the terrestrial carbon cycle.
- The onset of Bond event 0 and a southward shift of the Intertropical Convergence Zone that led to changes in precipitation patterns in India.
- A notable weakening of the Indian Summer Monsoon and of atmospheric pressure gradients in the eastern Mediterranean, causing a shutdown of the summertime Etesian winds over Greece.
- An abrupt onset of cooling phase of the Atlantic Multidecadal Variability.

Other regions such as Alaska were mostly unaffected. There is little evidence that tree growth was influenced by cold in what is now the Western United States, where the eruption may have interrupted a prolonged drought period. The climate effect in Alaska may have been moderated by the nearby ocean. In 1259, Western Europe and the west coastal North America had mild weather and there is no evidence for summer precipitation changes in Central Europe. Tree rings do not show much evidence of precipitation changes.

== Social and historical consequences ==
The eruption led to global disaster in 1257–1258. Very large volcanic eruptions can cause significant human hardship, including famine, away from the volcano due to their effect on climate. The social effects are often reduced by the resilience of humans; thus there is often uncertainty about causal links between volcano-induced climate variations and societal changes at the same time.

=== Lombok Kingdom and Bali (Indonesia) ===
Western and central Indonesia at the time were divided into competing kingdoms that often built temple complexes with inscriptions documenting historical events. However, little direct historical evidence of the consequences of the Samalas eruption exists. The Babad Lombok describe how villages on Lombok were destroyed during the mid-13th century by ash, gas and lava flows, and two additional documents known as the Babad Sembalun and Babad Suwung may also reference the eruption. (Note: The term Babad refers to Javanese and Balinese chronicles. These babads are not original works but recompilations of older works that were presumably written around the 14th century.) They are also—together with other texts—the source of the name "Samalas" while the name "Suwung"—"quiet and without life"—may, in turn, be a reference to the aftermath of the eruption.

Mount Rinjani avalanched and Mount Samalas collapsed, followed by large flows of debris accompanied by the noise coming from boulders. These flows destroyed Pamatan. All houses were destroyed and swept away, floating on the sea, and many people died. During seven days, big earthquakes shook the Earth, stranded in Leneng, dragged by the boulder flows, People escaped and some of them climbed the hills. (Note: Original (transliterated): "Gunung Renjani kularat, miwah Gunung Samalas rakrak, balabur watu gumuruh, tibeng desa Pamatan, yata kanyut bale halang parubuh, kurambangning sagara, wong ngipun halong kang mati. Pitung dina lami nira, gentuh hiku hangebeki pertiwi, hing Leneng hadampar, hanerus maring batu dendeng kang hanyut, wong ngipun kabeh hing paliya, saweneh munggah hing ngukir.")

— Babad Lombok

The city of Pamatan, capital of a kingdom on Lombok, was destroyed, and both disappeared from the historical record. The royal family survived the disaster according to the Javanese text, which also mentions successful reconstruction and recovery efforts after the eruption, and there is no clear-cut evidence that the kingdom itself was destroyed by the eruption, as the history there is poorly known in general. Thousands of people died, although it is possible that the population of Lombok fled before the eruption. In Bali the number of inscriptions (Note: And on Lombok, the historical record of the Sasak people.) dropped off after the eruption, and Bali and Lombok may have been depopulated by it, possibly for generations, allowing King Kertanegara of Singhasari on Java to conquer Bali in 1284 with little resistance. It might have taken about a century for Lombok to recover from the eruption. The Babad Suwung reports destruction on the western coast of Sumbawa, which was depopulated and remains so to this day; presumably the local populace viewed the area devastated by the eruption as "forbidden" and this memory persisted until recent times.

=== Oceania and New Zealand ===
Historical events in Oceania are usually poorly dated, making it difficult to assess the timing and role of specific events, but there is evidence that between 1250 and 1300 there were crises in Oceania, for example at Easter Island, which may be linked with the beginning of the Little Ice Age and the Samalas eruption. Around 1300, settlements in many places of the Pacific relocated, perhaps because of a sea level drop that occurred after 1250, and the 1991 eruption of Pinatubo has been linked to small drops in sea level.

Climate change triggered by the Samalas eruption and the beginning of the Little Ice Age may have led to people in Polynesia migrating southwestward in the 13th century. The first settlement of New Zealand most likely occurred 1230–1280 AD and the arrival of people there and on other islands in the region may reflect such a climate-induced migration. However, the climate history of the Southern Hemisphere is poorly known, and thus linking Samalas to specific events impossible.

=== Europe, Near East and Middle East ===
Contemporary chronicles in Europe mention unusual weather conditions in 1258. Reports from 1258 in France and England indicate a dry fog, giving the impression of a persistent cloud cover to contemporary observers. Medieval chronicles say that in 1258, the summer was cold and rainy, causing floods and bad harvests, with cold from February to June. Frost and snow fell during summer 1259 in Russia, according to chronicles. In Europe and the Middle East, changes in atmospheric colours, storms, cold, and severe weather were reported in 1258–1259, with agricultural problems extending to North Africa. In Europe, excess rain, cold and high cloudiness damaged crops and caused famines followed by epidemics, although 1258–1259 did not lead to famines as bad as some other famines such as the Great Famine of 1315–17.

The price for cereal increased in Britain, France, and Italy, augmented by price speculation. Outbreaks of disease occurred during this time in the Middle East, England and Italy, including typhus. During and after the winter of 1258–59, exceptional weather was reported less commonly, but the winter of 1260–61 was very severe in Iceland, Italy, and elsewhere. The disruption caused by the eruption may have influenced the onset of the Mudéjar revolt of 1264–1266 in Iberia. Iceland and Scandinavia were plagued by cold, bad shipping conditions at sea and lack of food in 1258–1261, prompting Haakon IV of Norway to take legal and political measures to maintain tax revenue and prevent the flight of peasants from rural areas, and the union between Norway and Iceland that took place during that time may have been influenced by the crisis situation.

==== England and Italy ====
Swollen and rotting in groups of five or six, the dead lay abandoned in pigsties, on dunghills, and in the muddy streets.

— Matthew Paris, chronicler of St. Albans

A famine in London has been linked to this event; this food crisis was not extraordinary and there were issues with harvests already before the eruption. The famine occurred at a time of political crisis between King Henry III of England and the English magnates. Witnesses reported a death toll of 15,000 to 20,000 in London. A mass burial of famine victims was found in the 1990s in the centre of London. Matthew Paris of St Albans described how until mid-August 1258, the weather alternated between cold and strong rain, causing high mortality. The resulting famine was severe enough that grain was imported from Germany and Holland.

In Italy, bad weather including intense rains in 1258 caused crop failures throughout the peninsula, as documented by numerous chronicles, although impacts varied between regions. Relative to most of Europe, the impact in Italy hit a year later. In 1259, a cold wave led to high mortality throughout Italy. The cities of Bologna and Siena in Italy attempted to manage the food crisis by buying and subsidizing grain, banning its export and limiting its price. Siena also initiated diplomatic relations with Manfred, King of Sicily, ostensibly to help manage the food crisis, while a political crisis arose in Bologna, which was also weakened geopolitically. Parma ordered the sale of grain and tasked officials with monitoring markets, including closing them on Saturdays, and banned food exports. It is likely that the overthrow of the podestá (lord) of Parma Giberto da Gente in 1259 was facilitated by the crisis, which induced his supporters to remain passive. In Pavia, where a political crisis was already underway in 1257, various economical and police measures were taken during the following two years to secure food supplies. The city of Como in northern Italy repaired river banks that had been damaged by flooding, and acquired grain for its consumption. In Perugia, there were three years of food crisis between 1257 and 1260, and the question of food supply played a major role in city politics and drove increased social control. Perugia is also where the Flagellant movement arose; it may have originated in the social distress caused by the effects of the eruption, though warfare and other causes probably played a more important role than natural events.

==== Long-term consequences in Europe and the Near East ====
Over the long term, the cooling of the North Atlantic and sea ice expansion therein may have impacted the societies of Greenland and Iceland by restraining navigation and agriculture, perhaps allowing further climate shocks around 1425 to end the existence of the Norse settlement in Greenland. Another possible longer-term consequence of the eruption was the Byzantine Empire's loss of control over western Anatolia, because of a shift in political power from Byzantine farmers to mostly Turkoman pastoralists in the area. Colder winters caused by the eruption would have impacted agriculture more severely than pastoralism.

=== Four Corners region, North America ===
The 1257 Samalas eruption took place during the Pueblo III Period in southwestern North America, during which the Mesa Verde region on the San Juan River was the site of the so-called cliff dwellings. Several sites were abandoned after the eruption. The eruption took place during a time of decreased precipitation and lower temperatures and when population was declining. The Samalas eruption was one among several eruptions during this period which may have triggered climate stresses such as a colder climate, which in turn caused strife within the society of the Ancestral Puebloans; possibly they left the northern Colorado Plateau as a consequence.

=== Altiplano, South America ===
In the Altiplano of South America, a cold and dry interval between 1200 and 1450 has been associated with the Samalas eruption and the 1280 eruption of Quilotoa volcano in Ecuador. The use of rain-fed agriculture increased in the area between the Salar de Uyuni and the Salar de Coipasa despite the climatic change, implying that the local population effectively coped with the effects of the eruption.

=== East Asia ===
Problems were also recorded in China, Japan, and Korea. In Japan, the Azuma Kagami chronicle mentions that rice paddies and gardens were destroyed by the cold and wet weather, and the so-called Shōga famine – which among other things stimulated the Japanese religious reformer Nichiren – may have been aggravated by bad weather in 1258 and 1259. Along with the Mongol invasions of Korea, hardship caused by the Samalas eruption may have precipitated the downfall of the Goryeo military regime and of its last Choe dictator, Ch'oe Ui. Monsoon anomalies triggered by the Samalas eruption may have also impacted Angkor Wat in present-day Cambodia, which suffered a population decline at that time. Other possible effects of the eruption were peculiar colours of the sky and sunset, including a total darkening of the Moon in May 1258 during a lunar eclipse, a phenomenon also recorded from Europe; volcanic aerosols reduced the amount of sunlight scattered into Earth's shadow and thus the brightness of the eclipsed Moon.

==== Mongol Empire ====
Increased precipitation triggered by the eruption may have facilitated the Mongol invasions of the Levant but later the return of the pre-Samalas climate would have reduced the livestock capacity of the region, thus reducing their military effectiveness and paving the way to their military defeat in the Battle of Ain Jalut. The effects of the eruption, such as famines, droughts and epidemics may also have hastened the decline of the Mongol Empire, although the volcanic event is unlikely to have been the sole cause. It may have altered the outcome of the Toluid Civil War and shifted its centre of power towards the Chinese part dominated by Kublai Khan which was more adapted to cold winter conditions.

=== Central Asia and the Black Death ===
The eruption of Samalas and other volcanoes caused climate disturbances in Central Asia, including a cooling which was followed by a warming. This warming may have provided the environmental conditions for the spread of Yersinia pestis, the causative agent of the plague, although its diversification in the Tian Shan had begun earlier in the 13th century. Human populations may have been weakened by volcanic cooling-induced food crises and political/military unrest, facilitating the establishment of the outbreak.

== See also ==
- List of volcanoes in Indonesia
- Massive explosive eruptions
