= Barujari cone =

Volcano in Lombok, Indonesia

Barujari
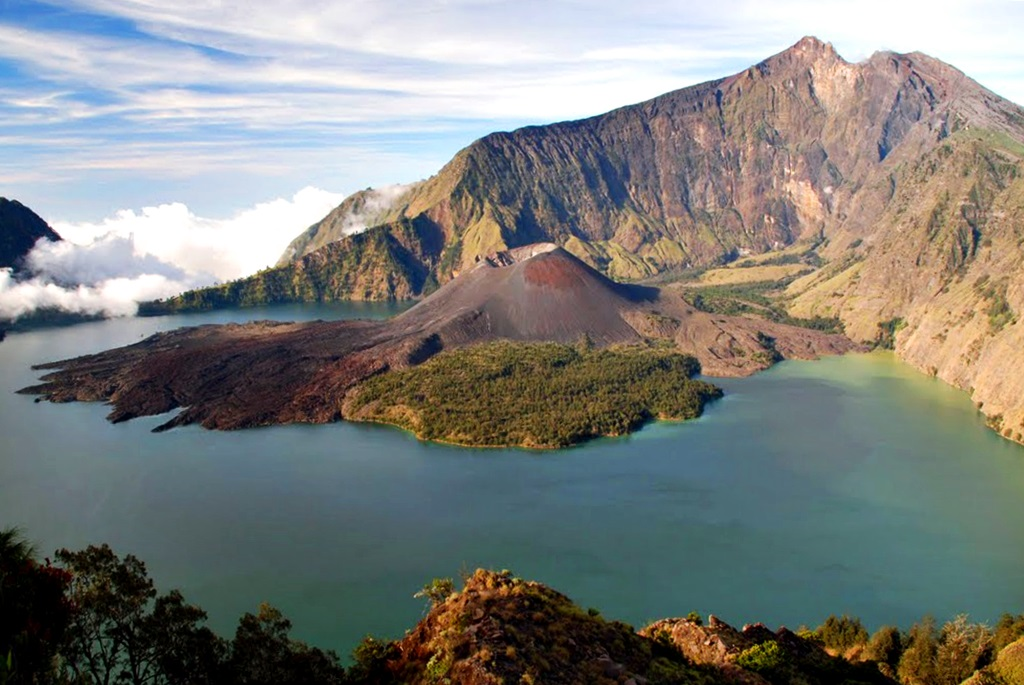

Highest point
- Elevation: 2,376 m (7,795 ft)
- Listing: N/A
- Coordinates: 8°24′41″S 116°25′21″E

Geography
- Location within Java Location within Indonesia
- Location: Lesser Sunda Islands, Indonesia

Geology
- Rock age: March 28 1966
- Mountain type: Cinder cone
- Volcanic zone: Ring of Fire
- Volcanic arc: Sunda Arc
- Last eruption: 2015

Climbing
- First ascent: Unknown
- Easiest route: Hike

Barujari cone (Gunung Barujari) is an active volcano on the island of Lombok in Indonesia. A "baby volcano", it is inside the Mount Rinjani volcano. The cone initially erupted in 1966 and continued to grow rapidly.

Mount Rinjani's caldera formed in an explosive eruption in 1257. The Barujari cone is at the eastern end of Lake Segara Anak. It erupted in September 2014, leading to an evacuations of a few hundred tourists visiting the mountain. In November 2024, flights to Bali were cancelled due to ash spewing from the Barujari.

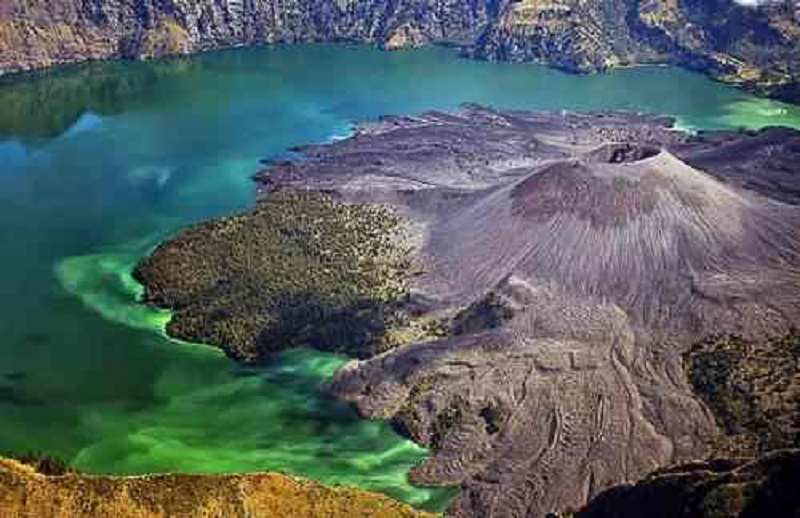

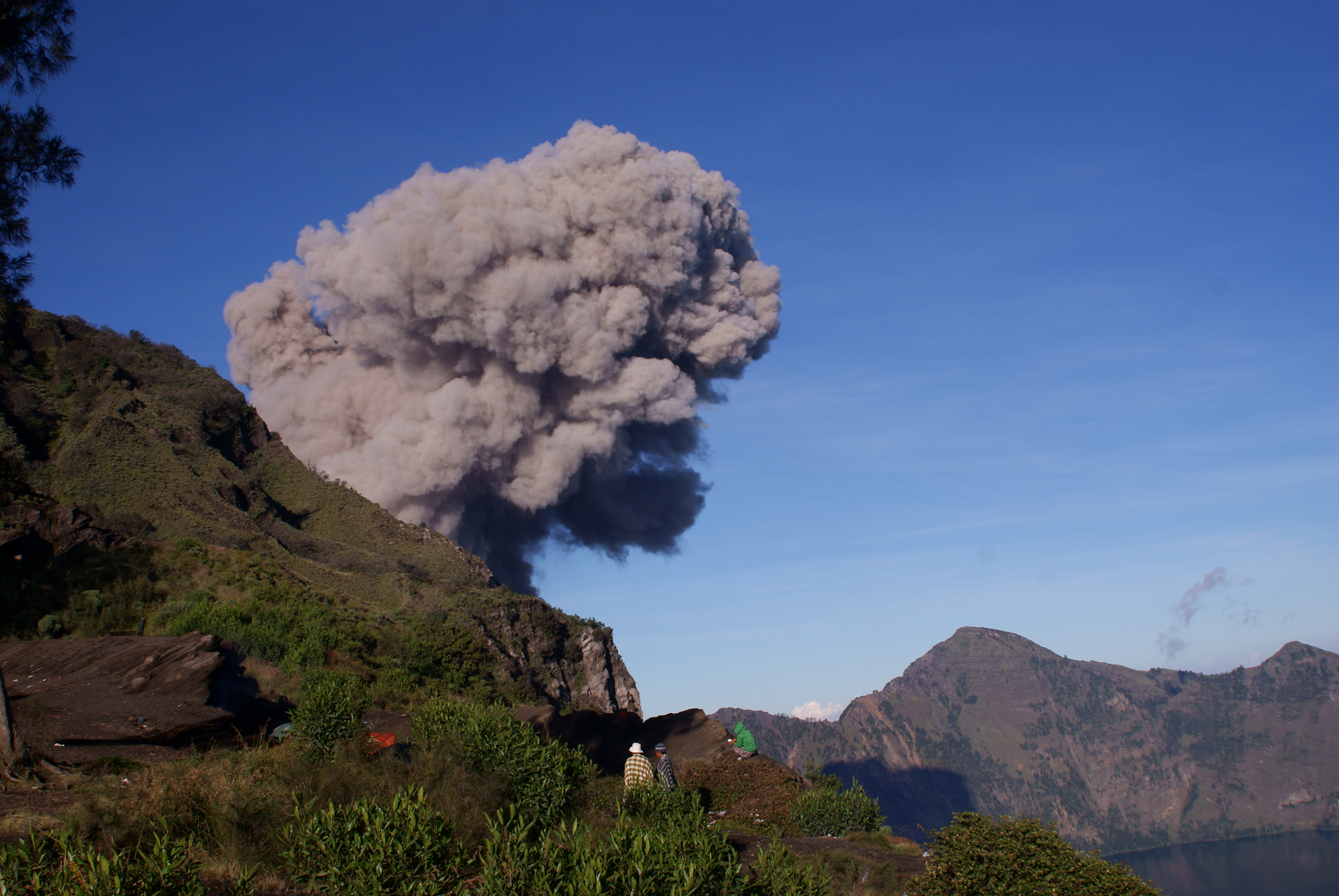

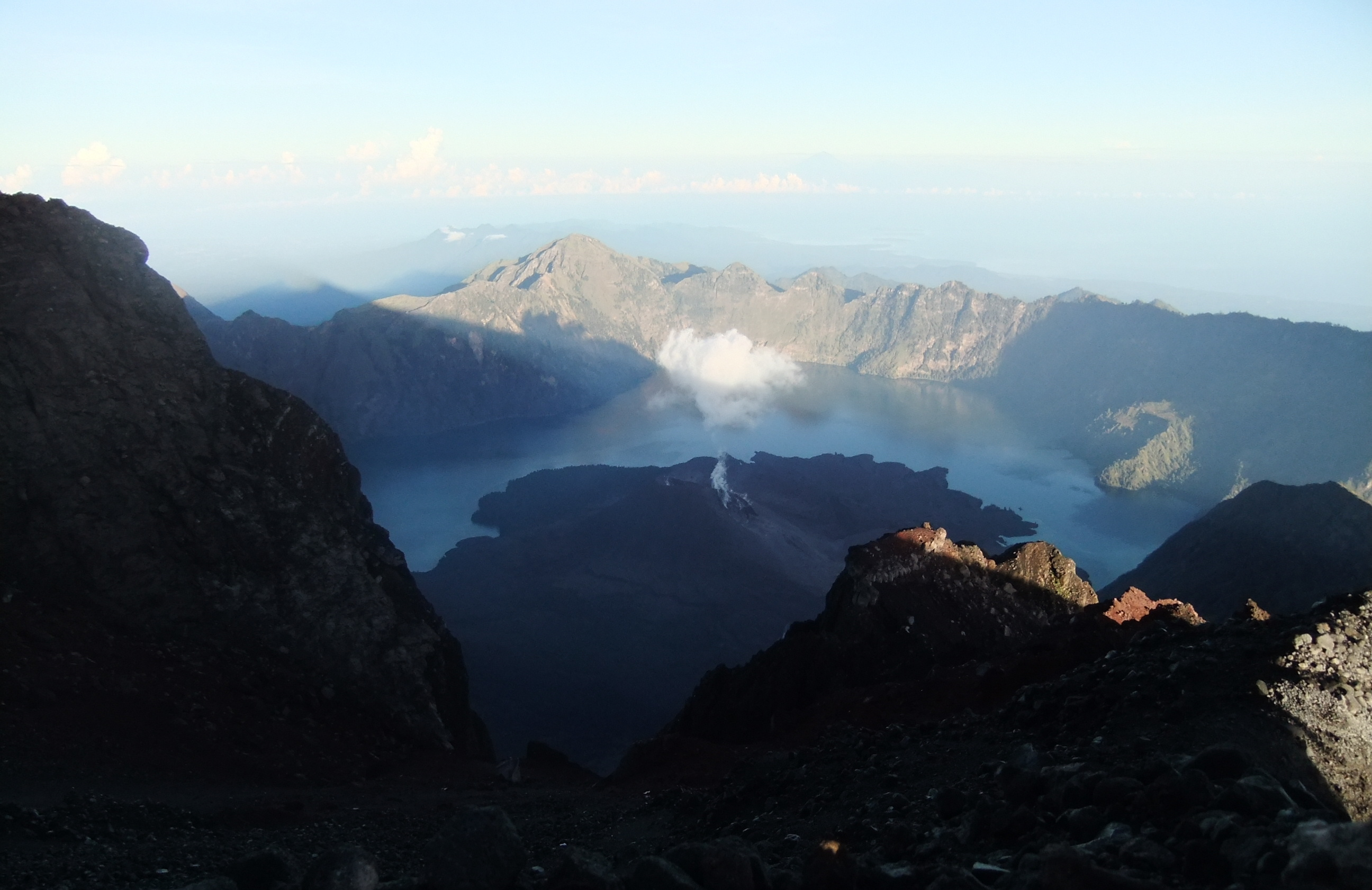
View from the summit of Mount Rinjani

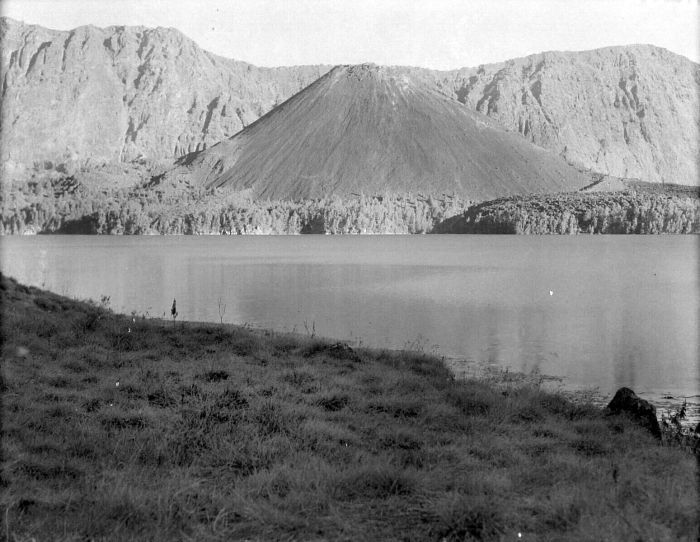
1930s photograph
