= Dispersal index =

Indicator of spread of volcanic ejecta

Dispersal index is a parameter in volcanology. The dispersal index $D$ was defined by George P. L. Walker in 1973 as the surface area covered by an ash or tephra fall, where the thickness is equal or more than 1/100 of the thickness of the fall at the vent. An eruption with a low dispersal index leaves most of its products close to the vent, forming a cone; an eruption with a high dispersal index forms thinner sheet-like deposits which extends to larger distances from the vent. A dispersal index of 500 square kilometres (190 sq mi) or more of coarse pumice is one proposed definition of a Plinian eruption. Likewise, a dispersal index of 50,000 square kilometres (19,000 sq mi) has been proposed as a cutoff for an ultraplinian eruption. The definition of 1/100 of the near-vent thickness was partially dictated by the fact that most tephra deposits are not well preserved at larger distances.

Originally, the dispersal index was considered a function of the height of the eruption column. Later, a role for the size of the tephra and ash particles was identified, with coarser fall deposits covering smaller surfaces than finer deposits generated by a column of the same height. For example, a deposit with a dispersal index of 500 square kilometres (190 sq mi) can be formed by a column with heights of 14–18 square kilometres (5.4–6.9 sq mi). Thus, Walker's idea of the column height alone separating a cone forming eruption and an eruption generating a sheet-like deposit was later considered oversimplified. An additional complicating factor is that fine particles are prone to aggregating and thus falling out more quickly from the column. Further problems arise when the maximum thickness has to be determined.

The height of the eruption column, the presence and behaviour of water, the speed and direction of the wind as well as the sizes of the various tephra particles influence the fallout patterns of an ash cloud.

The dispersal index for volcanic eruptions ranges from <1 square kilometre (0.39 sq mi) and 1–1,000 square kilometres (0.39–386.10 sq mi). A number of basaltic phreatomagmatic deposits, frequently associated with tuff rings, have a dispersal index of less than 50 square kilometres (19 sq mi).

Volcano	Eruption	Age	Dispersal index	Source
Taupō	Hatepe eruption	1820 BP	100,000 square kilometres (39,000 sq mi)	
Taupō	Oruanui eruption	~20000 BP	>100,000 square kilometres (39,000 sq mi)	
Taupō	Hinemaiaia tephra	4500 years ago	40,000 square kilometres (15,000 sq mi)	
Kelut		1990	2,000 square kilometres (770 sq mi)	
Rinjani	1257 Samalas eruption, P1 phase	1257	7,500 square kilometres (2,900 sq mi)	
Rinjani	1257 Samalas eruption, P3 phase	1257	110,500 square kilometres (42,700 sq mi)	
Mount Pelée	P1 eruption	650 BP	900 square kilometres (350 sq mi)	
Mount Pelée	P2 eruption	1670 BP	800 square kilometres (310 sq mi)	
Mount Pelée	P3 eruption	2010 BP	1,000 square kilometres (390 sq mi)	
Rabaul	Vulcan	1937	40 square kilometres (15 sq mi)	
Okataina Volcanic Complex	Whakatane tephra	~ 5500 BP	~200,000 square kilometres (77,000 sq mi)	
Agua de Pau	Fogo A	5000 BP	1,500 square kilometres (580 sq mi)	
Hekla		1991	460 square kilometres (180 sq mi)	
Sakurajima	Taisho	1914	539 square kilometres (208 sq mi)	
Mono Craters		4th century AD	1,800 square kilometres (690 sq mi)	

A related measure is the thickness half-distance $b_t$, which defines the distance over which the thickness of a deposit halves. These values are related with each other over $D=\frac{\pi b_t^2 ln(0.01)^2} {ln(0.5)^2}$ for circular deposits.
