= Pamatan =

City in Indonesia, destroyed and lost

Pamatan is the name of a lost city on Lombok Island in Indonesia and the capital of the principal kingdom on Lombok. The city was destroyed by the 1257 Samalas eruption; while the king and at least part of his family survived, many inhabitants were killed. The location of the city is unclear but probably was on the eastern coast of Lombok.

The history of Pamatan and the 1257 eruption of Samalas is recorded in the Babad Lombok, a compilation of historical writings and possibly oral tradition written in the Old Javanese language on palm leaves. According to the Babad Lombok, Pamatan was founded at the foot of Samalas-Rinjani after a previous (probably legendary) city had been abandoned. It is likely that the city was located on the sea, most likely on the eastern side of Lombok; possible locations are at Aikmel and Sembalun. The Babad Lombok says that the city had a population of about 10,000 people and featured city walls, town halls, houses, and boulevards. Its inhabitants were wealthy and active in agriculture, fishing, and trade. The city was the capital of a kingdom; at the time, Lombok had multiple kingdoms, of which Pamatan was the most important.

When Samalas erupted in 1257, the city was destroyed; pyroclastic flows swept the houses away and partially into the sea. The Babad Lombok states that there were numerous casualties, but other inhabitants, including part of the royal family, escaped and moved to villages and towns that had survived the eruption. People took refuge on hills and mountains which were spared by pyroclastic flows. Others escaped by boats over sea. Reportedly, the king and his family survived the eruption, but the city disappeared from history and its location was lost; if it were to be rediscovered, it may become a "Pompeii of the East".

According to the Babad Lombok, after the eruption new settlements were built by survivors. There is, as of 2022, little archeological evidence with which to corroborate its narrative. It is likely that Lombok was devastated by the eruption, facilitating its conquest from Bali in 1284. If rediscovered, Pamatan may offer clues on how societies respond to volcanic catastrophes. Contemporary historical records give indications but they cannot be verified archeologically.
