= Lake Segara Anak =

Crater lake in Indonesia

Segara Anak
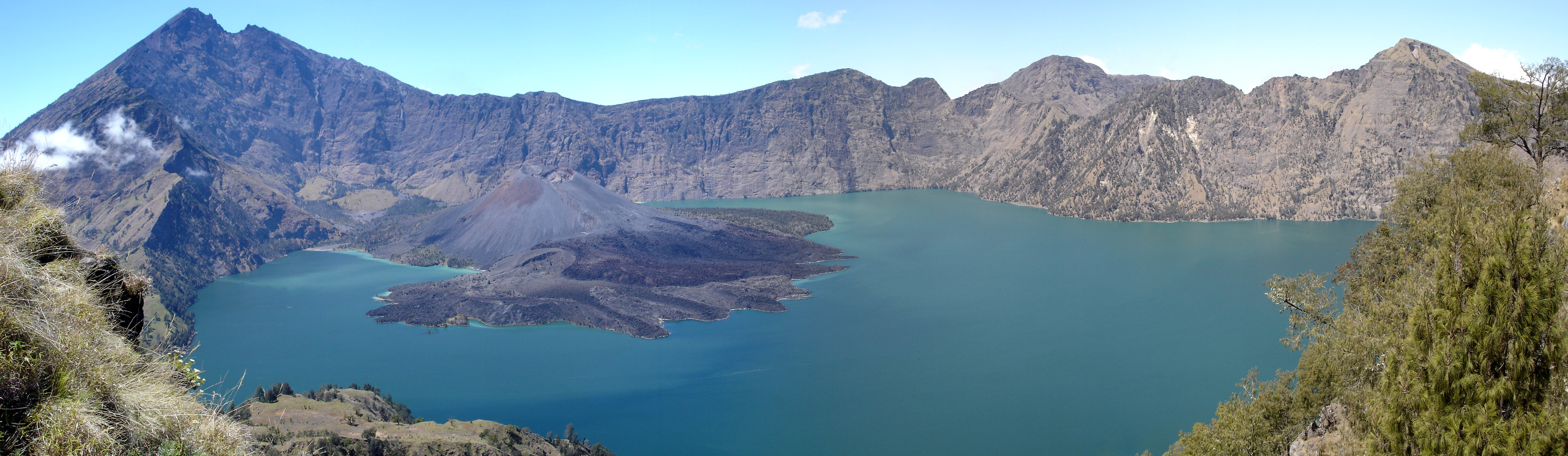

- Location within Indonesia
- Location: Lombok Island
- Coordinates: 8°24′20″S 116°23′50″E
- Lake type: Crater lake
- Basin countries: Indonesia
- Surface area: 11.3 km^{2} (4.4 sq mi)
- Max. depth: 230 m (750 ft)
- Water volume: 36×10^{6} m^{3} (1.3×10^{9} cu ft)
- Surface elevation: 2,004 m (6,575 ft)

Segara Anak is a crater lake in the caldera that formed during the explosive volcanic eruption of Mount Samalas in 1257. The caldera is next to Mount Rinjani on Lombok Island in Indonesia. "Segara Anak" means "child of the sea" and refers to the blue lake's resemblance to the sea. The volcanic cone Gunung Barujari is at the eastern end of the lake and is responsible for its crescent shape. Because magma flows beneath the lakebed, the water temperature is 20–22 °C (68–72 °F), 5–7 °C (9.0–12.6 °F) higher than normal for a lake at this altitude. Gas bubbles escape from the lakebed, helping the lake to have a pH of 7–8.

The surface of Segara Anak is 2,004 metres (6,575 ft) above mean sea level (AMSL) and is Indonesia's second-highest caldera lake with an active volcano. The peak of Gunung Baru Jari is 2,376 metres (7,795 ft) AMSL. The lake covers 45 square kilometres (17 sq mi), with dimensions of 7.5 by 6.0 kilometres (4.7 by 3.7 mi), and has a maximum depth of 230 metres (750 ft).

== Fish breeding ==
There were no fish in Segara Anak. In 1969, volcanologists from the Geological Society of London examined the lake and recommended the cultivation of fish. In 1985, the Nusa Tenggara Barat provincial government began breeding fish in the lake. The fish bred rapidly and the lake became home to millions of tilapia and carp. Segara Anak is today a popular spot for fishing, and some locals make a living from this.

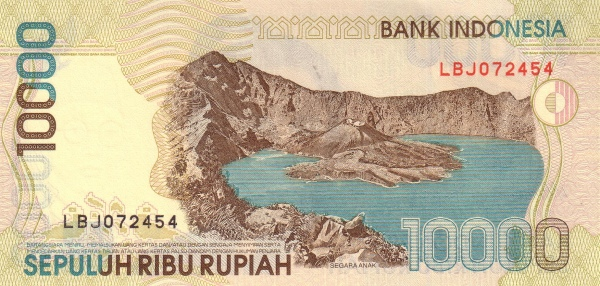
Lake Segara Anak featured in 10,000-rupiah banknote

== Mount Samalas ==
The estimated height of Mount Samalas before its 1257 eruption was 4,200 metres (13,800 ft). According to a 2013 study, the eruption destroyed the mountain by ejecting up to 10 cubic miles (42 km^{3}) of Dense rock equivalent or 200 cubic kilometres (48 cu mi) of rock into the atmosphere. The eruption was one of the largest during the last few thousand years, with a probable Volcanic Explosivity Index of 7. The eruption may have been the cause of decreased global temperatures for a few years and may have even been a triggering factor for the Little Ice Age.

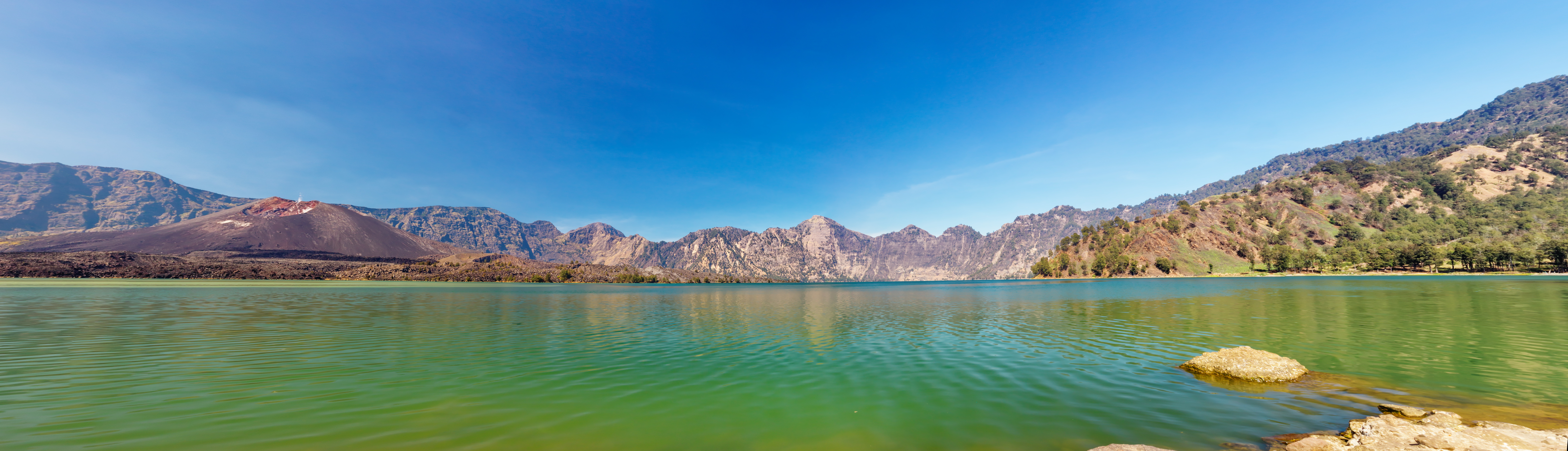
Segara Anak in Panoramic View

== See also ==
- List of drainage basins of Indonesia
