= Mount Rinjani =

Active volcano in Lombok, Indonesia

- Mount Barujari
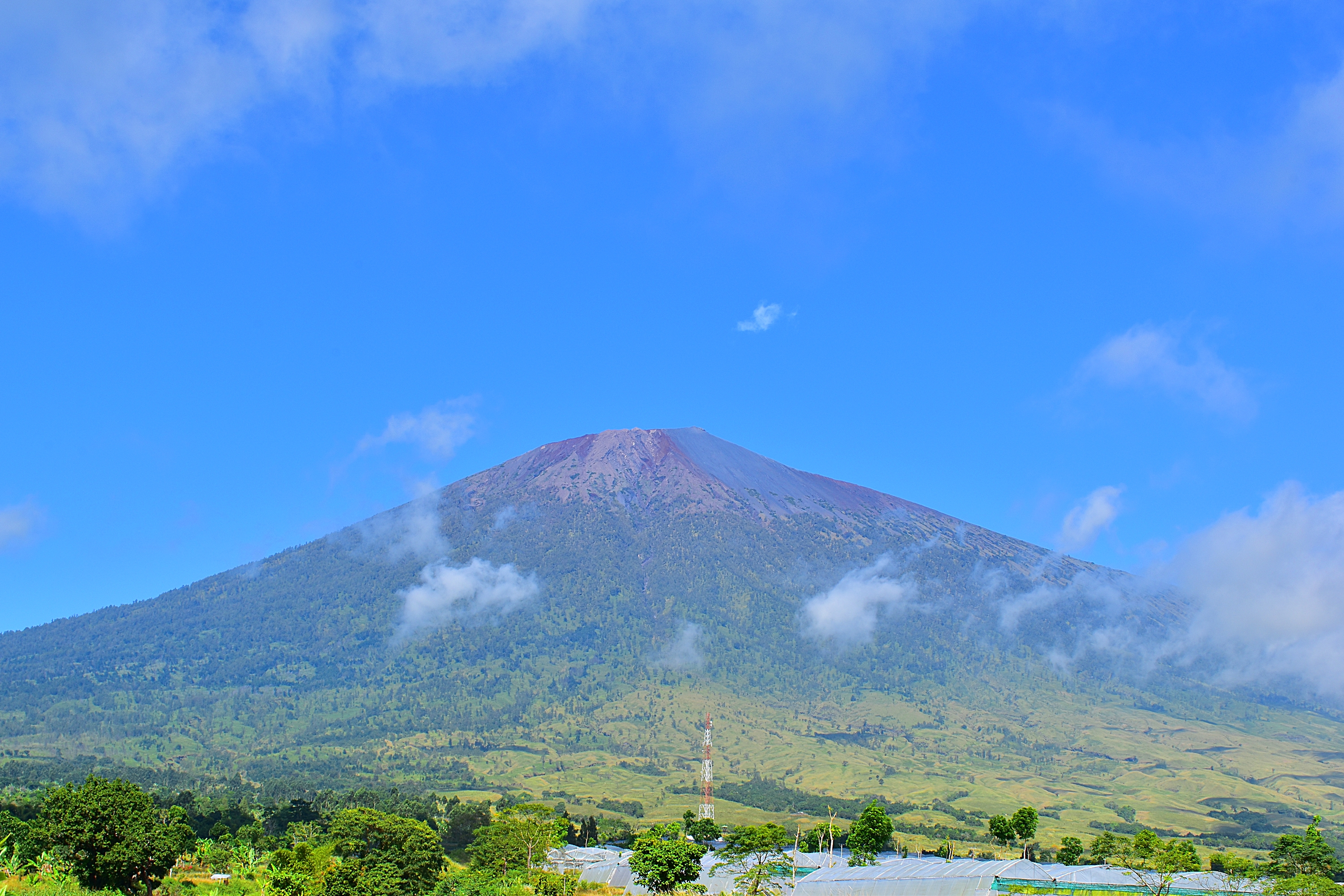

Highest point
- Elevation: 3,726 m (12,224 ft)
- Prominence: 3,726 m (12,224 ft); Ranked 38th
- Listing: Island high point 8th Ultra; Ribu
- Coordinates: 8°24′52″S 116°27′35″E

Naming
- Native name: gunong Rinjani (Sasak)

Geography
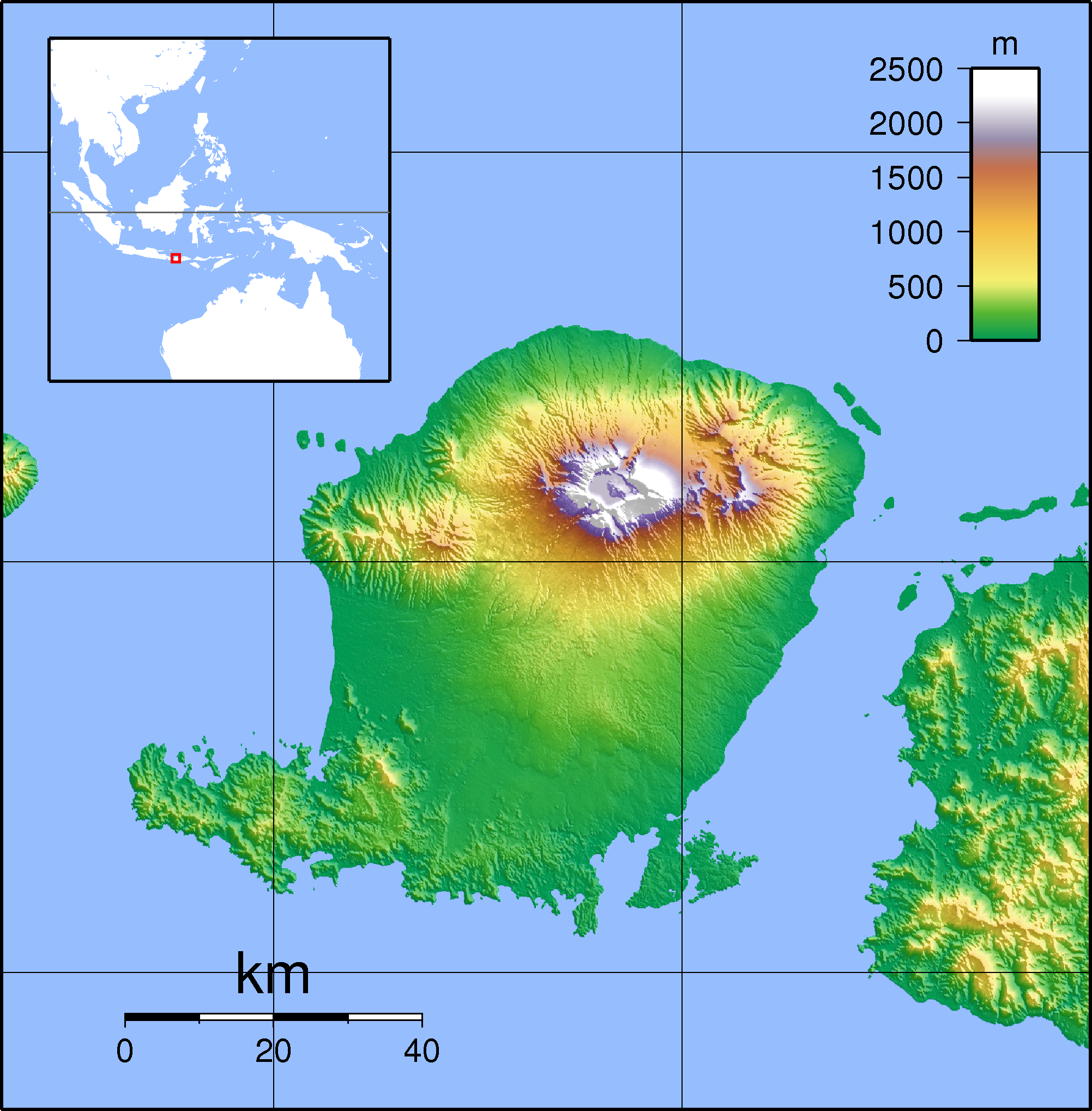
- Location within Lombok
- Location: Gunung Rinjani National Park; Lombok, Indonesia
- Parent range: Lesser Sunda Islands

Geology
- Rock age: Late Mesozoic
- Mountain type: Somma
- Volcanic arc: Sunda Arc
- Last eruption: 14:45, 27 September 2016 (+08:00)

Climbing
- Easiest route: Senaru
- Normal route: Sembalun
- Access: Restricted

Mount Rinjani (Indonesian: Gunung Rinjani; Sasak: ᬕᬸᬦ᭄ᬗᬸᬂ᭞ᬭᬶᬦ᭄ᬚᬦᬶ, romanized: gunong rinjani) is an active stratovolcano situated in regencial North Lombok of West Nusa Tenggara province on the Indonesian island of Lombok. It reaches an elevation of 3,726 metres (12,224 ft), making it the second-highest volcano in Indonesia and the highest point in the province of West Nusa Tenggara.

Adjacent to the volcano is a caldera measuring approximately 6-by-8.5-kilometre (3.7 by 5.3 mi), which contains the crater lake Sagara Anak (lit. 'Child of the Sea' (in Sasak)) — named for its striking blue coloration reminiscent of the ocean. The lake lies at an elevation of around 2,000 metres (6,600 ft) above sea level and is estimated to be about 200 metres (660 ft) deep. The caldera also features several hot springs.

Mount Rinjani and its crater lake hold significant spiritual importance for the indigenous Sasak people and certain folk religious communities, serving as sites for various religious ceremonies. In April 2018, the United Nations Educational, Scientific and Cultural Organization (UNESCO) recognized the Mount Rinjani Caldera as part of the Global Geoparks Network. Notably, the volcano's eruption in 1257 is considered one of the most powerful global volcanic events of the last 2,000 years.

== Geography ==
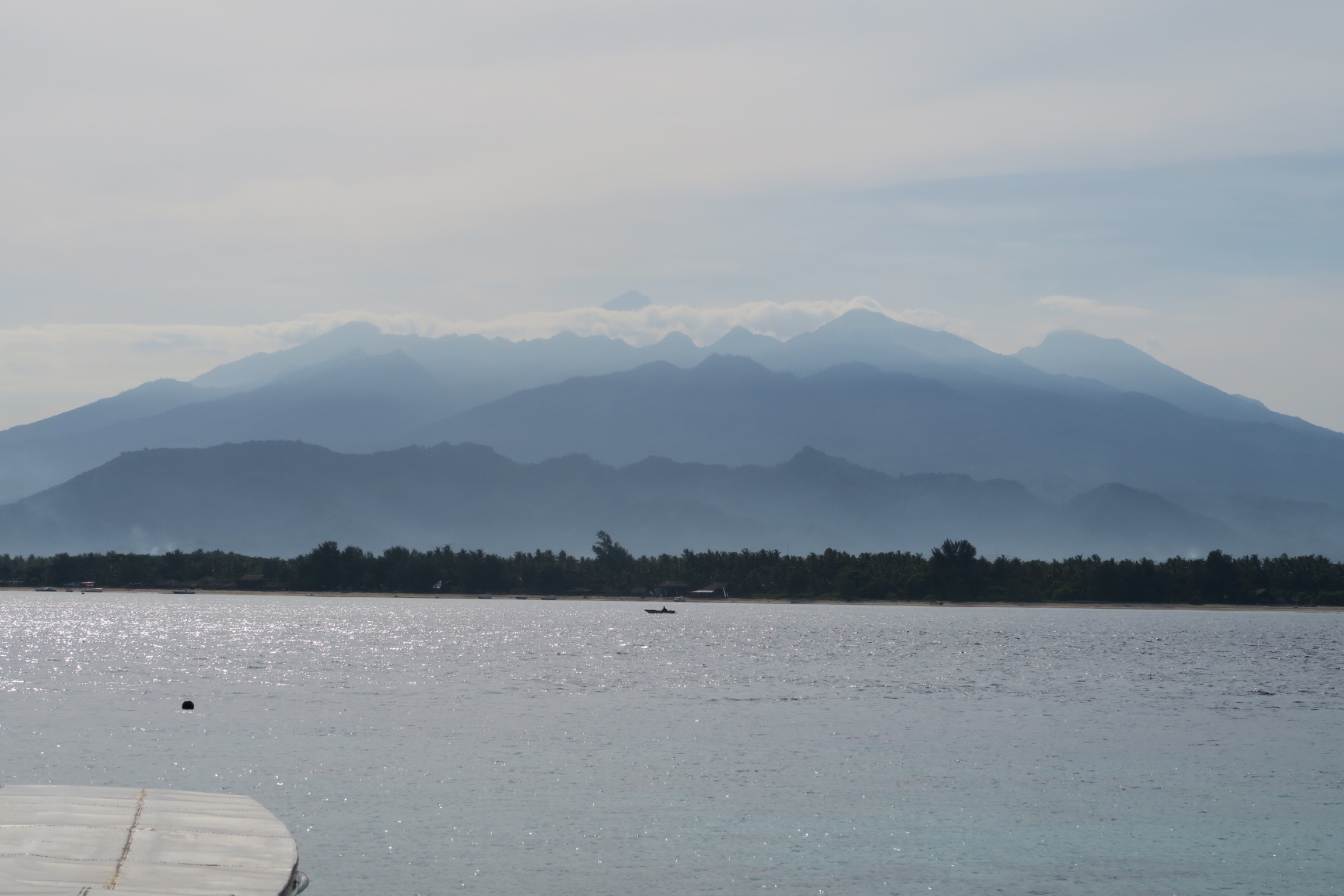
Mount Rinjani seen from Gili Meno

Lombok is one of the Lesser Sunda Islands, a small archipelago which, from west to east, consists of Bali, Lombok, Sumbawa, Flores, Sumba and the Timor islands; all are located at the edge of the Australian continental shelf. Volcanoes in the area are formed due to the action of oceanic crusts and the movement of the shelf itself. Rinjani is one of at least 129 active volcanoes in Indonesia, four of which belong to the volcanoes of the Sunda Arc trench system forming part of the Pacific Ring of Fire – a section of fault lines stretching from the Western Hemisphere through Japan and South East Asia.

The islands of Lombok and Sumbawa lie in the central portion of the Sunda Arc. The Sunda Arc is home to some of the world's most dangerous and explosive volcanoes. The eruption of nearby Mount Tambora on Sumbawa is known for the most violent eruption in recorded history on 15 April 1815, with a scale 7 on the VEI.

The highlands are forest clad and mostly undeveloped. The lowlands are highly cultivated. Rice, soybeans, coffee, tobacco, cotton, cinnamon, cacao, cloves, cassava, corn, coconuts, copra, bananas and vanilla are the major crops grown in the fertile soils of the island. The slopes are populated by the indigenous Sasak population. There are also some basic tourist related activities established on Rinjani primarily in or about the village of Senaru.

Rinjani volcano on the island of Lombok rises to 3,726 metres (12,224 ft), second in height among Indonesian volcanoes only to Sumatra's Kerinci volcano. Rinjani has a steep-sided conical profile when viewed from the east, but the western side of the compound volcano is truncated by the 6 x 8.5 km, oval-shaped Segara Anak caldera. The western half of the caldera contains a 230-metre-deep lake whose crescentic form results from growth of the post-caldera cone Barujari at the eastern end of the caldera.

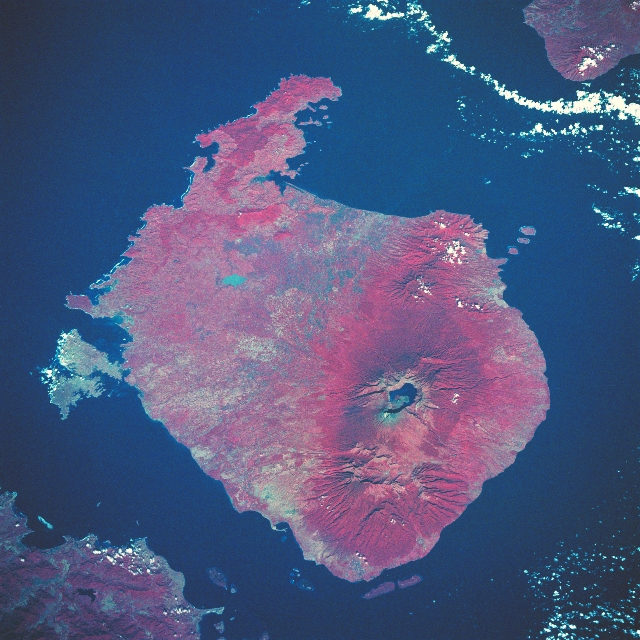
Color infrared view of Rinjani Volcano on the island of Lombok, May 1992. The eastern part of the island of Bali to the west is visible in the top right corner, separated from Lombok by the Lombok Strait; the Alas Strait and the western part of the island of Sumbawa are visible on the bottom left.

=== Geologic summary ===
On the basis of the plate tectonics theory, Rinjani is one of the series of volcanoes built in the Lesser Sunda Islands due to the subduction of Indo-Australian oceanic crust beneath the Lesser Sunda Islands, and it is interpreted that the source of melted magma is about 165–200 kilometres (103–124 mi) depth.

The geology and tectonic setting of Lombok (and nearby Sumbawa) are described as being in the central portion of the Sunda Arc. The oldest exposed rocks are Miocene, suggesting that subduction and volcanism began considerably later than in Java and Sumatra to the west, where there are abundant volcanic and intrusive rocks of Late Mesozoic age. The islands are located on the eastern edge of the Sunda shelf, in a zone where crustal thickness is apparently rapidly diminishing, from west to east.

The seismic velocity structure of the crust in this region is transitional between typical oceanic and continental profiles and the Mohorovičić discontinuity (Moho) appears to lie at about 20 kilometres (12 mi) depth. These factors tend to suggest that there has been limited opportunity for crustal contamination of magmas erupted on the islands of Lombok and Sumbawa. In addition, these islands lie to the west of those parts of the easternmost Sunda and west Banda arcs where collision with the Australian plate is apparently progressing.

The volcano of Rinjani is 165 to 190 kilometres (103–118 mi) above the Benioff Zone. There is a marked offset in the line of active volcanoes between the most easterly Sumbawa volcano (Sangeang Api) and the line of active volcanoes in Flores. This suggests that a major transcurrent fault cut across the arc between Sumbawa Island and Flores. This is considered to be a feature representing a major tectonic discontinuity between the east and west Sunda Arcs (the Sumba Fracture). Further, a marked absence of shallow and intermediate earthquake activity in the region to the south of Lombok and Sumbawa is a feature interpreted to represent a marked break in the Sunda Arc Zone. Faulting and folding caused strong deformation in the eastern part of Lombok Basin and is characterized by block faulting, shale diapirs and mud volcano.

== Volcanology ==
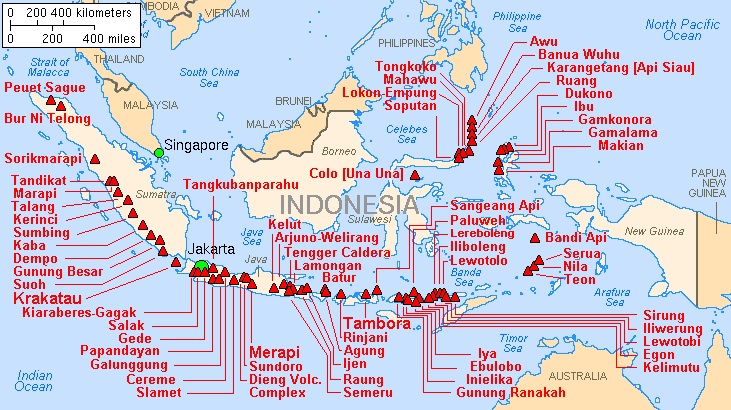
Map of volcanoes in Indonesia

The Rinjani caldera-forming eruption is thought to have occurred in the 13th century. Dated to "late spring or summer of 1257," this 1257 Samalas eruption is now considered the likely source of high concentrations of sulfur found in widely dispersed ice core samples and may have been "the most powerful volcanic blast since humans learned to write." The massive eruption may have triggered an episode of global cooling and failed harvests. Before this eruption, the Segara Anak caldera was a volcanic mountain named Samalas, which was higher than Rinjani.

Eruption rate, eruption sites, eruption type and magma composition have changed during the last 10,000 years before the caldera forming eruption. The eruptions of 1994 and 1995 have presented at Gunung Baru (or 'New Mountain' – approximately 2,300 metres (7,500 ft) above sea level) in the center of this caldera and lava flows from subsequent eruptions have entered the lake. This cone has since been renamed Gunung Barujari (or 'Gunung Baru Jari' in Indonesian).

The first historical eruption occurred in September 1847. The most recent eruption of Mount Rinjani was in May 2010 and the most recent significant eruptions occurred during a spate of activity from 1994 to 1995 which resulted in the further development of Gunung Barujari. Historical eruptions at Rinjani dating back to 1847 have been restricted to Barujari cone and the Rombongan dome (in 1944) and consist of moderate explosive activity and occasional lava flows that have entered Segara Anak lake. The eruptive history of Rinjani prior to 1847 is not available as the island of Lombok is in a location that remained very remote to the record keeping of the era.

On 3 November 1994, a cold lahar (volcanic mudflow) from the summit area of Rinjani volcano traveled down the Kokok Jenggak River killing thirty people from the village of Aikmel who were caught by surprise when collecting water from the river in the path of the flow.

In connection with the eruption of the cone Gunung Barujari the status for Gunung Rinjani was raised from Normal (VEI Level 1) to 'be vigilant' (VEI Level 2) since 2 May 2009. In May 2010 Gunung Rinjani was placed in the standby status by Center for Volcanology & Geological Hazard Mitigation, Indonesia with a recommendation that there be no activity within a radius of 4 kilometres (2.5 mi) from the eruption at Gunung Barujari.

=== Volcanic composition ===
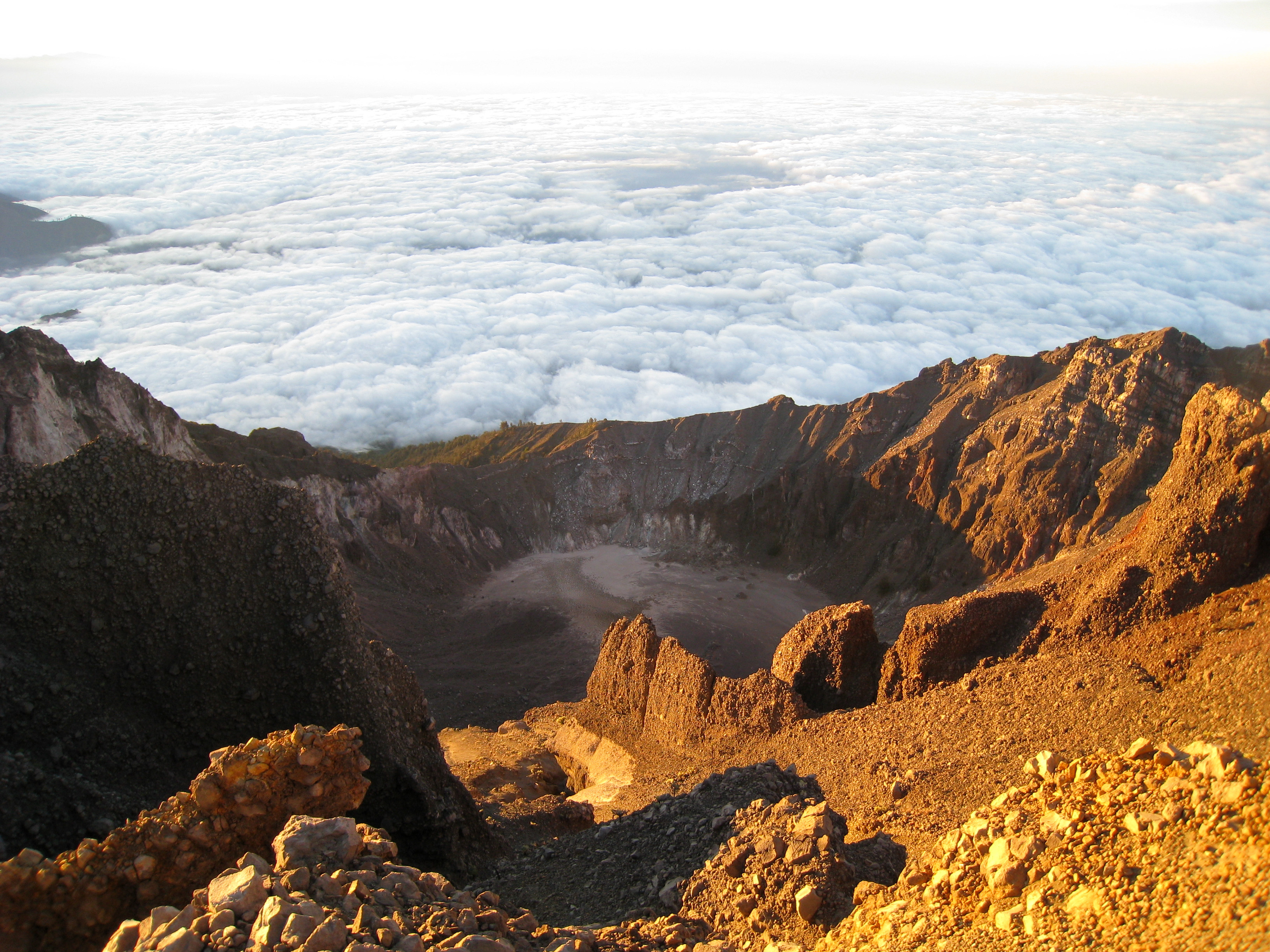
View from the summit of Gunung Rinjani

In Lombok, Rinjani volcano lies approximately 300 kilometres (190 mi) north of the Sunda Trench (also known as Java trench) and is situated about 170 kilometres (110 mi) above the active north dipping Benioff zone. Based on the composition of andesites which have very low Ni concentrations and low Mg/Mg+Fe It is suggested that the Rinjani suite is of mantle origin, but that all the andesites and dacites as well as many of the basalts have probably been modified by fractional crystallization processes. It is concluded that the Rinjani calc-alkaline suite, which in many respects is typical of many suites erupted by circum-pacific volcanoes, probably originated by partial melting of the peridotite mantle-wedge overlying the active Benioff Zone beneath Lombok Island. The Pleistocene-Recent calcalkaline suite from the active volcano, Rinjani is composed of a diverse range of lavas. These include: ankaramite, high-Al basalt, andesite, high-K andesite and dacite. Sr-isotopic and geochemical constraints suggest that this suite was derived from the sub-arc mantle. Geochemical models suggest that fractional crystallization is an important process in the suite's differentiation, although the series: ankaramite-high-Al basalt-andesite-dacite does not represent a continuously evolving spectrum of liquids.

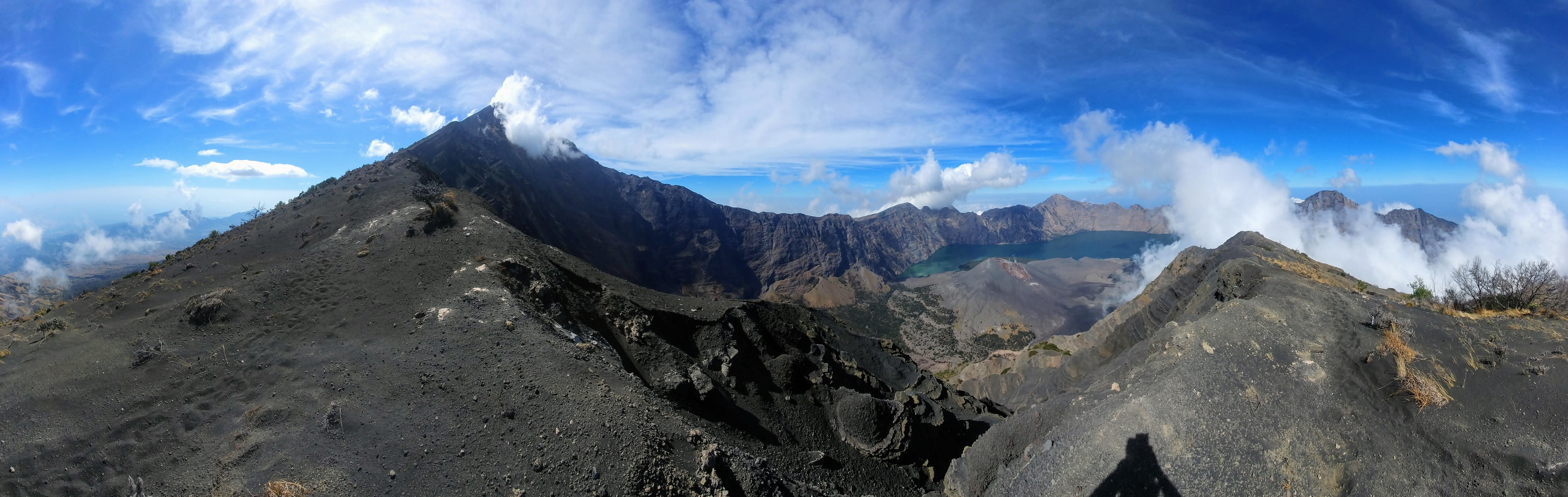
The summit, ash cone, and lake are all visible from this vantage point at 2,600m on the eastern ridge.

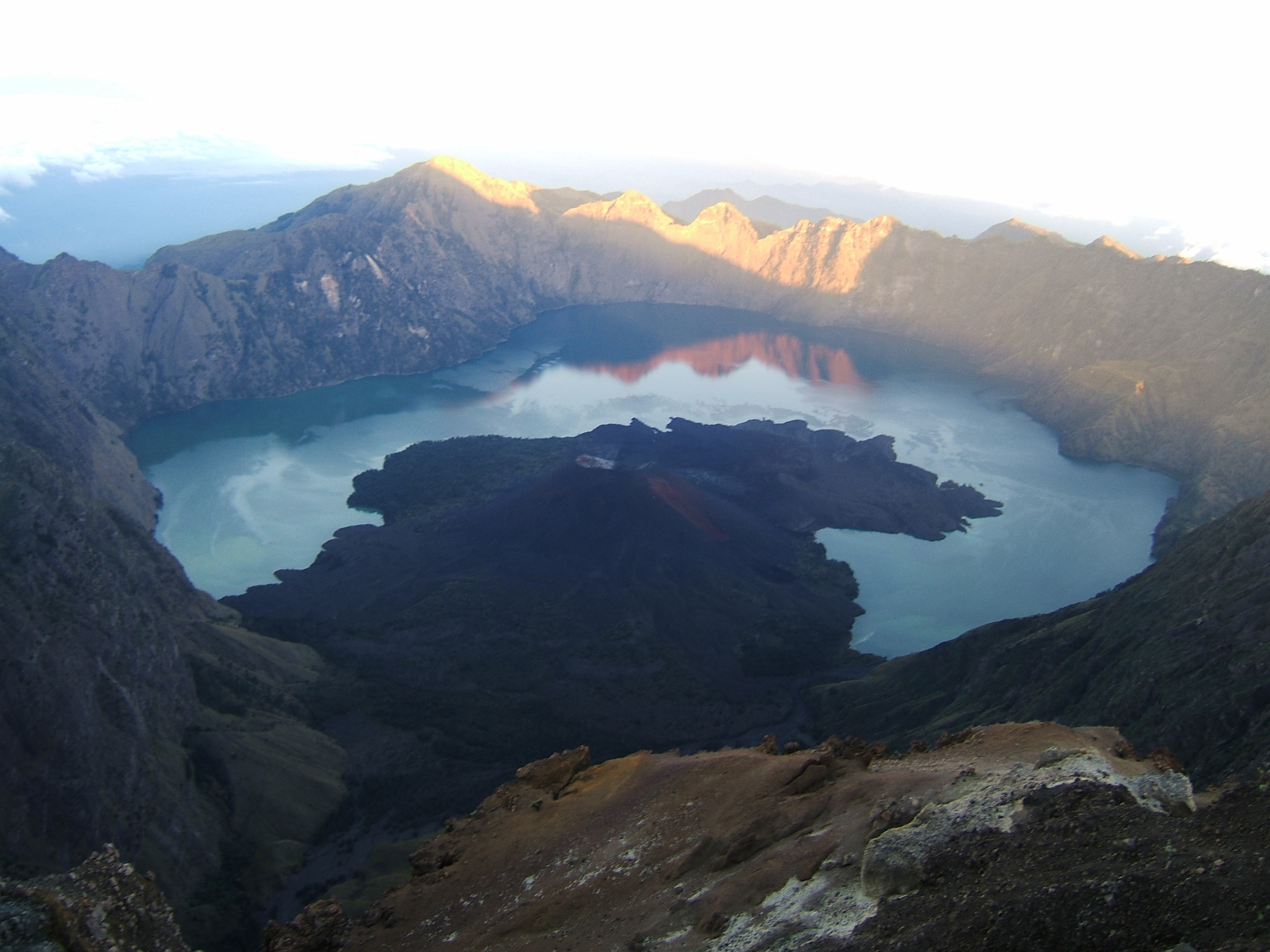
Segara Anak, the volcanic crater on the summit of Rinjani.

In September 1995 an aviation report was issued concerning an unconfirmed ash cloud from Rinjani. A NOTAM about volcanic activity from Rinjani was issued by the Bali Flight Information Region on the morning of 12 September. An ash cloud was reportedly drifting to the south west with the cloud top around 4 km (2.5 mi) altitude.

On 3 November 1994, a cold lahar (volcanic mudflow) from the summit area of Rinjani volcano traveled down the Kokok Jenggak River killing thirty people from the village of Aikmel who were caught by surprise when collecting water from the river in the path of the flow. One person remained missing as of 9 November 1994. No damage to the village was reported. Local volcanologists noted that additional lahars could be triggered by heavy rainfall.

During 4 June 1994 – January 1995 the DVGHM (Directorate of Volcanology and Geological Hazard Mitigation) noted that explosions occurred on Rinjani. Those explosions came from the Barujari volcano.

Between 3 June 1994 and 21 November 1994 records of Rinjani's eruptive history indicate activity accorded Volcanic Explosivity Index (VEI) with a rating of 3(?) with the area of activity described as Gunung Barujari. Eruptive characteristics documented for the events of that time are described as, central vent eruption with an explosive eruption, with pyroclastic flow(s), lava flow(s), fatalities and mudflow(s) (lahars).

In May 1994 a glow was noticed on the crater floor of Barujari cone, which at this time had undergone no significant activity since August 1966. A portable seismograph (PS-2) and telemetry seismograph (Teledyne) were put into operation on 27 May and 9 June, respectively. One volcanic earthquake event/day was recorded on 27, 28, 30, and 31 May. After 4 June, however, volcanic tremor with a maximum amplitude of 35 mm was recorded, presumably associated with the upward movement of magma. At 0200 on 3 June 1994, Barujari cone began erupting by sending an ash plume 500 m (1,600 ft) high. One 8 June 1994 press report described emission of "smoldering lava" and "thick smoke," as well as ashfall in nearby villages from an ash cloud rising 1,500 m (4,900 ft) above the summit. Between 3 and 10 June 1994, up to 172 explosions could be heard each day from the Sembalun Lawang volcano observatory (about 15 km (9.3 mi) NE). During this period, seismic data indicated a dramatic increase in the number of explosions per day, from 68 to 18,720. Eruptions were continuous at least through 19 June 1994, with maximum ash plume heights of 2,000 m (6,600 ft) on 9–11 June 1994.

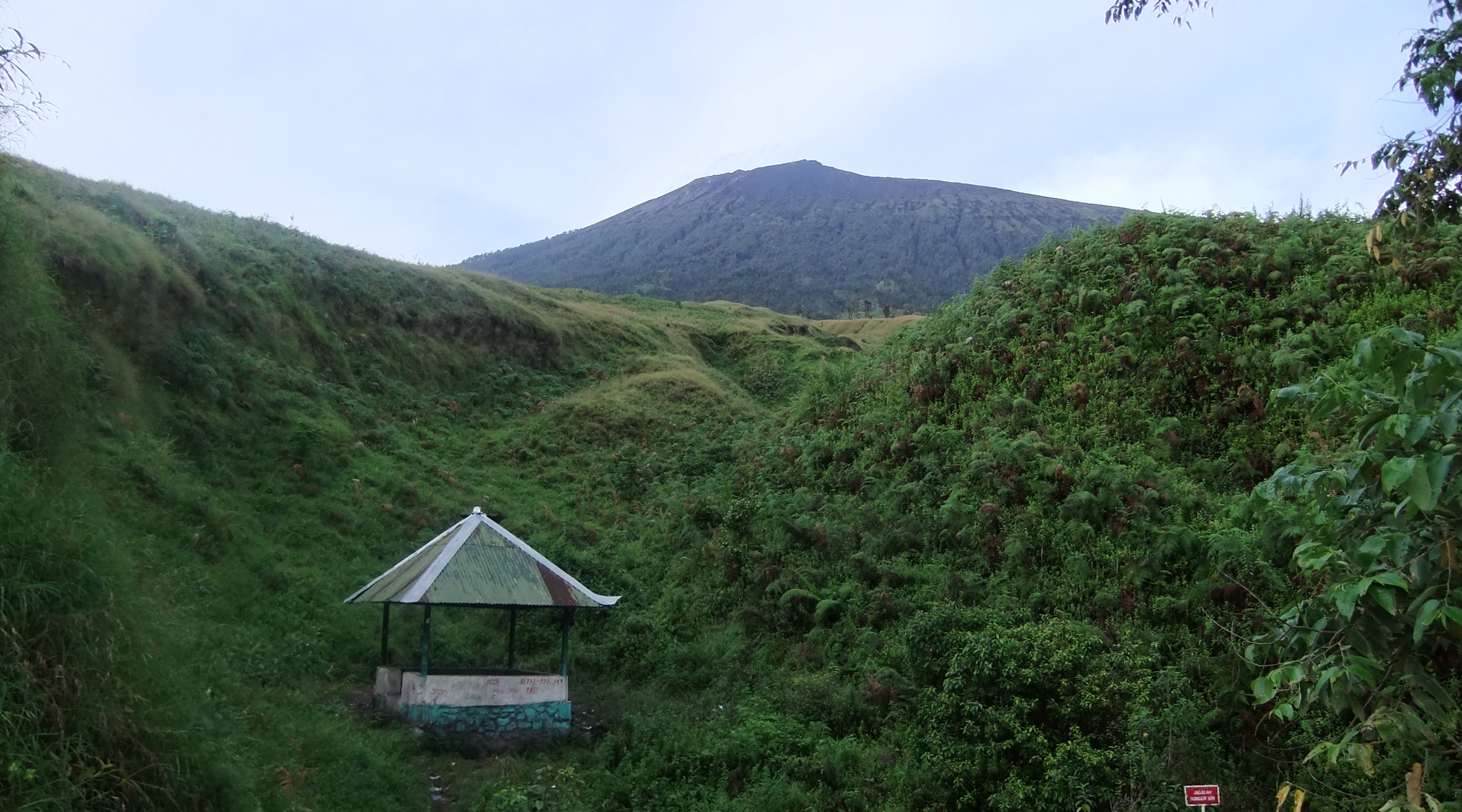
Hiking Post on Tengengean, 1500 m height on Mt. Rinjani

Between 28 March 1966 and 8 August 1966 records of Rinjani's eruptive history indicate activity accorded a Volcanic Explosivity Index (VEI) rating of 1. Lava volume of 6.6 million cubic metres (230×10^{6} cu ft) and a tephra volume of 20,000 cubic metres (710,000 cu ft) was recorded. The area of activity described was the east side of Barujari at 2,250 m (7,380 ft). Eruptive characteristics were documented as a central vent eruption, explosive eruption and lava flow(s).

In December 1944, Rinjani appears to have had a significant event. Between 25 December 1944 and 1(?) January 1945 eruptive activity is rated 2 on the Volcanic Explosivity Index (VEI) The event has been listed in the historical records of the Global Volcanism Program indicating a lava volume: of 74×10^{6} m^{3} (2.6×10^{9} cu ft) occurring in an area of activity on the north west flank of Barujari (Rombongan). The eruptive characteristics are described a central vent eruption on the flank (excentric) vent, a crater lake eruption, explosive eruption, lava flow(s) and a lava dome extrusion with associated damage to land, property.

On 27 September 2004 a DVGHM (Directorate of Volcanology and Geological Hazard Mitigation) report noted the decision to increase Rinjani's hazard status to Volcanic Explosivity Index (VEI) Alert Level 2 (Yellow). During the last third of 2004, the number of volcanic and tectonic earthquakes had increased. Their increase followed a rise in the number of tectonic earthquakes that began 18 August 2004. Tremor registered on 23, 24, 25, and 26 September 2004. Tremor amplitudes ranged between 12 and 13.5 mm, and the duration of the tremor stood between 94 and 290 seconds.

At 05:30 on 1 October 2004 Rinjani erupted. The eruption caused authorities to immediately raise the hazard status to Alert Level 3 (Orange). Details regarding the initial 1 October 2004 eruption are indistinct. During 2–5 October 2004 explosions sent ash columns 300 to 800 m (980–2,620 ft) above the summit. Gray, thick ash columns drifted to the north and detonation sounds accompanied every explosion. Successive explosions occurred at intervals of 5 to 160 minutes. Explosions vented on the north eastern slope of Barujari volcano. Some material also vented from Barujari's peak and fell down around its edifice. A press report in the Jakarta Post indicated that evacuations were not considered necessary. A Volcanic Explosivity Index (VEI):2 rating was issued for the activity between 1 May 2004 through to (on or after) 5 October 2004.

=== Activity since 2009 ===
==== 2009 ====
On 27 April 2009 Gunung Barujari became active, with activity continuing through to May 2009. The mountain was closed at that time as the eruptions intensified with plumes of smoke and ash as high as 8,000 m (26,000 ft). A Volcanic Explosivity Index (VEI):2 rating was issued for the activity between 2 May 2009 and 20 December 2009. The activity during this period was described as having the characteristics of central vent eruption, flank (excentric) vent, explosive eruption and lava flow(s).

==== 2010 ====
Rinjani erupted three times on 22 May 2010 with activity continuing until early on 23 May. According to the volcano's official monitoring agency, ash from Mount Rinjani was reported as rising up to two kilometers into the atmosphere and damaged crops. The volcano did not threaten villagers at that time. Lava flowed into the caldera lake, pushing its temperature up from 21 to 35 °C (70 to 95 °F), while smoke spread 12 kilometres (7.5 mi).

In February 2010 observers at the Gunung Rinjani Observation Post located 1.25 km (4,100 ft) northeast of G. Rinjani saw one whitish-colored plume that rose 100 metres (328 ft) from the volcano. Dense whitish plumes (and possibly brown) rose 500 to 900 m (1,600–3,000 ft) in March 2010 on 26 occasions and as high as 1,500 m (4,900 ft) in April 2010 on 41 occasions. Plumes seen on 1 and 2 May 2010 were "chocolate" in color and rose a maximum height of 1,600 metres (5,200 ft). From February 2010 through April 2010 seismicity decreased, although the maximum amplitude of earthquakes increased. CVGHM (Center of Volcanology and Geological Hazard Mitigation) also noted that ash eruptions and ejected incandescent material fell within Rinjani caldera, but some ash was blown out of the caldera.

The activity in early 2010 centred about Gunung Barujari, a post-caldera cone that lies within the Rinjani's caldera lake of Segara Anak. The Volcanological Survey of Indonesia reported on 1 May 2010, that a column of smoke was observed rising from G. Rinjani "issuing eruptions 1300–1600 metres tall with thick brown color and strong pressure". Their report Evaluasi Kegiatan G. Rinjani of 4 May also stated that on 1 May 2010 at 10:00 four events of explosive earthquake were recorded with a maximum amplitude of 6–53 mm and 110 seconds long earthquake, earthquake tremor events with a maximum amplitude of 1 mm and 55 second long duration, 15 Local Tectonic earthquake events and two events of tectonic earthquake.

The Volcanic Explosivity Index (VEI) Alert Level was raised to 2 (on a scale of 1–4) on 2 May 2010. Level 1 is "Normal" and Level 2 is "Advisory" with an Aviation Alert color of Yellow-Advisory. Based on analysis of satellite imagery, the Darwin VAAC (Volcanic Ash Advisory Center) reported that on 5 May a possible ash plume from Rinjani rose to an altitude of 5.5 kilometres (3.4 mi) a.s.l. and drifted 150 kilometres (93 mi) NW. The plume was not seen in imagery about six hours later. CVGHM (Center of Volcanology and Geological Hazard Mitigation) advised the VAAC that intermittent activity could produce ash plumes to 1.5 km (4,900 ft) above the caldera.

==== 2015 ====
On 31 October 2015, Mount Rinjani started erupting again.

==== 2018 ====
On 29 July 2018 a magnitude 6.4 earthquake caused landslides on the north portion of Mount Rinjani.

=== August 2018 ===
On 5 August 2018, a second earthquake struck Lombok, causing more landslides and small tsunamis due to its proximity to the northern coast. The area around Rinjani was evacuated due to concerns of a possible eruption, but no increase in activity was detected at Rinjani or the nearby volcano Mount Agung on Bali.

=== Monitoring program ===
Gunung Rinjani Observation Post Rinjani Sembalun is located in the village of Lawang, Sub Sembalun 2.5 km (4000 feet) northeast of G. Rinjani) in the Regency of East Lombok. Observers at this post monitor G.Rinjani, G.Barujari/G.Tenga within the Segara Anak Caldera.

== Rinjani National Park ==
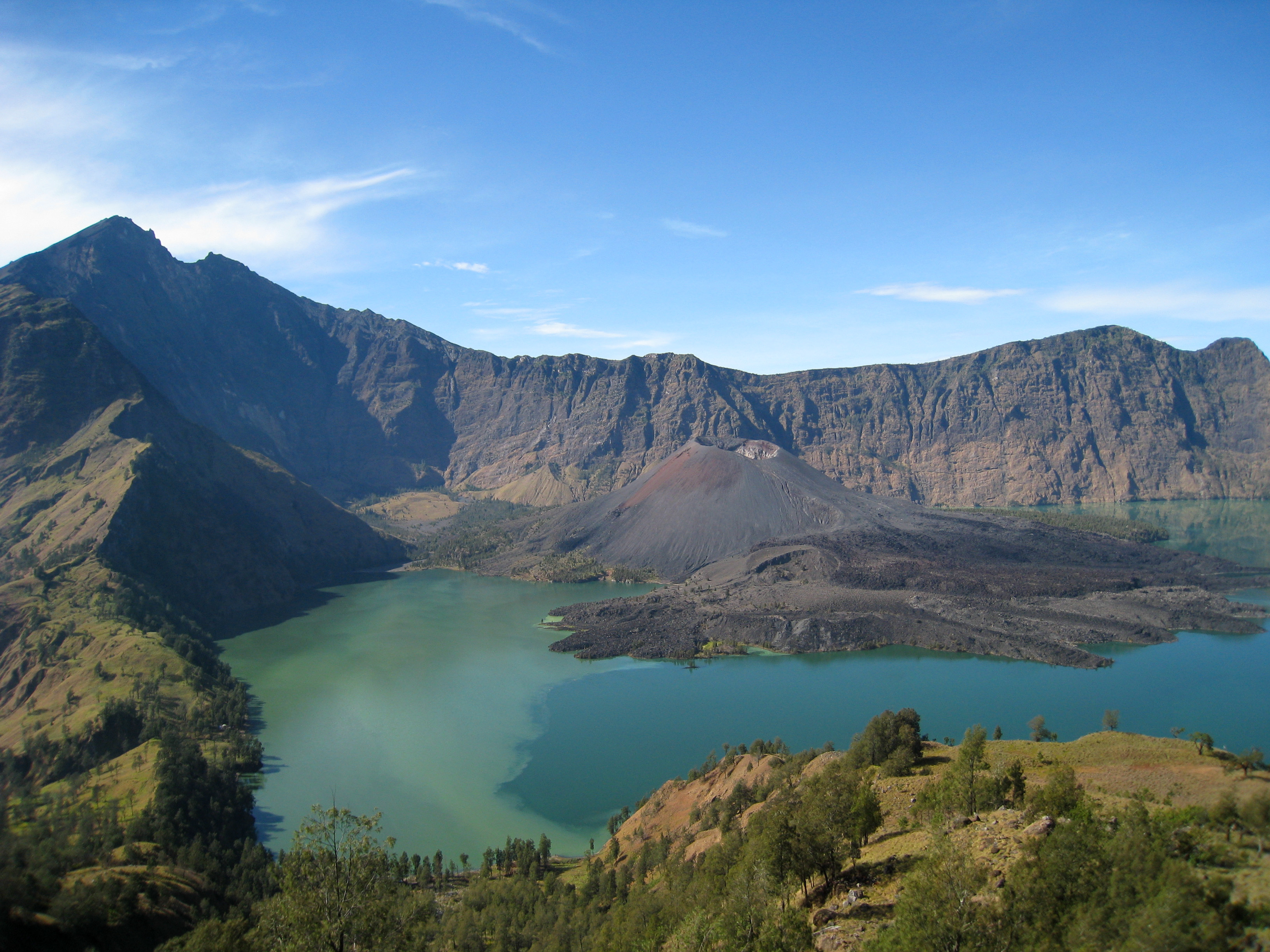
View of Segara Anak from the crater rim

The volcano and the caldera are protected by the Gunung Rinjani National Park established in 1997. Tourism is increasingly popular with trekkers able to visit the rim, make their way into the caldera or even to make the more arduous climb to the highest point; fatalities, however, are not unheard of. In July 2009 the summit route was closed due to volcanic activity at that time and subsequently reopened when the activity decreased. During early 2010 up to and including May 2010 access to Rinjani was at times again restricted due to volcanic activity.

The park is popular for mountain climbs and trekking and represents an important nature reserve and water catchment area. The park is officially 41,330 hectares (159.6 mi^{2}) within the park boundaries and includes a further 66,000 hectares (250 mi^{2}) of protected forest outside. The mountain and its satellites form the Mount Rinjani National Park (Taman Nasional Gunung Rinjani). Mount Rinjani has obtained the World Legacy Award from Conservation International and Traveller (2004), and was a finalist for Tourism for Tomorrow Awards (2005 and 2008) from the World Travel Tourism Council (WTTC).

The Rinjani scops owl was found in 2003 and after 10 years of research was recognized as a new endemic species (specimens had been collected in the 19th century but had been identified as being Mollucas scops owls).

== Eruption history of Rinjani ==
VEI	Date Start-Stop	Lava Volume	Tephra Volume	Area of Activity	Eruptive Characteristics	Note	Refs
?	2016 September 27 14:45 WITA			Gunung Barujari	Ash ejected to atmosphere		
?	2015 October 31; Ongoing			Gunung Barujari	Ash plumes lava flows Strombolian explosions		
2	2010 February; 2010 May 23			Gunung Barujari	Ash plumes ejected incandescent material fell within Rinjani caldera some ash was blown out of the caldera possible ash plume rose to an altitude of 5.5 km further ash plumes to 2 km, lava flows, crop damage	SI / USGS Weekly Volcanic Activity Report-Rinjani; PVMGV-Evaluasi Kegiatan G. Rinjani ABC Asia Pacific News Service 24 may2010	
2	2009 May 2; 2009 Dec 20 (?)			NE flank of Gunung Barujari	Central vent eruption Flank (excentric) vent Explosive eruption Lava flow(s)	Historical Records; GVP-Rinjani	
2	2004 Oct 1; 2004 Oct 5 (on or after)			Summit and NE flank of Gunung Barujari	Central vent eruption Central vent eruption Flank (excentric) vent Explosive eruption	Historical Records; GVP-Rinjani	
0	1995 Sep 12				Explosive eruption (?)	Historical Records; GVP-Rinjani; Eruption "Uncertain"	
3?	1994 Jun 3; 1994 Nov 2			Gunung Barujari	Central vent eruption Explosive eruption Pyroclastic flow(s) Lava flow(s) Fatalities Mudflow(s) (lahars)	Historical Records; GVP-Rinjani (VEI): 3?	
1	1966 Mar 28; 1966 Aug 8	6.6×10^{6} m^{3}	2×10^{4} m^{3}	Eastern side of Gunung Barujari (2250 m)	Central vent eruption Explosive eruption Lava flow(s) (?)	Historical Records; GVP-Rinjani	
0?	1965 Sep (end) Unknown			Gunung Barujari	Flank (excentric) vent eruption Lava flow(s) (?)	Historical Records; GVP-Rinjani	
0?	1953 Oct 15 ± 45 days (end) Unknown			Gunung Barujari	Central vent eruption	Historical Records; GVP-Rinjani (VEI): 0?	
0?	1949; 1950 (months uncertain)			NW flank of Gunung Barujari	Central vent eruption Explosive eruption Lava flow(s)	Historical Records; GVP-Rinjani	
2	1944 Dec 25; 1945 Jan 1 (?)	7.4×10^{7} m^{3}		NW flank of Barujari (Rombongan)	Central vent eruption Flank (excentric) vent Crater lake eruption Explosive eruption Lava flow(s) Lava dome extrusion Damage (land, property, etc.)	Historical Records; GVP-Rinjani	
0	1941 May 30 (end) Unknown			Rinjani summit	Central vent eruption	Historical Records; GVP-Rinjani; Eruption is Uncertain	
2	1915 Nov 4 (end) Unknown			Gunung Barujari (Segara Munjar)	Central vent eruption Explosive eruption	Historical Records; GVP-Rinjani	
2	1909 Nov 30; 1909 Dec 2			Gunung Barujari	Central vent eruption Explosive eruption Mudflow(s) (lahars)	Historical Records; GVP-Rinjani	
1	1906 Apr 29 (end) Unknown			Gunung Barujari	Central vent eruption Explosive eruption	Historical Records; GVP-Rinjani	
2	1901 Jun 1; 1901 Jun 2			Gunung Barujari	Central vent eruption Explosive eruption	Historical Records; GVP-Rinjani	
2	1900 Nov 30; 1900 Dec 2			Gunung Barujari	Central vent eruption Explosive eruption Lava flow(s)	Historical Records; GVP-Rinjani	
2	1884 Aug 8; 1884 Aug 10 ± 1 day			Gunung Barujari	Central vent eruption Explosive eruption	Historical Records; GVP-Rinjani	
2	1847 Sep 10; 1847 Sep 12			Gunung Barujari	Central vent eruption Explosive eruption	Historical Records; GVP-Rinjani	
7	1257			Gunung Samalas, the former twin peak of Gunung Rinjani, destroyed after the explosion.	Caldera-forming eruption; possible trigger of the Little Ice Age. The largest eruption in the past 2000 years.	Based on Arctic deposit study	
4	2,550 ± 50 B.P.		0.4 km^{3}		Producing the Rinjani Pumice and a sub-plinian pumice fall deposit	^{14}C	

== Incidents ==
From May 2007 to the present, Mount Rinjani has seen numerous climber tragedies. In March 2007, seven people died of exposure after illegally scaling the volcano during a ban. On June 9, 2014, a 53‑year‑old Australian climber collapsed and died from a sudden asthma attack just 2 kilometres (1.2 mi) inside the park. Days later, in May 8–10, 2016, 26‑year‑old Indonesian Ike Suseta Adelia drowned in Segara Anak crater lake; heavy rain and steep shores delayed her recovery. On November 10, 2016, a 24-year-old Malaysian national Ng Yin Teck fell near Aiq Kalak spring after ignoring route warnings.

During the July 2018 Lombok earthquake, multiple climbers and guides were killed by landslides triggered on Rinjani's slopes. A particularly harrowing case occurred on September 29, 2024, when climbers near the summit required search and rescue (SAR) intervention after a serious fall. Shortly after, on October 3–4, 2024, a 34‑year‑old Russian illegally climbing near Post 2 on the Sembalun route fell about 200 metres (660 ft), suffering fractured skull and tailbone, and required a five‑hour rescue. In a fatal recurrence, on May 3–4, 2025, 57‑year‑old Malaysian Rennie Abdul Ghani plunged approximately 80 metres (260 ft) in the Torean/Banyu Urip section; his body was recovered by multi‑agency SAR teams.

=== Death of Juliana Marins ===
Juliana Marins, a 26‑year‑old Brazilian publicist and solo traveler from Niterói, was trekking with a group on Mount Rinjani when she slipped from the trail during a night hike on June 20, 2025. She reportedly asked her guide to stop due to exhaustion and took a break alone; about an hour later, she lost her footing and fell into a steep ravine, initially sliding some 300 metres (980 ft) down before coming to rest roughly 500 metres (1,600 ft) below the path amid jagged terrain and precarious cliffs. Drone footage from the following morning captured signs that she was alive (moving and calling out for help) but dense fog, freezing nighttime temperatures, unstable footing from landslides, and extreme weather made rescuers unable to reach her quickly. Search teams deployed vertical rescue specialists and prepared helicopter extraction efforts, but operations were repeatedly halted by poor visibility, wind, and the danger of further landslides.

During the four days she remained stranded, Juliana's family publicly contested reports that she had been provided with food, water, clothing, or shelter, calling out the rescue operation as mishandled, possibly staged, and marred by misinformation. They alleged that local authorities misled them, delayed crucial updates, and even fabricated drone rescue footage. Diplomatic involvement included Brazil's Ministry of Foreign Affairs sending two officials to Jakarta to monitor progress and support the family. On June 24, Indonesian officials confirmed her death after teams accessed the ravine and examined her condition—by then, she had shifted closer, to about 150 metres (490 ft) down, but was beyond aid. Her body was successfully recovered the next day, following a ground retrieval effort of over five hours that avoided helicopter usage due to ongoing hazards.

The tragedy sparked widespread outrage across Brazil. Juliana's family subsequently called for a formal investigation by Brazilian and Indonesian authorities, seeking accountability for what they view as a botched rescue, lack of transparency, and negligent oversight. The incident also drew solidarity statements from Brazilian President Luiz Inácio Lula da Silva and the Ministry of Foreign Affairs.

== See also ==
- List of volcanoes in Indonesia
- List of ultras of the Malay Archipelago
- 1257 Samalas eruption
