= Geothermal areas in New Zealand =

Located in a geologically active region, New Zealand has numerous geothermal features, including volcanoes, hot springs, geysers and volcanic lakes. Many of these features cluster together geographically, notably throughout the central North Island's Taupō Volcanic Zone. These areas attract scientific interest and tourism; power generators, industry and civil engineering also utilise them.

== Tourist areas ==
- Whakarewarewa, Rotorua

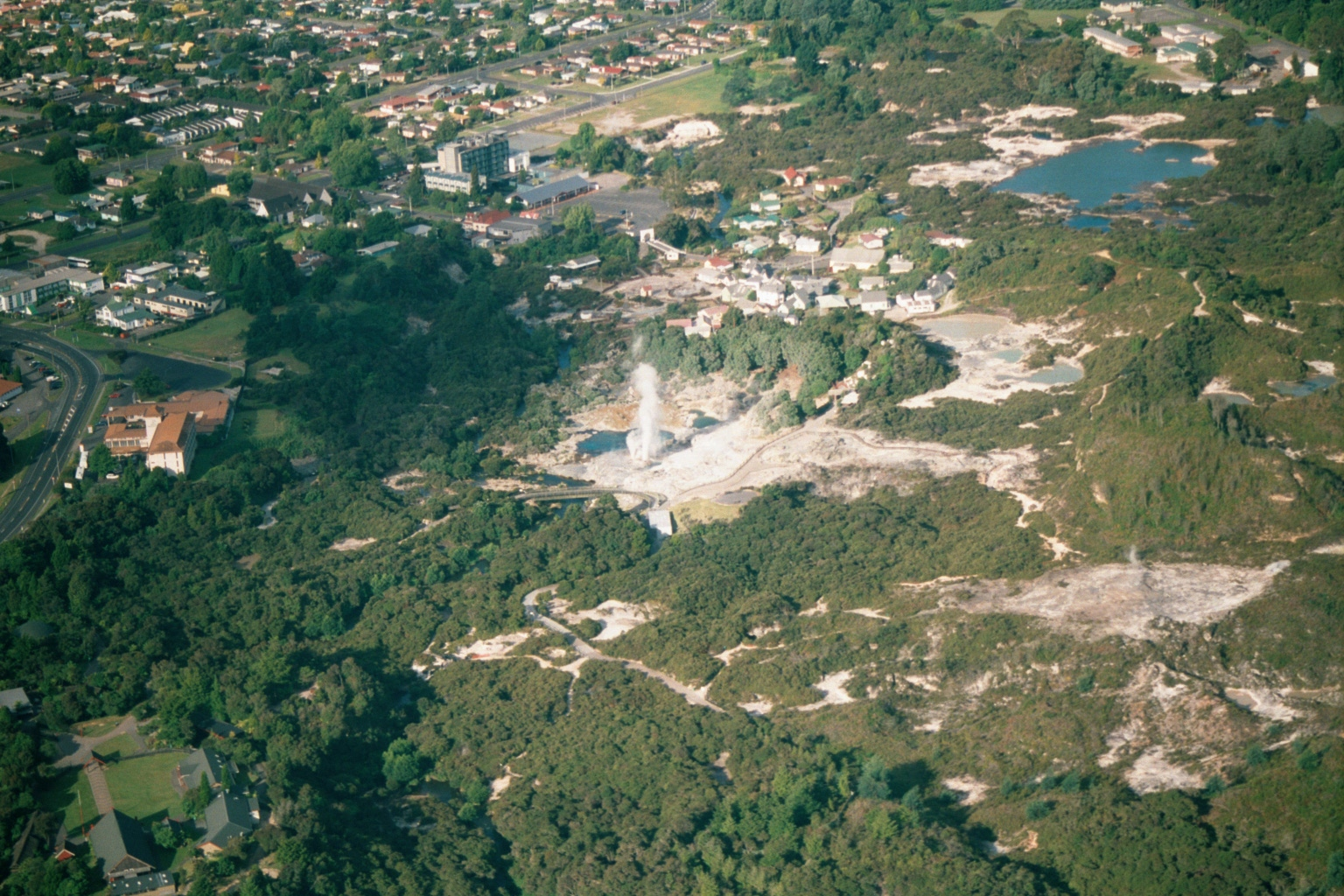
Aerial view of Pōhutu Geyser erupting

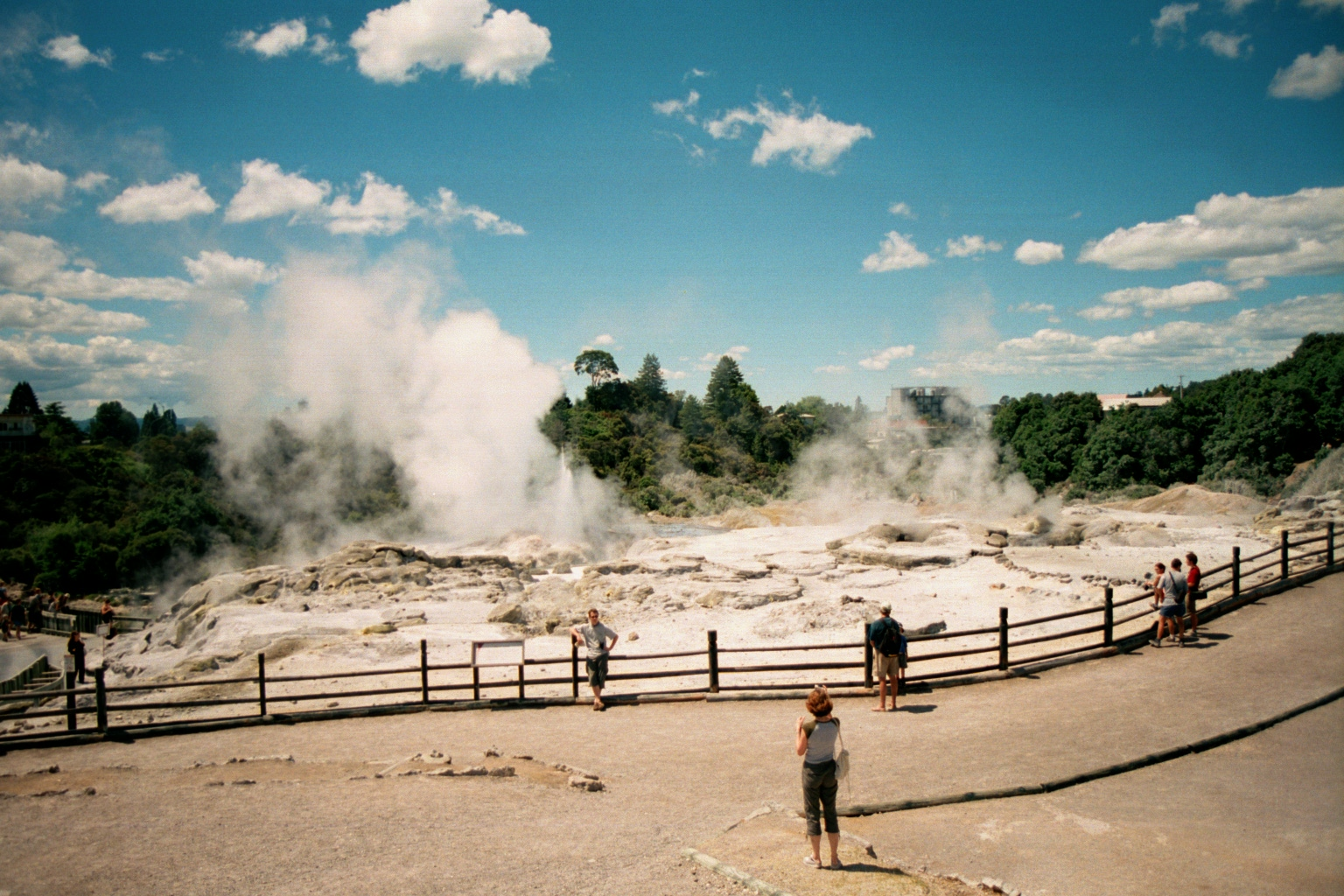
Geyser Flat

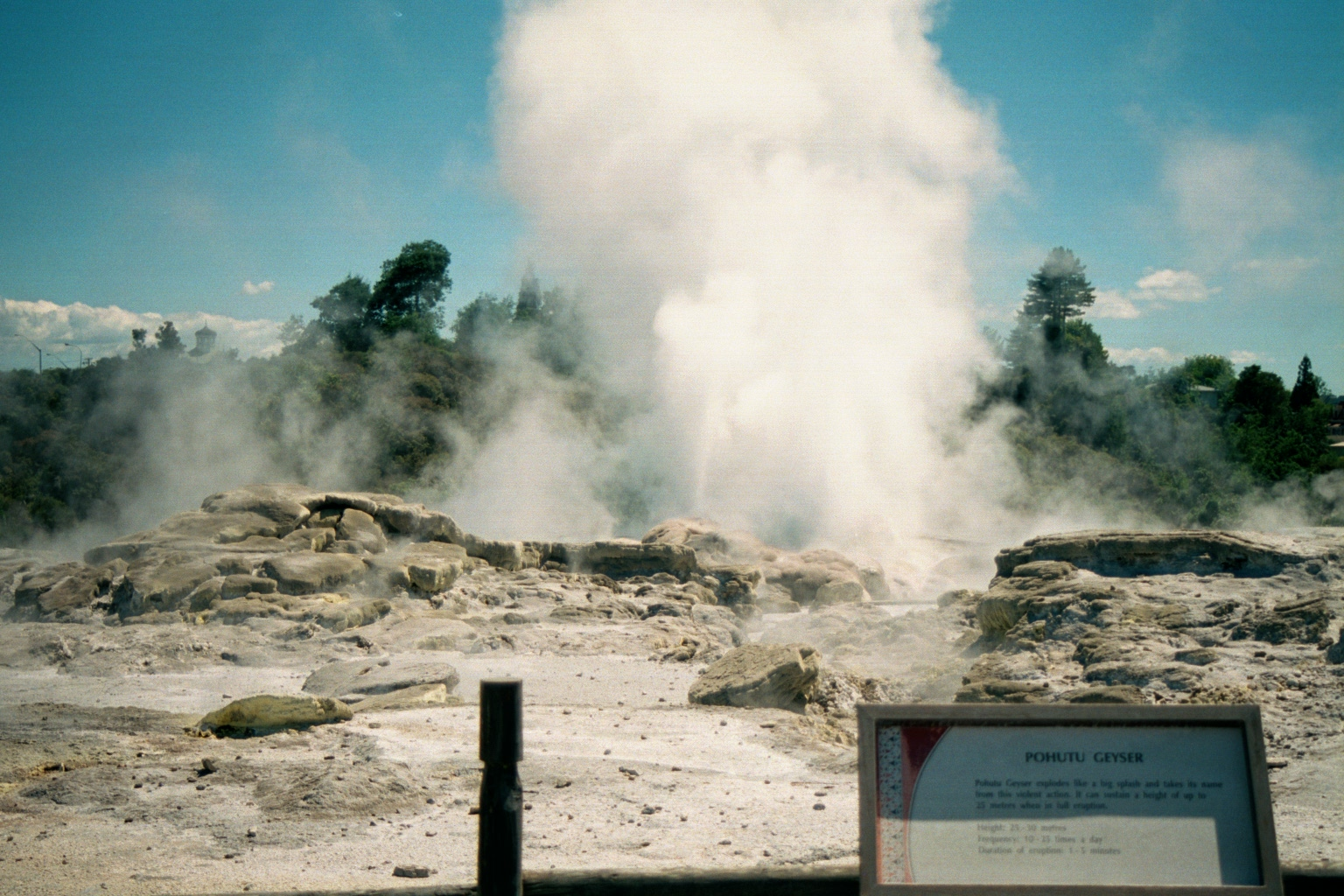
Pōhutu Geyser

- Tikitere (Hell's Gate), north of Rotorua
- Waimangu, south of Rotorua

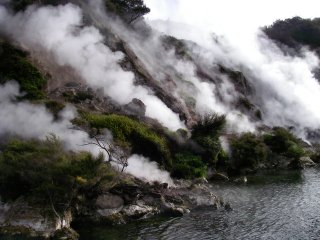
Thermal activity on the shore of Lake Rotomahana near the former site of the Pink Terrace

- Waiotapu, south of Rotorua

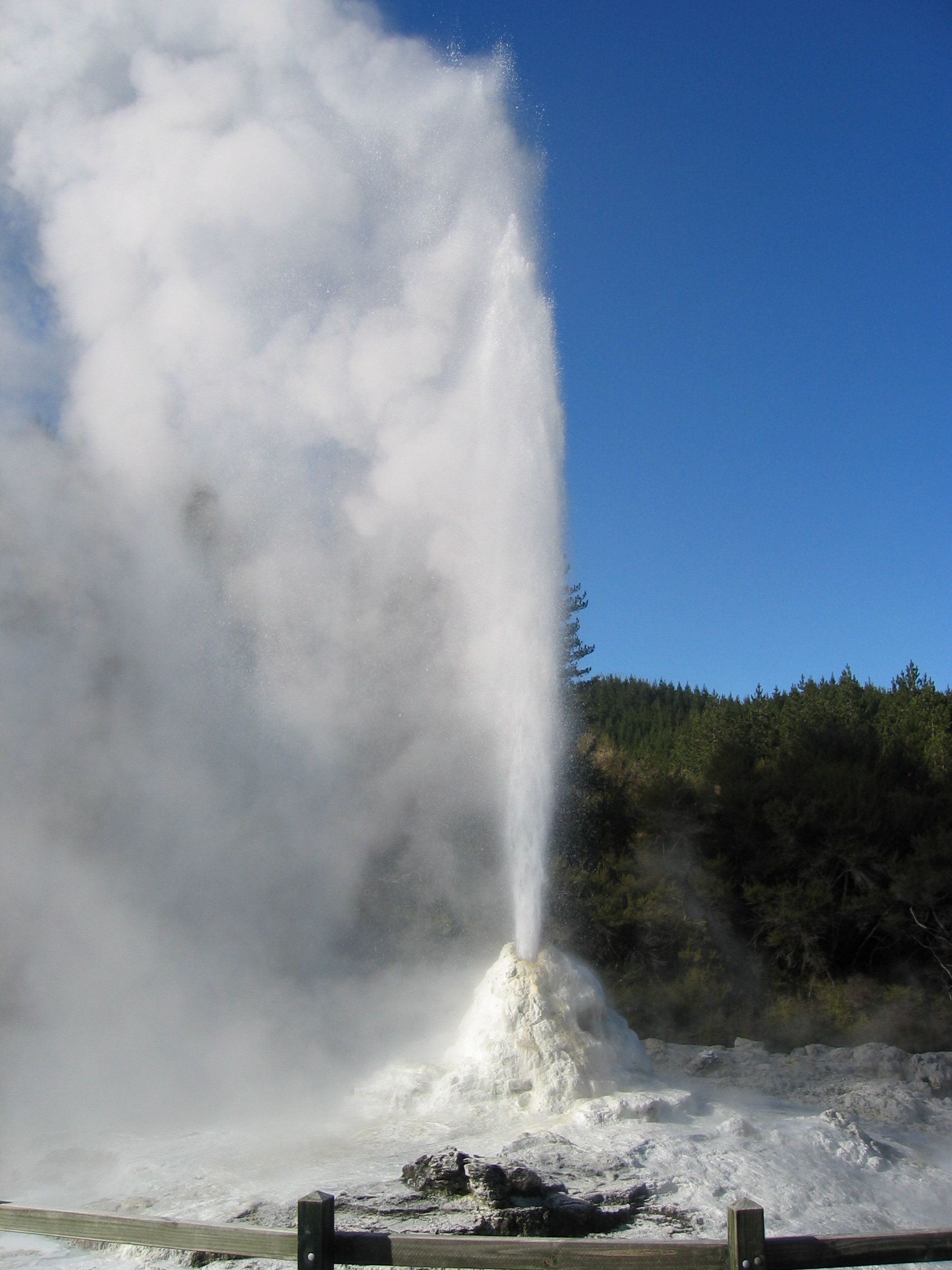
Lady Knox Geyser erupting

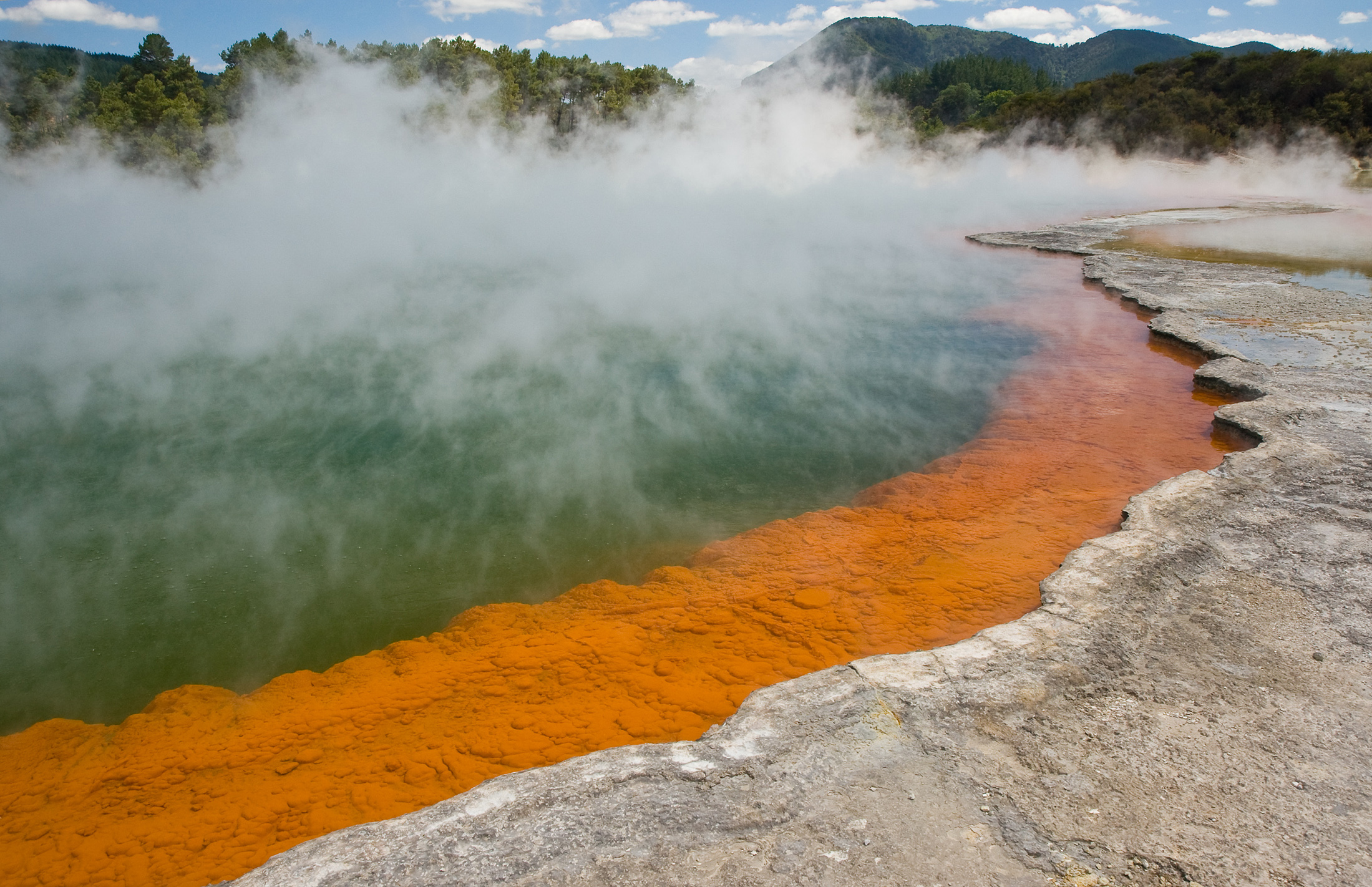
Champagne Pool

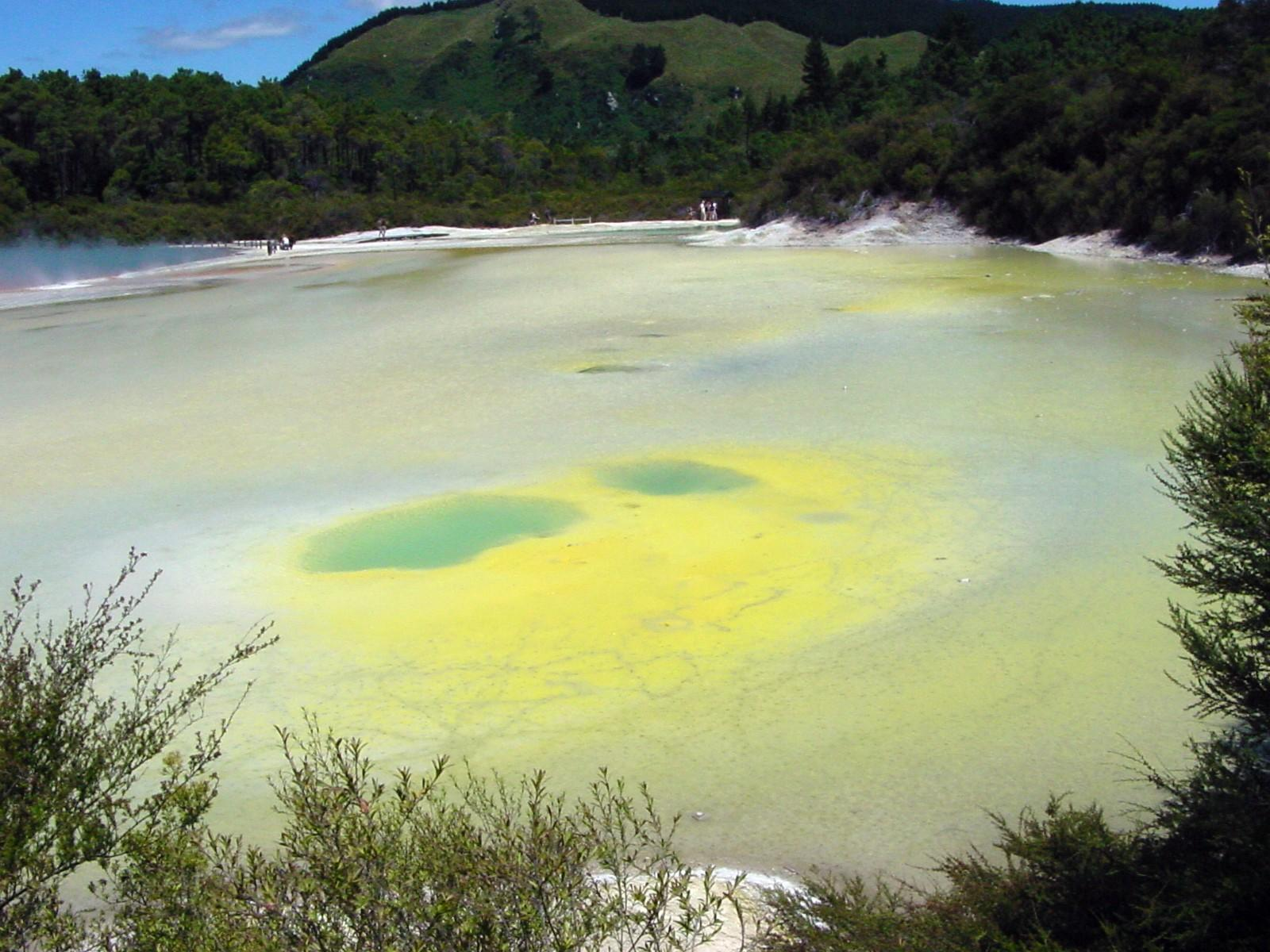
Artist's Palette

- Craters of the Moon, Wairakei, north of Taupō

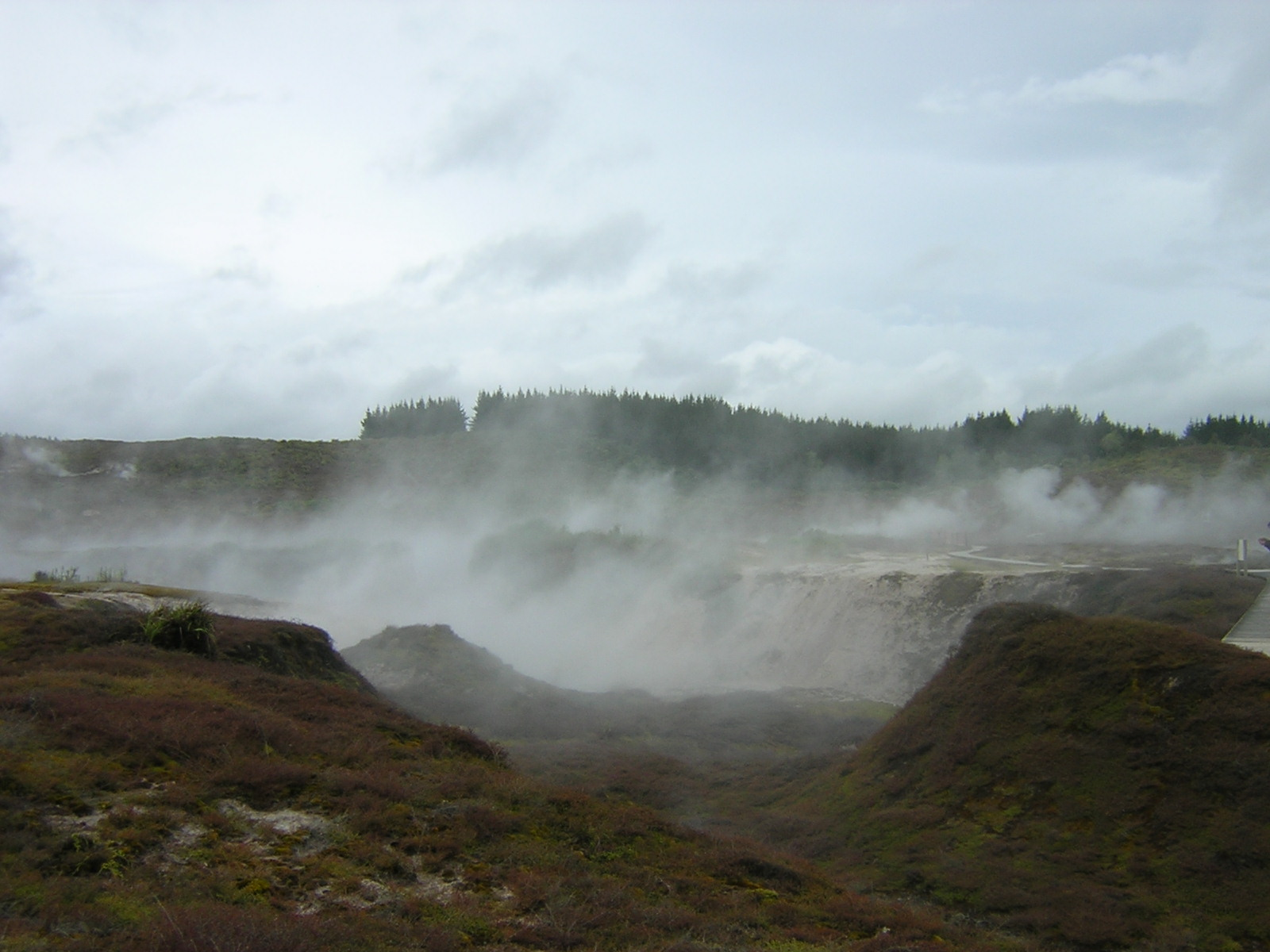
Steam vents at Craters of the Moon

- Orakei Korako, north of Taupō

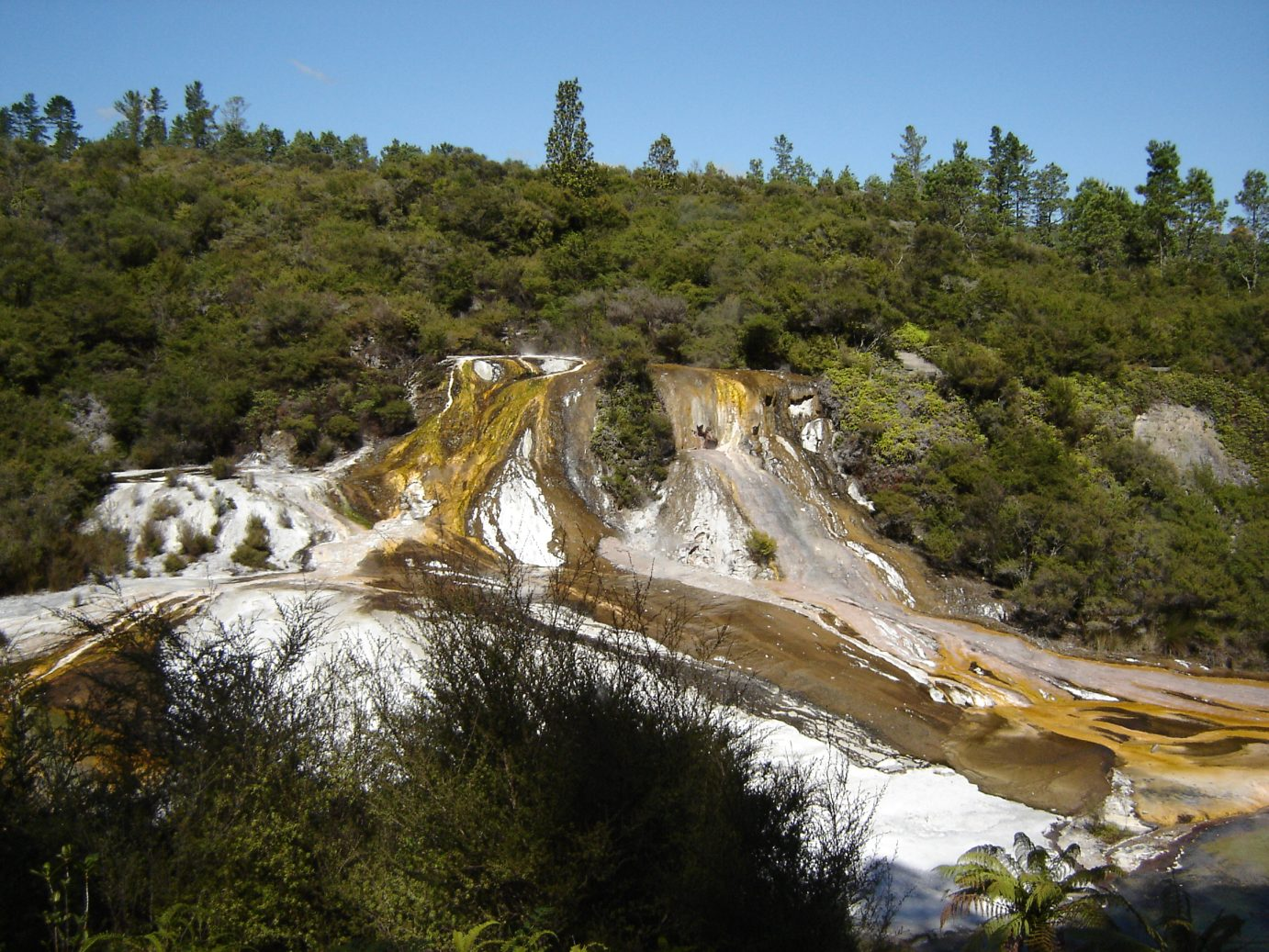
Orakei Korako

== See also ==
- Geothermal power in New Zealand
- Hot springs in New Zealand
