= Champagne Pool =

Lake in New Zealand

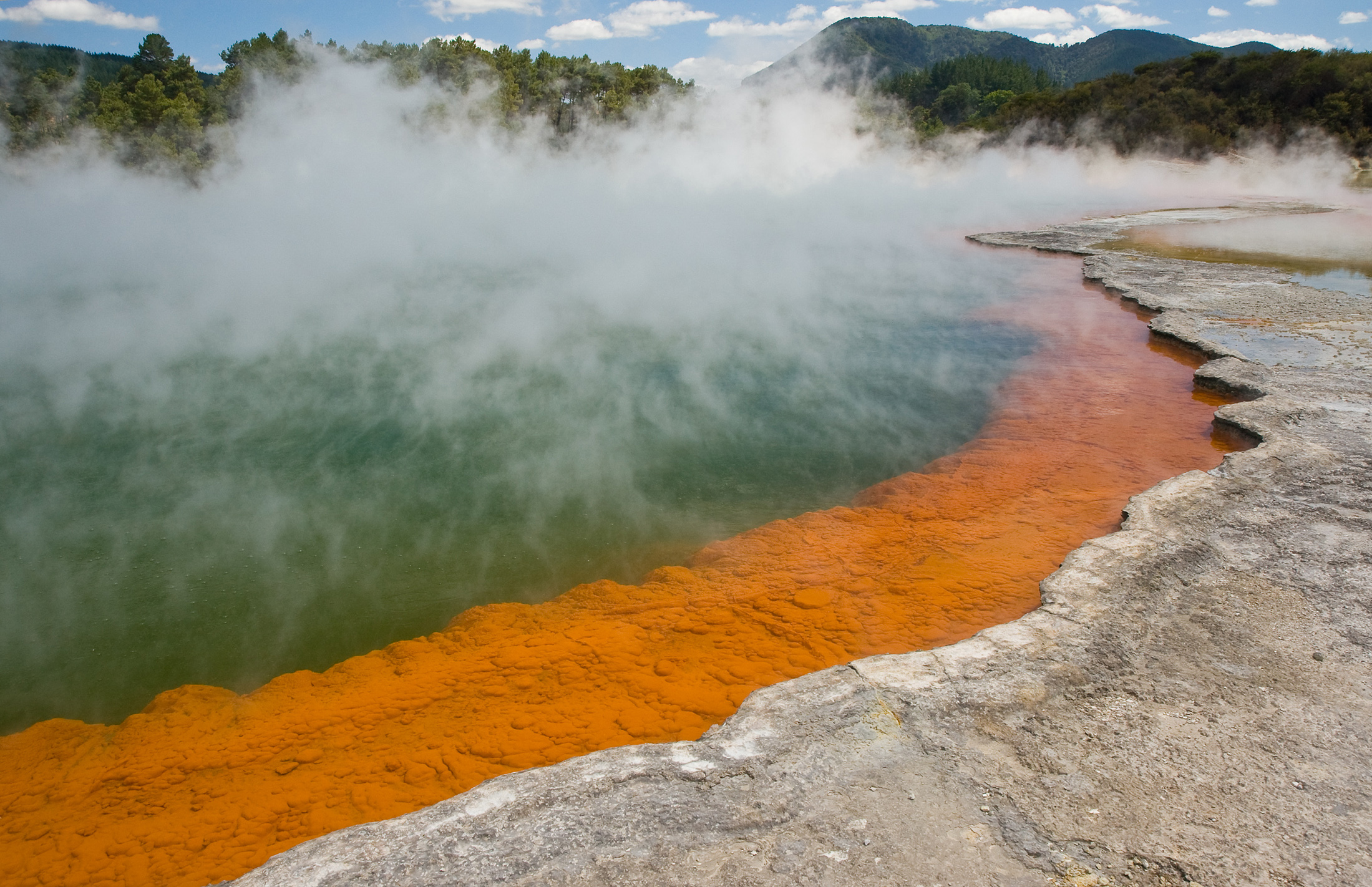
- The orange colour originates from deposits of arsenic and antimony sulfides.

- Location within North Island
- Location: Waiotapu, North Island
- Coordinates: 38.359086°S 176.368901°E
- Type: geothermal
- Basin countries: New Zealand
- Max. length: 65 m (213 ft)
- Max. depth: 62 m (203 ft)
- Water volume: 50,000 m^{3} (1,800,000 ft^{3})
- Residence time: 34 days

Champagne Pool is a prominent geothermal feature within the Waiotapu geothermal area in the North Island of New Zealand. The terrestrial hot spring is located about 30 km (20 mi) southeast of Rotorua and about 50 km (30 mi) northeast of Taupō. The name Champagne Pool is derived from the abundant efflux of carbon dioxide (CO_{2}), similar to a glass of bubbling champagne. The hot spring was formed 900 years ago by a hydrothermal eruption, which makes it in geological terms a relatively young system. Its crater is about 65 m (213 ft) in diameter with a maximum depth around 62 m (203 ft) and is filled with an estimated volume of 50,000 m^{3} (1,800,000 ft^{3}) of geothermal fluid.

== Hydrochemistry ==
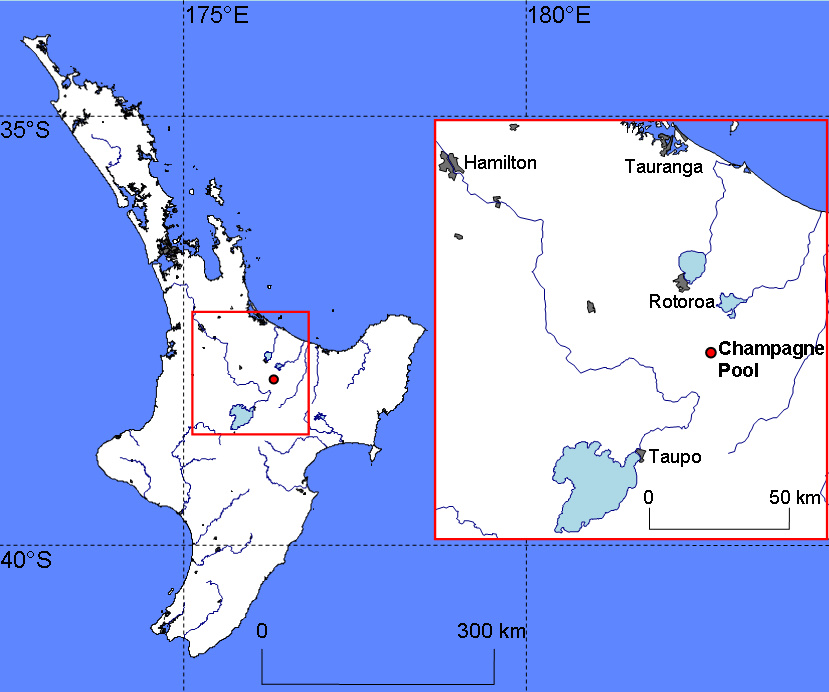
Location of Champagne Pool

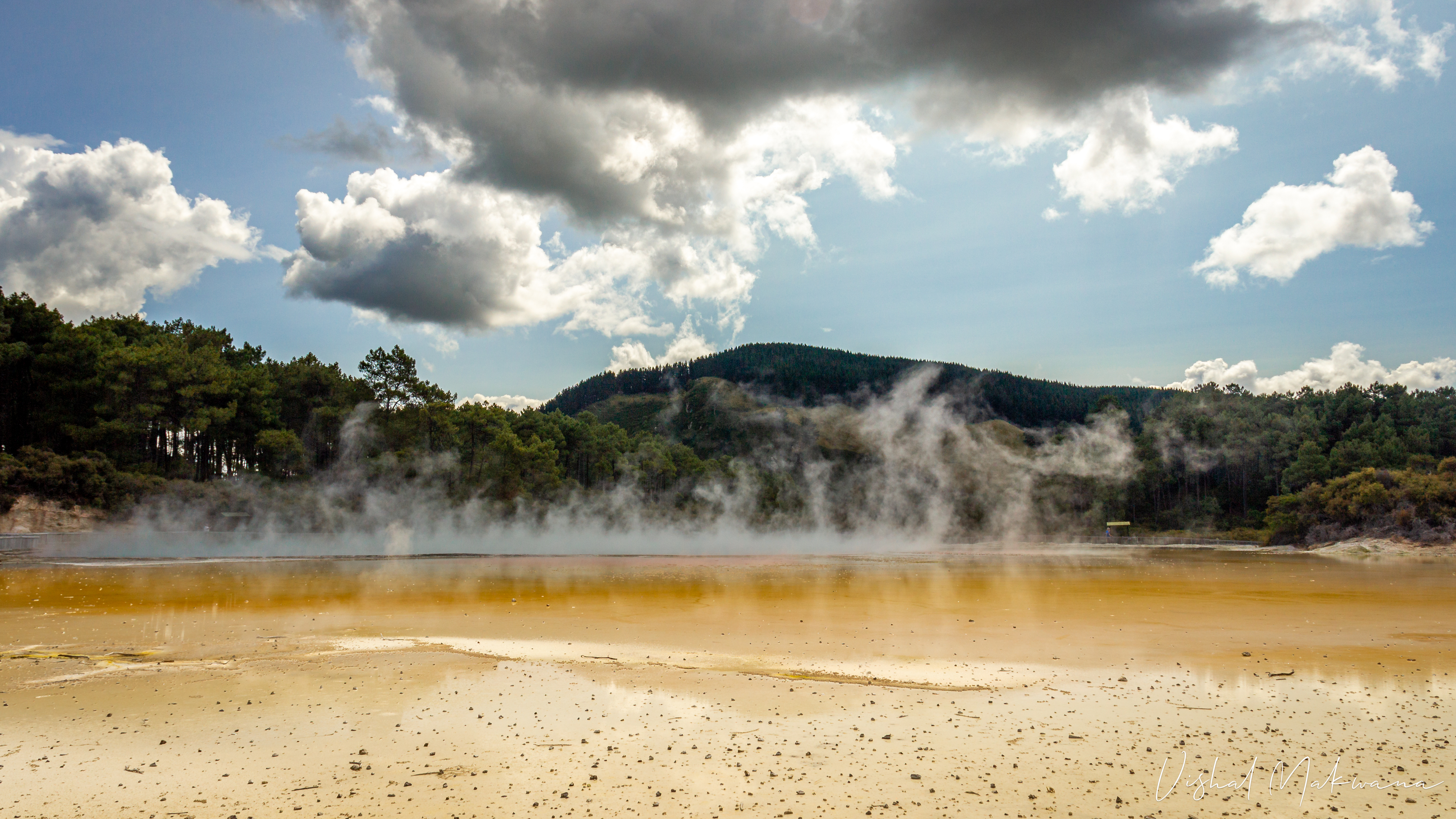
View of Champagne Pool

The deep geothermal water below Champagne Pool is of the order of 260 °C (500 °F) but water temperature within the pool is maintained at 73 °C (163 °F) to 75 °C (167 °F) by losing heat to the atmosphere. The pH of 5.5 is relatively constant due to buffering by the flux of CO_{2}. Gases are mainly CO_{2}, but to lesser extent nitrogen (N_{2}), methane (CH_{4}), hydrogen (H_{2}), hydrogen sulphide (H_{2}S), and traces of oxygen (O_{2}). The siliceous geothermal fluid is oversaturated with metalloid compounds such as orpiment (As_{2}S_{3}) and stibnite (Sb_{2}S_{3}), which precipitate and form orange subaqueous deposits. The colourful deposits are in sharp contrast to the grey-white silica sinter surrounding Champagne Pool.

== Biology ==
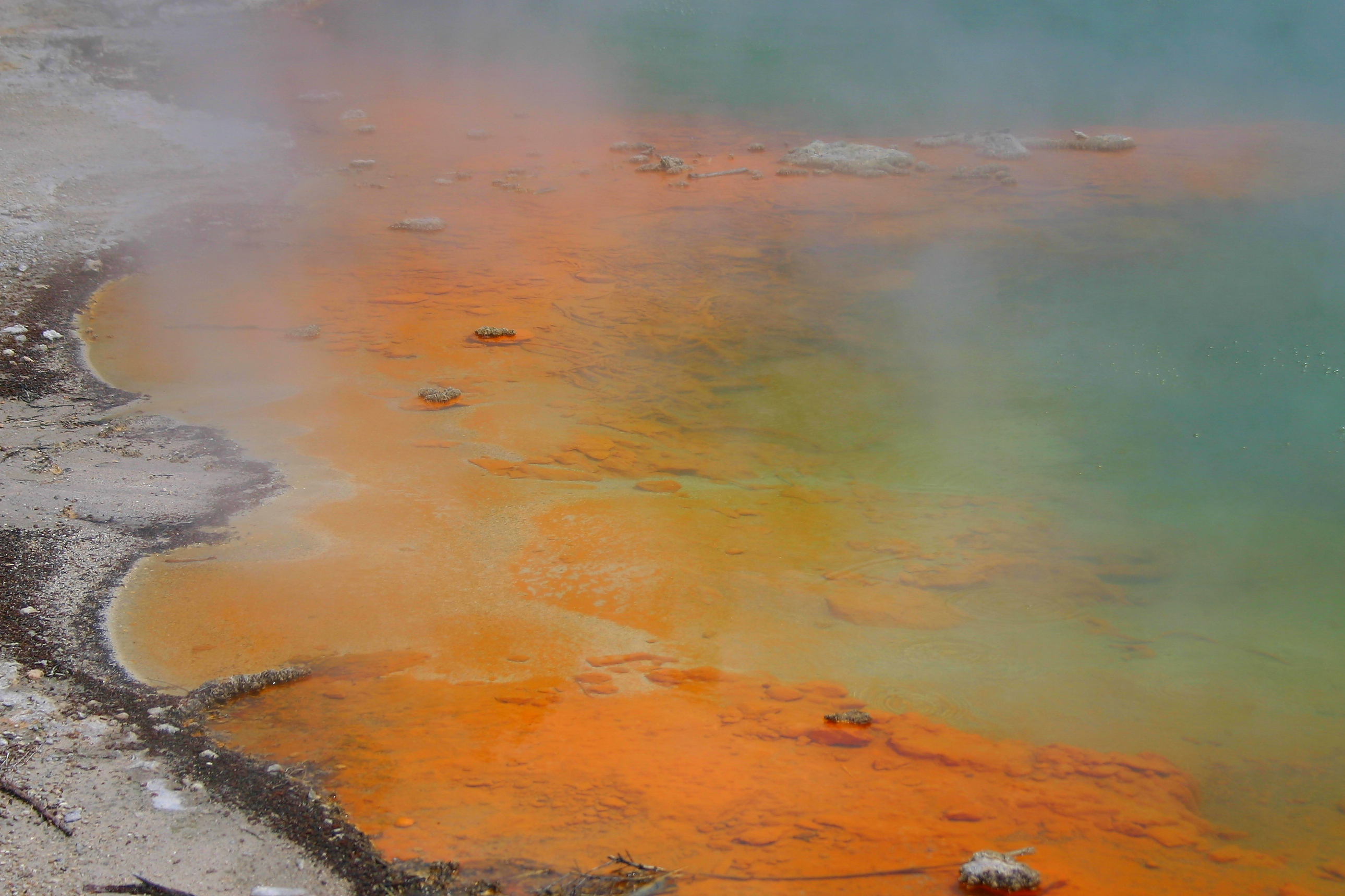
High-resolution image of the edge of the pool detailing the orpiment and stibnite deposits

Although Champagne Pool is geochemically well characterised, few studies have addressed its role as a potential habitat for microbial life forms. H_{2} and either CO_{2} or O_{2} would be available as metabolic energy sources for autotrophic growth of methanogenic or hydrogen-oxidising microorganisms. Culture-independent methods provided evidence for filamentous, coccoid, and rod-shaped cell morphologies in the hot spring. Two novel bacteria and a novel archaeon have been successfully isolated from Champagne Pool. Bacterial isolate CP.B2 named Venenivibrio stagnispumantis tolerates relatively high concentrations of arsenic and antimony compounds and represents a novel genus and species within the order Aquificales.

== See also ==
- Hot springs in New Zealand
