= Craters of the Moon =

Craters of the Moon may refer to:

- Lunar craters, craters on the Earth's Moon
- Craters of the Moon National Monument and Preserve, a volcanic preserve in Idaho
- Craters of the Moon (geothermal site), in New Zealand
