= Hot springs in New Zealand =

Geothermal feature

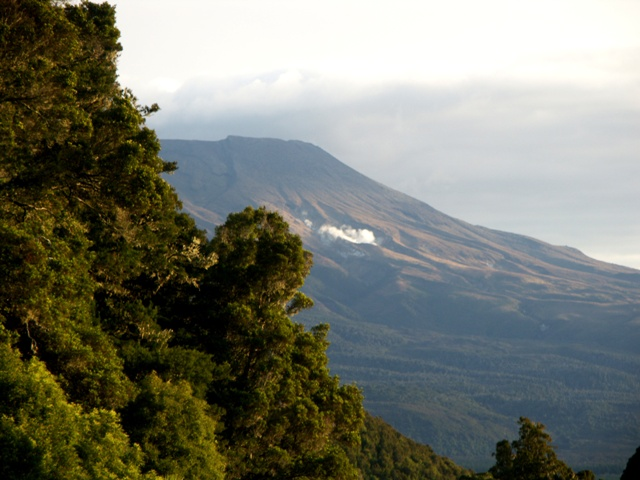
Ketetahi Springs

New Zealand has a large number of hot springs. Many of them are used for therapeutic purposes.

The highest concentration of such springs is in the Central Plateau region of the North Island, in the Taupō Volcanic Zone. The area of Whakarewarewa near Rotorua is also known as Waiariki, from the Māori name for hot springs, due to the abundance of geothermal features in the area.

== Hot springs of New Zealand ==
This is an incomplete list and does not include the less notable or popular locations.

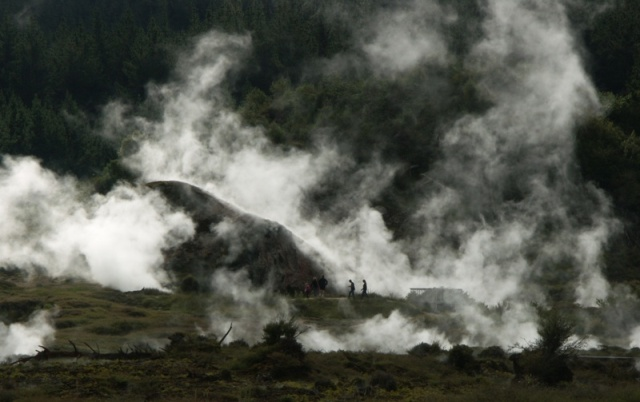
Craters of The Moon hot springs

=== North Island ===
- Awakeri
- Broadlands
- Craters of the Moon geothermal area
- Frying Pan Lake now known as Waimangu Cauldron
- Hot Water Beach (Hahei)
- Katikati
- Kawerau
- Ketetahi Springs
- Mangatutu Hot Springs
- Matamata (Crystal Hot springs)
- Miranda
- Mōrere
- Mount Maunganui
- Mount Ruapehu
- Ngawha Springs
- Okoroire
- Paeroa
- Parakai
- Rotorua
- Taranaki Thermal Springs[pg 249]
- Taupō (Spa Creek, De Bretts)
- Tauranga
- Te Aroha
- Te Puia Springs (Gisborne region)
- Te Puia Springs (Kawhia)
- Tokaanu Thermal Pools[pg 305]
- Tokoroa
- Waihi Village, Tokaanu, and Motuoapa near Tūrangi
- Waingaro
- Wairakei
- Waiwera, near Orewa
- Whitianga (The Lost Spring)

=== South Island ===
- Hanmer Springs
- Hurunui River
- Maruia Springs, Maruia River
- Otehake River
- Wanganui River
- Welcome Flat, Copland River

== See also ==
- Geothermal areas in New Zealand
