= Waiotapu =

Geothermal area and attraction in New Zealand

Coordinates: 38°21′34″S 176°22′11″E

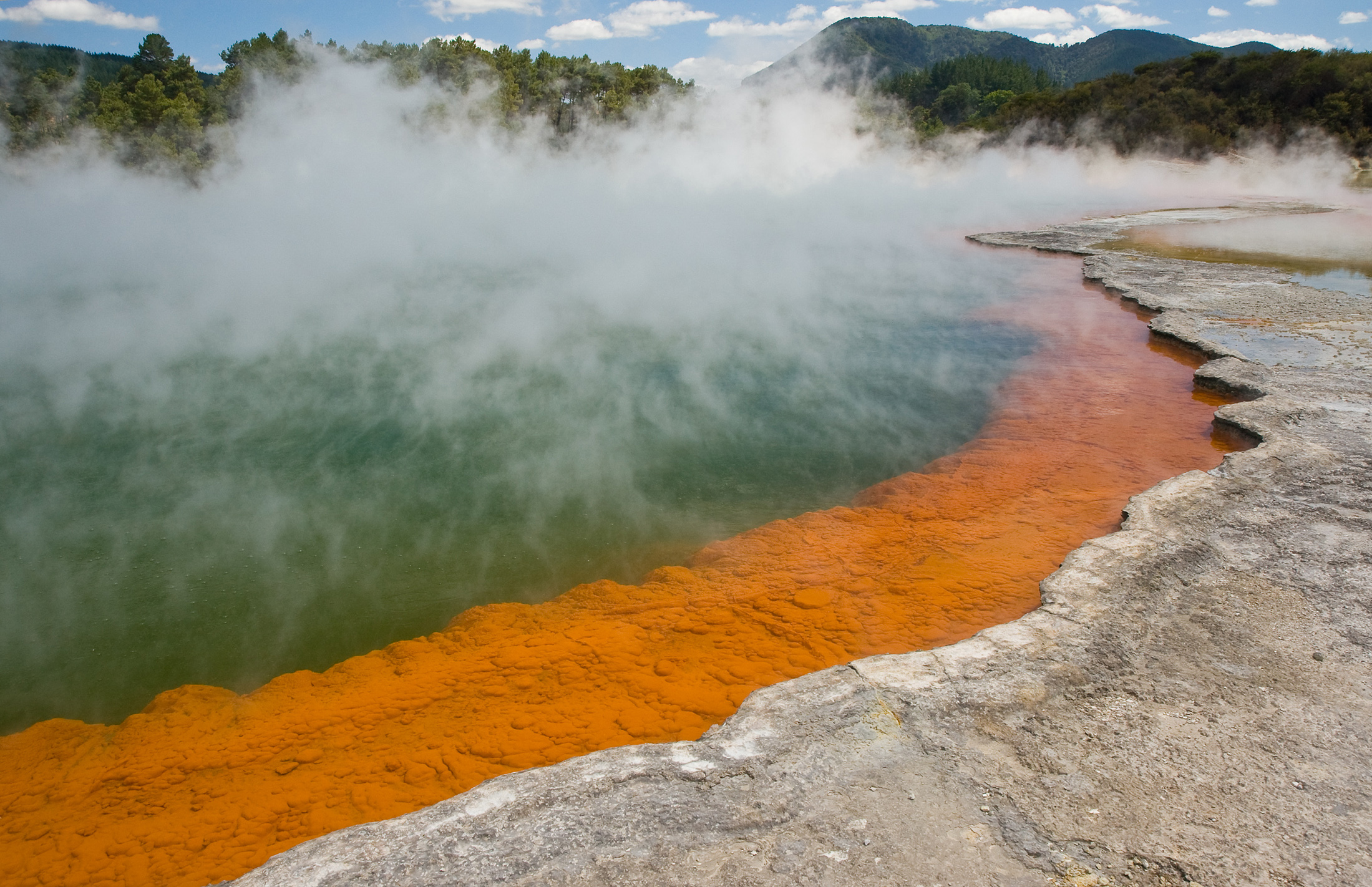
Champagne Pool

Waiotapu (Māori for "sacred waters") is an active geothermal area at the southern end of the Okataina Volcanic Centre, just north of the Reporoa caldera, in New Zealand's Taupō Volcanic Zone. It is 27 kilometres south of Rotorua. Due to dramatic geothermal conditions beneath the earth, the area has many hot springs noted for their colourful appearance, in addition to the Lady Knox Geyser, Champagne Pool, Artist's Palette, Primrose Terrace and boiling mud pools. These can mostly be viewed through access by foot, and in addition to a paid and curated experience, naturally forming hot springs appear around the area. The geothermal area covers 18 square kilometres. Prior to European occupation the area was the homeland of the Ngāti Whaoa tribe, who descended from those on the Arawa waka (canoe).

The area has a long history as a tourist attraction. While the area has been protected as a scenic reserve since 1931, a tourist operation occupies part of the reserve under a concession. It operates under the name "Wai-O-Tapu Thermal Wonderland". The business was bought in 2012 by Te Arawa Group Holdings, a local Maori tribal business, from the Sewell/Leinhardt family, who had run it for 30 years.

New Zealand State Highway 38 begins at Waiotapu and runs south-east through Kaingaroa Forest to Murupara.

== Gallery ==
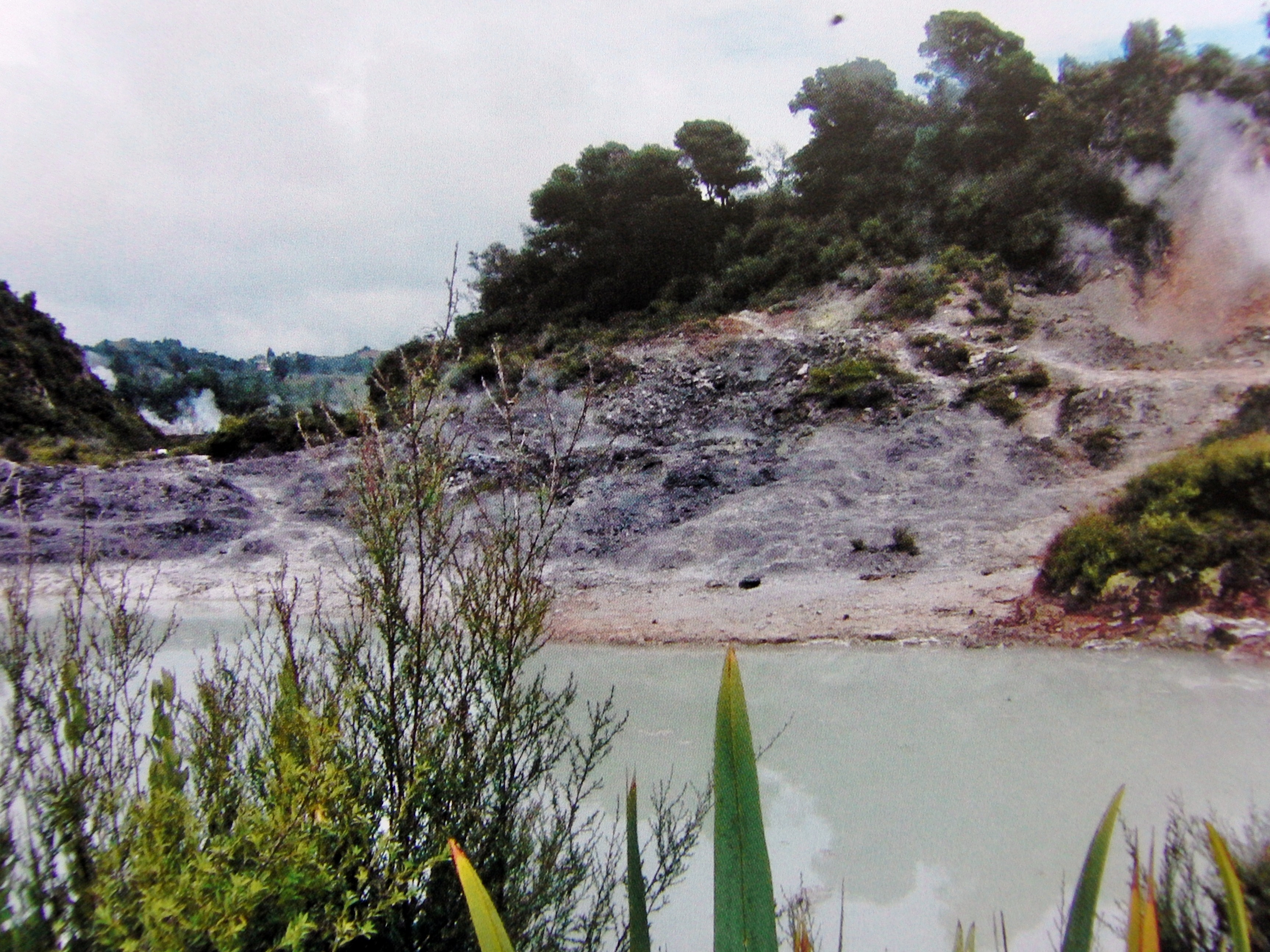
Echo Lake

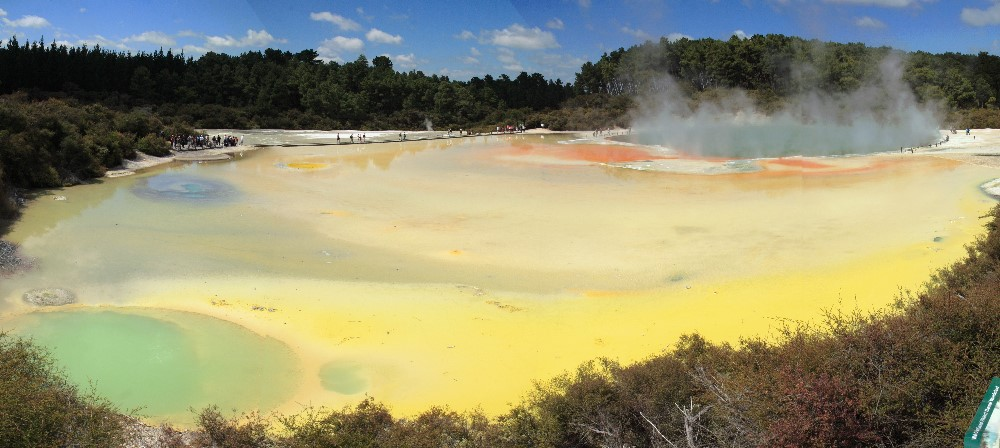
Central Pools

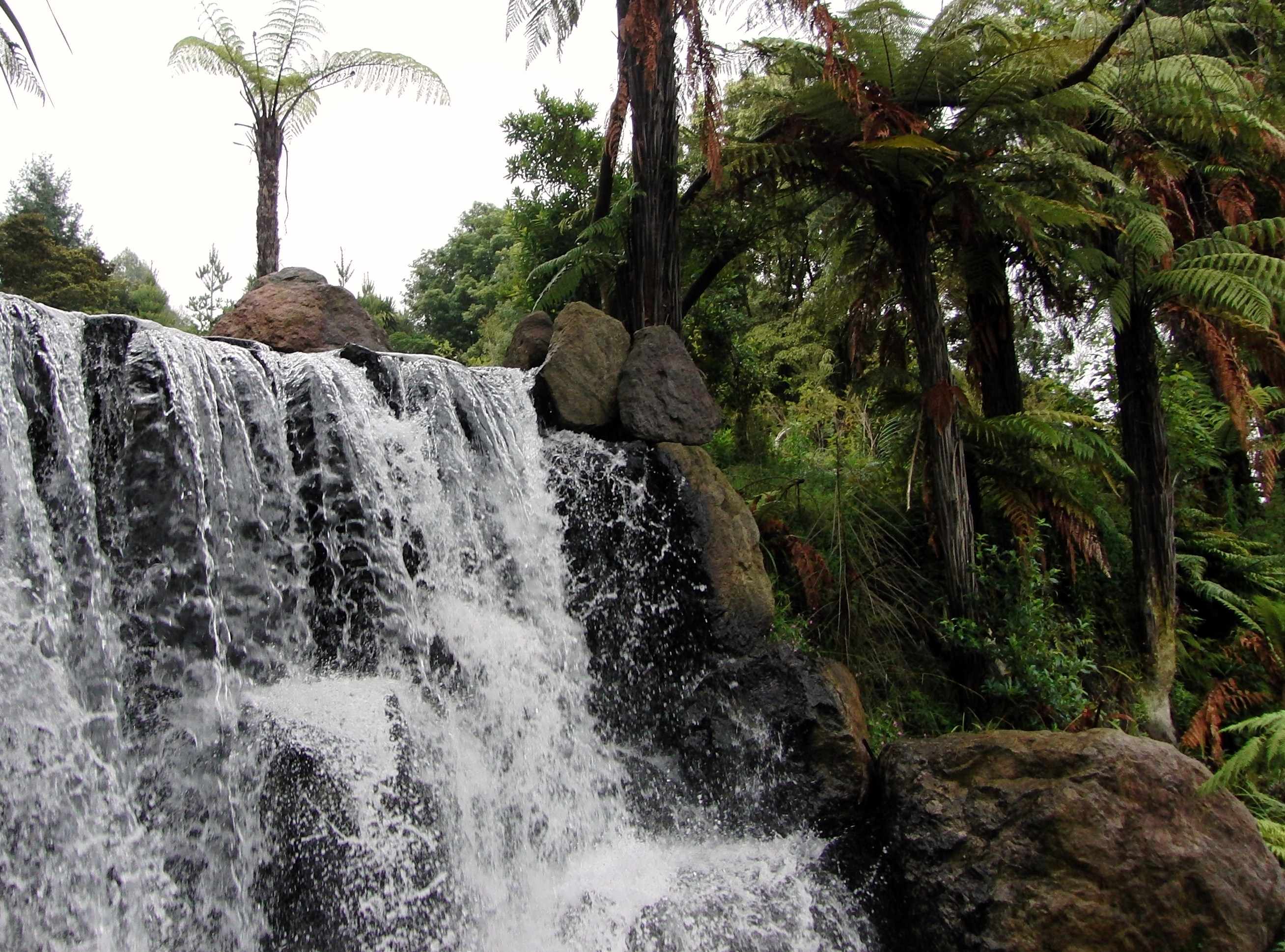
Lake Ngakoro Waterfall

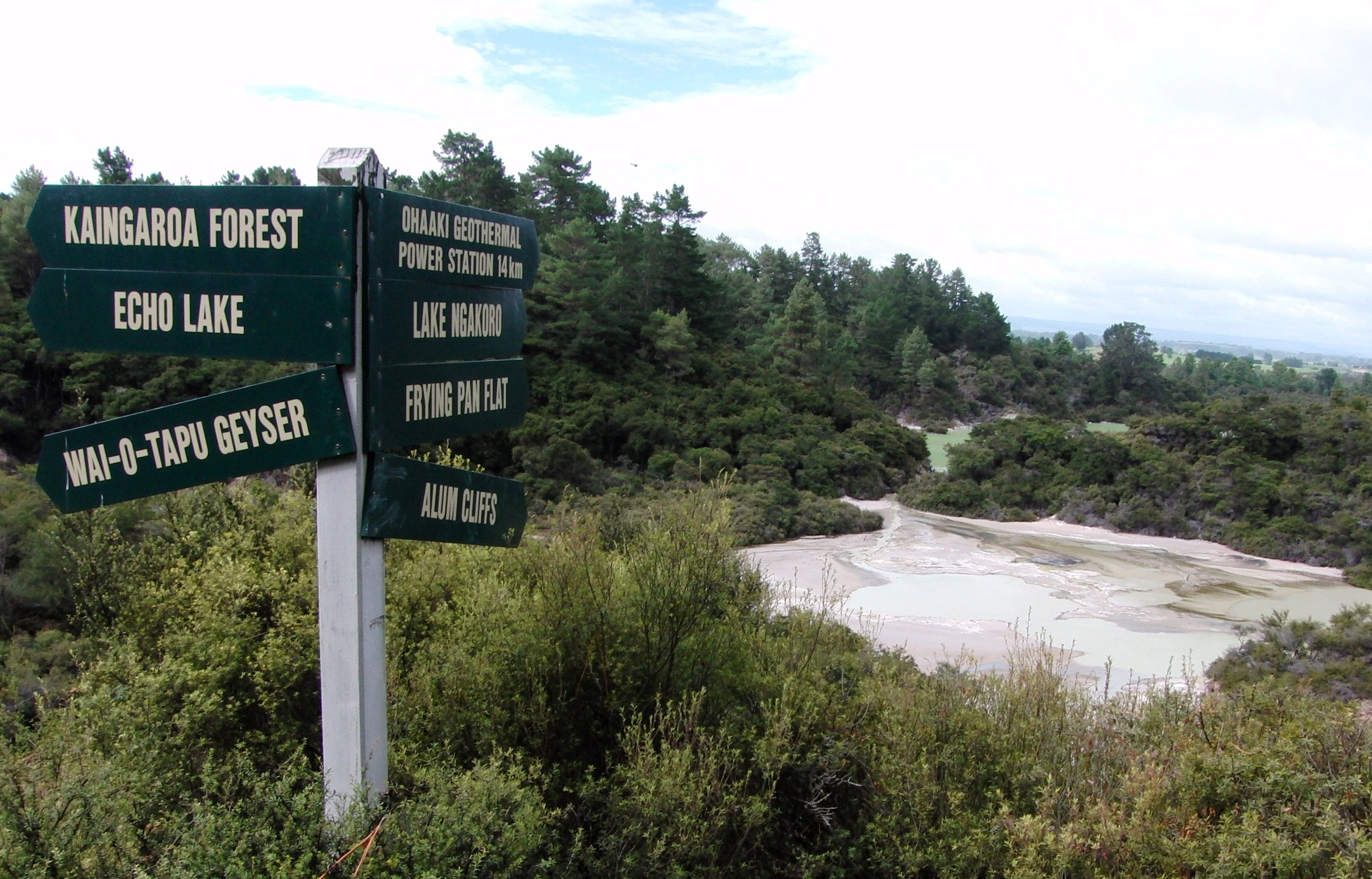
Lake Ngakoro

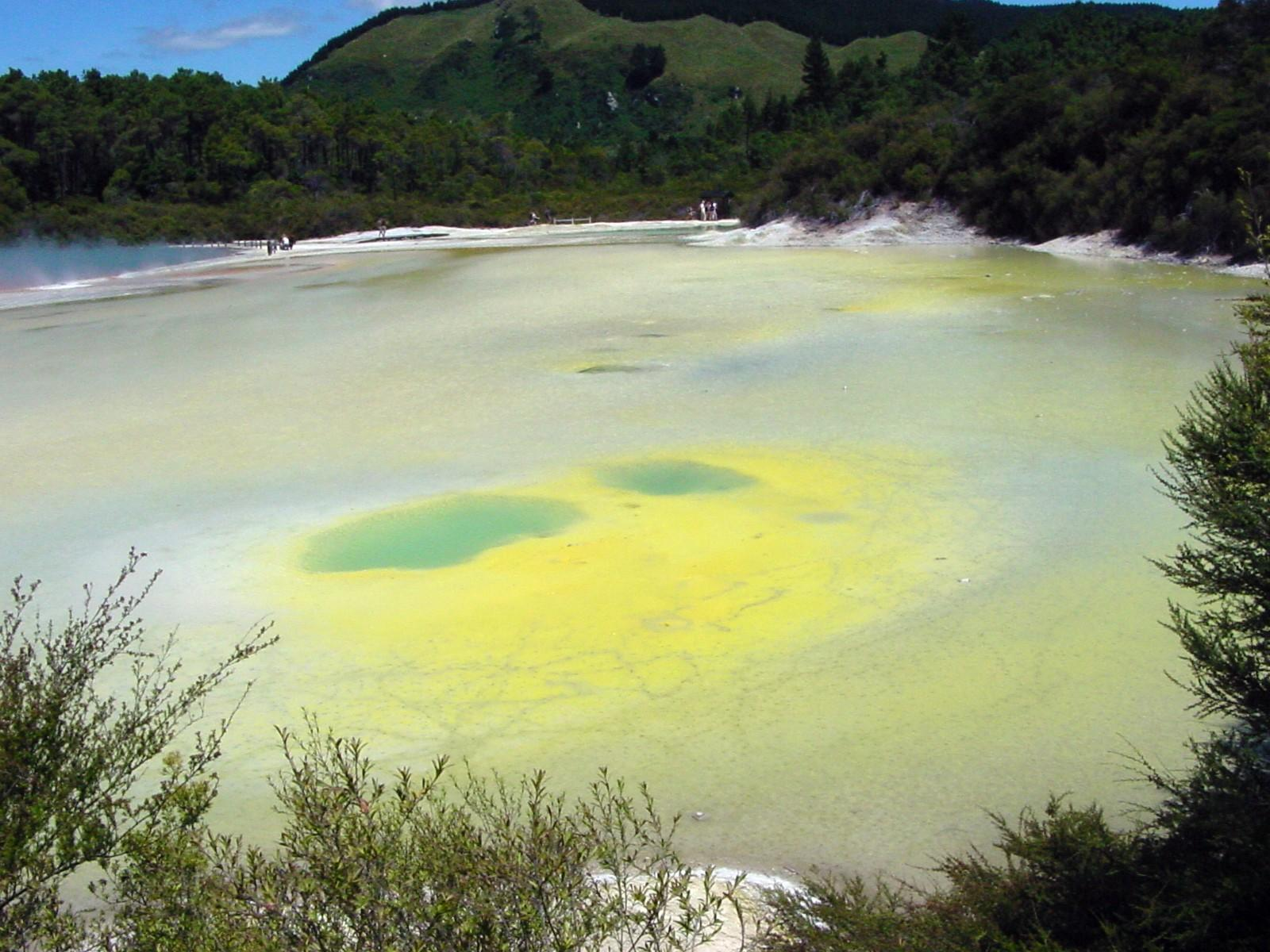
Artist's Palette

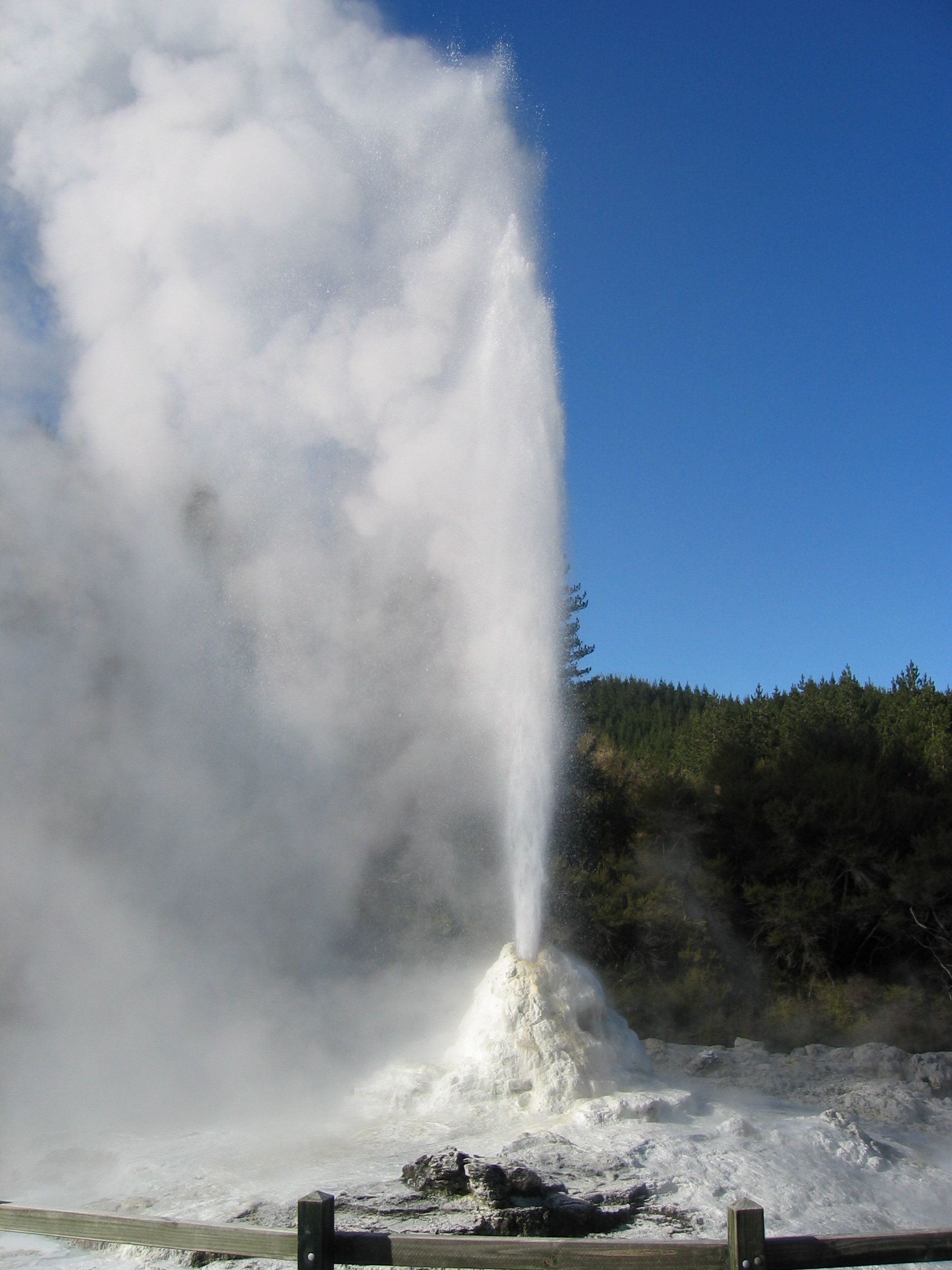
Lady Knox Geyser erupting

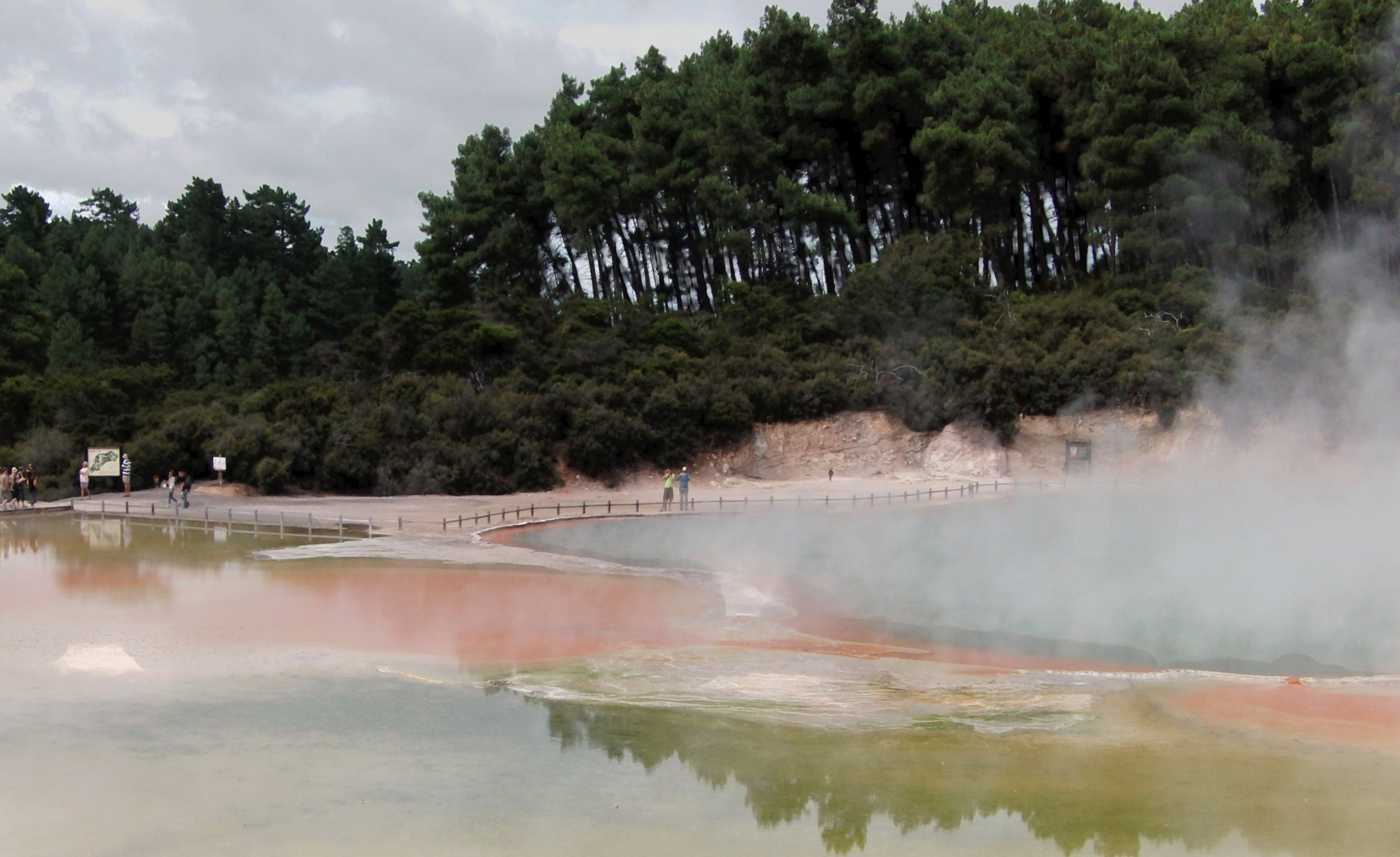
Artist's Palette

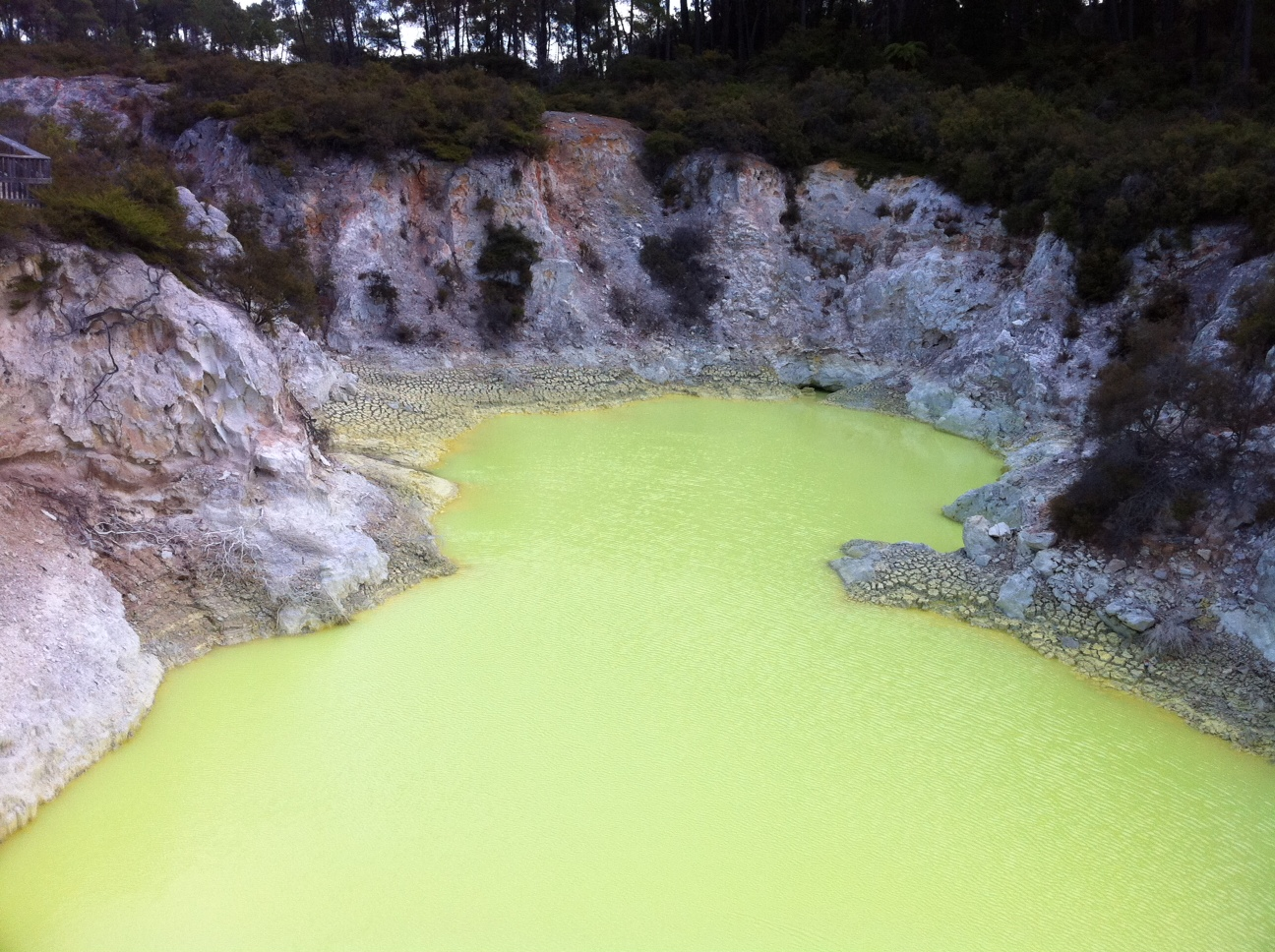
Water pond made yellow by sulfur

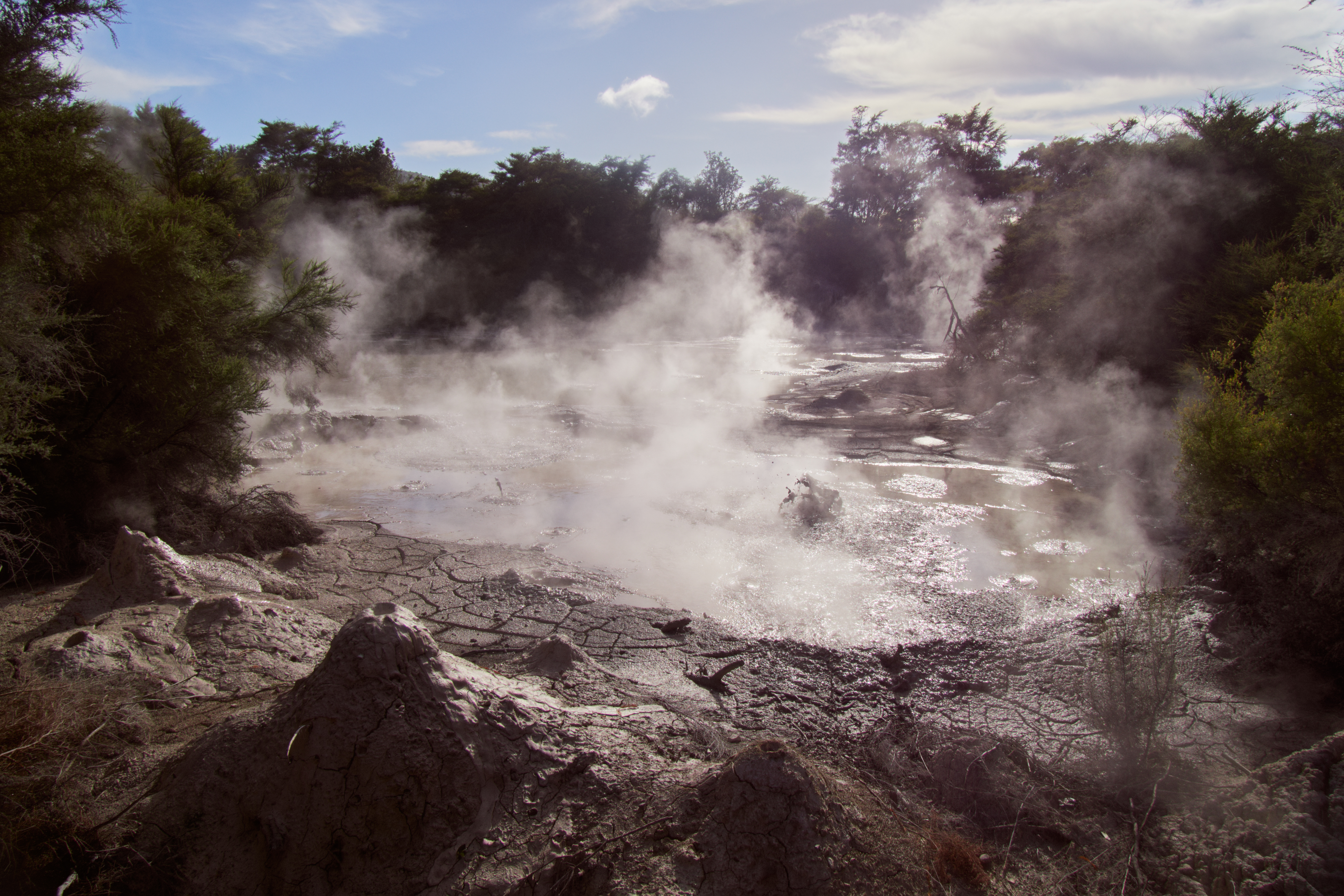
Boiling mud pools

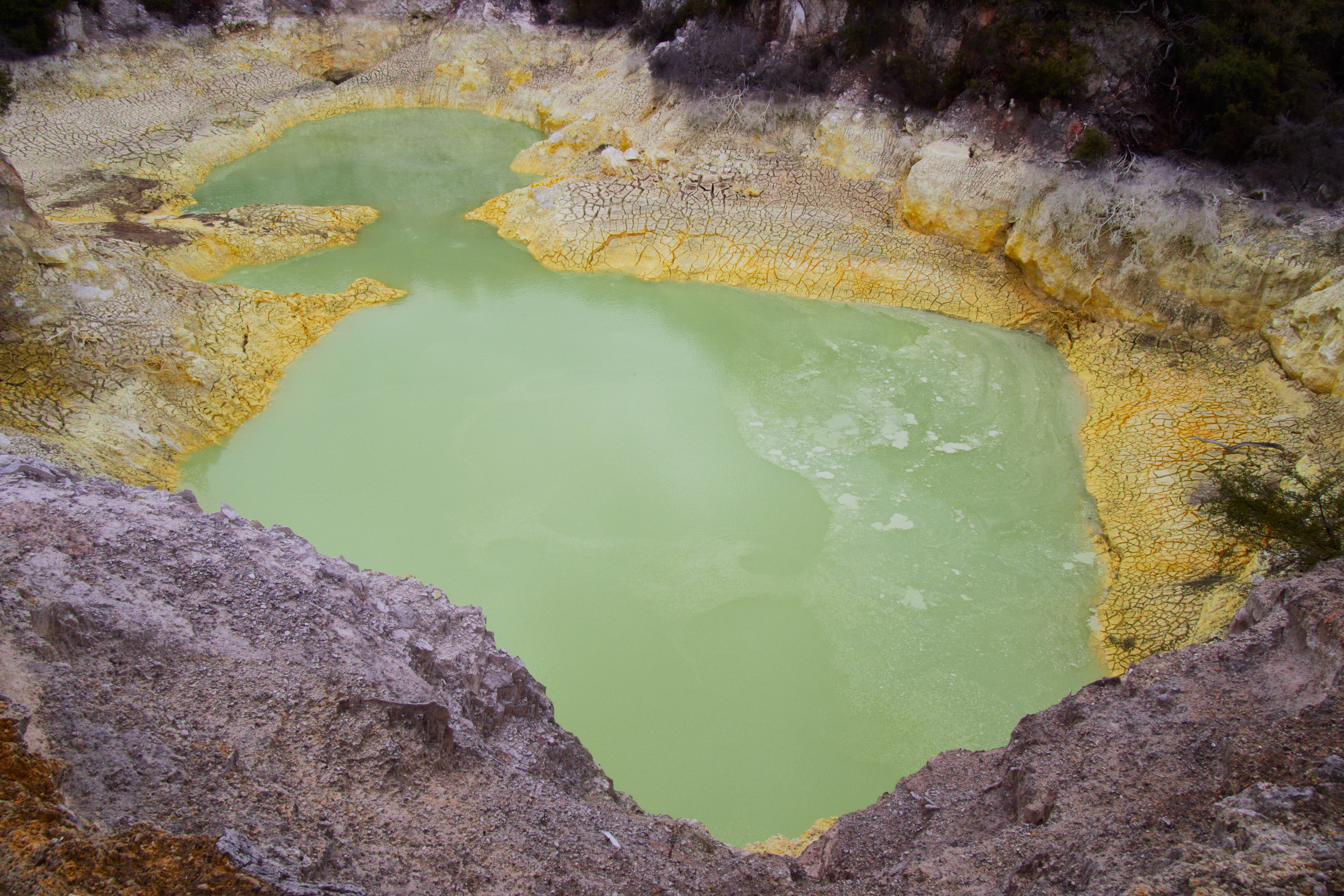
Devil's Bath, on an overcast day

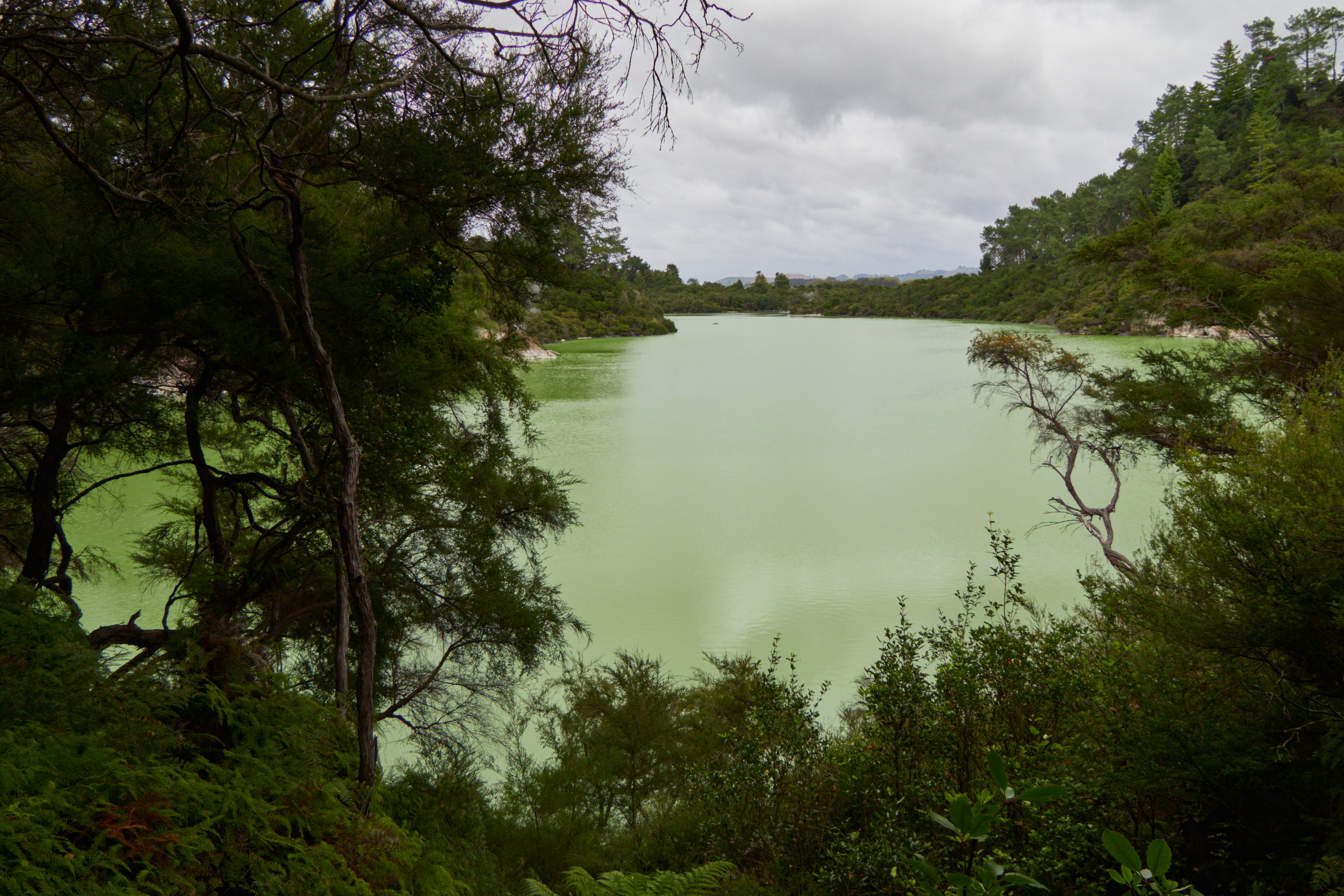
Lake Ngakoro

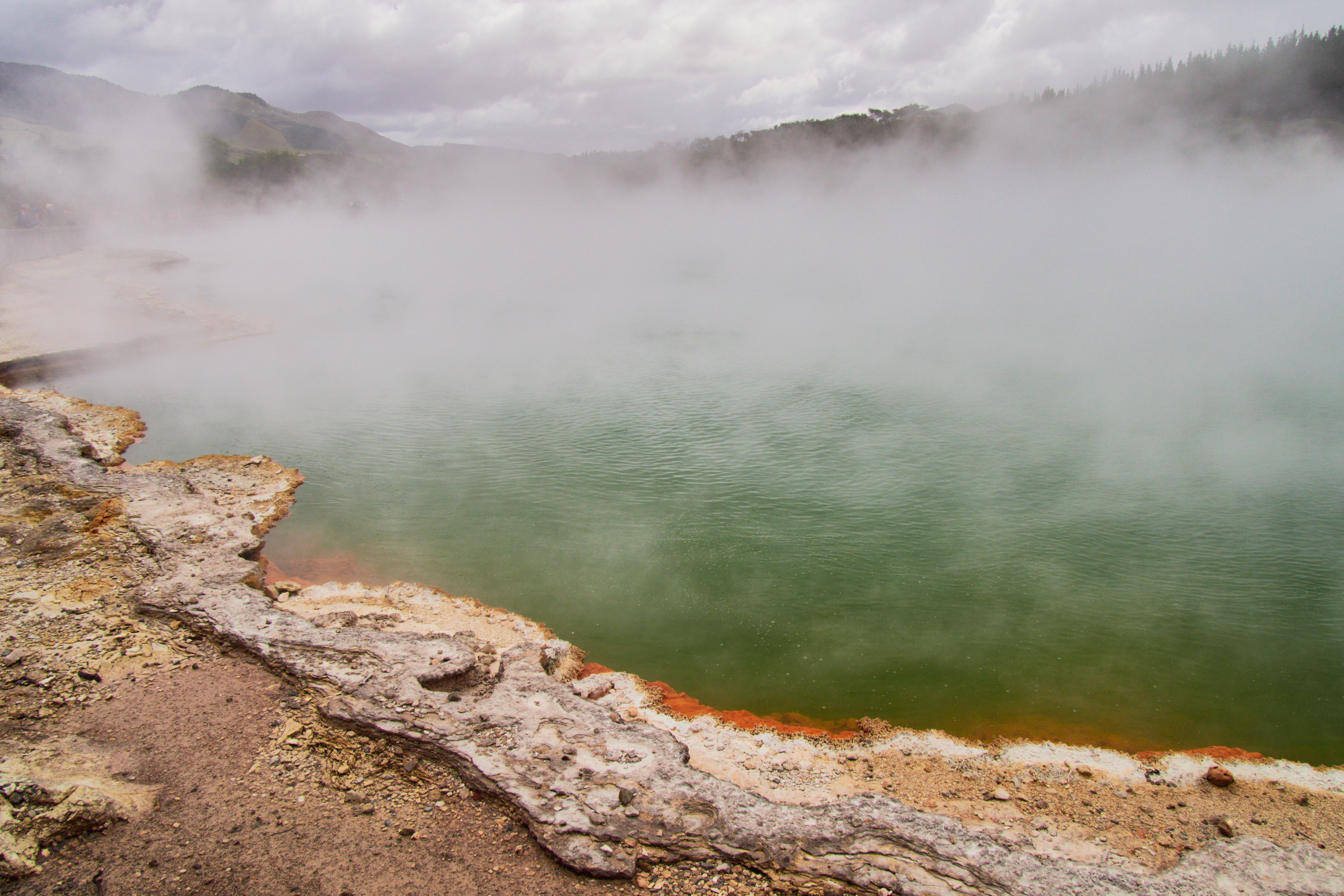
The Champagne Pool

== See also ==
- List of hot springs
- Hot springs in New Zealand
