= Mōrere =

Locality in Wairoa District, Hawke's Bay Region, New Zealand

Coordinates: 38°59′S 177°47′E

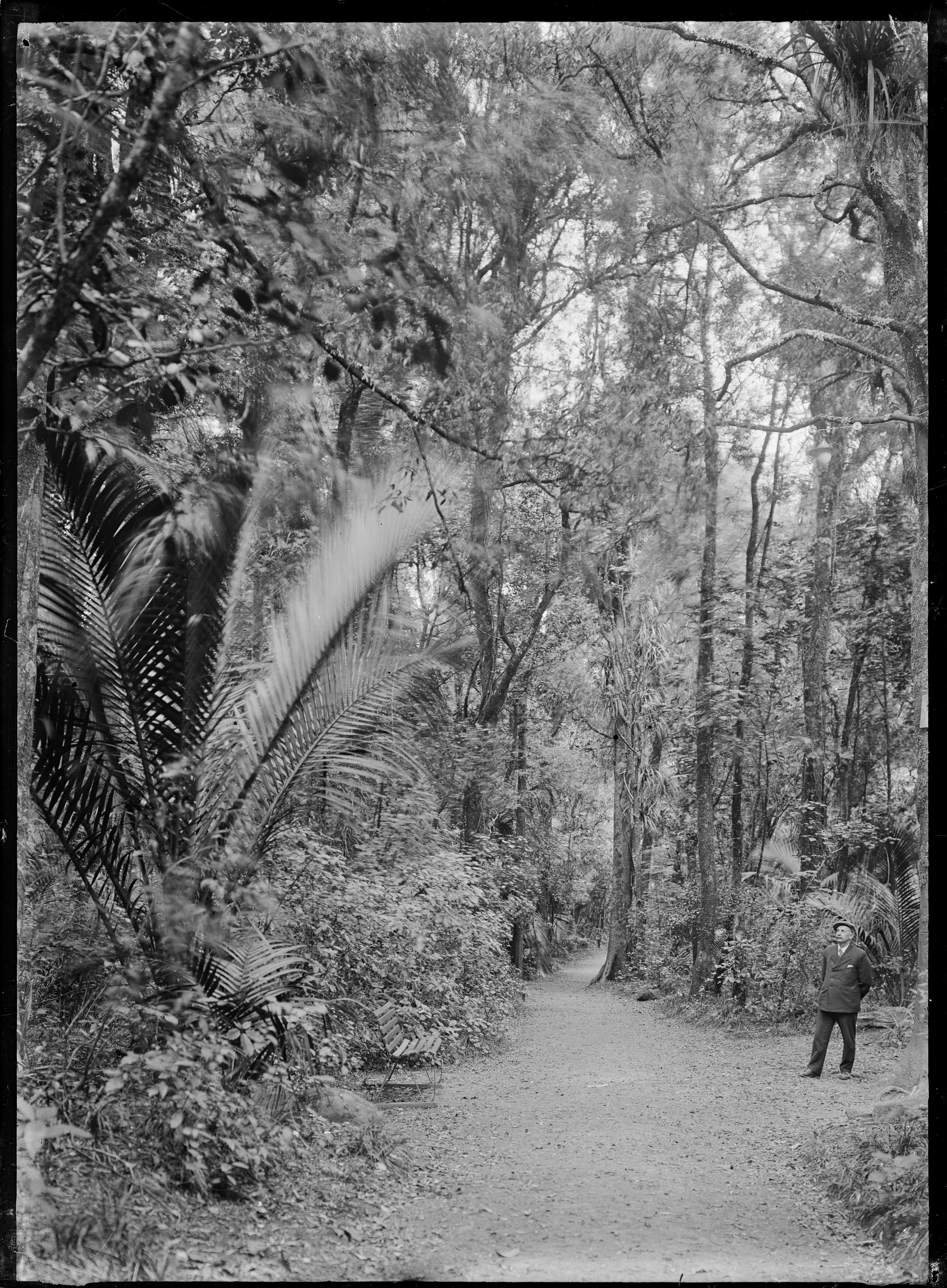

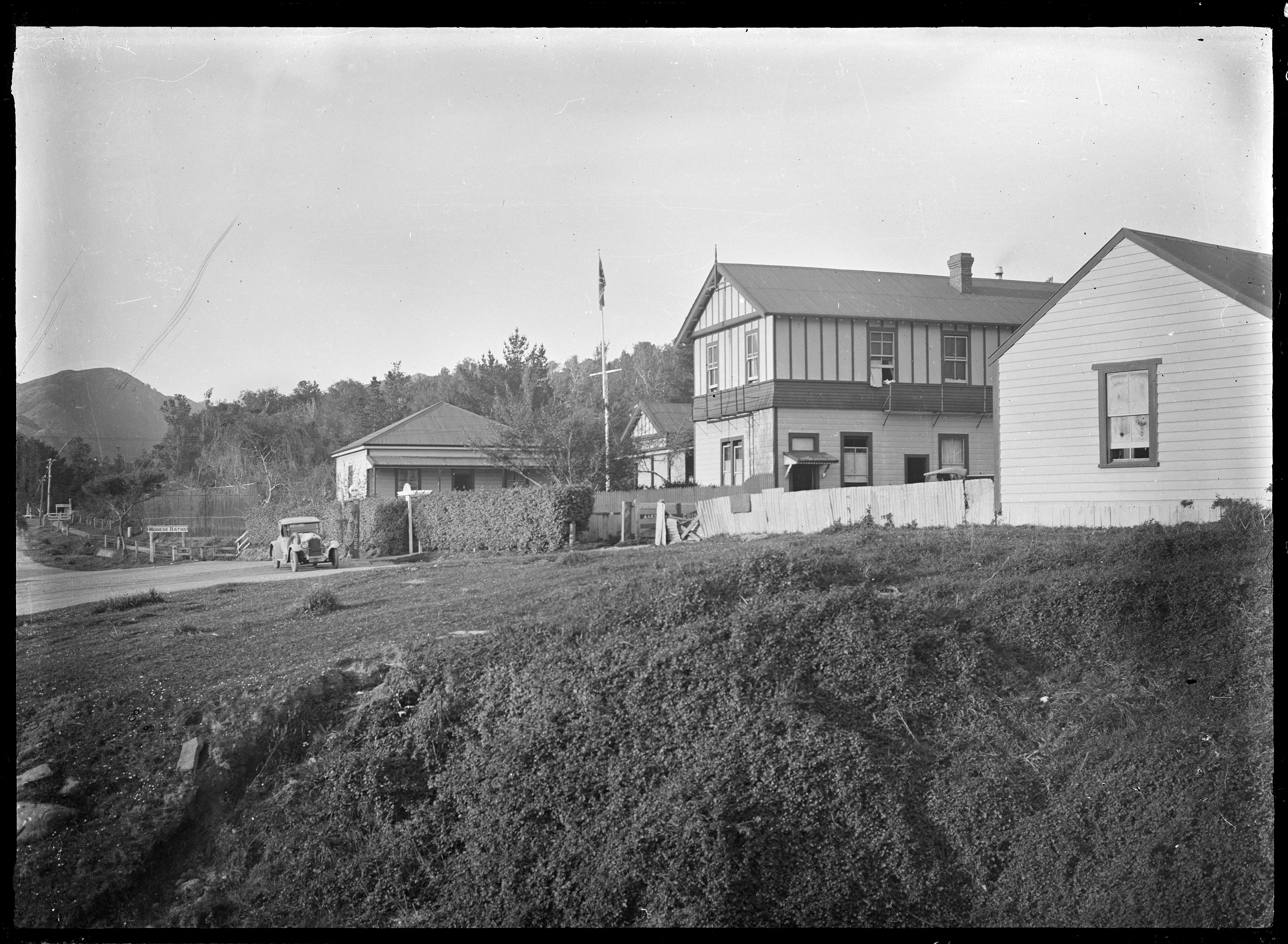
Hot Springs Hotel at Morere, 1927

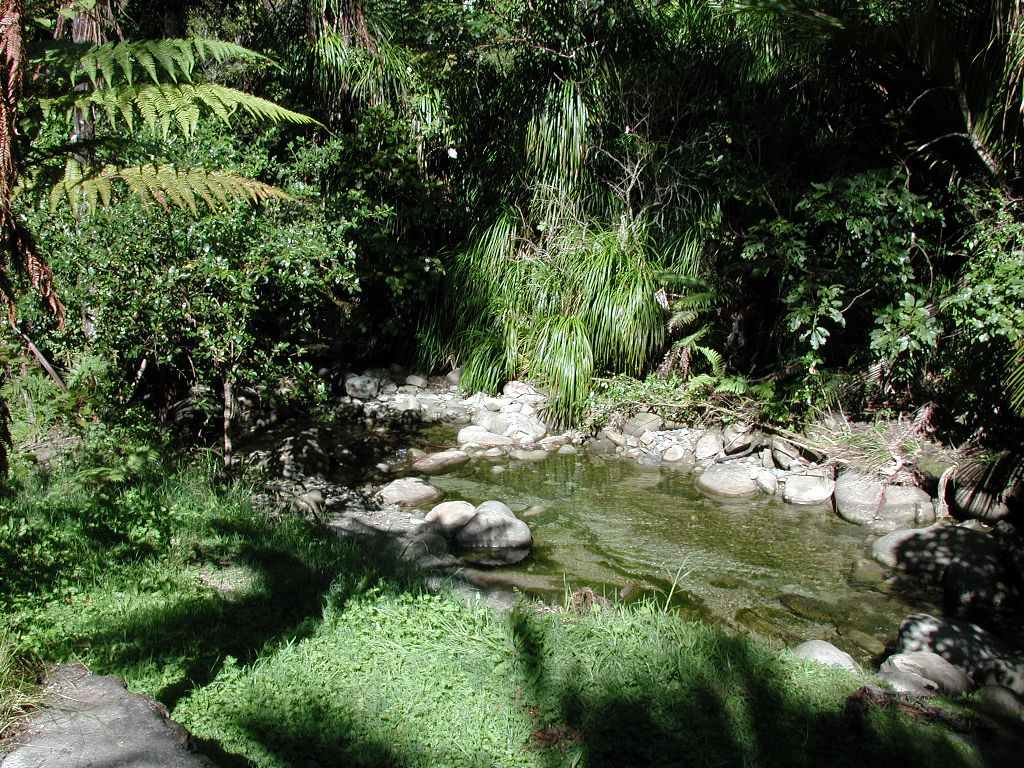
Scenery at Morere Reserve

Mōrere is a sparsely populated area in New Zealand that is home to the Morere Hot Springs and Morere Springs Scenic Reserve with trails through nikau palm habitat. Morere is in the area of Hawkes Bay on the North Island.
