= Lady Knox Geyser =

Geyser in Waiotapu, New Zealand

Coordinates: 38°21′3″S 176°22′37″E

Lady Knox Geyser

The Lady Knox Geyser is a geyser in the Waiotapu area of the Taupō Volcanic Zone in New Zealand. It is named after Lady Constance Knox, the second daughter of Uchter Knox, 15th Governor of New Zealand. The geyser is induced to erupt daily at 10:15 am by dropping a surfactant into the opening of the vent. Eruptions produce a jet of water reaching up to 20m and can last for over an hour, depending on the weather. The visible spout is made of rocks placed around the base of the spring to enhance the eruption; over the years silica from the eruptions has built up to give a white cone-shaped appearance.

Because the geyser was discovered early in the 20th century, it has no Māori name, unlike almost every other thermal feature in New Zealand.

== Discovery ==
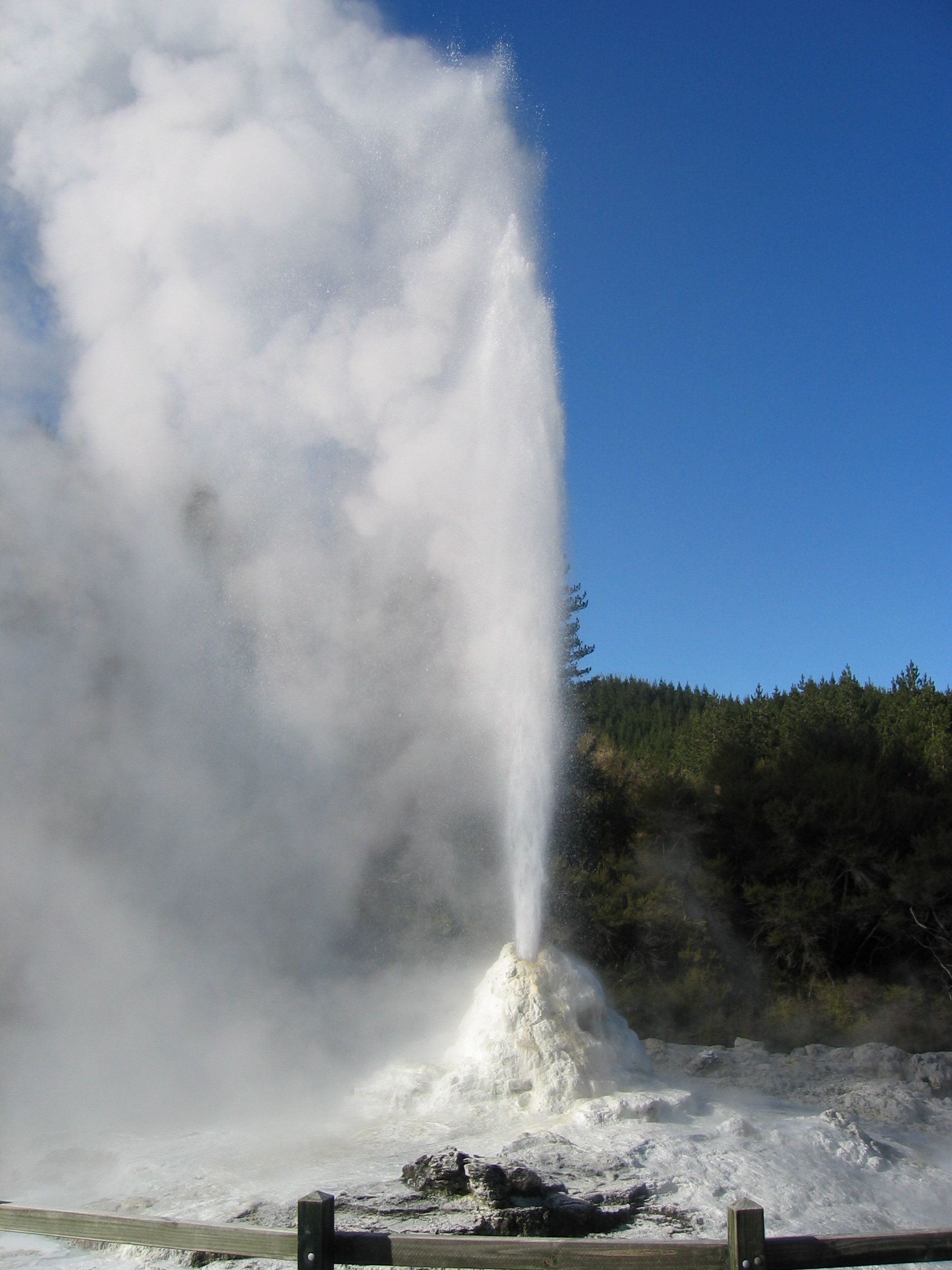
Lady Knox Geyser erupting

In 1901, the first open prison in New Zealand was established at Waiotapu, its object to accommodate some of the better-behaved prisoners from around the jails of the Rotorua Lakes District.

It was a gang of those prisoners who first discovered the clearing in which the geyser is situated and that the spring could be made to erupt by adding soap, discovered when they first added soap to the hot water to wash their clothes.
