= Craters of the Moon (geothermal site) =

Geothermal site in New Zealand

Coordinates: 38°38.8′S 176°4.1′E

Craters of the Moon Thermal Area (or Karapiti in Māori language) is a region with geothermal activity north of Taupō, New Zealand. It is a part of Wairakei, the largest geothermal field in New Zealand, with a surface area of about 25 km^{2}, which lies in the Taupō Volcanic Zone. The name springs from the many hydrothermal eruption craters, which are in part barren and which have bright colours. Combined with the numerous steam vents, constantly shifting, collapsing and reforming giving the whole area desolate appearance, and the sulphur smell, the whole area has an "unearthly" atmosphere. The craters are a relatively recent feature of the area and appeared as a result of human activity in the region.

The site is Crown land, administered by the Department of Conservation, with help from the Craters of the Moon Trust, a volunteer organisation that provides information for visitors and passive vehicle security.

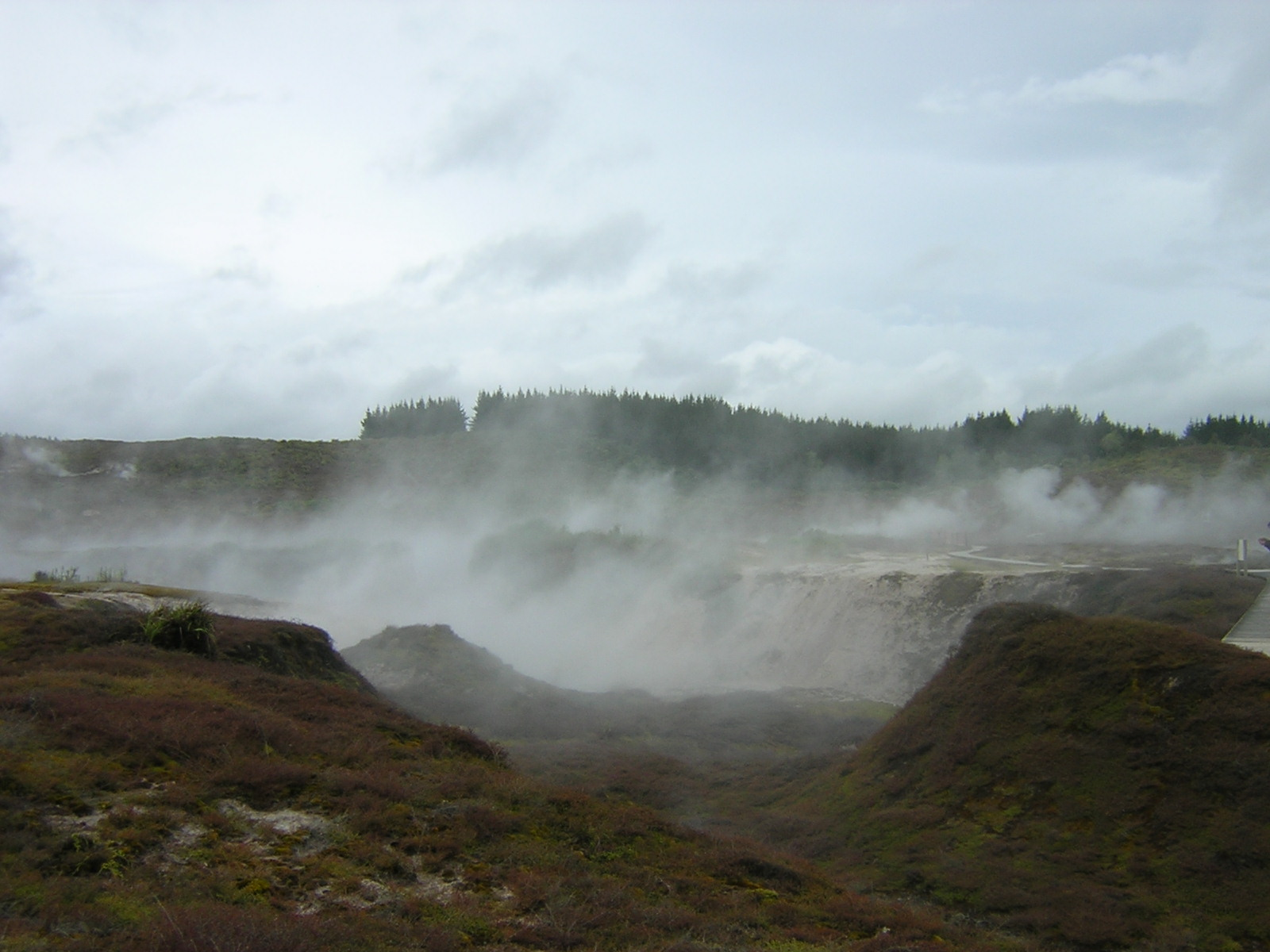
Steam vents at Craters of the Moon

== History ==
In 1859 Ferdinand von Hochstetter, an Austrian geologist who travelled through the area, reported a colossal column of steam from the Karapiti Blowhole (fumarole), observable from about 20 km away. It was difficult to approach because steam vents and springs covered the valley floor and the ground was warm, soft, iron-stained clay for great distances around. By the beginning of the 20th century the blowhole was a tourist attraction, albeit not of the level of the nearby Wairakei Geyser Valley. It is worthwhile reading the "Impression of a Trip" in 1927, in which the Karapiti Blowhole is named "the safety valve of the North Island":

After dinner (which was served at 6 p.m.) we took our seats in the car which went to Karapeeti (the safety valve of the North Island) and the "Huka" falls, a little higher up the Waikato.
Karapeeti blow hole is an escaping volume of superheated steam with a pressure of 180 lbs. to the square inch coming through an aperture two feet by one foot. The guide lit a sack sprinkled with kerosene so that the visitors could see the escaping steam in the darkness and after the sack had partly burnt away he picked it up on a stick and shook the burning pieces down into the blow hole. These were immediately carried up in the jet of steam and presented a very weird fireworks effect, the sparks remaining alight, proving that it was super-heated or dry steam. This blow hole, according to Maori tradition, has been constant for the last 200 years and the Maoris of the early days of New Zealand used this column of steam as a beacon to guide them with their canoes across Lake Taupo which is six miles distant.

An information leaflet of New Zealand Railways of 1940 speaks about the "Inferno of Karapiti". The phenomenon was usually viewed at night. A piece of smouldering sacking was applied to the blowhole. Then the "jet, filled with smoke and burning shreds becomes a whirling inverted cone flashing with thousands of yellow sparks in a brilliant pyrotechnic display".

In 1950 the area was described as being mostly warm clay with small patches of hot ground and mudpools. "The Karapiti Blowhole was still impressive, though apparently much less intense than when Hochstetter saw it".

A most important change in the region has been the building of the Wairakei Power Station (150 MW) in the 1950s, about 2 km north of the field. This reduced the pressure in the hot water systems below the earth surface. Since then much of the geothermal activity in the region has dramatically changed, as did the geothermal activity at Craters of the Moon. The geysers at Wairakei Geyser Valley totally disappeared, but the heat output at Craters of the Moon increased. A lot of hydrothermal eruptions occurred, which formed the craters.

In 1950, the total heat output at Craters of the Moon was about 40 MW (megawatts). By 1958, it had increased to about 90 MW. In 1964 it was 420 MW. After 1964 the output declined to about 220 MW in 1979. The most recent estimate being about 200 MW in 2000.

Heat output from the Karapiti Blowhole followed a similar pattern. In the 1950 it was 12 MW. It increased to a maximum of about 38 MW during the mid 1960s. Then it dropped to about 7 MW in 1978. The blowhole finally ceased altogether in 1987.

== Features ==
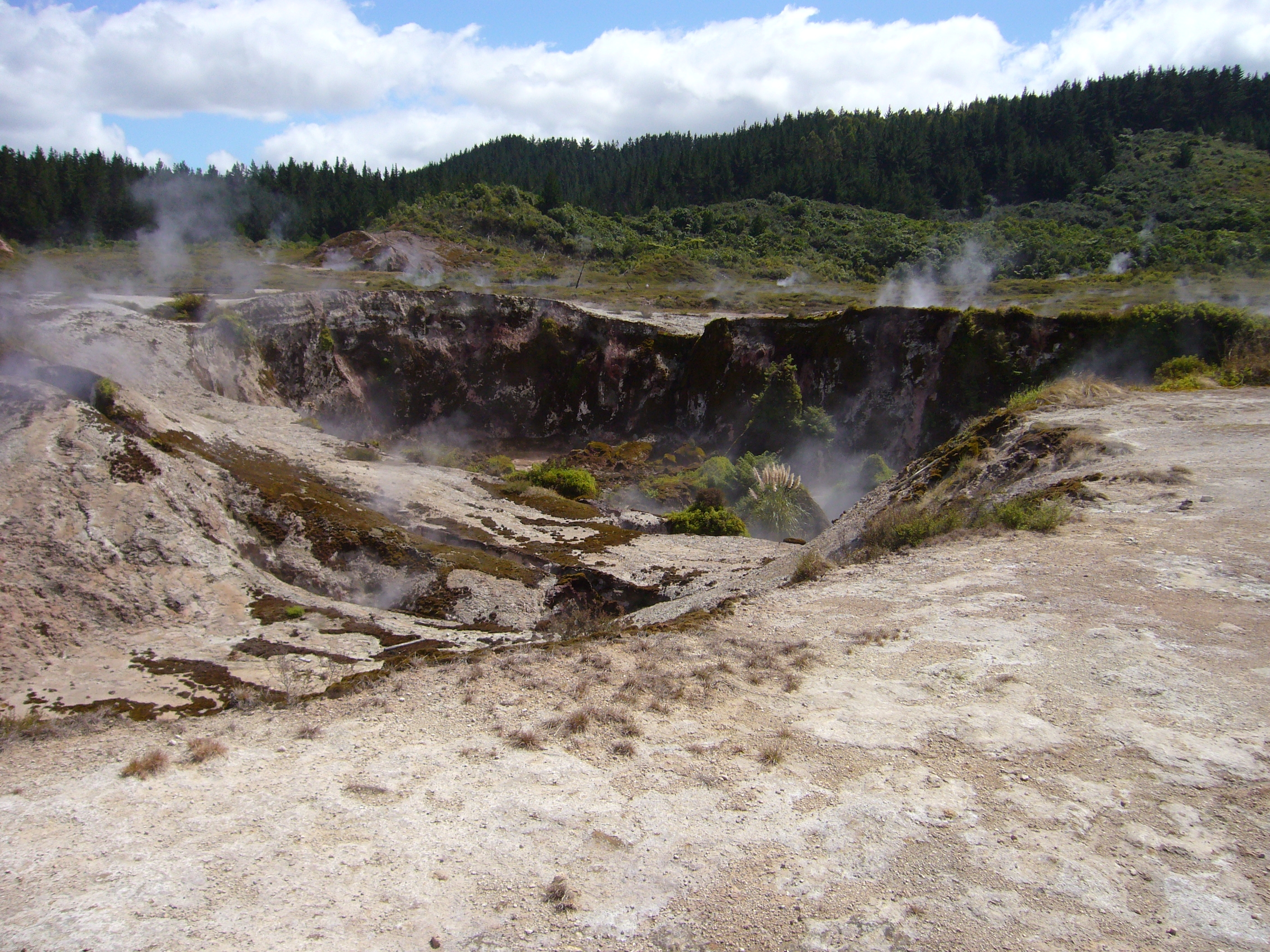
Geothermal eruption crater

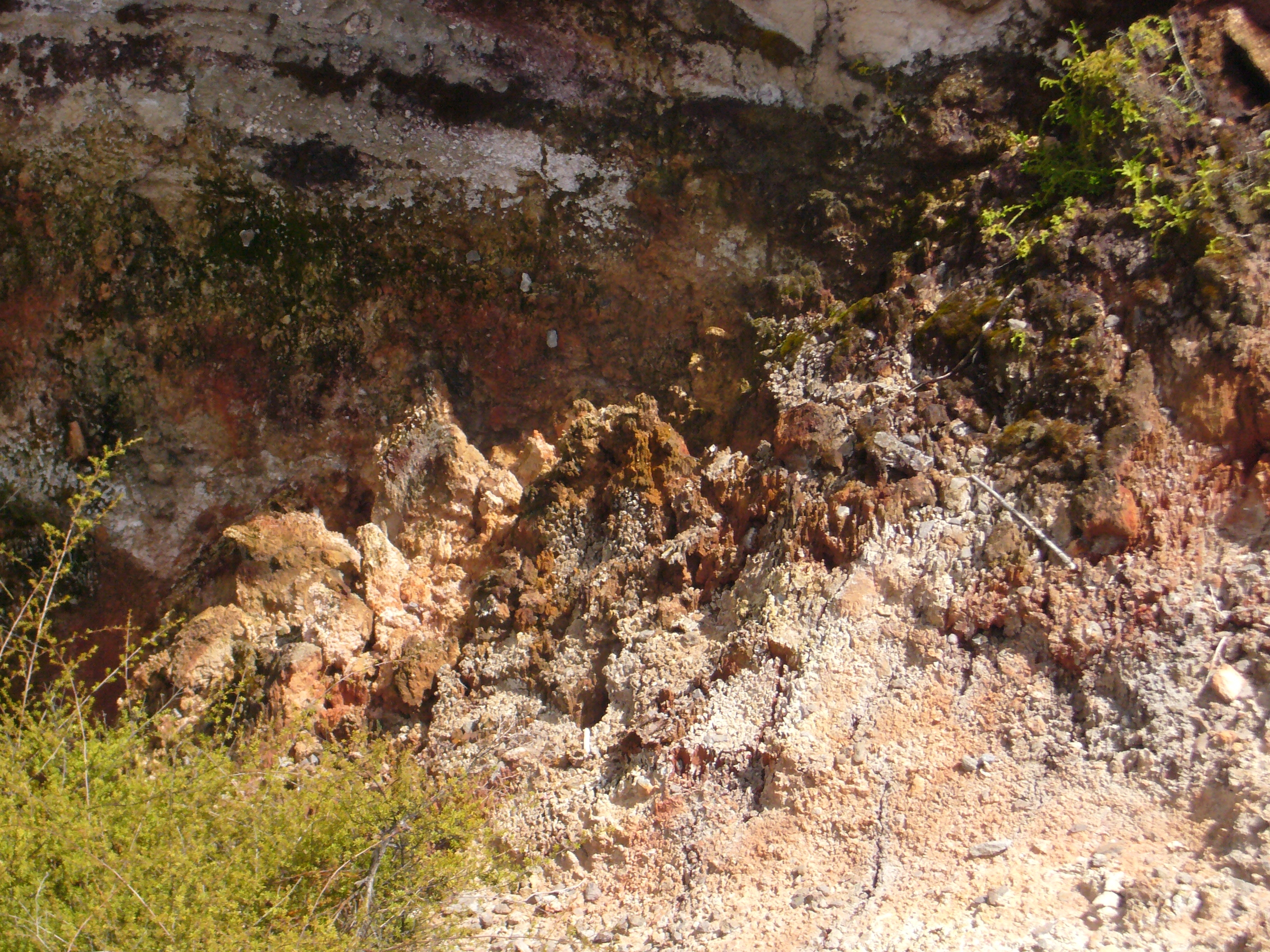
Colourful border of crater

Craters of the Moon is a steam field with a total of about 36 hectares (0.36 km^{2}) of heated ground. It has an average altitude of 435 m. As well as craters, it has fumaroles ("blowholes") and a mudpool. Vegetation is quite uncommon around the area of the Craters of the Moon.

All the craters at The Craters of the Moon are the result of hydrothermal eruptions. The pressure of the steam beneath the surface exceeds the pressure exerted by the weight of the overlying ground. This results in an explosion. A mixture of hot water, steam, hot mud and pumice is ejected into the air. Material may be blown up to 100 m, leaving behind holes or craters as deep as 20 m. Hydrothermal eruptions occur about once a year.

The openings in the earth surface, where geothermal steam and gases are emitted, are fumaroles. They vary in size from one centimetre to half a metre in diameter. The most powerful fumarole observed at Craters of the Moon occurred December 1967. It had a heat output of 116 MW.

Only one of the craters now has a mudpool. Here the gases (mainly H_{2}S) react with water to form sulphuric acid. This reacts with the rocks, turning it to clay. When water is present, this forms the grey coloured mudpools "that bubble and burp as steam and gas escape through them".

== Vegetation ==
Much of the ground at Craters of the Moon is warm or hot, which affects the vegetation. Only few species can survive. One is the prostrate kānuka, a variety of kānuka (Kunzea ericoides var. microflora). Other species include ferns and mosses that usually grow only in the tropics or warmer frost-free climates.

== Visitor access ==
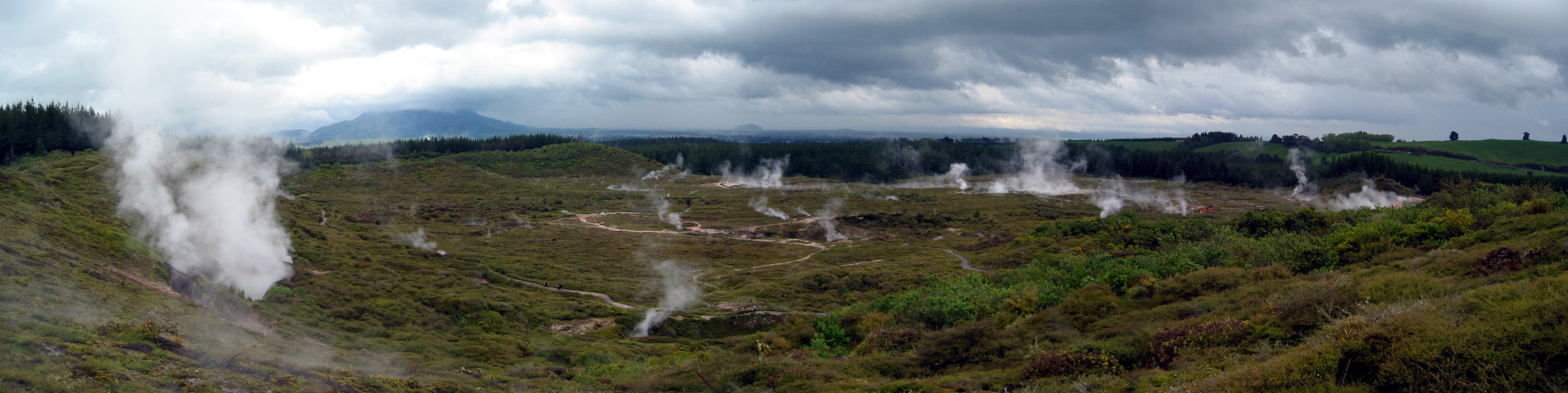
Crater with steaming ground and fumaroles

Craters of the Moon is open to visitors all year round. The area is easily reached by car from Taupō, being on the end of Karapiti Road, that branches off State Highway 1/5, 4 km north of Taupō. There is a carpark, and an information kiosk at the entrance. An entrance fee applies.

Visitors can walk a main track circuit, suited for people of all ages and fitness levels, which is also wheelchair accessible. This loop takes 45 minutes to walk. A steeper loop, taking an additional 20 minutes, climbs to a viewing point. Due to the somewhat poisonous fumes and the fact that ground temperatures around steam vents can reach dangerous levels, the paths and board walkways that allow access to the field are relaid at irregular intervals to bypass them.

== Craters of the Moon Trust ==
In 1991 the constant break-ins in cars at the rather isolated car park caused local solicitor Jeremy Nash to seek volunteers to maintain passive security. In that same year a first kiosk was built near the entrance. In 2000 a bigger kiosk was opened. In 2000 the Trust opened a similar kiosk and passive vehicle security at the famous Huka Falls.

== Literature ==
- Given, David R. "Vegetation on heated soils at Karapiti, central North Island, New Zealand, and its relation to ground temperature". New Zealand Journal of Botany, 1980, vol. 18: 1–13
- Mongillo, M. A. Karapiti: Craters of the Moon Thermal Area. Pirongia: What’s the Story Publications, 2003. ISBN 0-473-09142-9
