= Geothermal activity =

Activity resulting from underground heat

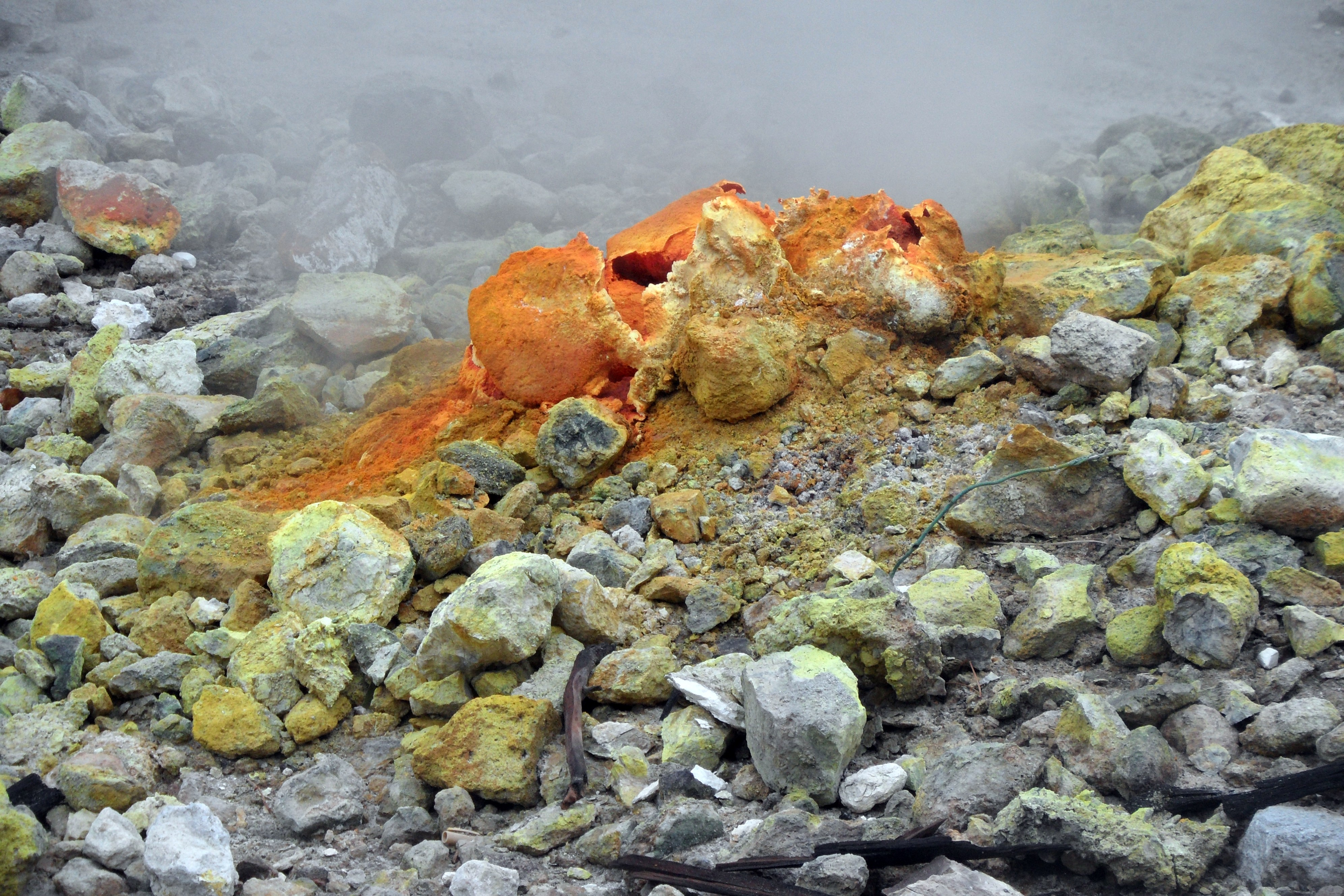
A fumarole in the Solfatara crater, the orange and yellow colouration is from minerals that are deposited by the superheated fumes as they cool to ambient temperature.

Geothermal activity is a group of natural heat transfer processes, occurring on Earth's surface, caused by the presence of excess heat in the subsurface of the affected area, usually caused by the presence of an igneous intrusion underground. Geothermal activity can manifest itself in a variety of different phenomena, including, among others, elevated surface temperatures, various forms of hydrothermal activity, and the presence of fumaroles that emit hot volcanic gases.

== Background physics ==
Geothermal activity mostly appears in volcanic provinces, where it is fueled by the presence of a magma chamber. In some rare cases it can be caused by underground fires or by large deposits of radioactive elements. Other sources of internal heating can be gravitational differentiation of substances, tidal friction, metamorphism, or phase transitions. The release of heat to the surface occurs either in the form of a conductive heat flow, or in the form of convective heat transfer by groundwater or gases.

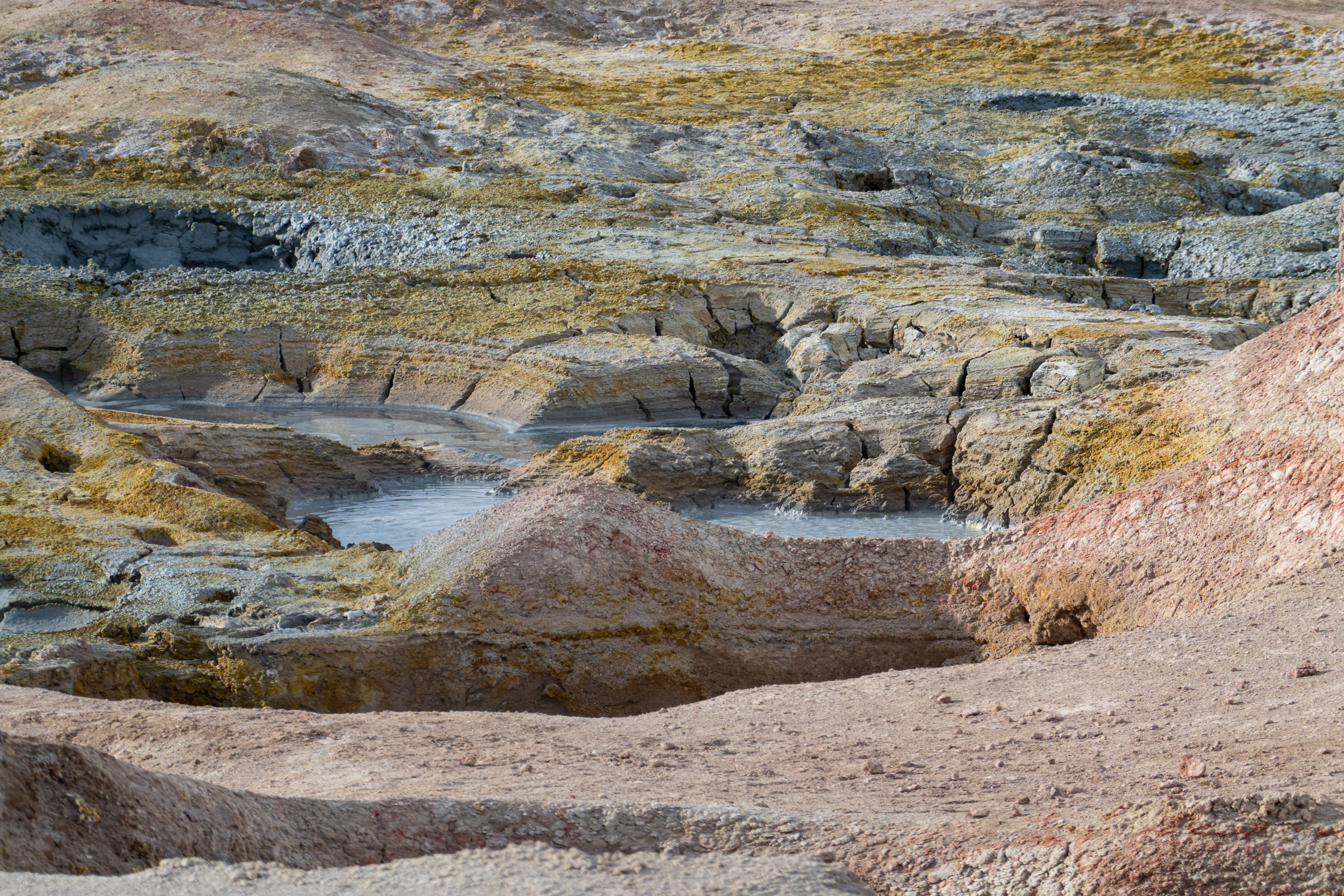
Mud pots in the Sol de Mañana Hydrothermal field, Bolivia. The yellow coloring in the soil derives from deposits of sulfur.

== Types of geothermal activity ==
=== Fumaroles and vents ===
Fumaroles, or volcanic vents, are holes in the ground from which volcanic vapors and gases escape to the atmosphere. Geothermally active areas are often located over an active magma chamber, which constantly releases hot gases that travel to the surface through cavities in the rock. Where these cavities reach the surface they form fumaroles. Areas where these vents are concentrated are known as Fumarole fields. Fumaroles tend to form concentrated deposits of sulfuric minerals, which fall out of suspension when the volcanic gases cool to the air.

=== Ice cauldrons ===
Ice cauldrons are a feature that occurs when an ice cap is affected by geothermal heating, either from active volcanism or the continuous heat production from an active geothermal area. Ice cauldrons can have many different appearances. These range from a smooth dent in the ice cap to deep holes with very steep walls formed by concentric rings of crevasses. The width of ice cauldrons can range from 50 meters up to around 10 kilometers, while depth can range from several meters to hundreds of meters. The shape of the cauldron can be stable or highly variable, and is not related to the nature of the underlying heat source.

== Hydrothermal activity ==
Geothermal heat and groundwater can interact in several ways.

=== Geysers ===
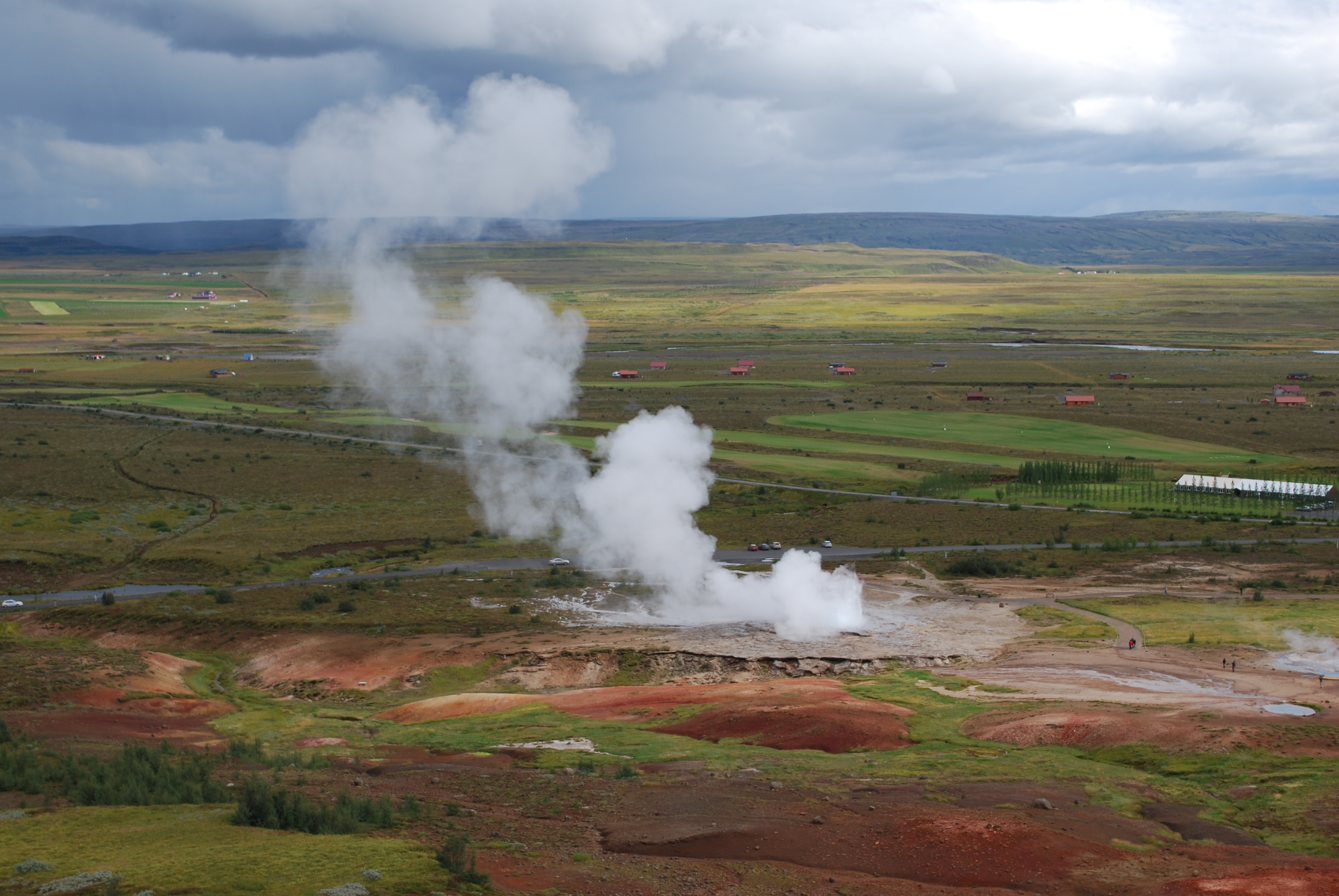
Geysir, a geyser in Iceland, after which the phenomenon is named.

Geysers are the most well known hydrothermal feature. They occur when groundwater in underground cavities becomes superheated under a lid of colder surface water. When the superheated water breaches the surface, it flashes to steam, causing the pressure below it to suddenly drop, which causes a chain reaction where most of the water in the geyser's feed system flashes to steam all at once.

There are two main types of geyser. Fountain geysers, which erupt in violent bursts from a pool, and cone geysers, which erupt in steady jets for minutes at a time from a sinter cone of siliceous material that has been deposited surrounding the main vent.

=== Hot springs and mud pots ===
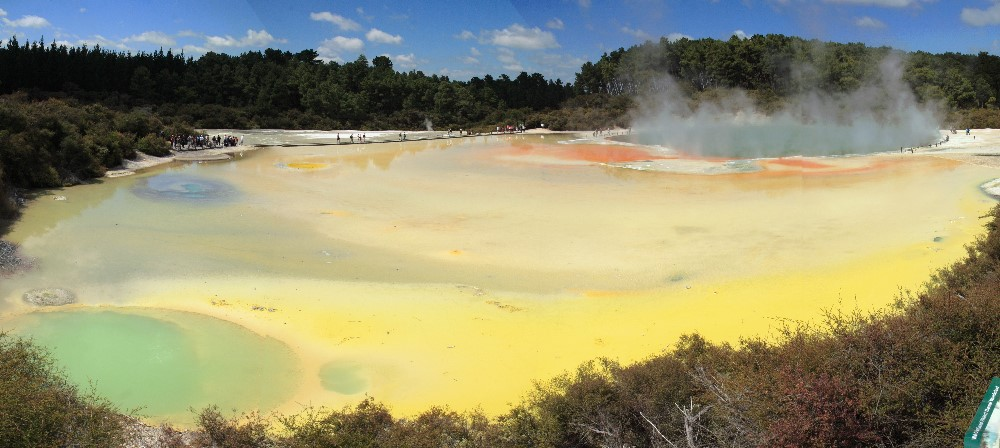
Two Hot springs in Waiotapu, New Zealand, with Artist's Palette in the foreground, and Champagne Pool directly behind it in the background.

In other areas, the heated groundwater gathers in pools, forming hot springs. Where very little groundwater is available, rising hot groundwater in combination with microbial activity leads to the formation of mud pots. The behaviour of these mud pots can vary on a seasonal cycle based on variations in the amount of rainfall and the level of the water table.

=== Hydrothermal explosions ===
Hydrothermal explosions occur when a mass of superheated water is unable to reach the surface, causing pressure underground to rise until a critical point is reached and an explosion occurs, ejecting the superheated water along with the rock.

== See also ==
- Geothermal energy – Thermal energy generated and stored in the Earth
- Geothermal gradient – Rate of temperature increase with depth in Earth's interior
- Geothermal heating – Use of geothermal energy for heating
- Geothermal power – Power generated by geothermal energy
