= Maunga Kākaramea =

Volcano in New Zealand

Maunga Kākaramea (Rainbow Mountain)
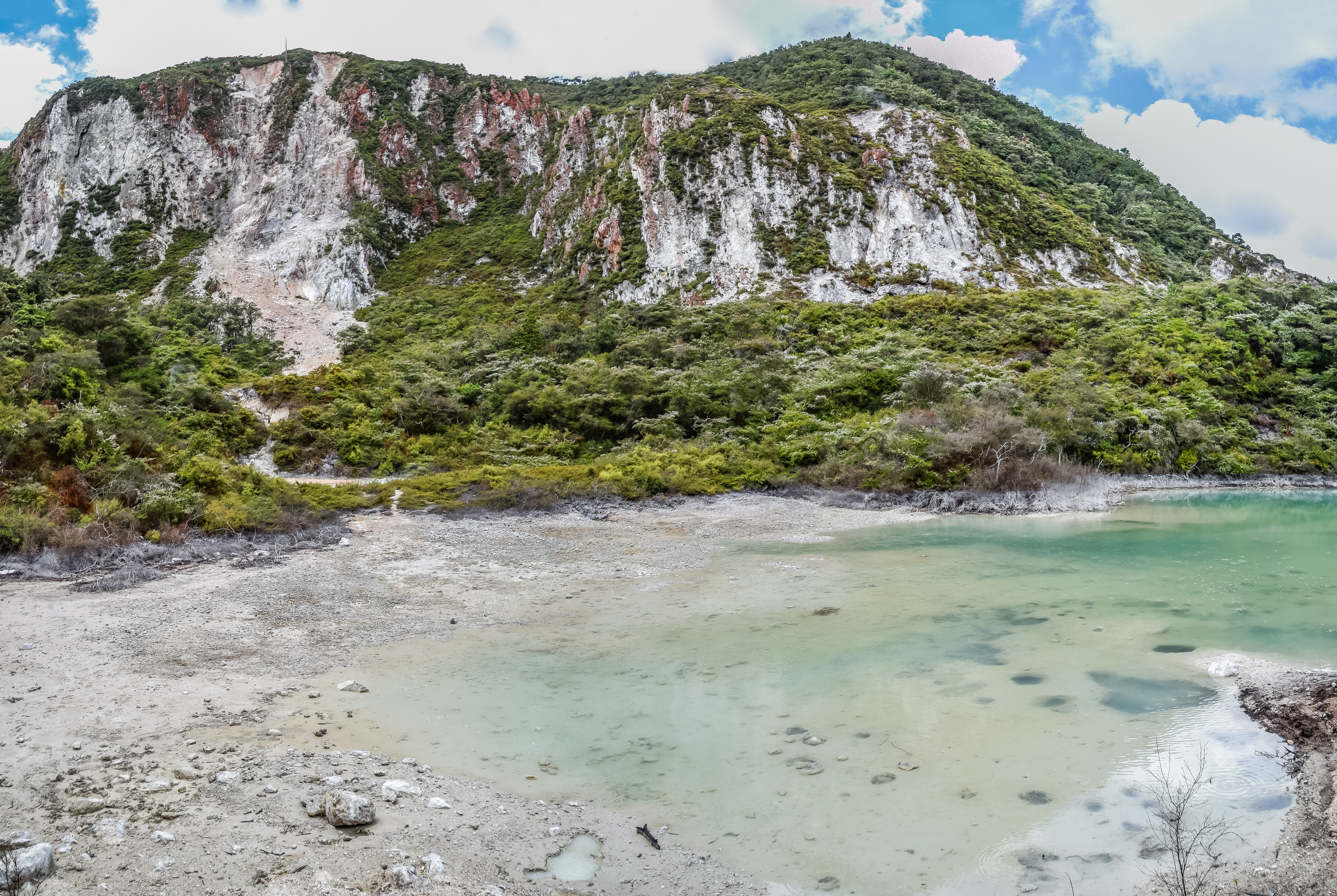

Highest point
- Elevation: 743 m (2,438 ft)
- Coordinates: 38°19′10″S 176°23′19″E

Geography
- Location within North Island
- Location: Waikato, New Zealand

Geology
- Mountain type: Stratovolcano
- Last eruption: Hydrothermal about 1315 CE, as dacite about 180,000 years ago

Climbing
- Easiest route: Mt Kakaramea (Rainbow Mountain) Summit Track
- Access: State Highway 5

Maunga Kākaramea (also known officially as Rainbow Mountain) is a 743 metres (2,438 ft) high dacite volcano located between Rotorua and Taupō in the North Island Volcanic Plateau of New Zealand. It has multiple steaming features and a picturesque crater lake reached by a short walk from the nearest road and has a nearby geothermal area.

== Geography ==
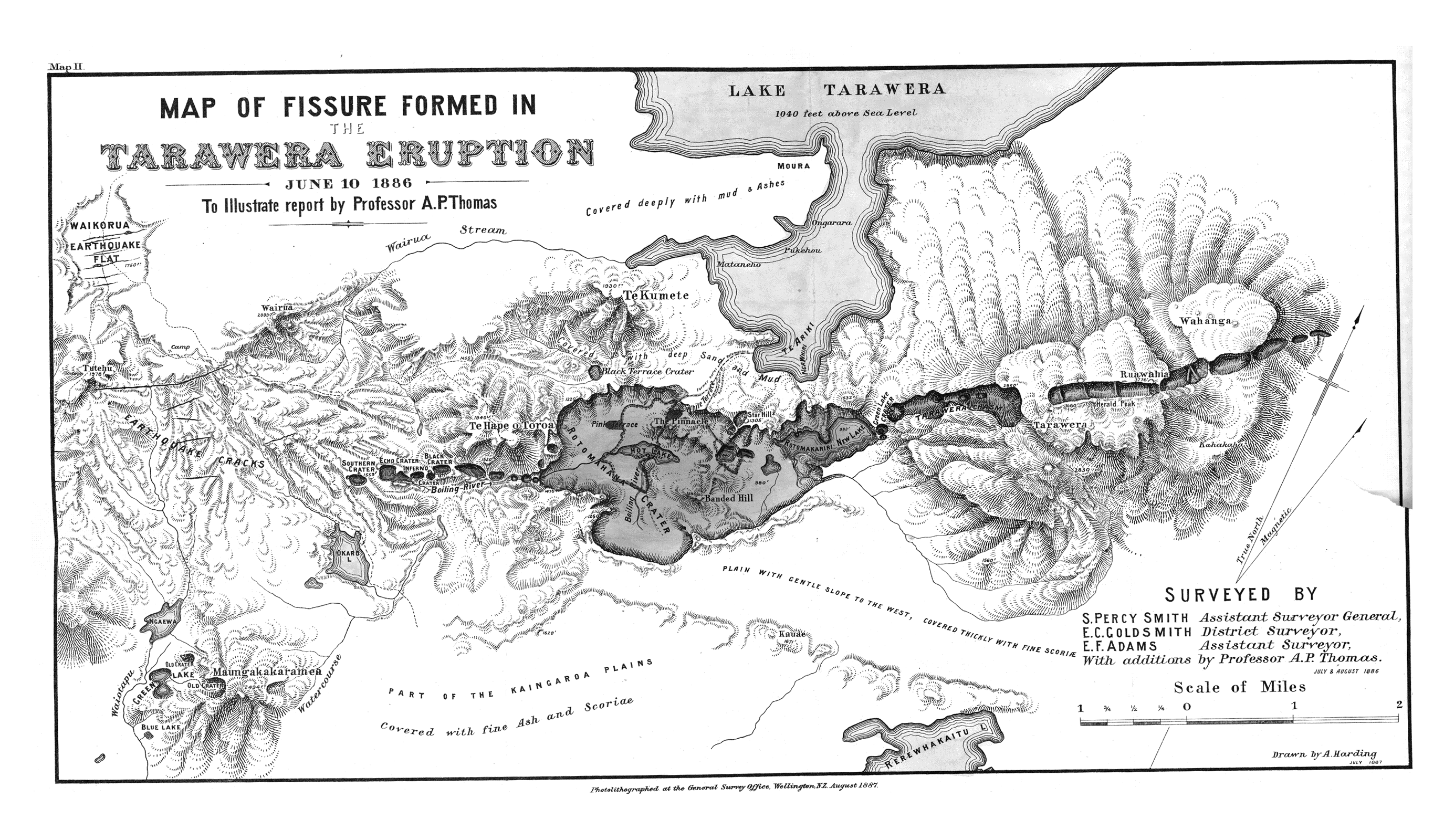
Maunga Kākaramea as first mapped in 1887/88 after the 1886 eruption of Mount Tarawera.

Maunga Kākaramea (meaning mountain of coloured earth, sometimes called Maungakakaramea and also known in colloquial English as Mount Kakaramea - but do not confuse with Kakaramea another mountain) is located at the western borders of the Okataina Volcanic Centre. To the north west is the still active Waimangu Volcanic Rift Valley and closer to the south west the Maungakaramea hot springs. To the west across the Hakereteke stream (European settlement name Kerosene Creek) valley is the slightly higher peak of Maungaongaonga at 825 metres (2,707 ft).

=== Geology ===
Map of surface volcanics centred on Maunga Kākaramea ( Rainbow mountain ) with its predominant dacite coloured purple. The dacite to the west is Maungaongaonga. Legend: Key for the volcanics that are shown with panning is: basalt (shades of brown/orange); monogenetic basalts; undifferentiated basalts of the Tangihua Complex in Northland Allochthon; arc basalts; arc ring basalts; dacite; andesite (shades of red); basaltic andesite; rhyolite (ignimbrite is lighter shades of violet); plutonic; White shading is selected caldera features.; Clicking on the rectangle icon enables full window and mouse-over with volcano name/wikilink and ages before present.

Much of the ground has been altered by steam action, which is most marked on the southern slopes of the mountain, extending almost to the summit. The steam has created fumarole clays of decomposed rhyolite. The six craters on the mountain are likely of hydrothermal origin. There have been quite large hydrothermal eruptions from areas of the mountain and nearby. This erupted material overlie the 232 CE Hatepe eruption pumice resulting in estimated eruption ages of about 1300 CE. Sulphur deposits and natural petroleum seeps occur in the area. The bare northern slopes are adjacent to the Ngapouri-Rotomahana Fault which is a splay of the Paeroa Fault at the eastern margin of the Taupō Rift of the Taupō Volcanic Zone. These slope's steam activity was much more marked following the last Tarawera eruption than at present. The hot water spring activity is all to the south of the fault line. Accordingly, just to the north we have an area that is displacing at a rate of 7.2 ± 0.4 mm/yr explaining the areas complex geology.

=== Tourism ===
Its emerald coloured crater lake is a short but steep walk for the fit from a car park off State Highway 5 and contrasts with ochre coloured cliffs. The flora is somewhat stunted both because of the continued geothermal activity but also as it is a regrowth area affected by the 1886 eruption of Mount Tarawera.

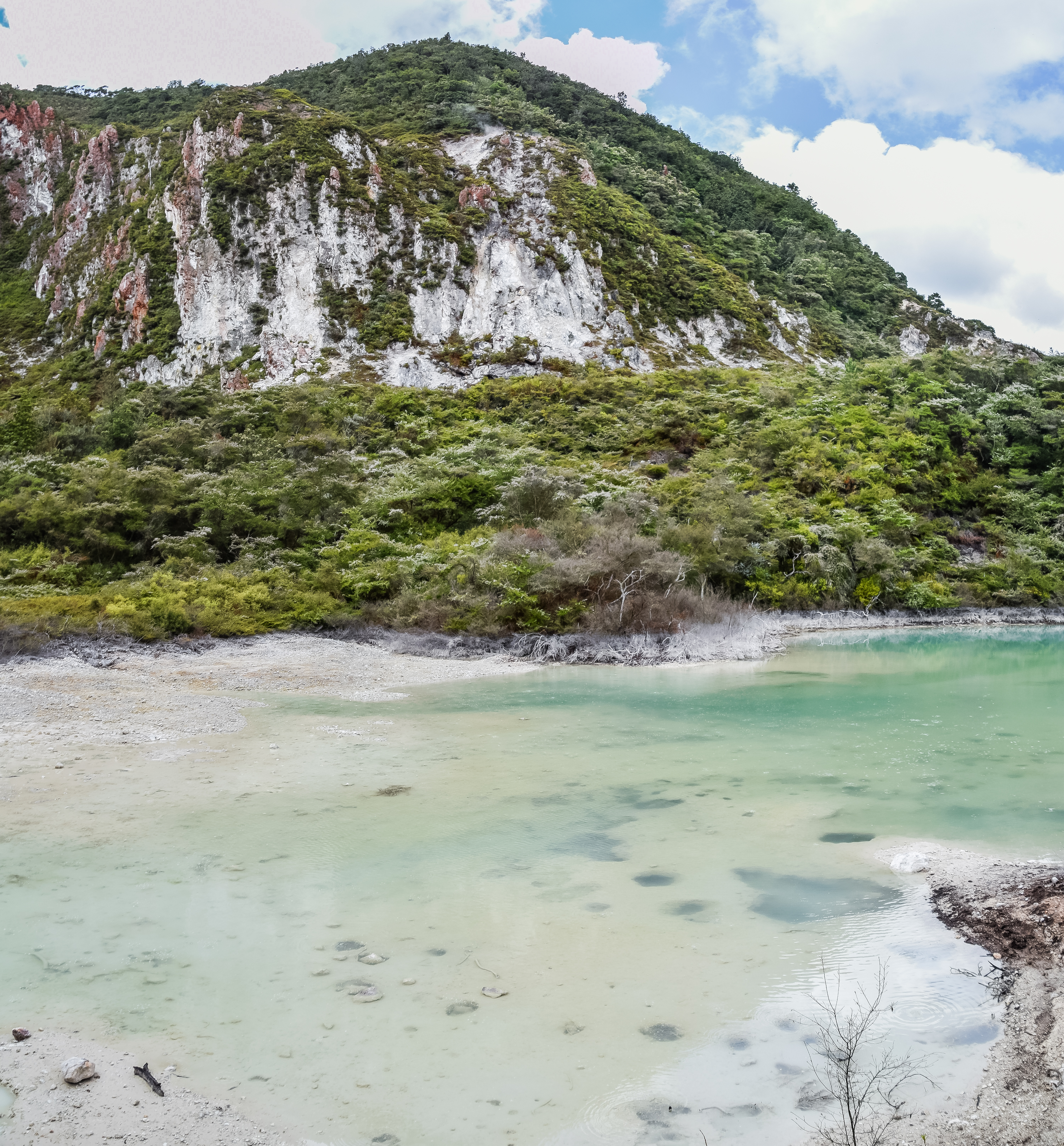
View of Maunga Kākaramea from Rainbow Mountain Scenic Reserve

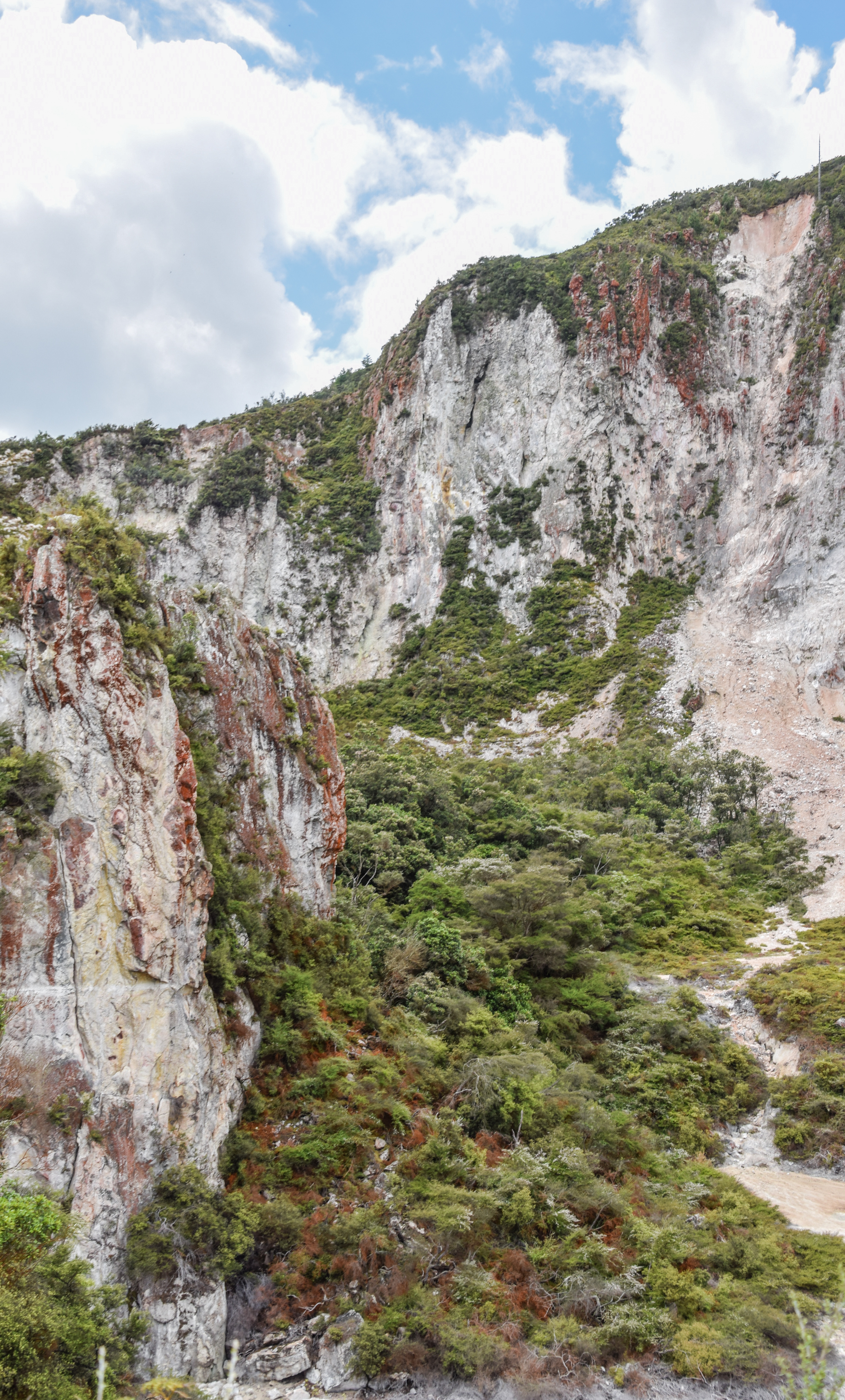
Coloured cliffs of Maunga Kākaramea

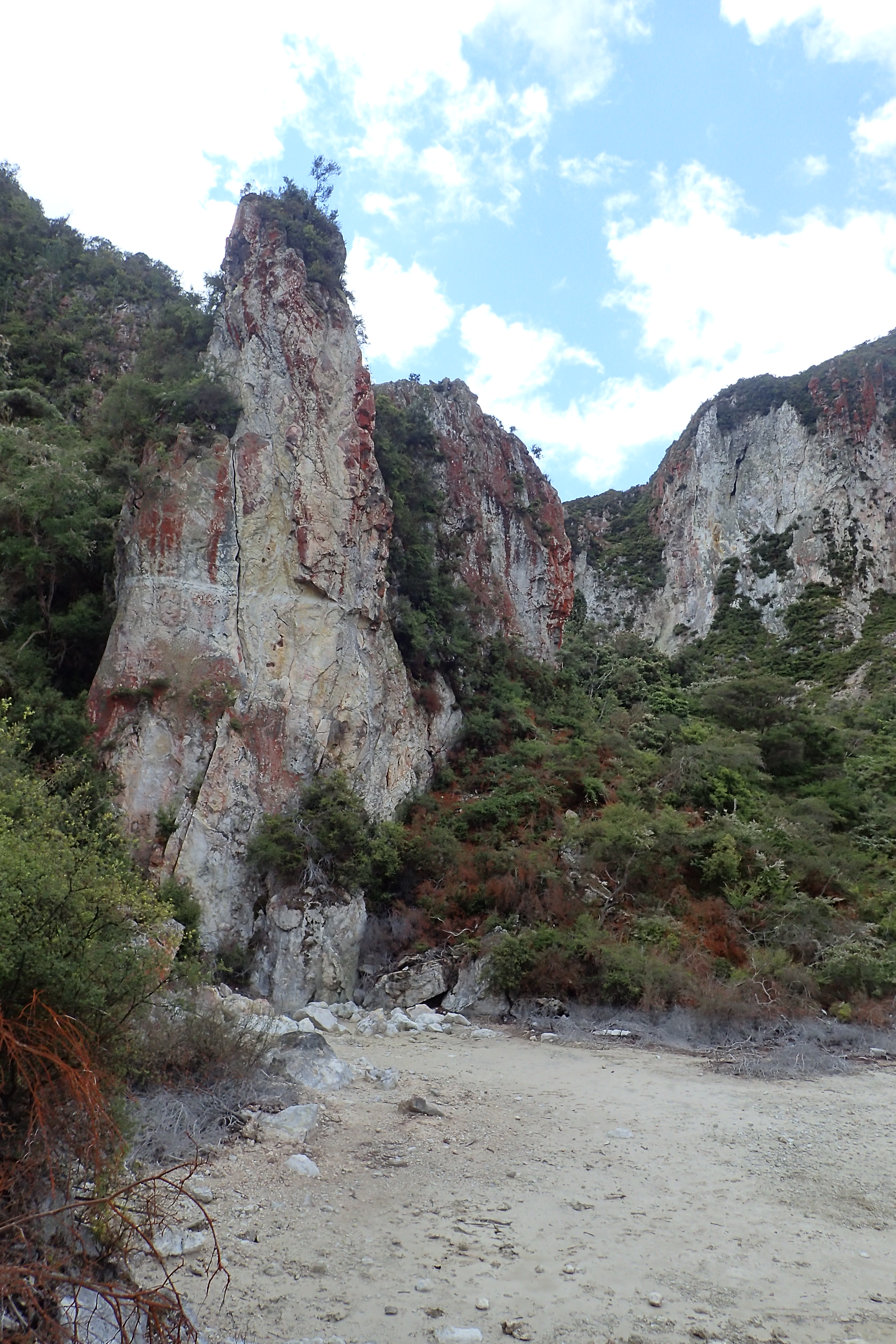
Close up of coloured cliffs of Maunga Kākaramea

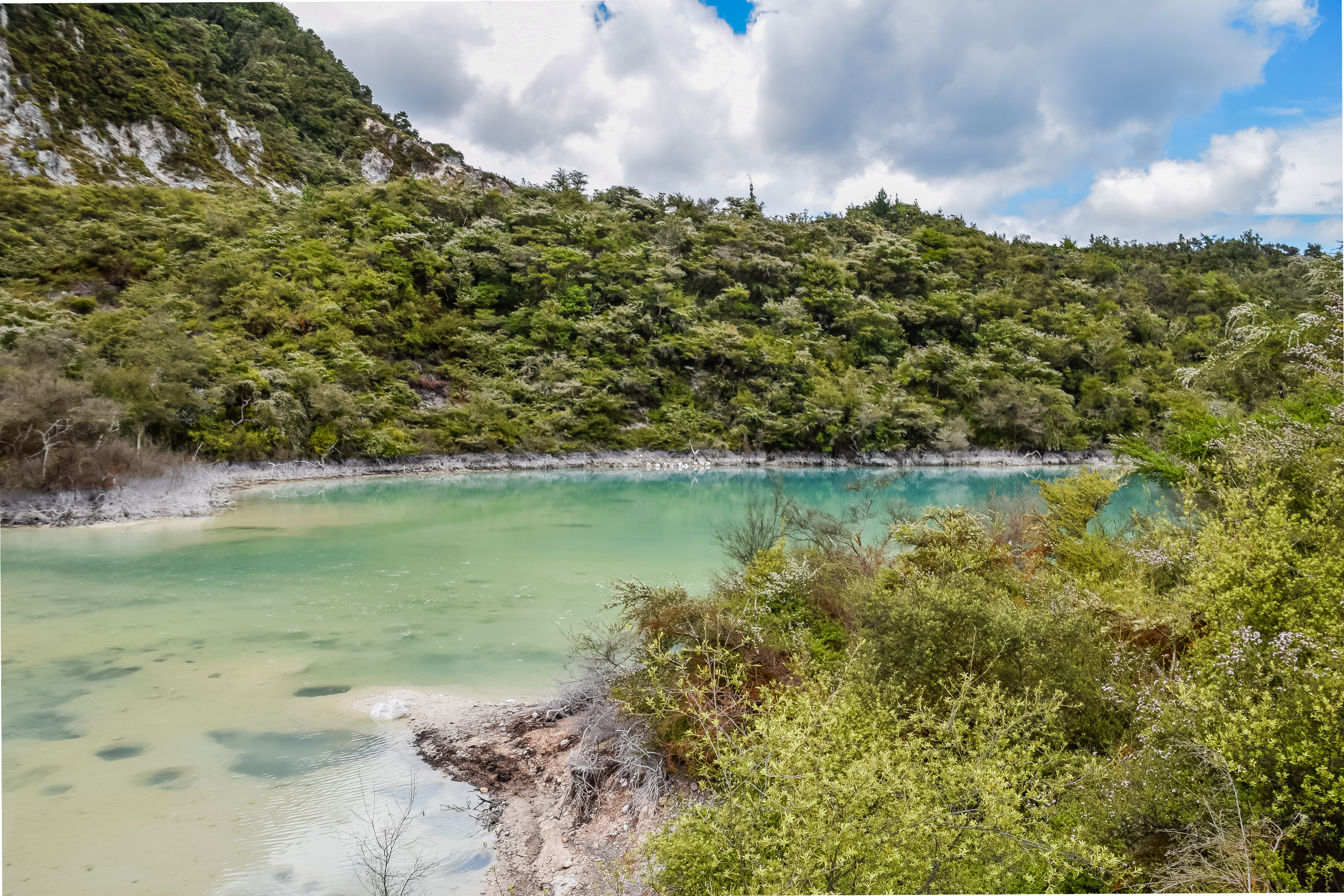
View of lake in Rainbow Mountain Scenic Reserve

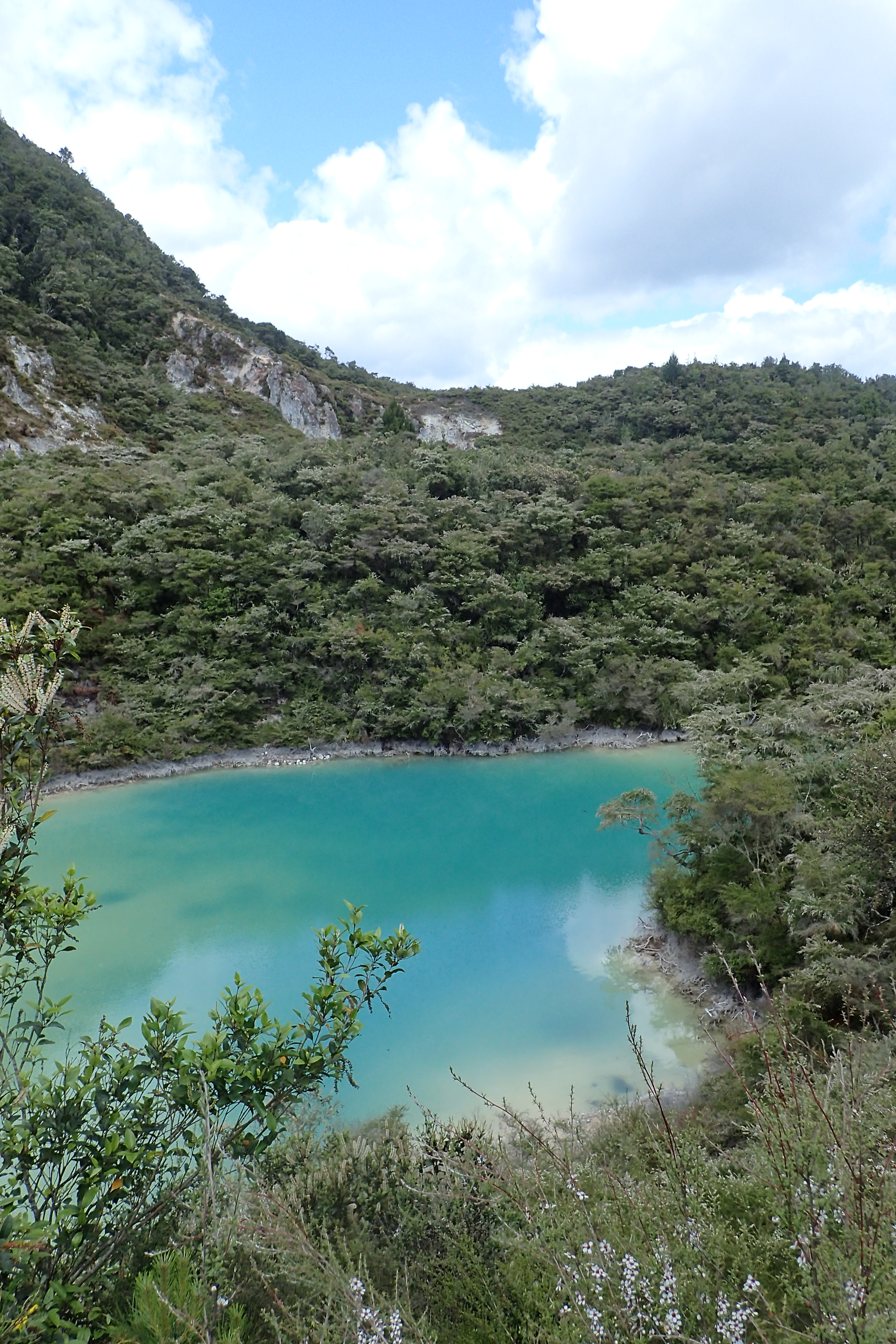
Crater lake Maunga Kākaramea

== See also ==
- List of volcanoes in New Zealand
