= Chuck Missler =

American businessman and minister (1934–2018)

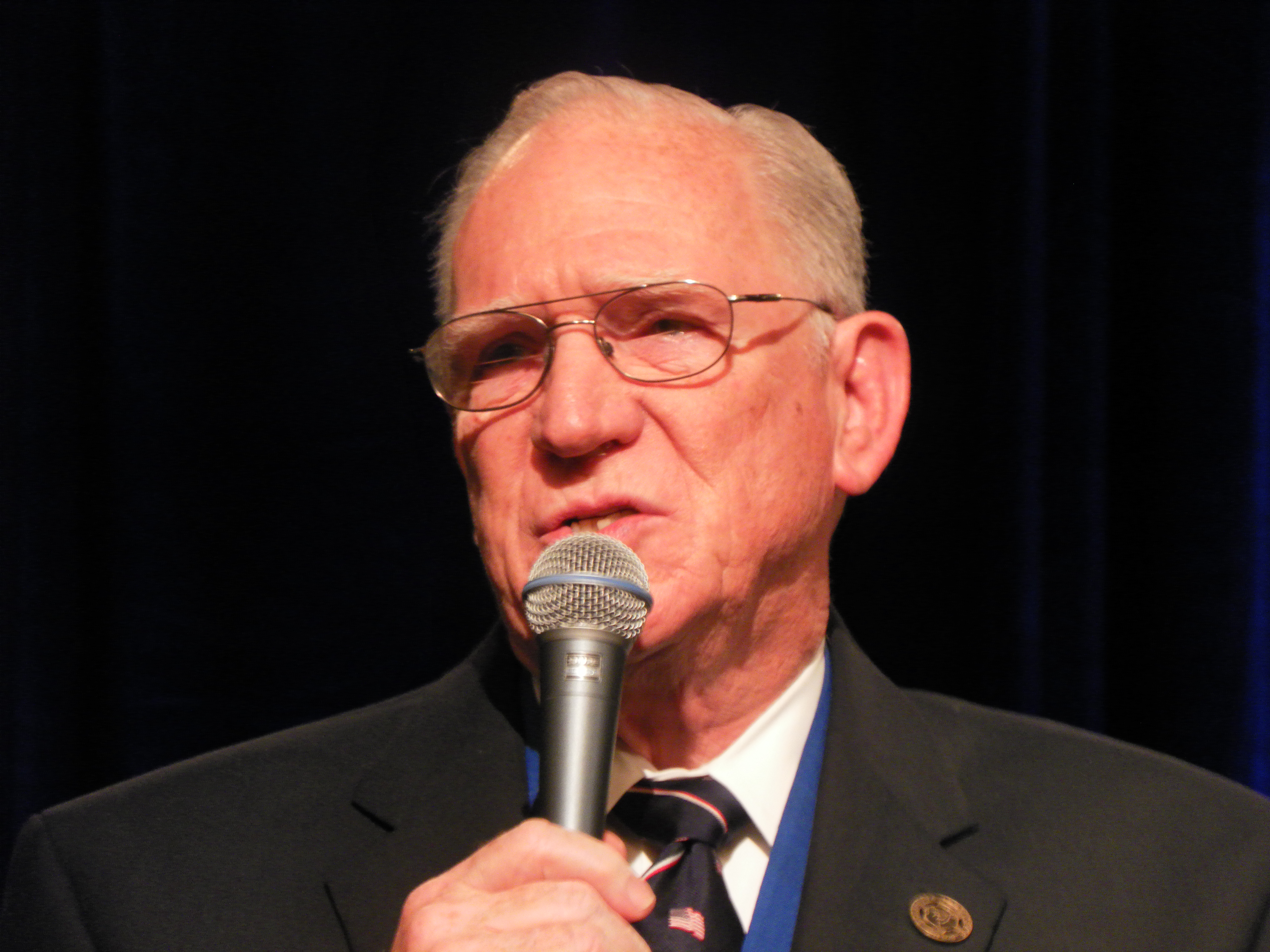
- Missler in 2010
- Born: May 28, 1934; Illinois, United States
- Died: May 1, 2018 (aged 83); Reporoa, New Zealand
- Occupations: Engineer; businessman; Bible teacher
- Years active: 1970s-2018
- Spouse: Nancy Missler (m. 1957; died 2015)
- Children: 4
- Website: chuckmissler.com

Charles W. Missler (May 28, 1934 – May 1, 2018) was an American author, evangelical Christian, Bible teacher, engineer, and businessman.

== Business career ==
Missler graduated from the U.S. Naval Academy in 1956 and received a Master's degree in Engineering from UCLA. He worked for several years in the aerospace and computer industries. He joined the Ford Motor Company in 1963. Missler joined Western Digital as chairman and chief executive in June 1977 and became the largest shareholder of Western Digital.

In 1983, Missler became the chairman and chief executive of Helionetics, Inc., another technology company. He left Helionetics in 1984 "to pursue other opportunities in the high-technology field." In August 1985, Helionetics sued Missler, alleging a conflict of interest, claiming that after Missler and other Helionetics executives had decided not to purchase a small defense electronics maker, that same company was purchased by an investment corporation in which Missler held a controlling interest. The suit was settled when Missler's firm agreed to pay Helionetics $1.6 million.

In 1989, he headed the Phoenix Group International, a former Colorado real estate company that entered the high-tech industry to sell personal computers to Russian schools. Phoenix filed for bankruptcy protection in 1990 when the deal did not develop as anticipated, due to a subsidiary being found to have no experience with computers.

== Ministry ==
After the Phoenix deal collapsed, Missler started an online ministry, Koinonia House, and became known as a prominent speaker on the subject of Bible prophecy.

A Los Angeles Times article reported that Missler and co-author Hal Lindsey had plagiarized a portion of Miami University Professor Edwin Yamauchi's 1982 book Foes from the Northern Frontier in their own 1992 book The Magog Factor. Hal Lindsey's manager Paul Krikac said Missler had written the passages in question, but conceded that Lindsey is responsible for the overall manuscript: "His (Lindsey's) butt is on the line." After the missed attribution was acknowledged by Missler, book shipments to bookstores were discontinued and all of the authors' proceeds donated to a ministry. Missler was later accused of plagiarism of New Age writer Michael Talbot's 1992 book The Holographic Universe in his 1999 book Cosmic Codes: Messages from the Edge of Eternity. Missler also acknowledged this as missed attribution and apologized publicly. He said a correction would be inserted in all unsold copies and the book itself updated in subsequent printings. Missler donated all of the author's proceeds from the book to a ministry.

Due to his experience with technology, Missler was a figurehead in bringing the "Year Two Thousand Bug" (a.k.a. "Y2K bug") to the attention of the Christian community. In 1998, he coauthored a book with John Ankerberg investigating whether America would survive the crises to be caused, he claimed, by embedded computer chips that would malfunction on what they would calculate as year zero.

== Personal life and death ==
Missler was married to Nancy Missler. They had two sons and two daughters. Nancy died of cancer on November 11, 2015.

Missler died at his home in Reporoa, New Zealand, in 2018.

== Books ==
- The Magog Invasion. Western Front Ltd. 1996. ISBN 0-9641-0586-1.
- Learn the Bible in 24 Hours. Koinonia House. 2002. ISBN 1-57821-630-3.
- Prophecy 20/20: Profiling the Future Through the Lens of Scripture. Thomas Nelson. 2006. ISBN 0-7852-1889-0.
- Alien Encounters: The Secret Behind the UFO Phenomenon. Koinonia House. 2003. ISBN 1-57821-205-7.
- Eastman, Mark & Missler, Chuck (1995). The Creator: Beyond Time & Space. Word For Today. ISBN 0-936728-61-2.
- Cosmic Codes: Hidden Messages From the Edge of Eternity. Koinonia House. 2004. ISBN 1-57821-255-3.
- Hidden Treasures in the Biblical Text. Koinonia House. 2000. ISBN 1-57821-127-1.
- Missler, Chuck & Missler, Nancy (2004). Why Should I Be the First to Change?: The Key to a Loving Marriage. Koinonia House. ISBN 978-0975359310.
- Missler, Chuck & Missler, Nancy (2012). The Kingdom, Power, & Glory: The Overcomer's Handbook. The King's High Way Ministries. ISBN 978-0979513640.
