= Maungaongaonga =

Volcano in New Zealand

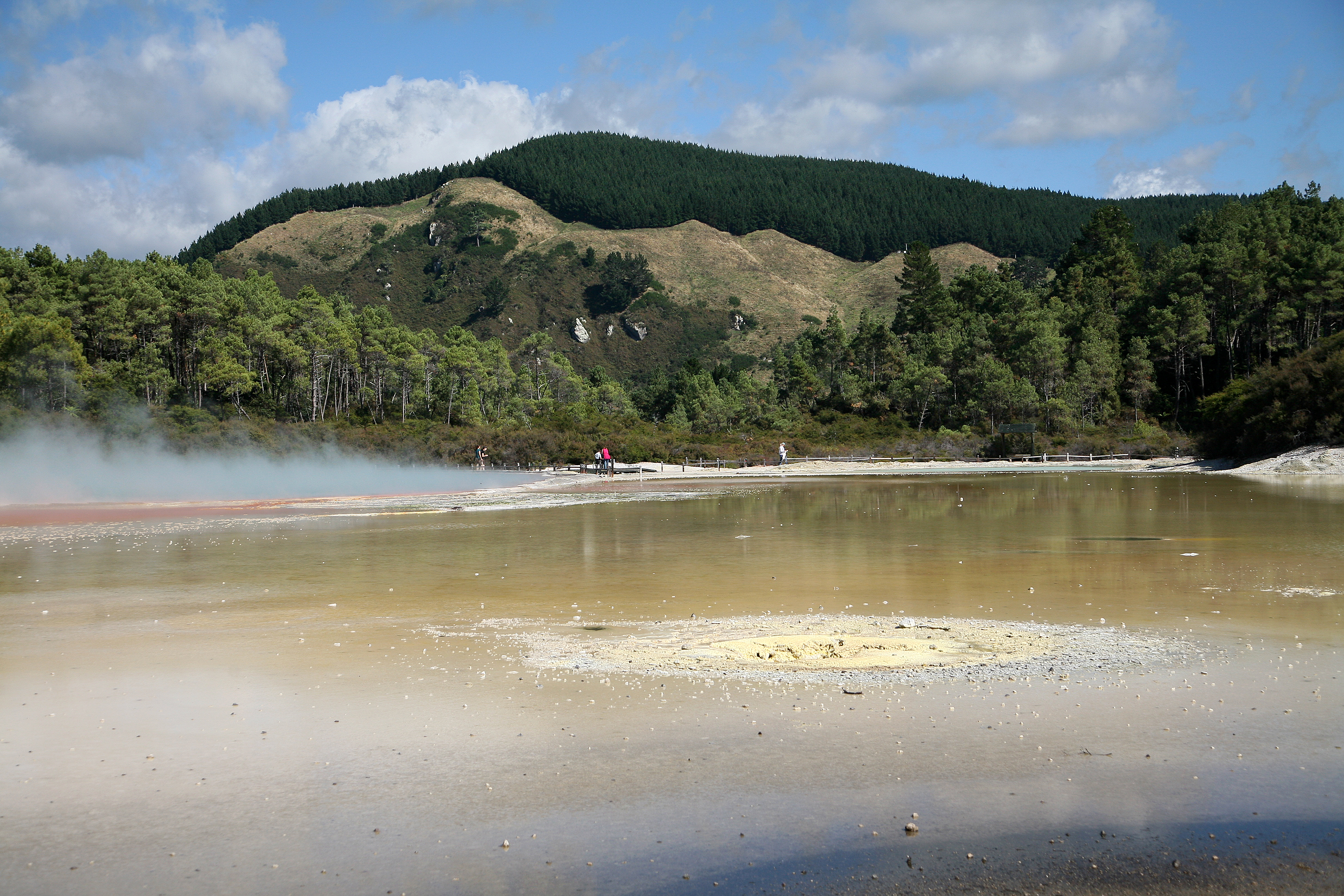
- View of Maungaongaonga towards north west from Waiotapu

Highest point
- Elevation: 825 m (2,707 ft)
- Coordinates: 38°19′34″S 176°20′42″E

Geography
- Location within North Island
- Location: Waikato, New Zealand

Geology
- Mountain type: Stratovolcano
- Last eruption: As dacite about 180,000 years ago

Climbing
- Access: State Highway 5

Maungaongaonga is an 825 metres (2,707 ft) high dacite volcano located between Rotorua and Taupō in the North Island Volcanic Plateau. The area of the mountain is a scenic reserve and some of its southern slopes are highly geothermally active.

== Geography ==
Maungaongaonga is located at the far western border of the Okataina Volcanic Centre. To the east across the Hakereteke stream valley (historically called Kerosene creek) is the slightly lower but more striking Maunga Kākaramea or Rainbow mountain which is often steaming from its geothermal field. To the North west is the still active Waimangu Volcanic Rift Valley. The main peak of the volcano has at about 1.6 kilometres (1 mile) to its south a large extrusion dome (trig B27G) that is 592 metres (1,942 ft) high. Also to the south, about the 330 metres (1,080 ft) level, are pumice raft blocks on the valley margins, as for a period following the Taupō eruption of 232 CE the whole area of lowland extending towards Taupō and the present Waikato River was a lake.

=== Geology ===
Map of surface volcanics centred on Maungaongaonga with its predominant dacite coloured purple. The dacite to the east is Maunga Kākaramea or Rainbow mountain. Legend: Key for the volcanics that are shown with panning is: basalt (shades of brown/orange); monogenetic basalts; undifferentiated basalts of the Tangihua Complex in Northland Allochthon; arc basalts; arc ring basalts; dacite; andesite (shades of red); basaltic andesite; rhyolite (ignimbrite is lighter shades of violet); plutonic; White shading is selected caldera features.; Clicking on the rectangle icon enables full window and mouse-over with volcano name/wikilink and ages before present.

There have been quite large hydrothermal eruptions from areas adjacent to the base of the mountain and whose erupted material overlay the Hatepe eruption pumice resulting in estimated eruption ages of about 1300 CE. Warm ground extends up to some of the southern ridges of the volcano. The hot water spring geothermal activity is confined to the downthrown side of the Ngapouri-Rotomahana Fault but steam geothermal activity is on both sides of the fault reflecting the highest heat output for the Waiotapu geothermal area. This fault is a splay of the Paeroa Fault at the eastern margin of the Taupō Rift of the Taupō Volcanic Zone and indeed the Paeroa range extends south-south-west of Maungaongaonga along this fault line that is displacing at a rate of 7.2 ± 0.4 mm/yr.

== Biology ==
The lower part of the Maungaongaonga Scenic Reserve along the Waikite valley is dangerous to access due to its geothermal features. However the difficulty in access means it is classified as high quality geothermal habitat with four at risk species being geothermal kānuka (Kunzea ericoides), the ferns Dicranopteris linearis and Nephrolepis flexuosa, and Korthalsella salicornioides.

== See also ==
- List of volcanoes in New Zealand
