= Prospect Dam (Arizona) =

Former lava dam in the Grand Canyon of Arizona

Coordinates: 36.1914°N 113.0472°W

Prospect Dam is a former lava dam in the Grand Canyon of Arizona, United States. It was the oldest and tallest of several former lava dams in the Grand Canyon. It was formed about 1.2 million years ago as lava flowed down the walls of the Grand Canyon, and temporarily stopped the flow of the Colorado River.
