= Hakereteke Stream =

Waterfall near Waiotapu, Waikato, New Zealand

Coordinates: 38.335467°S 176.386283°E

Hakereteke Stream Kerosene Creek
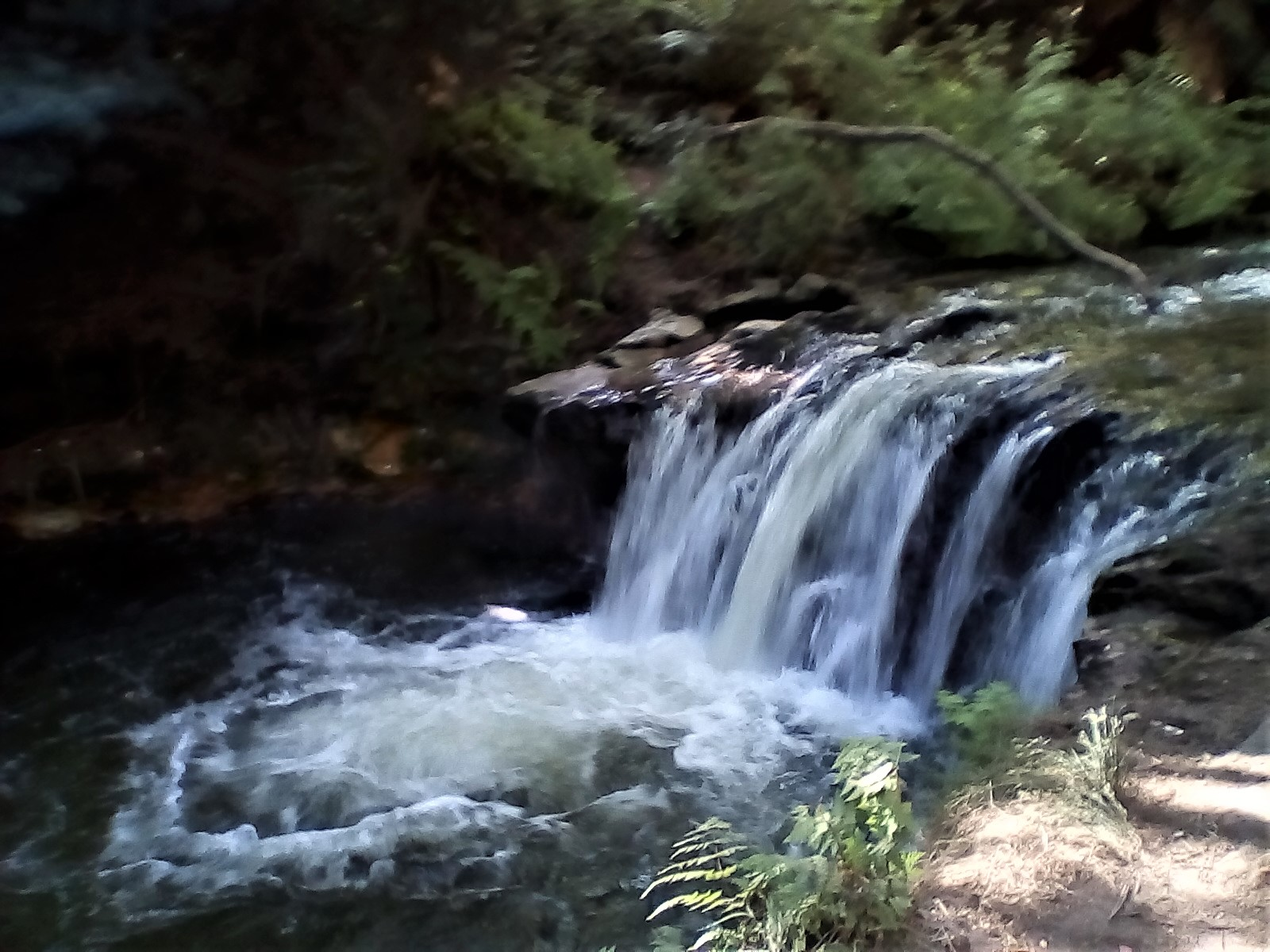
- Kerosene Creek waterfall
- Hakereteke Stream with Kerosene Creek waterfall marked
- Native name: Te Ranga (Māori)

Hakereteke Stream (also known as Kerosene Creek) is a hot spring stream near Rotorua, New Zealand. It is near the geothermal area of Waiotapu, running between the peaks to its west of Maungaongaonga and to north east of Maunga Kākaramea. The stream rises on the slopes of Tutehu, passes through a swamp adjacent to Rotowhera (Green Lake) at the foot of Maunga Kākaramea, runs aside the Kerosene Creek trail for a short portion and joins the Waikokomuka stream to form the Waiotapu stream. It is a tourist attraction and part has been used as a swimming hole, with this portion also known as Te Ranga. (Note: Te Ranga is a very common geographical name in New Zealand and this name for this portion of the Hakereteke stream could cause confusion as the tourist attraction portions of the stream are more commonly referred to as features of Kerosene Creek.) In 2015 AA Directions ranked it as one of the top 10 swimming holes in New Zealand. The creek has not been commercialised. The creek has a waterfall with a height of about 2 m (6 ft 7 in).

== Geology ==
The upper stream is fed by standard drainage, but from the slopes of Maunga Kākaramea onwards many hot springs also contribute to the stream. Some have petroleum seeps (hence name Kerosene Creek), and many are acid and gas producing, for example of hydrogen sulfide.

== Culture ==
The area is significant to the local iwi Ngāti Tūhourangi and Ngāti Tahu – Ngāti Whaoa. Kerosene Creek is a 2005 short film about a tragedy affecting a group of partying teenagers at the waterhole.
