= Horomatangi Reef =

Volcanic feature in New Zealand's North Island Lake Taupo

Horomatangi Reef eruptions
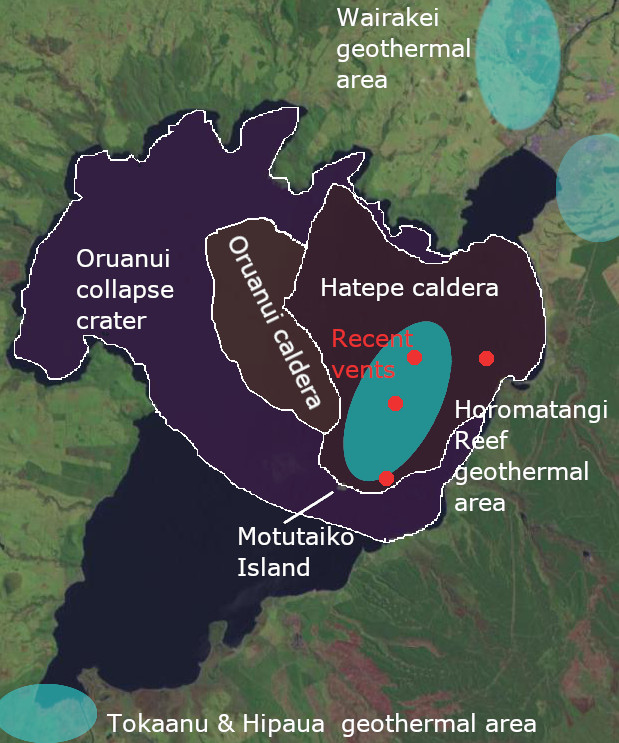
- Volcanic features of Lake Taupō. Red are active vents in last 2500 odd years. Blue are current active geothermal systems.
- Volcano: Lake Taupō
- Date: Most recently about 260 AD, but most significant 232 AD Unit Y (Hatepe eruption) and 1460 BCE Unit S
- Start date: 1460 BCE Unit S
- End date: 260 AD
- Type: Phreatomagmatic, Ultra-Plinian
- Location: Lake Taupō, North Island, New Zealand; 38.8°S 176.00°E
- VEI: 6 (Unit S), 7 (Unit Y)

Maps
- Horomatangi Reef (New Zealand) Horomatangi Reef (North Island) {{{map-caption}}}

The Horomatangi Reef or reefs is a feature of Lake Taupō, in the central North Island of New Zealand.

The reef is named after Horomātangi (Horo-matangi), the tāniwha or water monster of the lake, who is said to reside in a cave adjacent to the nearby Motutaiko Island to the south. The name Horomatangi Reefs perhaps better reflects its complex inner and outer structure with the shallow reefs separated by very deep areas, so tends to be used in the geological literature, while the term reef tends to be used geographically.

== Geology ==
The reefs are at a high heat-output geothermal hot spot area within the Taupō Volcano. This is related to rhyolitic lava domes extruded after explosive volcanism. The explosive eruptions include the VEI 7 Hatepe eruption of 232 ± 10 CE that ejected over 120 km^{3} (29 cu mi) of material (also known as Horomatangi Reef Unit Y eruption) and its linear line of eruption centres, as well as its own namesake Horomatangi, Unit S VEI 6 eruption of about 1460 BCE. Accordingly the reef is perhaps best regarded as a complex volcano within the caldera of another complex volcano. There is one area of 500 m (1,600 ft) diameter dropping to a depth of over 164 m (538 ft) below mean lake level.

== Contemporary volcanic activity ==
Recent periods of volcanic unrest of the Taupō Volcano have been associated with earthquake swarms centred in the area of the Horomatangi Reef. From February to October 2022 during a period of volcanic unrest the reef had inflated upwards by a mean of 24 mm (0.94 in) relative to other reference points around Lake Taupō. A shallow magnitude 5.7 earthquake occurred on 30 November 2022 causing a further sudden upwards inflation of 180 mm (7.1 in), being the largest amount of uplift ever recorded to date for the reef.
