= Taupō Volcano =

Supervolcano in New Zealand

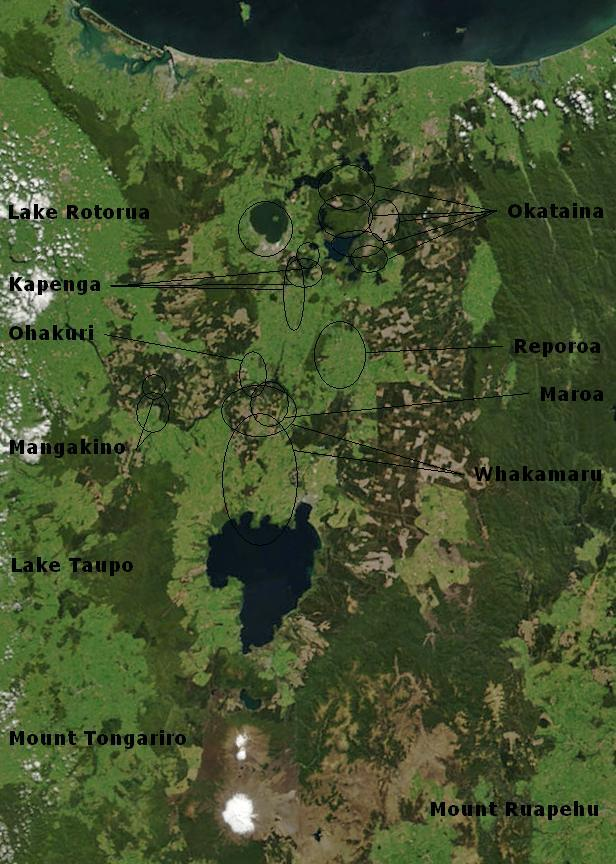
- Volcano, lake, and caldera locations in the Taupō Volcanic Zone

Highest point
- Elevation: 452 m (1,483 ft)
- Prominence: Motutaiko Island
- Coordinates: 38°48′20″S 175°54′03″E

Dimensions
- Width: 33 km (21 mi)

Geography
- Location within New Zealand Location within North Island
- Location: North Island
- Country: New Zealand
- Region: Waikato

Geology
- Rock age: Pleistocene - Meghalayan (0.3–0.0018 Ma )
- Mountain type: Caldera
- Volcanic zone: Taupō Volcanic Zone
- Last eruption: About 250 CE

Climbing
- Access: State Highway 1

Lake Taupō, in the centre of New Zealand's North Island, fills the caldera of the Taupō Volcano, a large rhyolitic supervolcano. This huge volcano has produced two of the world's most powerful eruptions in geologically recent times.

The volcano is in the Taupō Volcanic Zone within the Taupō Rift, a region of rift volcanic activity that extends from Ruapehu in the south, through the Taupō and Rotorua districts, to Whakaari / White Island, in the Bay of Plenty.

== History ==
Taupō began erupting about 300,000 years ago. The main eruptions that still affect the surrounding landscape are the dacitic Mount Tauhara eruption 65,000 years ago, the Oruanui eruption about 25,500 years ago, (Note: The age of the Oruanui eruption has been determined by several independent methods and may be subject to further correction. A previous age of 26.5 ka, has since been updated to IntCal20 correction to 25.675 ± 0.09 ka cal BP. In 2022 the ice core date of 25.318 ± .25 ka BP using the WD2014 timescale was corrected to 25.718 ka. The review article used here as source says around 25,500 years ago which is not a precise statement like the later 2022 corrections.) which is responsible for the shape of the modern caldera, and the Hatepe eruption, dated 232 ± 10 CE. There have been many more eruptions, with major ones every thousand years or so (see timeline of last 10,000 years of eruptions). The Oruanui eruption in particular destroyed or obscured much evidence of previous eruptive activity.

Taupō Volcano has not erupted for approximately 1,800 years; however, with research beginning in 1979 and published in 2022, the data collated over the 42-year period shows that Taupō Volcano is active with periods of volcanic unrest and has been for some time. Some volcanoes within the Taupō Volcanic Zone have erupted more recently. Mount Tarawera had a moderately violent VEI-5 eruption in 1886, and Whakaari/White Island is frequently active, erupting most recently in December 2019. Geologic studies published in 1888 following the eruption of Mount Tarawera first raised the possibility that there was a volcano under Lake Taupō, rather than the more obvious volcanoes near Mount Tongariro, to explain the likely source of the extensive surface pumice deposits of the central North Island.

== Geology ==
The Taupō Volcano erupts rhyolite, a viscous magma, with a high silica content, a feature associated with the middle portion of the Taupō Volcanic Zone within the Taupō Rift. This is an intra-arc rift in the eastern part of the continental Australian Plate, resulting from an oblique convergence with the Pacific Plate in the Hikurangi subduction zone. In this region the Moho discontinuity starts about 25–30 km (16–19 mi) beneath the surface beyond the modern Taupō Rift boundaries to the west and east, but the interpretation of changes in seismic velocity at shallower depth has led to disagreement. Intermediate velocities occur down to between 15–16 km (9.3–9.9 mi) and are believed to be due to mainly quartzo-feldspathic crust. Between 15 and 25 km more mafic rock compositions are indicated by the P-wave velocities. Studies show large areas of partial melt below 10 km (6.2 mi) with a brittle-ductile rock transition at approximately 6–8 km (3.7–5.0 mi) beneath the surface. For unknown as yet reasons, possibly associated with the present high rate of rift spreading and the recent subduction of the Hikurangi Plateau this area is very productive in its surface volcanism.

If the magma does not contain much gas, rhyolite tends to just form a lava dome, and such eruptions are more common. However, when mixed with gas or steam, rhyolitic eruptions can be extremely violent. The magma froths to form pumice and ash, which is thrown out with great force. Such eruptions tend to be earlier in any given eruption cycle.

If the volcano creates a stable plume, high in the atmosphere, the pumice and ash are blown sideways, and eventually fall to the ground, draping the landscape like snow.

If the material thrown out cools more rapidly and becomes denser than the air, it cannot rise as high, and suddenly collapses back to the ground, forming a pyroclastic flow, hitting the surface like water from a waterfall, and spreading sideways across the land at enormous speed. When the pumice and ash settle, they are sufficiently hot to stick together as a rock called ignimbrite. Pyroclastic flows can travel hundreds of kilometres an hour.

== Earlier eruptions ==
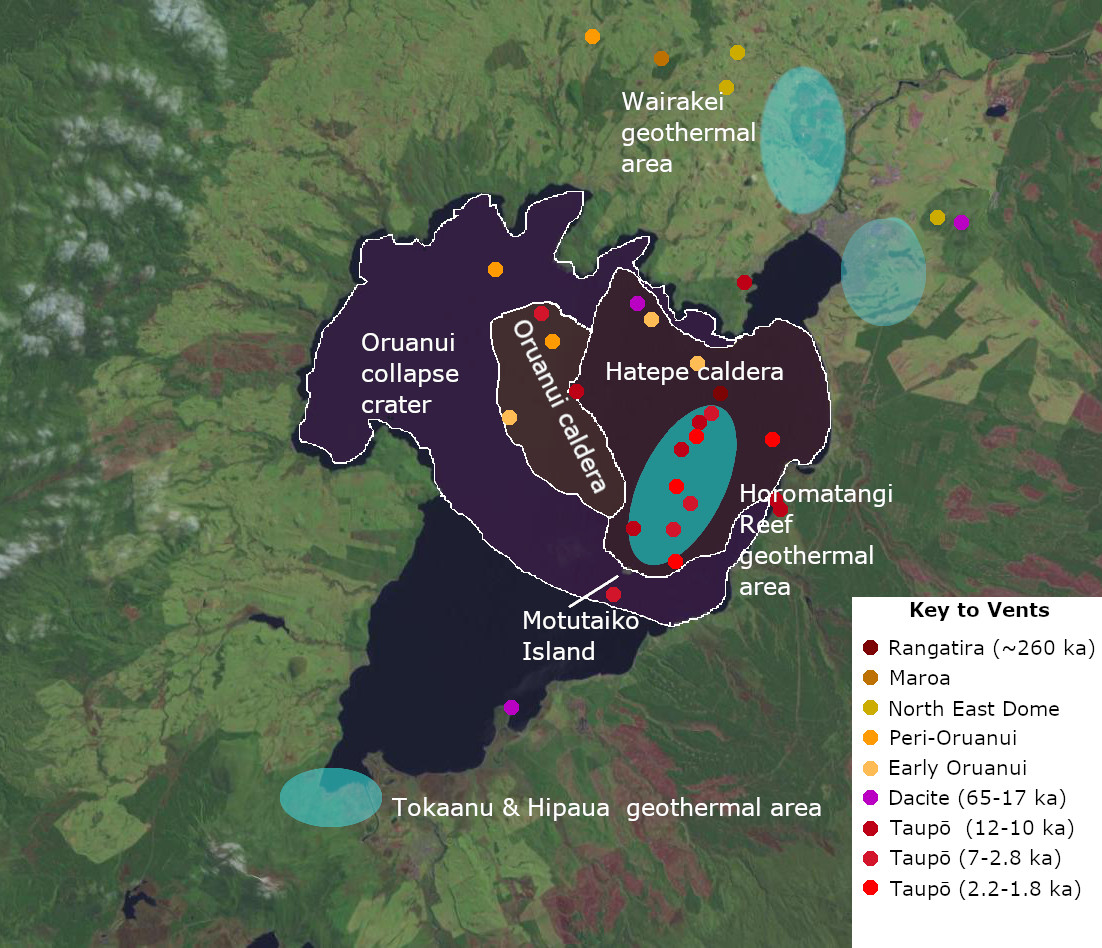
Recent vents and caldera structures Taupō Volcano. Present active geothermal systems are in light blue. A key to the vents is in the diagram

Earlier ignimbrite eruptions occurred further north than Taupō. Some of these were enormous, and two eruptions around 1.25 and 1.0 million years ago were big enough to generate an ignimbrite sheet that covered the North Island from Auckland to Napier.

While Taupō has been active for about 300,000 years, explosive eruptions have been more typical in the last 42,000 years.

== Oruanui eruption ==
Map so centred to show approximate selected surface volcanic deposits, including all the present surface Oruanui and Hatepe ignimbrites. Tephra from these eruptions was much more widespread. Legend: Key for the volcanics that are shown with panning is: basalt (shades of brown/orange); monogenetic basalts; undifferentiated basalts of the Tangihua Complex in Northland Allochthon; arc basalts; arc ring basalts; dacite; andesite (shades of red); basaltic andesite; rhyolite (ignimbrite is lighter shades of violet); plutonic; White shading is selected caldera features.; Clicking on the rectangle icon enables full window and mouse-over with volcano name/wikilink and ages before present.

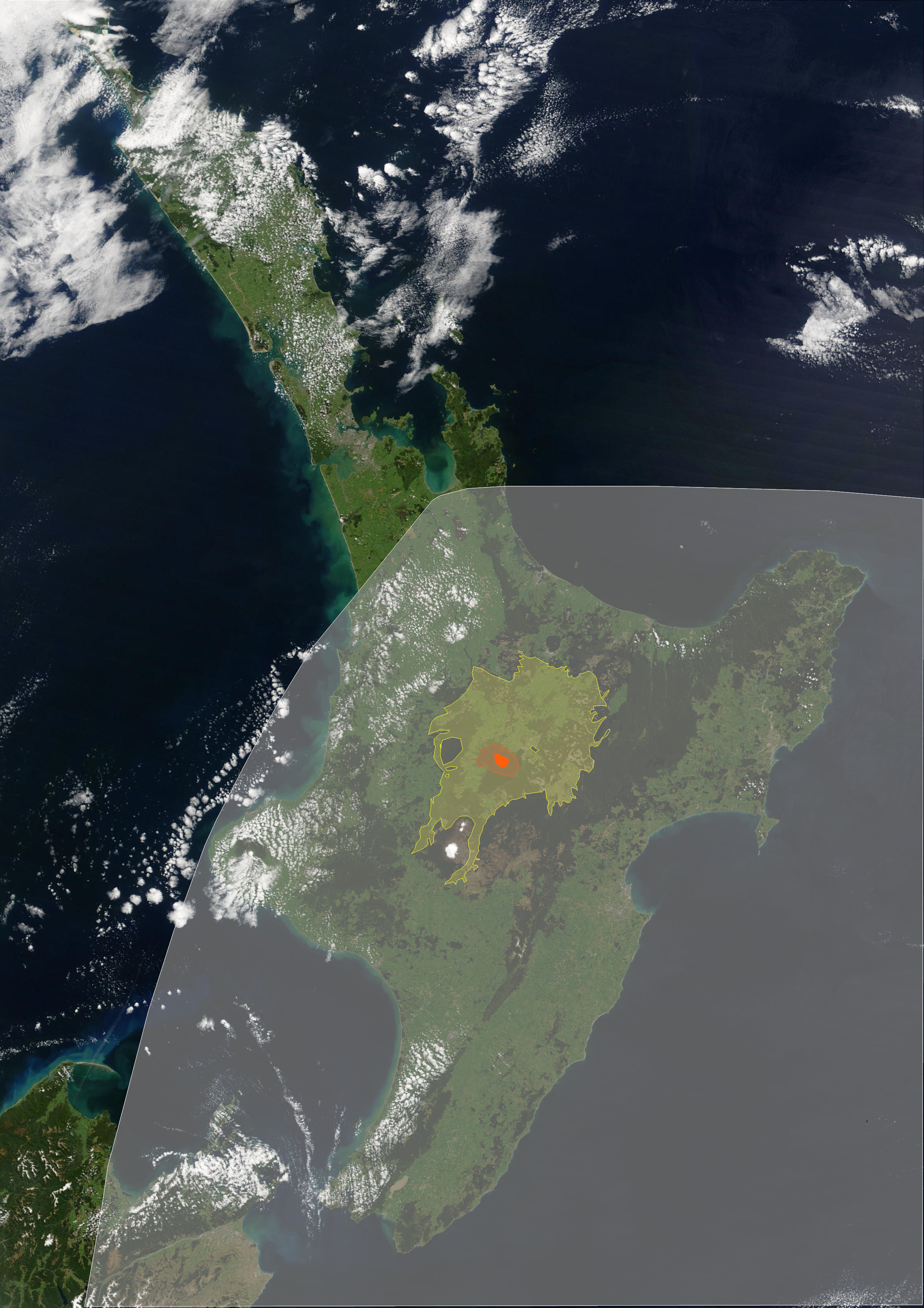
Oruanui eruption impact North Island in terms of approximate 10cm ash deposit (white shading) and approximate ignimbrite from pyroclastic flow (yellow shading). The central red area is the Oruanui caldera with surrounding collapse crater in lighter red. It is superimposed on present day New Zealand although at the time New Zealand land mass was larger, as sea level was much lower.

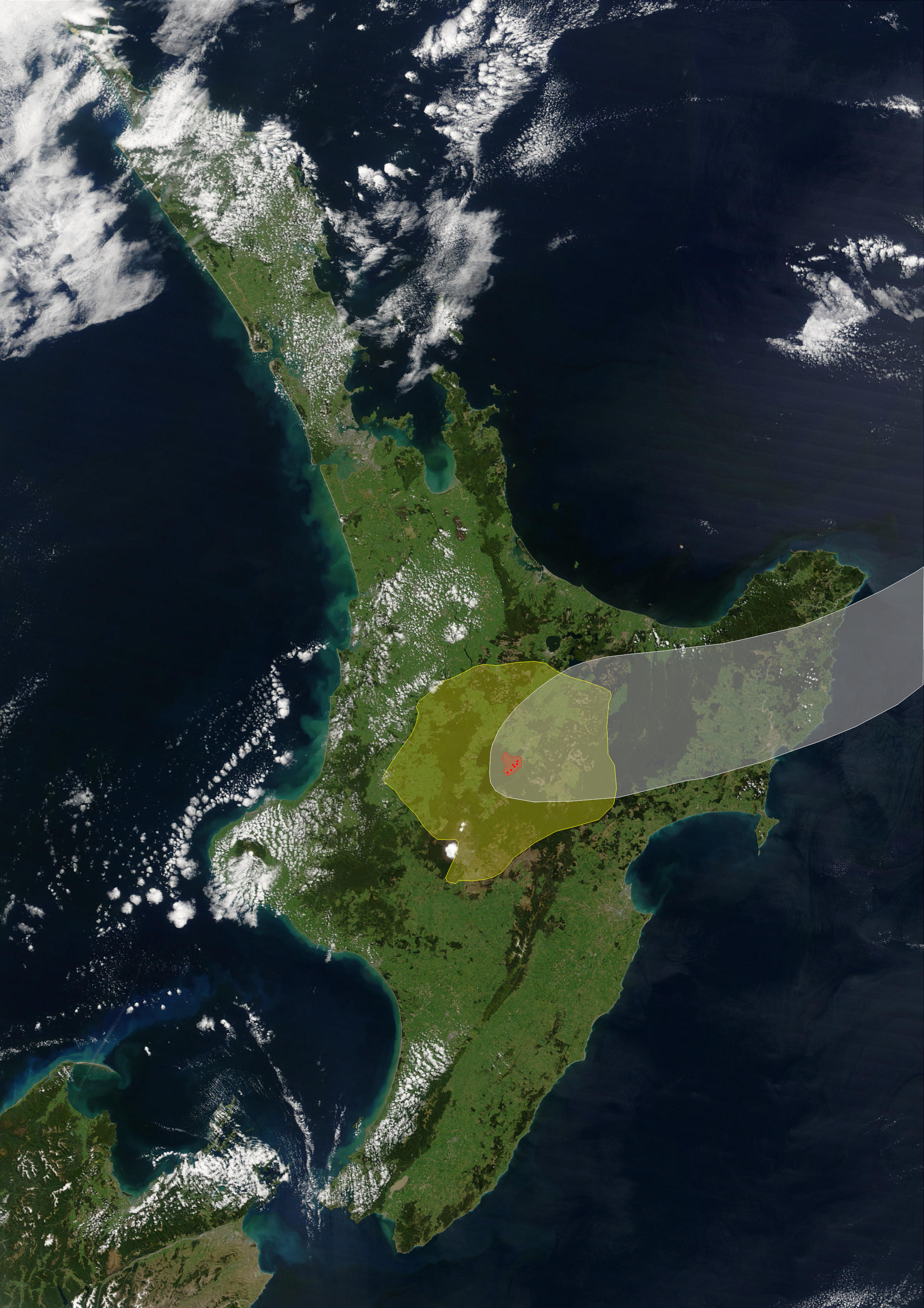
Hatepe eruption impact of a 10-cm ash deposit (white shading) and ignimbrite from pyroclastic flow (yellow shading). The collapse caldera is in light red. It is superimposed on the present day North Island.

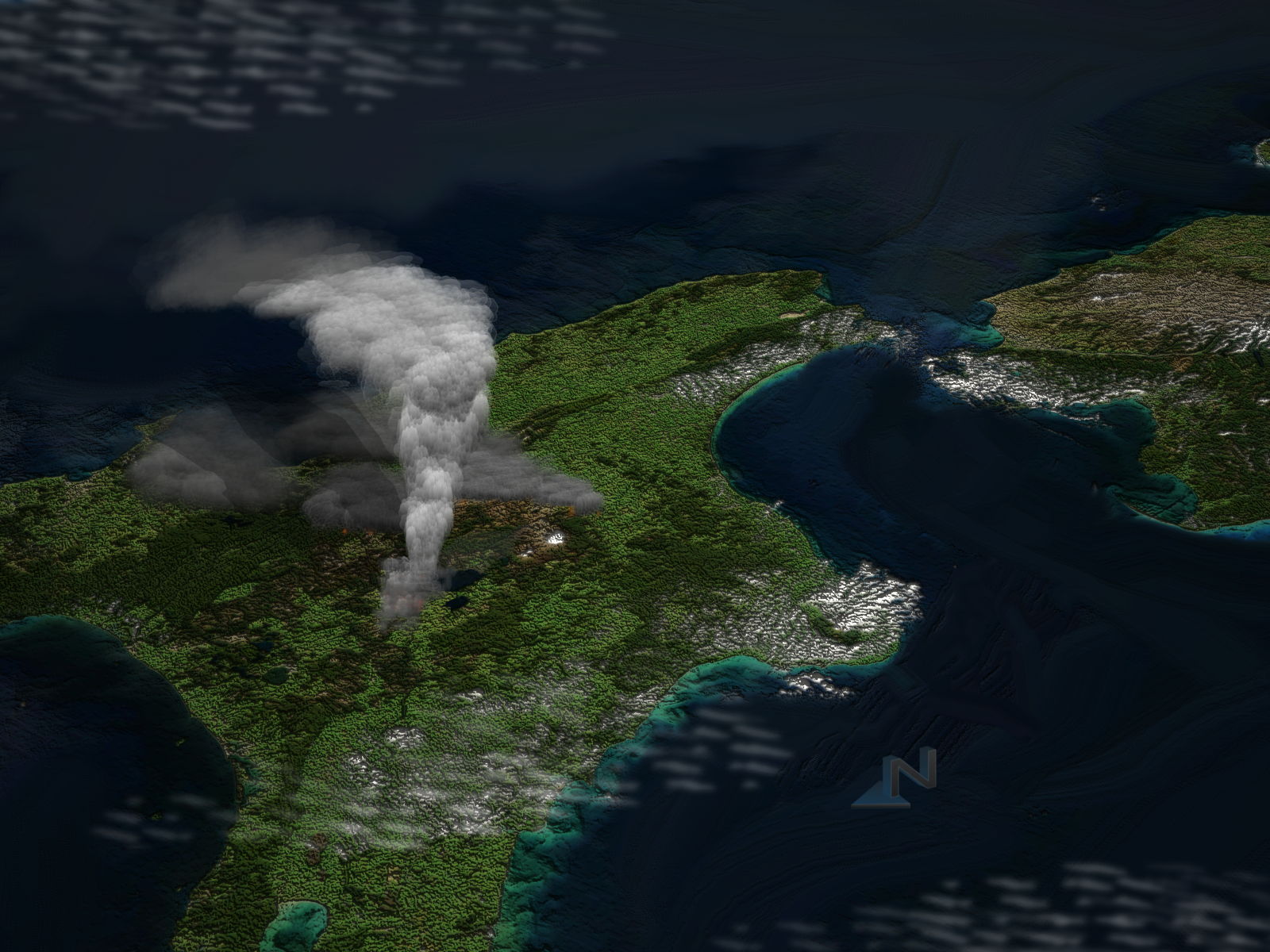
A large eruption column during the Oruanui eruption as it may have appeared from space

The Oruanui eruption (also known as the Kawakawa event) of the Taupō Volcano was the world's largest known eruption in the past 70,000 years, with a Volcanic Explosivity Index of 8. It occurred around 25,500 years ago and generated approximately 430 km^{3} (100 cu mi) of pyroclastic fall deposits, 320 km^{3} (77 cu mi) of pyroclastic density current (PDC) deposits (mostly ignimbrite) and 420 km^{3} (100 cu mi) of primary intracaldera material, equivalent to 530 km^{3} (130 cu mi) of magma.

Modern Lake Taupō partly fills the caldera generated during this eruption.

Tephra from the eruption covered much of the central North Island with ignimbrite up to 200 m (660 ft) deep. The ignimbrite eruption(s) were possibly not as forceful as that of the later Hatepe eruption but the total impact of this eruption was somewhat greater. Most of New Zealand was affected by ashfall, with an 18 cm (7.1 in) ash layer left even on the Chatham Islands, 850 km (530 mi) away which included diatoms from erupted lake sediments. Later erosion and sedimentation had long-lasting effects on the landscape, and caused the Waikato River to shift from the Hauraki Plains to its current course through the Waikato to the Tasman Sea.

== Hatepe eruption ==
The Hatepe eruption (also known as the Taupō or Horomatangi Reef Unit Y eruption) represents the most recent major eruption of the Taupō Volcano, and occurred about 1,800 years ago. It was the most powerful eruption in the world in the last 5,000 years. The type of eruption that occurred is the most extreme volcanic hazard due to the pyroclastic flows very high mobility and heat content. It has been stated to have had an energy release equivalent to about 150 ± 50 megatons of TNT.

=== Stages of eruption ===
The eruption went through several stages which were redefined in 2003 with at least 3 separate vents:

1. A minor eruption occurred beneath the ancestral Lake Taupō lasting hours, and producing 0.05 km^{3} (0.012 cu mi) of fine ash.
2. A dramatic increase in activity produced a high eruption column from a second vent, and 2.5 km^{3} (0.60 cu mi) dry ash.
3. A vent erupted mainly wet phreatoplinian ash but some dry magmatic ash to a total of 1.9 km^{3} (0.46 cu mi) over tens of hours.
4. Either a short break occurred or two vents became active at the same time with one producing a wet dark ash- and obsidian-rich 1.1 km^{3} (0.26 cu mi) fall deposit, the Rotongaio fine phreatoplinian ash. At the end of the last phase or beginning of this there was a period of heavy rainfall.
5. A larger dry eruption ensued, which erupted 7.7 km^{3} (1.8 cu mi) ash/pumice over a huge area, over up to 17 hours, before partial column collapse with as many as eleven dry pyroclastic flow density currents resulting in 1.5 km^{3} (0.36 cu mi) of local ignimbrite deposits to the east of the present lake.
6. The most destructive part of the eruption then occurred. Part of the vent area collapsed, as part of a process that unleashed about 30 km^{3} (7.2 cu mi) of material, that formed a fast-moving, 600–900 km/h (370–560 mph) pyroclastic flow lasting no more than 15 minutes.
7. Rhyolitic lava domes were extruded some years later, helping form the Horomatangi Reefs and Waitahanui bank. These later smaller eruptions of unknown total size also created large pumice rafts and terminated within decades of the major eruption.

The main pyroclastic flow devastated the surrounding area, climbing over 1,500 m (4,900 ft) to overtop the nearby Kaimanawa Ranges and Mount Tongariro, and covering the land within 80 ± 10 km (49.7 ± 6.2 mi) with ignimbrite from Rotorua to Waiouru. Only Ruapehu was high enough to divert the flow.

The power of the pyroclastic flow was so strong that in some places it eroded more material off the ground surface than it replaced with ignimbrite. Valleys were filled with ignimbrite, evening out the shape of the land.

All vegetation within the area was flattened. Loose pumice and ash deposits formed lahars down all the main rivers.

Temporary maximum lake areas after the 232 ± 10 CE Hatepe eruption (dark blue shading). Two temporary Lake Reporoa's were created transiently, the larger first, and the second later smaller and very transient, before the dam at the present Lake Taupō outlet failed.

The eruption further expanded the lake, which had formed after the much larger Oruanui eruption. Its new deposits also briefly created another large lake to the Taupō Volcano's north that extended to the Reporoa Caldera which in due course broke out into the Waikato River valley and released over a short period 2.5 km^{3} (0.60 cu mi) of water. The previous outlet of Lake Taupō was blocked, raising the lake 35 m (115 ft) above its present level, until shortly after the first smaller flood, it broke out in a huge flood, that released about 20 km^{3} (4.8 cu mi) of water.

=== Dating the Hatepe eruption ===
Many dates have been given for the Hatepe eruption. One estimated date was 181 CE from ice cores in Greenland and Antarctica. It is possible that the meteorological phenomena described by Fan Ye in China and by Herodian in Rome were due to this eruption, which would give a date of exactly 186. However, ash from volcanic activity does not normally cross hemispheres, and radiocarbon dating by R. Sparks has put the date at 233 CE ± 13 (95% confidence). A 2011 ^{14}C wiggle-matching paper gave the date 232 ± 5 CE. A 2021 review based on five sources reports 232 ± 10 CE.

New Zealand was unpopulated at that time, so the nearest humans would have been in Australia and New Caledonia, more than 2,000 km (1,200 mi) to the west and northwest.

== Current activity and future hazards ==
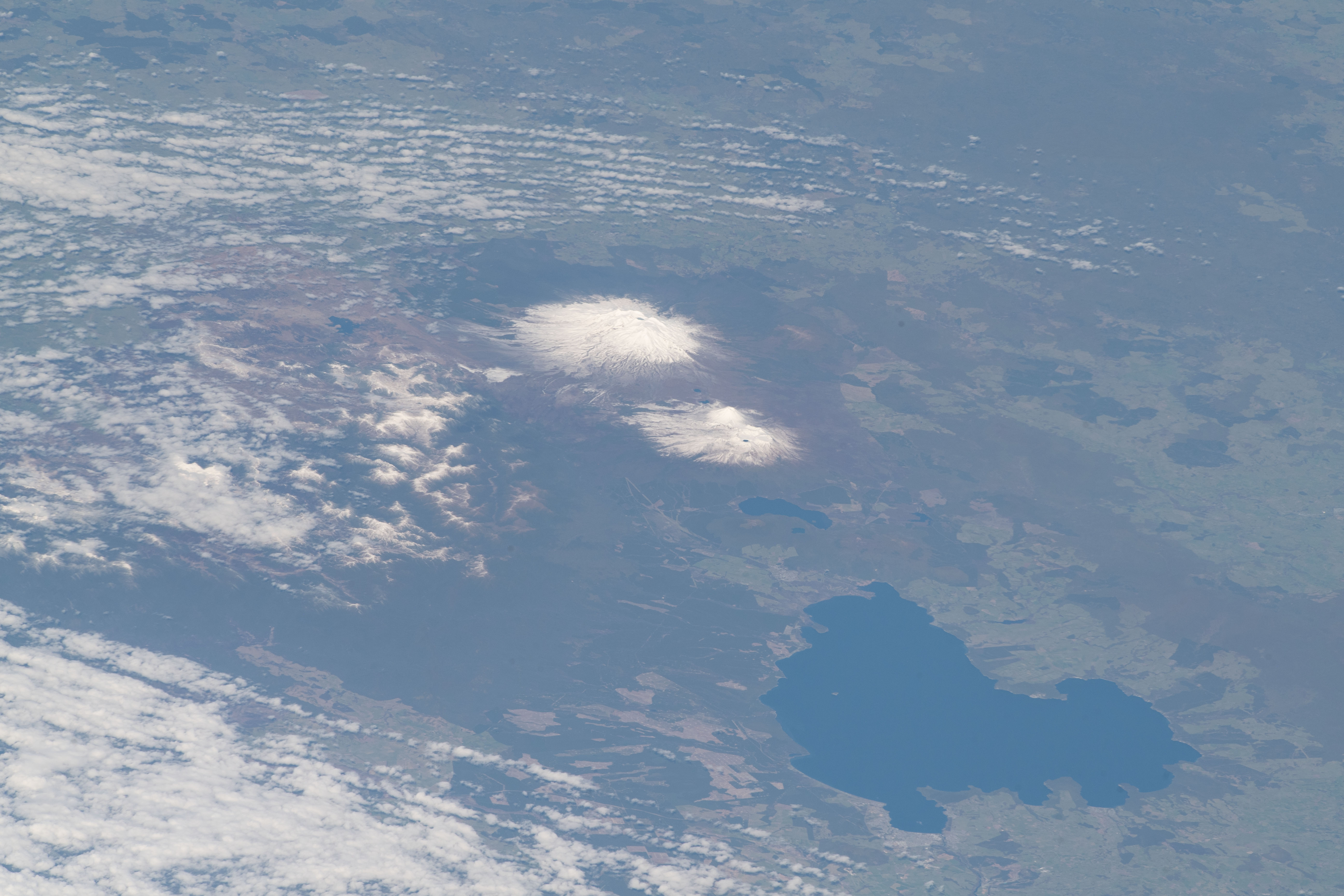
Taupō Volcano is mainly under the large blue Lake Taupō seen from its north from low earth orbit with beyond to its south the smaller Lake Rotoaira, and the active stratovolcanoes of Tongariro and Ruapehu covered in this picture with snow.

Composition studies suggest the Taupō Volcano has had historic vents to the south and north of the present lake, and recent seismic activity does extend beyond the lake to its north and south. To the north the border with the Maroa Caldera is ill-defined but most of the seismic activity is likely related to structures related to this caldera. While studies have identified one Taupō composition vent 20 km (12 mi) to the north of Lake Taupō, this presumably resulted from a dyke extusion about 26,000 years ago. Recent activity to the north of the lake is assigned in terms of magma bodies, to the Poihipi volcano under Wairakei. As of 2024 it is possible that Taupō is in a state of internal instability that is susceptible to dynamic triggering by tectonic earthquakes, as the 2016 Kaikōura earthquake triggered a deformation event in the north-west portion of the volcano without seismic or deformation events being observed in closer volcanoes to that earthquake's epicentre.

From May through December 2022 there was increased earthquake activity with lakeside slumping and inundation from a small tsunami and ground deformation. The Volcanic Alert Level for Taupō Volcano was raised to Volcanic Alert Level 1 (minor volcanic unrest) on 20 September 2022. In retrospect analysis was consistent with the largest M_{w} 5.2 earthquake being of volcano-tectonic origin linked to magmatic overpressure.

While no witnessed eruptive event has been recorded from Taupō, there have been seventeen episodes of volcanic unrest since 1872, with the most recent being in 2019 and 2022–2023. This manifested as swarms of seismic activity and ground deformation within the caldera. The present-day magma reservoir is estimated to be at least 250 km^{3} (60 cu mi) in volume and have a melt fraction of >20%–30%.

Unrest from May 1922 to January 1923 saw several thousand earthquakes, with the highest reaching magnitude 6, causing chimneys to collapse. The events were misreported internationally, which caused self-evacuations and a drop in tourism in Taupō and Rotorua. A source in San Francisco incorrectly reported that there had been 60 deaths, when there had been none. Consequentially, the government appointed a publicity officer.

While Taupō is capable of very large eruptions these remain very unlikely as the majority of the 29 eruptions of various magnitudes in the last 30,000 years have been much smaller. Many have been dome-forming, which may have contributed to lake features such as Motutaiko Island and the Horomatangi Reefs.

Earthquake and tsunami hazards also exist. While most earthquakes are relatively small and associated with magma shifts, the moderate earthquakes associated with eruptions or the numerous rift-associated faults historically have produced tsunami events. The intra-rift Waihi fault, for example, has been associated with 6.5 magnitude earthquakes at recurrence intervals of between 490 and 1,380 years and at least one tsunami related to landslip at the Hipaua steaming cliffs.

GNS Science continuously monitors Taupō using a network of seismographs and GPS stations. The Horomatangi Reefs area of the lake is associated with active hydrothermal venting and high heat flow. Monitoring of a volcano situated under a lake is challenging, and an eruption might occur with little or no meaningful notice. Live data can be viewed on the GeoNet website.

== History of geological understanding ==
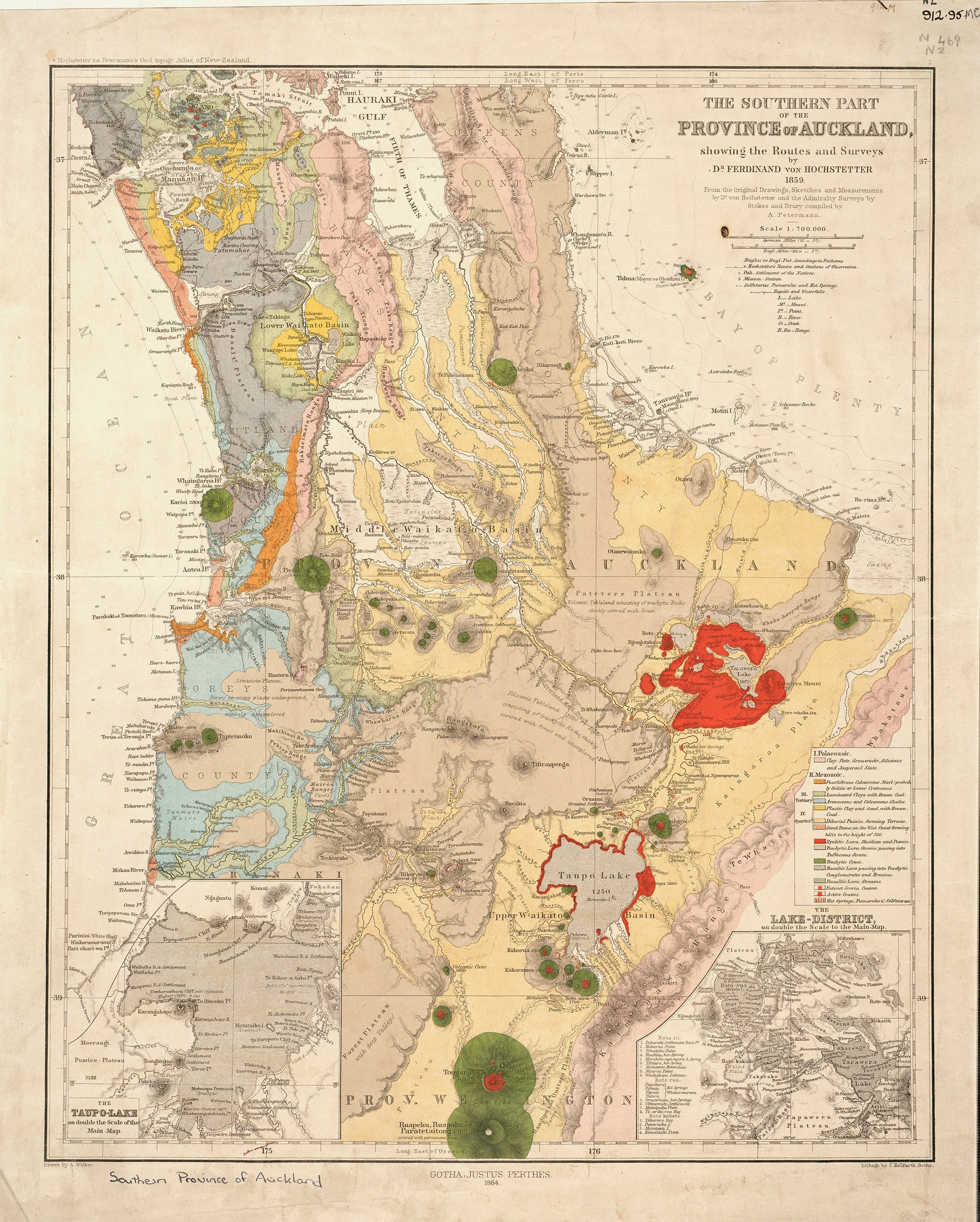
First map showing volcanic nature of Lake Taupō shoreline

While volcanism was recognised in the area following human occupation the recognition of the presence of a large volcano under Lake Taupō was not. Mātauranga Māori detailed that Horomātangi (Horo-matangi), a tāniwha or water monster of the lake, resided in a cave adjacent to Motutaiko Island on the south of the lake.

Ernst Dieffenbach described euptives now known to have been from the Taupō Volcano in his 1843 publication on New Zealand, but like many others until 1886 assigned them to the stratovolcanoes to the south of Lake Taupō. Ferdinand von Hochstetter may well have suspected a volcano at Taupō, and certainly identified Lake Taupō as the source of the pumice deposits along the Waikato River and interpreted the lake amongst the others in the region as caused by collapse in a volcanic plateau, but was unable to investigate to exclude other possibilities.

By 1864 information from Hochstetter's 1859 survey and those of Stokes and Drury was published as the first geological map of the area and this shows a rim of rhyolytic deposits around all the northern two thirds of the shore line of Lake Taupō but without the full extent of the relevant surface deposits being characterised. The area did not have a further high quality geological study until after the 1886 eruption of Mount Tarawera, and the discourse following this nearby eruption resulted in a much better understanding of volcanoes, including Taupō, so will be considered for context, to explain the shift in understanding from 1886 to 1888. Algernon Thomas interpreted this information to postulate that Taupō was a volcano. One of the people responsible for this lack of a survey was Sir James Hector who was Director of the New Zealand Geological Survey from 1865. When commissioned to provide the first official report on the 1886 eruption from Tarawera his travels included Taupō. The resulting report conclusion on the cause of the eruption "I think there can be little question that it is a purely hydro-thermal phenomenon, but on a gigantic scale; that it is quite local and not of deep-seated origin..." generated controversy with some supporting this view due to their geological understanding of the time.

Laurence Cussen, the District Surveyor in 1887 was unwilling to form a definite conclusion but observed "the jagged appearance of the volcanic rocks forming the steep northern and western shores leads at once to the conclusion that they were separated from the masses of which they originally formed part by some violent agency, either of eruption or subsidence. The islands and reefs in the lake are more than probably plugs of volcanic vents and lava-flows; and it would seem reasonable to infer that the lake owes its origin, firstly, to eruption, which was followed by a subsidence, and that subsequently some of the vents within it continued active as subaqueous volcanoes, the ejecta from which now form the comparatively level floor of the lake, having been worn away from the cones by denudation." He deferred to others who he was collaborating with, in the same timeframe, and as already mentioned Thomas first crystallised the possibility in the geological literature that there was a volcano under Lake Taupō as the likely source of the extensive surface pumice deposits from field work including analysis of specimens forwarded by Cussen.

In 1937 it was recognised that the deposit from the Hatepe eruption had been so hot to burn the forest over a 160 km (99 mi) distance, but this was not recognised as being due to a pyroclastic flow until 1956.

The date of the most recent large eruption was first defined in the 1960s as being in the first few centuries AD based on radiocarbon dating. In the 1970s activity was assigned as far back as 330,000 years ago with radiometric dating.

Further understanding of the size of the Hatepe eruption from the Taupō volcano with its pyroclastic flows and vent location resulted from the work of Colin Wilson from 1980 onward. The Oruanui eruption also became better understood with for example the influence of the eruptions on the sedimentology of the region taking several decades more to unravel. Volcanology better modelled the processes of magma formation and eruption, with wider acceptance of a predominant model for how rhyolite eruptives in these cases formed from mantle derived basalts by 20-30% assimilation of the greywacke basement and fractional crystallisation to produce a magma mush.

== See also ==
- Geology of New Zealand
- Geothermal areas in New Zealand
- Geothermal power in New Zealand
- List of volcanoes in New Zealand
- North Island Volcanic Plateau
- Rotorua Caldera
- Volcanism of New Zealand
