= Reporoa Caldera =

Volcanic caldera in New Zealand

- Location within North Island

Highest point
- Elevation: 592 m (1,942 ft)
- Coordinates: 38°25′00″S 176°20′00″E

Dimensions
- Length: 15 km (9.3 mi)
- Width: 10 km (6.2 mi)

Geography
- Location: Taupō Volcanic Zone, New Zealand

Geology
- Rock age: Pleistocene(0.281 Ma)
- Mountain type: Caldera
- Last eruption: 1180 (?), 2005 hydrothermal

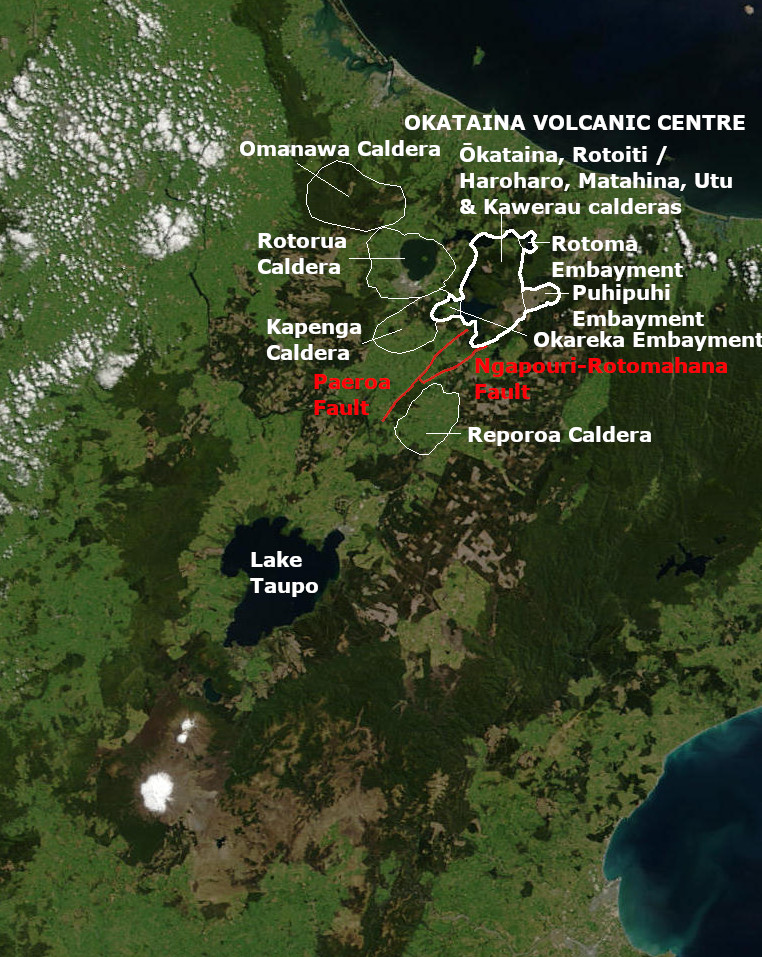
The Reporoa Caldera is to the east of the Paeroa Fault and south of the Ngapouri-Rotomahana Fault. It is accordingly south of the Okataina Volcanic Centre (approximate thick white border) and occupies a low land area between this and the Waikato River

The Reporoa Caldera is a 10 by 15 km (6.2 by 9.3 mi) caldera in New Zealand's Taupō Volcanic Zone located in the Taupō-Reporoa Basin. It formed some 280,000 years ago, in a large eruption that deposited approximately 100 km^{3} of tephra, forming the Kaingaroa Ignimbrite layer. The ignimbrite sheet extends up to 15 km (9.3 mi) to the east.

In April 2005, a large hydrothermal explosion occurred near a cow paddock within the Taupō-Reporoa Basin, destroying some trees, temporarily blocking a nearby stream and creating a 50 m (160 ft) crater at 38°32′02″S 176°10′19″E. A similar explosion happened in the area in 1948, and smaller explosions have happened in the years between. At the time of the last eruption, it was believed to be within the caldera, but these recent eruptions are not technically within the now known area of the caldera.

== Geography ==
The Reporoa Caldera is outlined approximately in red. Also shown are approximate sizes of the two temporary Lake Reporoa's created transiently after the 232 ± 10 CE Hatepe eruption, the first about 15 m (49 ft) higher than the later created when the volcanic dam of Lake Taupō broke. The Taupō-Reporoa Basin includes both the lakes and caldera and is not shown specifically.

The Reporoa Caldera is located in the northern part of the Taupō-Reporoa Basin, which extends north-east from Lake Taupō in the south to the Waiotapu geothermal area, and whose southern features are distinct from the caldera. The Waikato River where it leaves Lake Taupō enters the south east corner of the basin and is flanked by geothermal areas developed for power near Wairakei. In the north-west, the basin rises up to the Paeroa Range whose western limit is defined by the Paeroa Fault scarp. The hills of the eastern basin margin are mostly covered by the Kaingaroa Forest. The Waikato River loops to the north before exiting the basin at its south-west but is always south of the caldera.

The basin has been the location of several temporary lakes during its volcanic history and one long term lake that lasted about 200,000 years. The long term lake was Lake Huka which was destroyed in the 25,600 years ago Oruanui eruption.

After the Oruanui eruption there is evidence for a Lake Reporoa temporary lake in the Reporoa Basin which has some uncertainty about its height at various times. The highest shoreline terrace is about 360 m (1,180 ft) and lake deposits are up to 400 m (1,300 ft) above today's sea level. This lake may have partially drained before the main break-out flood from Lake Taupō, and was certainly destroyed during the break-out flood that followed the Oruanui eruption,, at which time its level may have been about 320 m (1,050 ft) above present sea level.

After the Taupō Hatepe eruption about 1,800 years ago, the largest recent Lake Reporoa formed . This lake occupied up to 190 km^{2} (73 sq mi) of the basin impounding about 2.5 km^{3} (0.60 cu mi) of water. In due course its volcanic dam was breached with a resulting initial flood down the Waikato River. This flood is known to have been before the later breaching of a further upstream ignimbrite dam, also formed by the same eruption, at present outlet of the Lake Taupō. This greater breach released about 20 km^{3} (4.8 cu mi) of water, which temporarily flooded for no more than a week, some of the area of the former Lake Reporoa to 303 m (994 ft) above present sea level.

=== Geology ===
Map to show surface volcanic deposits of Kaingaroa ignimbrite and Reporoa Caldera (light green shading). Legend: Key for the volcanics that are shown with panning is: basalt (shades of brown/orange); monogenetic basalts; undifferentiated basalts of the Tangihua Complex in Northland Allochthon; arc basalts; arc ring basalts; dacite; andesite (shades of red); basaltic andesite; rhyolite (ignimbrite is lighter shades of violet); plutonic; White shading is selected caldera features.; Clicking on the rectangle icon enables full window and mouse-over with volcano name/wikilink and ages before present.

It was first recognised as a volcanic caldera in 1994 and later work has defined it as a single major event caldera within the Taupō Rift. Initially the age was thought to be 0.23 Ma but is now thought to be about 50,000 years older at 281 ± 21 ka BP. This age is more consistent with argon–argon dating on the tephra, ignimbrite and samples from the later smaller rhyolite dome eruptions that happened after caldera formation. One of these was at Deer Hill, which is just to the south of the caldera margin and is dated at 264 ± 4 ka BP. Within the southern area of the caldera proper Pukekahu (263 ± 5 ka BP), and Kairuru (247 ± 2 ka BP) formed. Gravitational and magnetic studies have been used to define the caldera to being north of the present Waikato River course in the Taupō-Reporoa Basin. A relative gravity low does exist south-west of the river and caldera in the Mihi area and has been called the Mihi volcanic depression, although there is presently no evidence of a related volcanic event. The Reporoa Caldera is associated with three geothermal fields. These are the active Reporoa geothermal field in the caldera, the Waiotapu geothermal area north of the caldera rim, and the Broadlands thermal area to the south.

== See also ==
- List of volcanoes in New Zealand
- "Reporoa". Global Volcanism Program. Smithsonian Institution.
