= Volcanic dam =

Natural dam produced directly or indirectly by volcanism

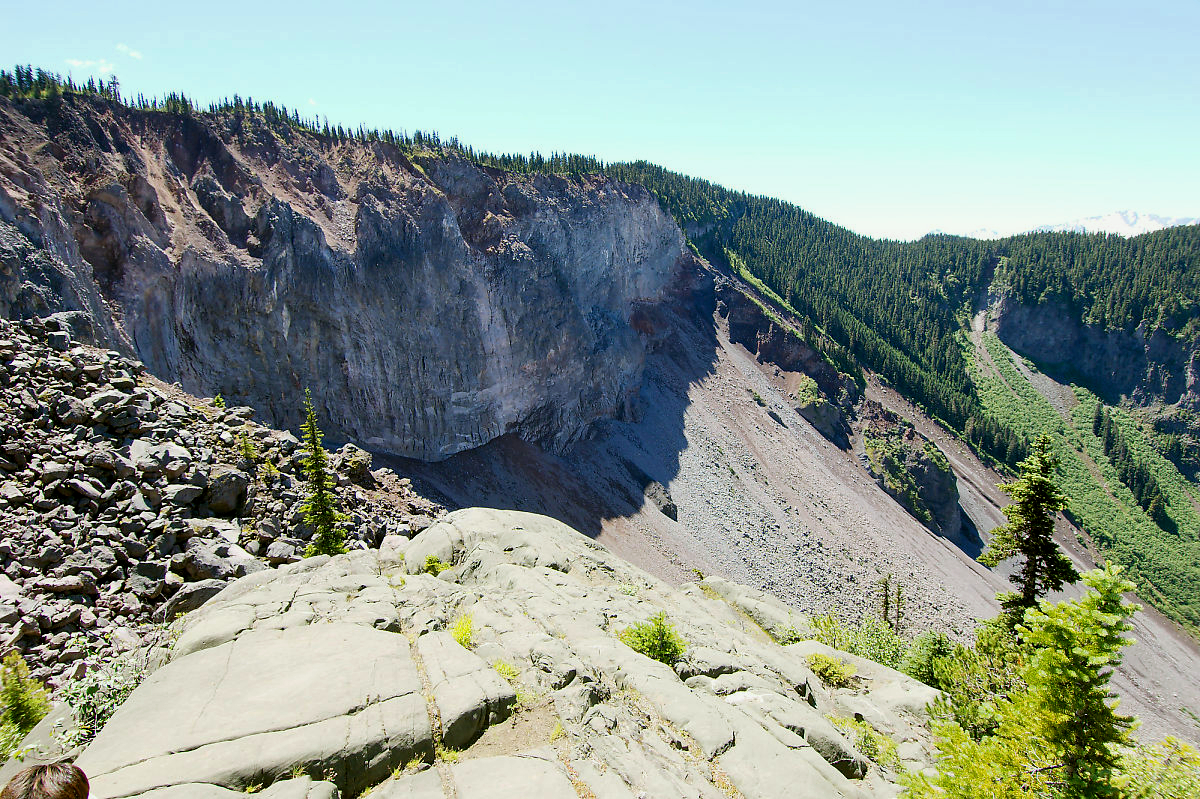
The edge of The Barrier in British Columbia, Canada

A volcanic dam is a type of natural dam produced directly or indirectly by volcanism, which holds or temporarily restricts the flow of surface water in existing streams, like a man-made dam. There are two main types of volcanic dams: those created by the flow of molten lava, and those created by the primary or secondary deposition of pyroclastic material and debris. This classification generally excludes other, often larger and longer-lived dam-type geologic features, separately termed crater lakes, although these volcanic centers may be associated with the source of material for volcanic dams, and the lowest portion of its confining rim may be considered as such a dam, especially if the lake level within the crater is relatively high.

Volcanic dams generally occur worldwide, in association with former and active volcanic provinces, and are known to have existed in the geologic record, in historic times, and in the present day. Their removal or failure is similarly recorded. Their longevity and extent varies widely, having periods ranging from a few days, weeks, or years to several hundred thousand years or more, and dimensions ranging from a few meters to several thousand.

The emplacement, internal structure, distribution, and longevity of such dams can be related variously to the amount, rapidity, and duration of (primary) geothermal energy released and the rock material made available; other considerations include the rock types produced, their physical and toughness characteristics, and their various modes of deposition. Depositional modes include gravity flow of molten lava at the surface, gravity flow or fall of pyroclastics through the air, and the redistribution and transportation of those materials by gravity and water.

== Lava dam ==
Lava dams are formed by lava flowing or spilling into a river valley in sufficient quantity and height to temporarily overcome the explosive nature (steam) of its contact with water, and the erosive force of flowing water to remove it. The latter depends on the quantity of water flow and stream gradient. The lava may flow during numerous successive or repetitive eruptions and may emanate from single or numerous vents or fissures. Lava of this nature, like basalt, is usually associated with less-explosive eruptions; more-viscous lavas with lower mafic content, like dacites and rhyolites, can also flow, but tend to be more closely associated with eruptions of greater explosiveness and the formation of pyroclastics.

Once initially established, continued lava flow creates a steeper upstream face as it battles the rising water, but with most lava flowing unimpeded downstream, covering the now-dried river bed and its alluvial sediments, sometimes for miles. Thus emplaced, the shape of a lava dam resembles an elongated blob, wedged in the valley bottom. At the same time, the water continues to flow, and the lake continues to rise and accumulate sediment, which previously had migrated unimpeded downstream. Sediment filling, over-topping, downward erosion, waterfalls, and under-cutting inevitably follow, unless an alternative outlet is established, for water and sediment elsewhere in the drainage.

Large examples of lava dams from the geologic record include those repeatedly developed from the western side of the Grand Canyon, with the largest remnant now termed Prospect Dam, and in several locations within the Snake River drainage. The former Lake Idaho, which existed for more than 6.5 million years, filled behind such a structure and created the western section of the Snake River Plain, and accumulated 4,000 ft (1,200 m) of lake sediments. Other locations include near American Falls, Idaho, and numerous others. Many of these were overtopped, washed out, or skirted by the outburst flood originating from ancestral Lake Bonneville.

Many other examples exist globally, including Caburgua Lake in Chile, Mývatn in Iceland, Lava Butte in Oregon, and Lava Lake and The Barrier in British Columbia.

== Pyroclastic dam ==
Pyroclastic dams are created in an existing drainage either by their direct emplacement or by the accumulation of widely variable pyroclastic particles, broadly termed tephra. Unlike lava dams, which are formed by the coherent, gravity-driven flow of molten rock, filling the valley bottom directly and solidifying rapidly from the outside inward, pyroclastic dams are produced by less-coherent airborne gravity currents or falls of tephra particles from the atmosphere, which solidify on the surface more slowly from the inner portion outward; pyroclastics are also deposited both in the valley bottom and widely distributed on the adjacent slopes. Their airborne nature is less restricted to the immediate drainage, and they may roil over drainage boundaries; their particulate components allow for continued redistribution after initial placement by gravity and water. The explosiveness of pyroclastic eruptions, both laterally and vertically, range from fiery surges, to hot flows, to warm falls of tephra; the former may tend to emplace a dam directly while the latter tends to enhance placement or provide additional material. Generally speaking, unless violently expelled, larger-sized tephra falls closest to the crater and smaller tephra lands farther away, with its distribution more highly influenced by prevailing wind velocity and direction.

Once initially established, a pyroclastic dam's continued existence remains a balance between its slowly-consolidating hardness and toughness, and the amount and velocity of flowing water's ability to erode it. Unconsolidated tephra is quickly moved by precipitation and flowing water in drainages, at times creating a lahar. Upstream of the dam, this material would rapidly accumulate to fill the lake, and downstream it would tend to erode its slopes and base. The often-rapid accumulation of unconsolidated pyroclastic material on steep sideslopes tends to be inherently unstable over time; pyroclastic dams may be emplaced by the landsliding of such material into rivers and streams. Pyroclastic material, given sufficient time to consolidate or "weld" into hard rock, produces assemblages variously classified as ignimbrites, variously brecciated or agglomerated, along with various types of tuffs and volcanic ash, and are mostly of felsic composition.

While evidence of pyroclastic dams occur within the geologic record, such as Lake Reporoa in New Zealand, they are best known and studied in relation to recent and current volcanic eruptions. Examples worldwide include associations with El Chichon in Mexico and the Karymsky Volcano in Russia. The caldera lake associated with Taal Volcano, which was previously open to the South China Sea, was permanently closed by a pyroclastic dam during the 1749 eruption, and remains in equilibrium at a higher level to this day, while the pyroclastic dam comprising the low rim of crater Lake Nyos in Cameroon is considered less stable.

== Hazards ==
Like all forms of natural dams, the erosion or failure of volcanic dams can produce catastrophic floods, debris flows, and associated landslides, depending on the size of the impounded lake.

== See also ==
- Volcanic plateau – Plateau produced by volcanic activity
