= Paeroa Fault =

Active fault in New Zealand

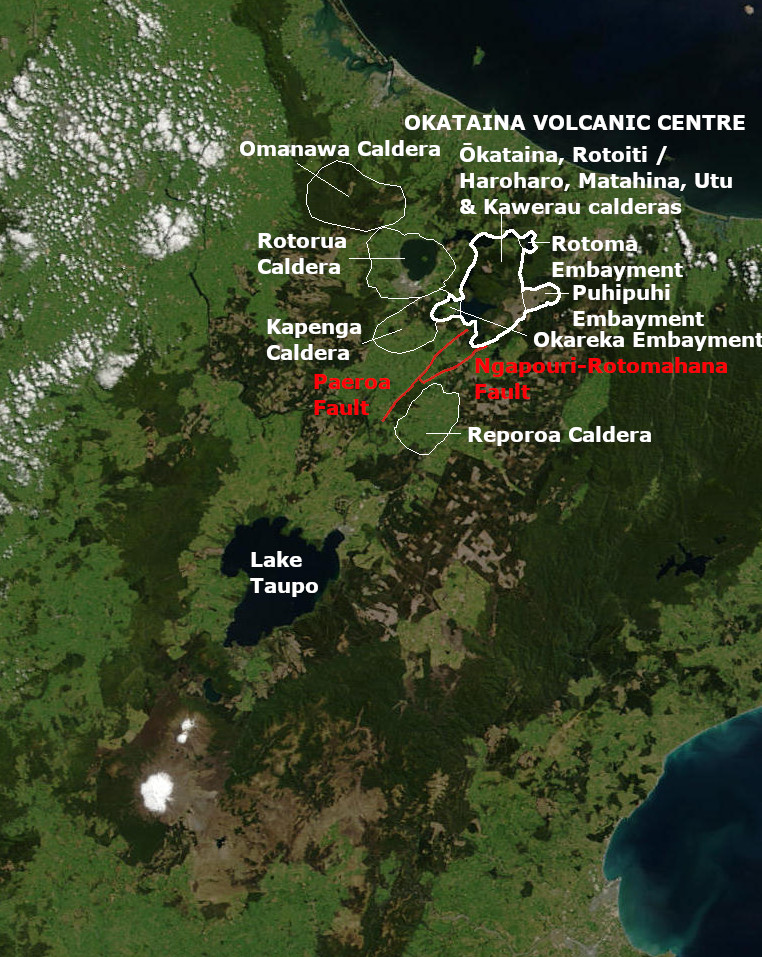
- The Paeroa Fault (left in red) is associated with the splay Ngapouri-Rotomahana Fault (right in red) in the Taupō Rift, North Island, New Zealand
- Etymology: Paeroa Range (no relation to town of same name, pae (Māori for 'ridge') and roa (Māori for 'long'))
- Coordinates: 38°23′17″S 176°14′48″E
- Country: New Zealand
- Region: Waikato Region

Characteristics
- Range: Up to 6.8 Mw
- Segments: 3
- Length: 30 km (19 mi)
- Strike: 40° to 50°
- Displacement: 1.1 mm (0.043 in)/yr to 1.7 mm (0.067 in)/yr

Tectonics
- Plate: Indo-Australian
- Status: Active
- Type: Normal fault
- Age: Miocene-Holocene
- Volcanic arc/belt: Taupō Volcanic Zone
- New Zealand geology database (includes faults)

The Paeroa Fault is a seismically active area in the Taupō District, Waikato Region of the central North Island of New Zealand.

== Geology ==
North of Lake Taupō, volcanic ignimbrite at least 500 metres (1,600 ft) thick, and called the Paeroa Ignimbrite (dated to 339 ± 5 ka) is exposed along the very steep fault scarp of the Paeroa Fault that defines the western flank of the 979 metres (3,212 ft) high Paeroa Range. The Paeroa Ignimbrite appears to have been erupted from a linear vent alignment parallel to the current Paeroa Range and fault. This fault area of the Taupō Rift is displacing at a rate of 7.2 ± 0.4 mm (0.283 ± 0.016 in)/year. At the north eastern end of the fault is the geothermally active Maungaongaonga volcano that with the fault defines the far south western border of the Ōkataina Volcanic Centre. The Ngapouri-Rotomahana Fault too extends to the Ōkataina Caldera and is a splay from the Paeroa Fault.

The southern portion of the fault is associated with the raised Paeroa Fault block immediately to its east which is the largest ground surface fault block within the Taupō Volcanic Zone. The raised block further to the east goes into the down lands associated with the Reporoa Caldera that extend to form the Taupo-Reporoa Basin. To the west is the adjacent Te Weta Fault block in what has been called the Paeroa Garben, a rift valley that extends to the presently much less tectonically active Horohoro Fault.

== Risks ==
This intra-rift fault has been estimated to have single event earthquakes in its northern portion about 6.4 Mw and for the whole fault, rupture intensity of about 6.8 Mw with up to 2.5 metres (8 ft 2 in) upward displacement. Almost half of rupture events in the last 16,000 years have been associated with nearby volcanic eruptions so it is not only the direct earthquake impact that may be important. The Mamaku eruption of about 8000 years ago and Rotoma eruption of about 9500 years ago of the Ōkataina Caldera are associated in time with deposits indicating the earthquake fault rupture events took place either just before or during the eruption sequence.
