= Ngapouri-Rotomahana Fault =

Fault in New Zealand

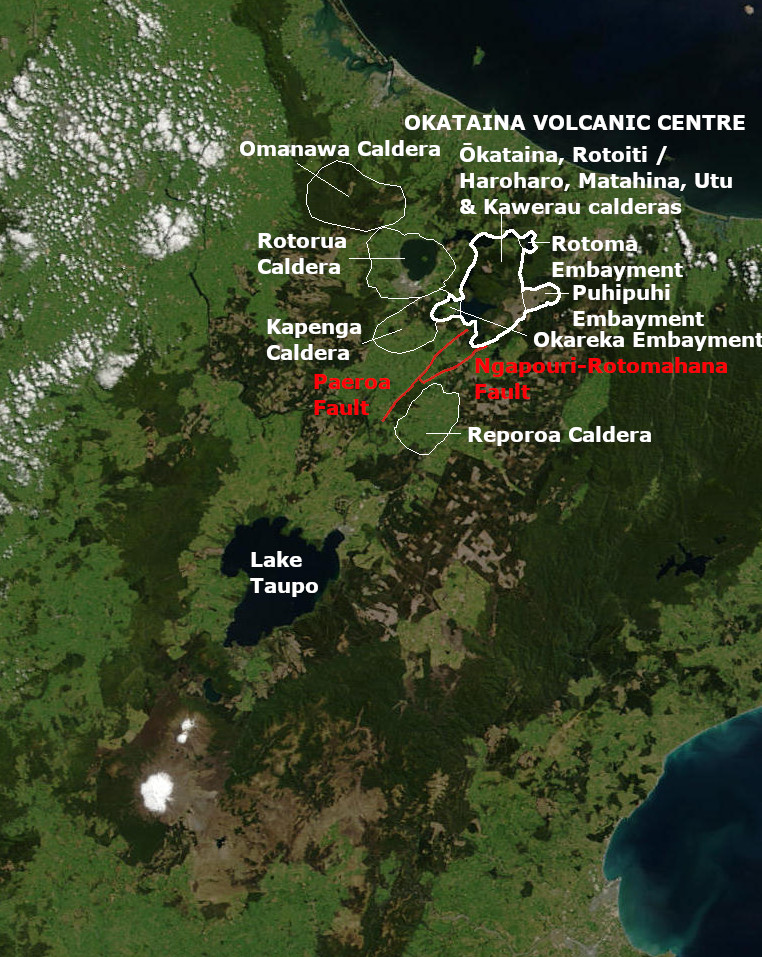
- The Ngapouri-Rotomahana Fault (right in red) is a splay fault off the Paeroa Fault (left in red) in the Taupō Rift, North Island, New Zealand
- Etymology: Lake Ngāpouri and Lake Rotomahana
- Coordinates: 38.318°S 176.4°E
- Country: New Zealand
- Region: Waikato and Bay of Plenty Regions

Characteristics
- Range: up to 6.4 Mw
- Segments: 2 (Rotomahana Fault and Ngapouri Fault)
- Length: 15 km (9.3 mi)
- Displacement: 1.0 mm (0.039 in)/yr

Tectonics
- Plate: Indo-Australian
- Status: Active
- Type: Normal fault
- Age: Miocene-Holocene
- Volcanic arc/belt: Taupō Volcanic Zone
- New Zealand geology database (includes faults)

The Ngapouri-Rotomahana Fault is a seismically and volcanically active area of the central North Island of New Zealand.

== Geology ==
Coming from the south the Ngapouri-Rotomahana Fault can be interpreted as a splay of the Paeroa Fault beneath the still geothermally active volcano of Maungaongaonga which defines the most western aspect of the Okataina Volcanic Centre at the eastern margin of the Taupō Rift of the Taupō Volcanic Zone. Between the two active south-east dipping faults is a short segment of fault that is atypically north-west dipping and at 90 degrees to the rift zone axis. Since however the Taupō Rift itself takes a 20 degree change of direction to the south and the dominant rift widening is actually in the Bay of Plenty and has decreased by half to a displacement rate of 7.2 ± 0.4 mm/yr at this part of the rift system other interpretations might be more logical. Certainly there is a discontinuity, associated with the Okataina Volcanic Centre between the south-east dipping intra-rift normal Edgecumbe Fault that currently defines the main eastern intra-rift fault in the Bay of Plenty part of the Taupō Rift and the south-east dipping intra-rift northern segment of the Ngapouri-Rotomahana Fault, the Rotomahana Fault. This transitions into the Ngapouri Fault (its southern segment) and this then intersects the Paeroa Fault, with the last part of the intersection having a completely different orientation.

== Risks ==
Complete rupture of this intra-rift fault occurred just before one major recent volcanic event, being the 1314±12 CE Kaharoa eruption of Mount Tarawera and was associated in time with multiple large hydrothermal eruptions to the south of the Ngapouri Fault that created craters on the southern slopes of Maunga Kākaramea (Rainbow Mountain) and around Lakes Ngāpouri (Opouri) and Tutaeinanga and covered that locality with hydrothermal mud. Some of the Ngapouri Fault area in turn was covered by about 1 metre (3 ft 3 in) of Rotomahana mud from the western aspects of the 1886 eruption of Mount Tarawera to its north. On the 14 December 1983 there was a shallow magnitude 5.1 shock, on or close to the Ngapouri fault, near Waiotapu which did a moderate amount of property damage.
