= Hatepe eruption =

Major eruption of Taupō volcano

- Volcano: Lake Taupō
- Date: About 230 CE
- Type: Phreatomagmatic, ultra-Plinian
- Location: Lake Taupō, North Island, New Zealand; 38°49′S 175°55′E
- VEI: 7
- Impact: Devastated vegetation in region, expanded Lake Taupō, flooded the Waikato River

Maps
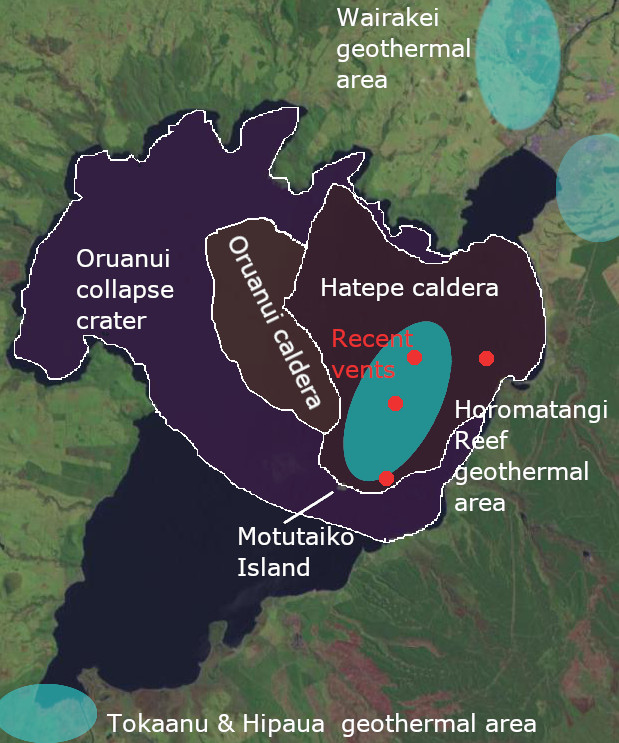
- {{{map-caption}}}

The Hatepe eruption, named for the Hatepe Plinian pumice tephra layer, sometimes referred to as the Taupō eruption or Horomatangi Reef Unit Y eruption, is dated to 232 CE ± 10 and was Taupō Volcano's most recent major eruption. It is thought to be New Zealand's largest eruption within the last 20,000 years. The eruption ejected some 45–105 km^{3} (11–25 cu mi) of bulk tephra, of which just over 30 km^{3} (7.2 cu mi) was ejected in approximately 6–7 minutes. This makes it one of the largest eruptions in the last 5,000 years, comparable to the Minoan eruption in the 2nd millennium BCE, the 946 eruption of Paektu Mountain, the 1257 eruption of Mount Samalas, and the 1815 eruption of Mount Tambora.

== Stages of the eruption ==
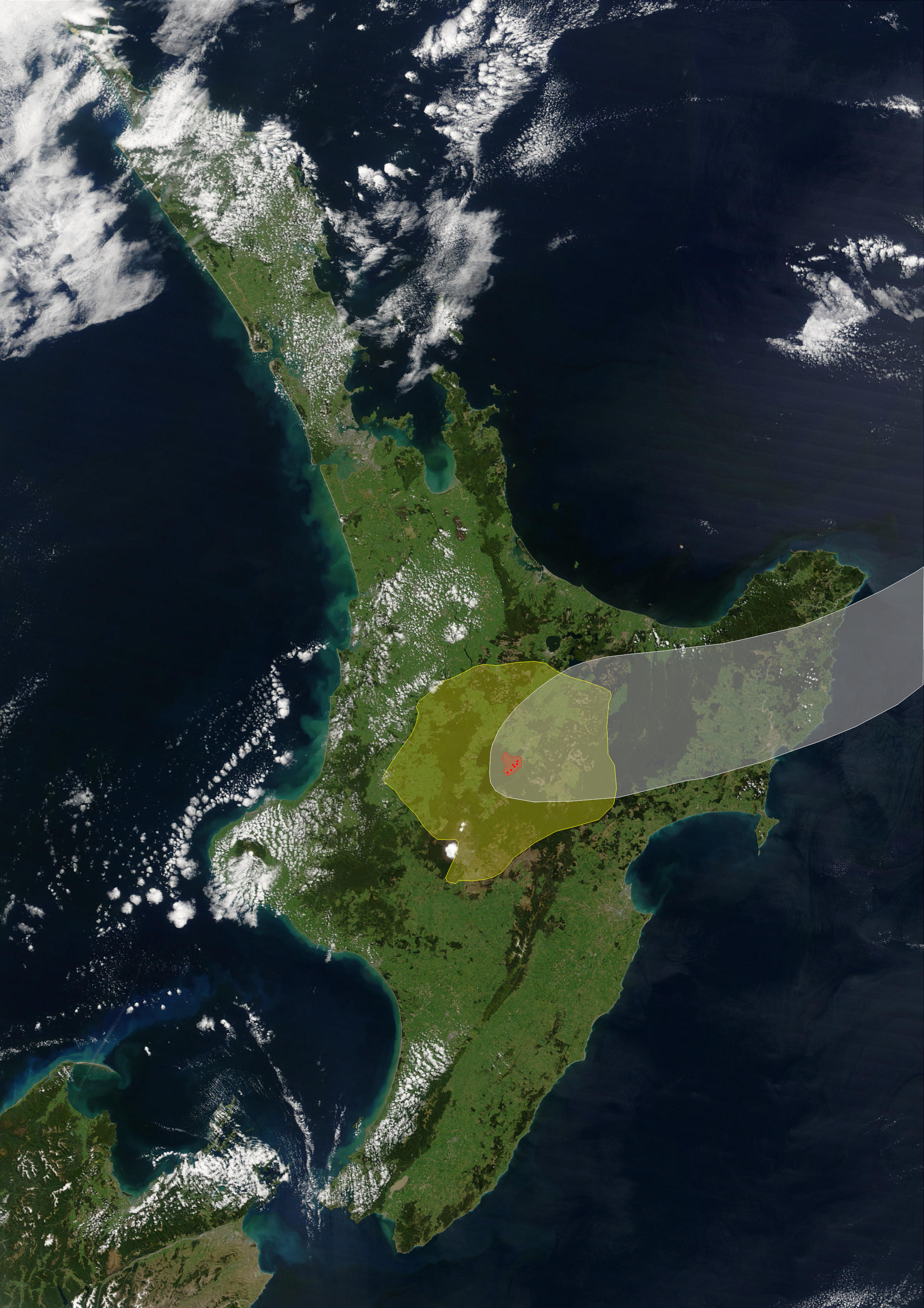
Hatepe eruption impact on the North Island of a 10 cm ash deposit (white shading) and ignimbrite from pyroclastic flow (yellow shading). The collapse caldera is in light red. It is superimposed on present day New Zealand.

The eruption went through several stages, with six distinct marker horizons identified, although phase 5 has at least 26 deposit subunits. Most of the stages only affected the immediate surrounds of the caldera and regions to its east due to prevailing wind patterns. Despite the uniform composition of the erupted magma, a wide variety of eruptive styles were displayed, including weak phreatomagmatism, Plinian eruptions, and a huge pyroclastic flow. Rhyolitic lava domes were extruded some years or decades later, forming the Horomatangi Reefs and Waitahanui Bank.

The main extremely fast moving pyroclastic flow travelled at close to the speed of sound and devastated the surrounding area, climbing more than 1,500 m (4,900 ft) to overtop the nearby Kaimanawa Ranges and Mount Tongariro, and covering the land within 80 km (50 mi) with ignimbrite. Only Ruapehu was high enough to divert the flow. The power of the pyroclastic flow was so strong that in some places it eroded more material off the ground surface than it replaced with ignimbrite. There is evidence that it occurred on an autumn afternoon and its energy release was about 150 megatons of TNT equivalent. The eruption column penetrated the stratosphere as revealed by deposits in ice core samples in Greenland and Antarctica. As New Zealand was not settled by the Māori until more than 1,000 years later, the area had no known human inhabitants when the eruption occurred. Tsunami deposits from the same period have been found on the central New Zealand coast, evidence that the eruption probably caused meteotsunamis locally, and much more widespread waves may have been generated (like those observed after the 1883 Krakatoa eruption). The stages as reclassified from 2003 are:

Hatepe eruption stages
| Stage | Deposit | Type | Volume | Timing and comment |
|---|---|---|---|---|
| 1 | unit Y1 | Phreatomagmatic fine ash | 0.05 km^{3} (0.012 cu mi) | Hours, south-western fissure vent with maximum plume height of 10 km (6.2 mi). |
| 2 | unit Y2 | Mainly magmatic dry ash and coarse Hatepe pumice | 2.5 km^{3} (0.60 cu mi) | 10 to 30 hours, plinian. |
| 3 | unit Y3 | Mainly phreatoplinian Hatepe ash but interrupted by dry magmatic ash | 1.9 km^{3} (0.46 cu mi) | Up to tens of hours with towards end or beginning of next stage heavy rain. |
| 4 | unit Y4 | Rotongaio fine phreatoplinian ash | 1.1 km^{3} (0.26 cu mi) | Likely continuous with Y3, vent at the north-east end of fissure. |
| 5 | unit Y5a | Dry vesicular pumice and ash | 7.7 km^{3} (1.8 cu mi) | Up to 17 hours, vent(s) more towards south-west of fissure. Eruption plume up to 40 km (25 mi) high. |
| | unit Y5b | Dry pyroclastic flow | 1.5 km^{3} (0.36 cu mi) | Collapse of 5a eruptive column. |
| 6 | unit Y6 | Taupō ignimbrite | 30 km^{3} (7.2 cu mi) | No more than 15 minutes with speed of 250–300 m/s (820–980 ft/s) or 900–1,080 km/h (560–670 mi/h). |
| 7 | Horomatangi Reefs and Waitahanui Bank | Rhyolite lava domes | 0.28 km^{3} (0.067 cu mi) | Up to decades after. |

== After ==
Temporary maximum lake areas after the 232 ± 10 CE Hatepe eruption (dark blue shading). Two temporary Lake Reporoa's were created transiently, the larger first, and the second later smaller and very transient, when the dam at the present Lake Taupō outlet failed.

It is estimated that it might have taken as much as 30 years to refill the emptied lake in the caldera. There were massive changes in the landscape for 40 km (25 mi) around with all life sterilised and prior landforms evened out, with beyond the ignimbrite sheet likely forest fires and ash associated die back especially to the west. In 1937 it was recognised that the deposit from the Hatepe eruption had been so hot to burn the forest at a 160 km (99 mi) distance from Lake Taupō, but this was not understood as being due to a pyroclastic flow until 1956. Valleys had been filled with ignimbrite, evening out the shape of the land.

The Waikato River had been blocked by ignimbrite deposits with the lowest blockage on the river being at Orakei Korako. A temporary lake above this blockage was formed over perhaps 2 to 3 years in the older Reporoa Caldera, maximising to an area of about 90 km^{2} (35 sq mi) and a volume of about 2.5 km^{3} (0.60 cu mi). This broke through the ignimbrite dam in a massive flood with peak flow believed to be 17,000 m^{3}/s, over 100 times the current river maximum flood flow.

In due course after the Hatepe eruption the lake that formed further expanded on the lake that had formed after the much larger Oruanui eruption around 26,500 years ago. The previous outlet was blocked, raising the lake 35 meters (115 feet) above its present level until it broke out after about 20 years in a huge flood. Over 20 km^{3} (4.8 cu mi) of water escaped down river in less than 4 weeks, with peak discharge of the order of 30,000 m^{3}/s so flowing for more than a week at roughly 200 times the Waikato River's current rate.

Following the eruption rhyolitic lava domes were extruded, these smaller eruptions of unknown total size also created large pumice rafts that were later discovered deposited on the lake shoreline. The volcano continues to be classified as active with periods of volcanic unrest.

== Dating the eruption ==
Early radiocarbon dating effort on 22 selected carbonized samples yielded an uncalibrated average date of 1,819 ± 17 years BP (131 CE ± 17). Research by Colin J. N. Wilson and others remarked that ongoing calibration pushes the radiocarbon result to a more recent date, and they proposed 186 CE as the exact year of eruption based on ancient Chinese and Roman records of unusual atmospheric phenomena in about this year.

In an effort led by R.S.J. Sparks and others to investigate interhemispheric calibration offset in 1995, the team analyzed the uncalibrated ages of tree rings of a single tree killed in Taupo eruption, cross-matched the uncalibrated tree ring chronology to Northern Hemisphere calibration curve, and extrapolated the calibrated tree ring dates to obtain the outermost ring date of 232 CE ± 15, i.e. the last moment the tree was alive.

In 2012, to circumvent interhemispheric calibration offset, the uncalibrated dates of tree rings of a single tree killed in Taupo eruption were wiggle-matched to New Zealand-derived calibration data set to obtain the currently most precise eruption date of 232 CE ± 8 (95.4% confidence). This date is statistically indistinguishable from that of 1995 study and is the currently accepted date. It is suggested that the presence of magmatic carbon in pre-eruption groundwaters may have contaminated radiocarbon ages. However, rhyolitic shards derived from the Taupo eruption have been identified in the Roosevelt Island ice core and are independently dated to 230 CE ± 19, thus refuting propositions of a potential age bias. These dates are also within a wider range of 205 CE to 373 CE determined by paleomagnetic dating but the age continues to be slightly controversial, for the reasons mentioned.

== Post-eruption soil deficiencies ==
The tephra soils associated with the eruption were deficient in several essential minerals, with cobalt deficiency being the cause of bush sickness in animals that precluded productive livestock farming until this issue was identified and addressed. This identification by New Zealand government scientists in 1934 was probably the most significant single advance in New Zealand agriculture ever, but was not able to be fully exploited until the 1950s with the deployment of cobalt-ion-containing superphosphate fertiliser from aircraft.

== See also ==
- North Island Volcanic Plateau
