= Ngāti Maru–Ngati Tūwharetoa War =

1820s Māori conflict in New Zealand

Date	ca. 1822–1832
Location	Central North Island, New Zealand
Result	Ngāti Tūwharetoa victory Rise of Mananui Te Heuheu Tūkino II

Belligerents
Ngāti Maru; Ngāti Raukawa	Ngāti Tūwharetoa; Ngāti Tahu; Ngāti Tamaterā

Commanders and leaders
Patua †; Wahineiti †; Te Hau o Taranaki †; Tuterangianini; Te Whatanui; Te Ruamaioro; Te Arakai †; Te Wharemarumaru; Te Tioro; Hihitaua	Mananui Te Heuheu Tūkino II; Te Wharerangi †

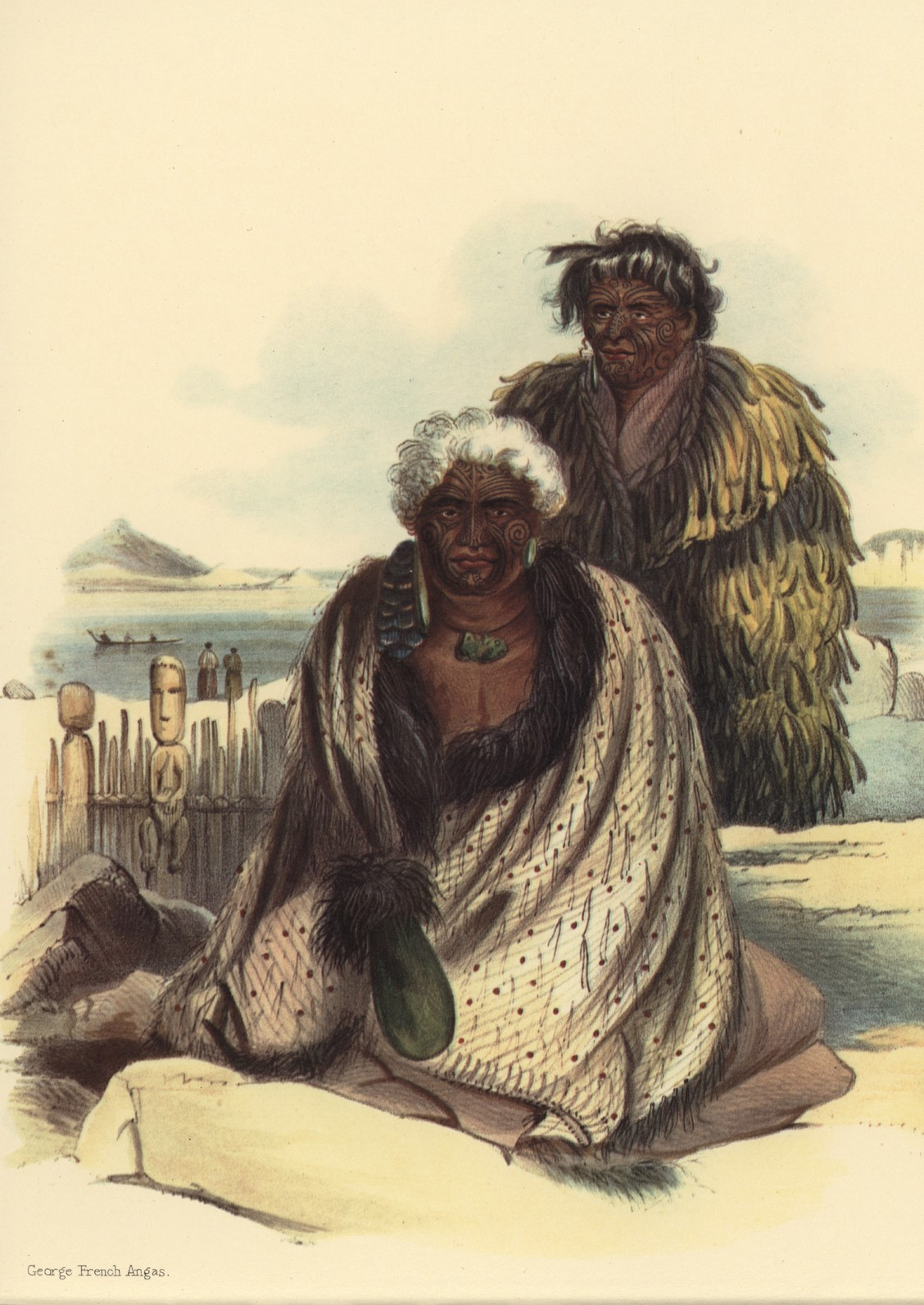
Mananui Te Heuheu Tūkino II (seated) and Iwikau Te Heuheu Tūkino III (standing). From George Angas, The New Zealanders Illustrated (1847).

The Ngati Maru–Ngati Tuwharetoa War (c. 1822–1832) was one of the conflicts between Māori tribes during the Musket Wars in New Zealand.

In the course of the conflict, the Ngāti Maru iwi invaded the rohe of Ngāti Tūwharetoa on four occasions. The first attack took place at some point after 1822, when a Ngāti Maru war party returning from the Cook Strait suddenly attacked Ngāti Tūwharetoa territories on the southeastern side of Lake Taupō. Under the leadership of Mananui Te Heuheu Tūkino II, Tūwharetoa pursued and destroyed this force. In revenge, Tuterangianini of Ngāti Maru led a successful invasion in late 1827 or early 1828, destroying several settlements. In December 1828, he attacked again, along with Ngāti Raukawa, and destroyed Motu-o-puhi pā. A final attack in January 1831, led by Ngāti Maru's paramount chief, Te Arakai, destroyed Piripekapeka, but was severely defeated by Te Heuheu in a battle at Pareaka. After this, peace was made.

The war had a transformative effect on Ngāti Tūwharetoa, leading them to make greater contact with European traders in order to acquire muskets and strengthening the position of paramount chief, hitherto a form of first among equals, into a strong, hereditary office.

== Background ==
In the early 19th century, northern Māori began to acquire European muskets from traders, leading to more intense and wide-ranging warfare than previously. In particular, Hongi Hika of Ngāpuhi led raids across the North Island. In turn, other tribes migrated and led raids elsewhere. Ngāti Maru at Hauraki were among the tribes that came under attack. They managed to acquire a few muskets and began to undertake long-distance expeditions of their own.

Ngāti Tūwharetoa had been settled around Lake Taupō since the sixteenth century. Because of their inland location they had little contact with Europeans in the early nineteenth century and had not acquired any muskets. The tribe was split into a number of hapū, which often came into conflict with one another, but they sometimes acknowledged a paramount chief with a limited degree of overarching authority in military matters. In the early nineteenth century, this position was claimed by Herea. When he died around 1820, the position was left vacant, but his son Te Heuheu Tūkino II began to seek the role.

== Course of the war ==
=== Desecration of Te Rangi-tua-mātotoru's grave ===
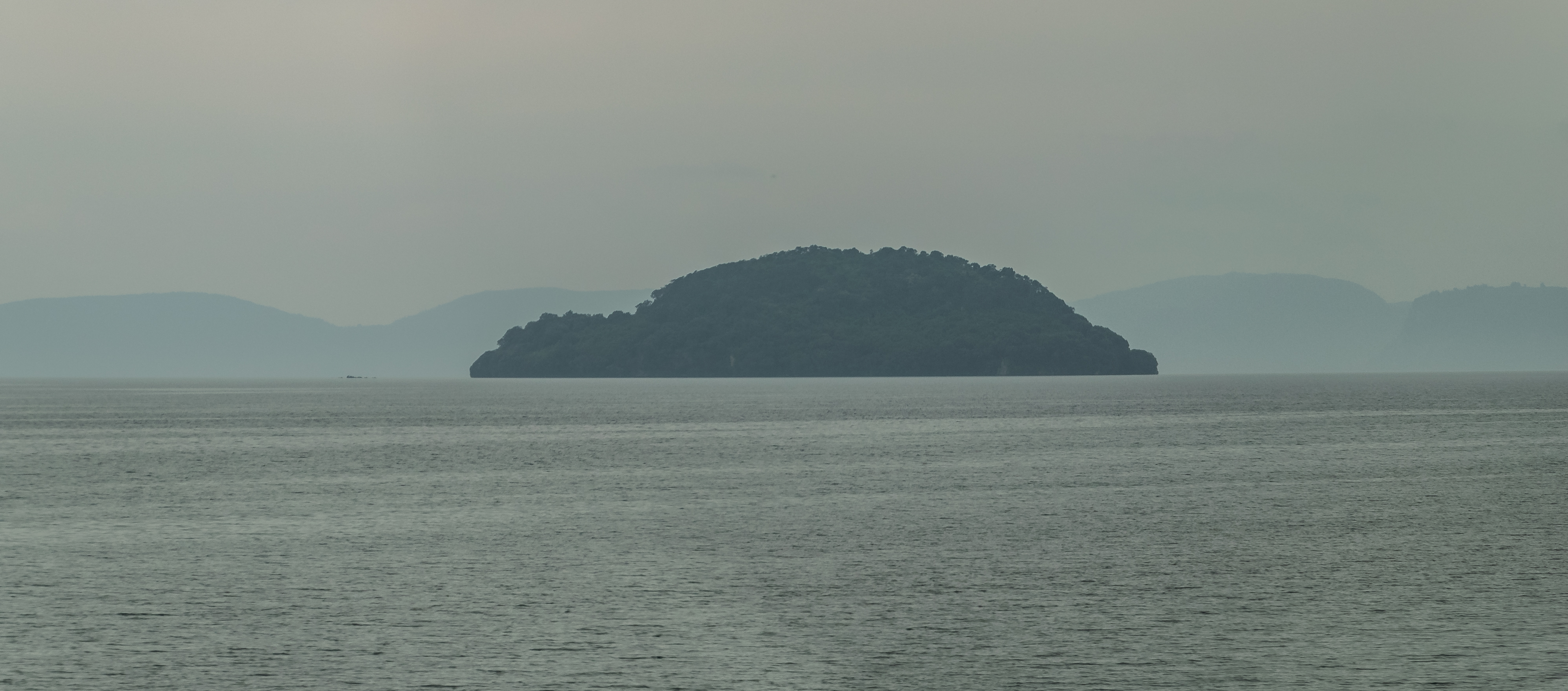
Motutaiko Island as seen from Tauranga Taupō.

Locations in the first Ngāti Maru attacks
1 Te Rapa
2 Marae-kōwhai (near Mokai)
3 Pūkawa
4 Motutaiko Island
5 Motutere
6 Omaunu on Rangatira Point
7 Whakatara

Sometime after 1822, three chiefs, Pataua, Te Hau o Taranaki, and Wahineiti led a war party of Ngāti Maru through the Taupō region on their way back from Te Rauparaha and Te Rangihaeata's attack on Kapiti. They visited Te Heuheu at Te Rapa and he lent them a number of canoes, including Whakaterekohukohu, to travel across the lake to Marae-kōwhai.

However, one of the chiefs in the war party had a vendetta with Ngāti Raukawa and convinced the war party to attack Ngāti Rua and Ngāti Hinemihi at Pūkawa, who had connections with Ngāti Raukawa. They desecrated the graves of the chiefs nearby, including those of Taipu and Takohe. Then they went to Motutaiko Island and desecrated the bones of Te Rangi-tua-mātotoru, who had been paramount chief before Herea. Then they attacked Motutere, stripping the local women naked and abusing them. One of the women at Motutere was Hurihia, Te Heuheu's sister, who escaped wearing only a fishing net to Te Rapa, where she informed her brother of what had happened.

The chiefs of Tūwharetoa gathered at Motutere to discuss how to respond to this attack. Some of them, notably Te Tauri said that no action should be taken, since the war party had violated tapu and were therefore doomed whatever happened. However, Te Heuheu strenuously pushed for Tūwharetoa to take action. Eventually, he got his way and a war party set out in pursuit of Ngāti Maru.

The Ngāti Maru force had made it to Omaunu on Rangatira Point at the northeastern corner of Lake Taupō, near the modern town of Taupō. The people of Omaunu had been forewarned of the force's bad intentions by Hape, a chieftain of the war party who was himself a member of Ngāti Raukawa and had defected after seeing the war party's behaviour at Pūkawa. The rangatira of Omaunu, Te Poihipi, greeted the war party as guests, advising them to tie up their canoes firmly and to camp outside the walls of the village, well aware that the war party was probably planning to attack them.

Overnight, Te Heuheu's war party made it to Omaunu and surrounded the Ngāti Maru. They attacked at dawn. In the fierce fighting that followed, Pataua, Te Hau o Taranaki, and Wahineiti were all killed. Hape fled to Maungatautari.

=== First attack on Whakatara ===
In late 1827, Tuterangianini led a large Ngāti Maru war party against Tūwharetoa. One motivation for the attack was getting vengeance (utu) for the deaths of Pataua, Te Hau o Taranaki, and Wahineiti. They may also have been probing the region to see whether they could wipe out Tūwharetoa and settle on their lands. However, the immediate cause was a request from Korokaihuhu, a rangatira of Tuhoe and Ngāti Warahoe, who wanted revenge for Tūwharetoa's massacre of Ngāti Warahoe after the Battle of Kohikete at the end of the Tūhoe–Ngāti Tūwharetoa War in the late eighteenth century. Korokaihuhu travelled to Ngāti Maru and successfully persuaded them to launch an expedition. The expedition had a single musket, which gave them a substantial advantage over Tūwharetoa, who had no such weapons.

The war party first attacked a fortress shared by Tūwharetoa and Ngāti Tahu in the Ātiamuri-Orakei Korako region. Moving south, they were confronted by Te Heuheu II at Pūkawa, but they were victorious. Te Heuheu was almost captured. From there, they continued south and destroyed the fortress of Whakatara Pā near the modern Waihi Village. After this, the war party returned to Hauraki.

=== Fall of Motu-o-puhi ===
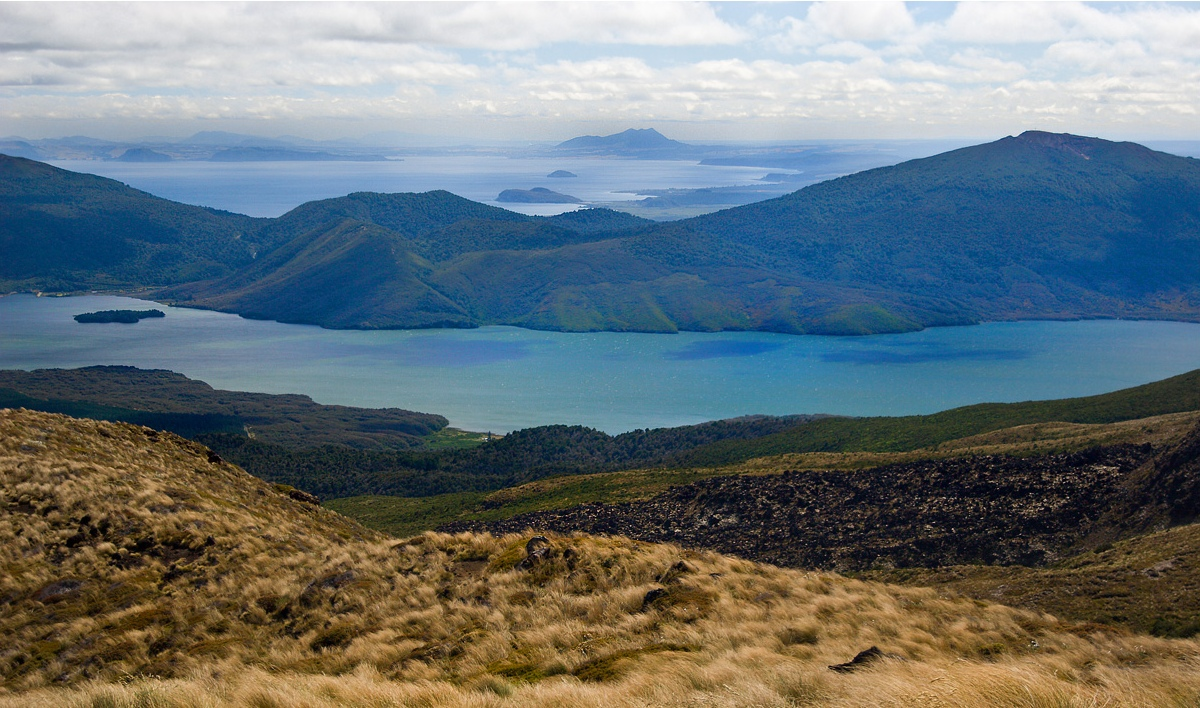
View looking down on Lake Rotoaira from the south. Motu-o-puhi island is at left and Lake Taupō is at the top of the picture.

Locations in the third Ngāti Maru attack
1 Waihāhā
2 Pūkawa
3 Te Rapa
4 Motu-o-puhi, Lake Rotoaira
5 Te Rae
6 Whareroa

In December 1828, Tuterangianini led another war party from Ngāti Maru to attack Ngāti Tūwharetoa. The success of the previous expedition led them to believe that they had a good chance of seizing territory and settling permanently. Tuterangianini joined up with a force of Ngāti Raukawa led by Te Ruamaioro, who were migrating towards the southern part of the North Island as a result of pressure from their neighbours. The expedition brought a single musket, the first gun to be brought into the Taupō region.

At Waihāhā, the expedition met the local hapū, Ngāti Te Kohera, who were related to Ngāti Raukawa. They guided the expedition to Pūkawa and then Ngāti Maru went on to Te Rapa, while Ngāti Raukawa took an inland route further to the west. Te Rapa was Te Heuheu's main base, but at this time it was empty because he had gathered all the southern and western Tūwharetoa at Waitahanui to the east to keep them safe from war parties. Therefore, Tuterangianini was able to occupy Te Rapa.

Te Heuheu led his men out to Te Rapa and the two forces presented themselves to one another and performed many haka. Finally, the Ngāti Maru force announced that it was on its way south and posed no threat to Tūwharetoa. To secure their passage through Tūwharetoa territory, Ngāti Maru agreed to hand over a number of women as hostages. Most of these hostages were female relatives of Te Whatanui, one of the Ngāti Maru rangatira: his daughter Te Rangingangana, his niece Rangipoutahi, and his wife Rauoterangi. Two other chieftainesses of Ngāti Maru, Hapai and Pito, were also handed over.

The Ngāti Maru expedition then continued south over the Poutu saddle to Lake Rotoaira, where they rendezvoused with the Ngāti Raukawa force on the western shore at Kotukutuku. The local rangatira, Te Wharerangi, was based at Motu-o-puhi, a fortified village on an island at the northeastern end of Lake Rotoaira. It was home to the Tūwharetoa hapū of Ngāti Hikairo ki Tongariro, Ngāti Waewae, Ngāti Wi, and Ngāti Tama. Since they were now safely out of Te Heuheu's immediate domain, Ngāti Maru decided to attack Motu-o-puhi in order to get revenge for the earlier deaths of members of Ngāti Maru. Ngāti Raukawa agreed to join the attack, because Te Wharerangi had killed some of their chiefs when they were fleeing from a defeat at Mangatoa on the Manawatū River in 1821.

Ngāti Maru made an alliance with the local people of the western shore of the lake, sealed by the marriage of the local woman, Hinehoro, to Te Awhi of Ngāti Maru. They then secretly gathered as many canoes as they could. According to the descendants of Te Wharerangi, the canoes were secretly delivered by one of the local rangatira, Te Huiatahi, who belonged to the Ngāti Waewae hapū of Tūwharetoa and was hostile to Te Wharerangi. Ngāti Waewae tradition strongly denies this. Some descendants of Te Wharerangi also claim that Te Heuheu had told Ngāti Maru about the weaknesses of Motu-o-puhi's fortifications, because Te Wharerangi had refused to let Te Heuheu marry his daughter. Once Ngāti Maru had enough canoes, they set out at dawn, attacked Motu-o-puhi from the water, and easily seized the village, thanks especially to their gun. Ngāti Maru lost two chiefs, Te kauauau and Taitanguru, while Pahupahu was killed on the Motu-o-puhi side. Many of the inhabitants of Motu-o-puhi were killed, but Te Wharerangi's brother Hokopakeke Te Huri managed to get many of the women and children, including Te Wharerangi's wife, Te Rangikoaea, his young son, Matuāhu Nini, and his daughter Te Māri, to the Manganuioteao River, where their Ngāti Uenuku relatives lived.

The captured chieftains were lined up and executed one by one with a greenstone patu. As it came to his turn, Te Wharerangi attempted to escape, leaping off a nearby clifftop into the lake, but he was caught and killed by some of the Ngāti Maru who were in canoes nearby. Another chieftain, Hikopo tried the same thing and was also killed, but his body was only found later by Te Heuheu, washed up on the shore, with the treasured pounamu pendant, Kaukaumatua, still around his neck.

Two scouts from Ngāti Te Aho sent out by Te Heuheu saw the burning of Motu-o-puhiand quickly reported the attack to Te Heuheu. With a war-party of Ngāti Te Aho, Ngāti Hinewai, and Ngāti Turumakina, Te Heuheu rushed to Lake Rotoaira. Te Heuheu's brother Iwikau called for an immediate attack, but Te Heuheu refused, because of his regard for Te Whatanui. He also refused to execute the hostages, even though this had been demanded by a number of prominent chiefs: Te Puhi, Paewhenua, Te Rangikaiamokura, Te Rangimonehunehu, and Tauteka. He argued that the female hostages were insufficiently important for their deaths to compensate for the murder of Te Wharerangi. Therefore, Te Heuheu returned home without doing anything.

After the fall of Motu-o-puhi, most of Ngāti Raukawa continued their journey south under Te Ruamaioro. When they reached Onepoto, on the Whanganui River, they were attacked by Pēhi Turoa, one of Te Wharerangi's relatives. They were defeated, retreated to Makatoke, and were defeated again. Te Ruamaioro was killed, while Tupaea, Te Puke, Te Ao, and Wharemakotea were taken prisoner.

Meanwhile, the Ngāti Maru force turned back towards Hauraki, accompanied by the section of Ngāti Raukawa led by Te Whatanui. They were confronted by a war party led by Iwikau at Te Rae, who informed Te Whatanui that his female relatives had not been killed. They continued by canoe to Whareroa, where a large war party under Te Heuheu appeared on the shore. Instead of attacking, Te Heuheu agreed to return the hostages to Te Whatanui, in exchange for Te Rangikoaea, the wife of Te Wharerangi, who had been captured at Motu-o-puhi. Te Heuheu's generosity on this occasion formed the basis of an alliance with Te Whatanui, which continued for the rest of their lives. Then Ngāti Maru returned home.

=== Second attack on Whakatara ===
In late 1829 or early 1830, Ngāti Maru invaded Tūwharetoa once more and attacked the village of Whakatara once more. The village was defended by Te Heuheu, Te Rakato, Te Riupawhara and Kauwai. Ngāti Maru had again brought their gun and they shot Kauwai dead when he came out of the fortress early on.

During the siege, one of the Ngāti Maru chiefs took to mocking Te Riupawhara for his spear-dart. He came up to the wall and mooned him (whakapohane), saying "here is the house of the spear of Te Riupawhara!" Riupawhara threw his spear, which had a deadly kāpara (resinous wood) tip, at the target and killed him. Shortly afterwards, Te Riupawhara secretly met one of the Ngāti Maru chiefs who was a relative of his in the night. He convinced the relative to steal the gun from its owner, a particularly heavy sleeper, and hand it over to him. Te Riupawhara named his new weapon Te Hāware ("The Spittle"). In the morning, when the theft was discovered, Ngāti Maru abandoned the attack and returned to Hauraki.

=== Final expedition and Battle of Pareaka ===
Locations in the final Ngāti Maru attacks
1 Motutaiko Island
2 Piripekapeka
3 Nukuhau
4 Lake Rotongaio
5 Motutere
6 Waitetoko
7 Tokaanu
8 Lake Rotoaira

The success of the previous raids had convinced Ngāti Maru that they could completely destroy Ngāti Tūwharetoa, so they launched another expedition in January 1831. This was led by the paramount chief of Ngāti Maru, Te Arakai, along with Te Wharemarumaru and Te Tioro. They were joined by a force from their neighbours, Ngāti Tamaterā, led by Hihitaua, along with Rangitaiki, Te Wiwini o Rongo, and Te Whareaunga. The force was armed with a number of guns.

In the meanwhile, Te Heuheu and his men went to Maketu in the Bay of Plenty, with a large amount of flax, which they sold to a local trader, Phillip Tapsell, for guns and bullets, so that they would no longer by outgunned by attackers from the coasts. In expectation of another attack, Te Heuheu gathered all the hapū of Ngāti Tūwharetoa who were under his sway on Motutaiko Island: Ngāti Te Rangiita, Ngāti Manunui, Ngāti Te Aho, Ngāti Hinewai, Ngāti Hukere, Ngāti Tūrū-makina, and Ngāti Tutemohuta.

Te Arakai led his force south and attacked the Ngāti Parekawa pā of Piripekapeka on the western shore of Lake Taupō. The location of this settlement on a high cliff meant that it could not be taken by force. Therefore, Hihitaua contacted his relatives within the village, saying that he wanted to make peace. When the Ngāti Parekawa chiefs came down to discuss terms, Te Arakai ambushed them. Many were killed and the rest were taken captive and transported to Nukuhau. The event is traditionally compared to "birds caught in a snare by a cunning hunter." One of the Ngāti Maru warriors, Kokopu, who was closely related to Ngāti Parekawa, attempted to warn them of the ambush by playing a tune on his flute, but they did not get the message. He later wrote a waiata for the victims, which is preserved by John Te Herekiekie Grace and by Āpirana Ngata, which opens:

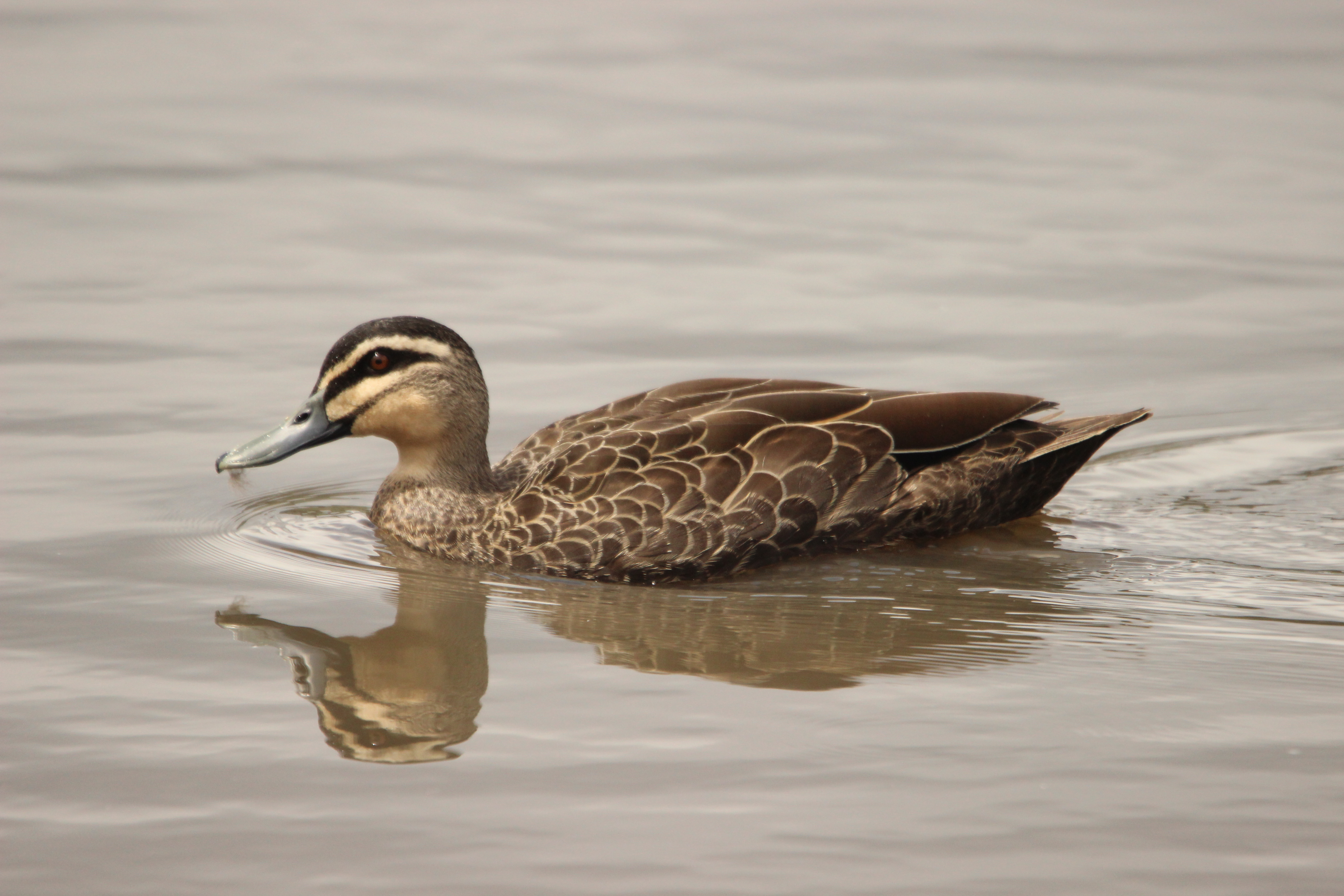
Pārera duck

Noho noa Meremere, kaua i te tāngata
Nana te tohe, nana te maro,
Rere ke mai nei he pārera noho noa
A Ruamaroro

— Kokopu
Translation:

Danger you heeded not, O Meremere,
And no one among you resisted deception –
Thus you became like ducks settling down
On the snares of Ruamaroro the hunter...

— Grace 1970, pp. 267–269

The Ngāti Maru force travelled on to Lake Rotongaio, where they attacked a village of Ngāti Tahu and Ngāti Kurapoto, killing one chief and leaving his head on a rock. They travelled on to Motutere, where Ngāti Maru killed and ate the Ngāti Parekawa prisoners.

Te Rangipuawhe and his wife Tuitui of Tūhourangi had been visiting Te Heuheu on Motutaiko island. As they made their way home to Lake Tarawera, they sighted the head of the dead chief at Lake Rotongaio, realised that Ngāti Maru must have attacked, and returned to Motutaiko to inform Te Heuheu. When he heard about this, Te Heuheu set out with a fleet of canoes, intending to eliminate the attackers. He sent an embassy to Motutere offering safe passage to three chiefs who were related to him (Te Tioro, Te Wharemarumaru, and Rimakaho), but this was declined.

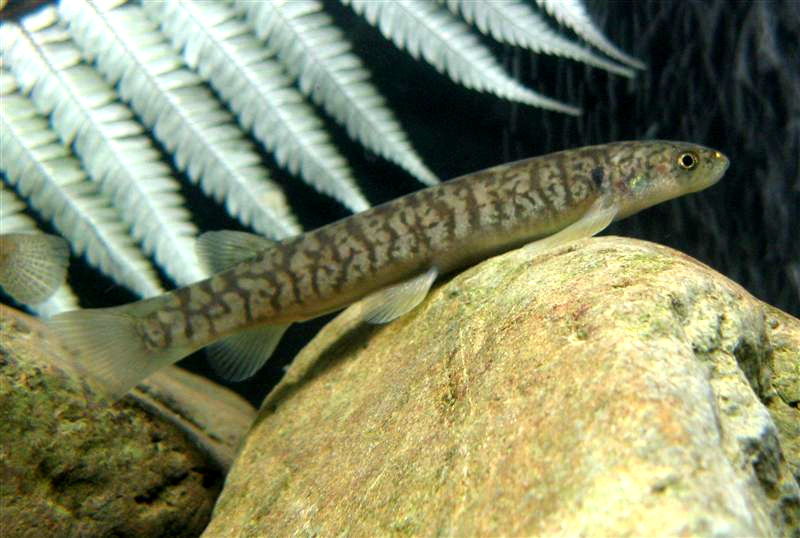
Juvenile kōaro

Ngāti Maru now moved south along the shore towards Tokaanu and Ngāti Tūwharetoa followed them in their canoes. Near Waitetoko, two Ngāti Maru soldiers came down to the beach and Te Riupawhara shot both of them dead with Te Hāware. Te Heuheu now sailed back to Motutaiko and then on to Pūkawa, where he went ashore and marched to Tokaanu. The tohunga Pahau caused Tūwharetoa's atua, Rongomai, to appear in the sky as a shooting star, which crashed to earth in the direction of Lake Rotongaio, indicating that Ngāti Maru had gone in that direction. Te Heuheu set out in pursuit. At Waione, he sighted a canoe and the man in it shouted an insult, "O Te Wharerangi, give me some kōaro!" This indicated to Te Heuheu that the Ngāti Maru force was at Pareaka.

Te Heuheu now prepared for battle, dividing up the front line among all of the hapū that were present, instead of giving it exclusively to his own tribe. He called this arrangement "whakauruuru" ("integration") and said it was done "Kia kai tahi ai te umu tapu" ("so that we may all share in the sacred oven"). The sacred oven was where the first defeated enemy was cooked and signified the honour of the first kill in a battle, so by this Te Heuheu meant that he wanted to share the honour of victory equally among all the tribes of Tūwharetoa.

However, as Te Heuheu was arranging his men, some of his allies from Ngāti Te Kohera, who had decided to support Ngāti Maru, fired their guns. Since the force's presence had now been revealed to Ngāti Maru, Te Heuheu gave the order to attack immediately. Iwikau made the first kill, a warrior called Ngakengake of Ngāti Korokī, and Paewhenua made the second. Te Heuheu's cousin, Te Popo killed Huruhururere. Te Rangikaiamokura killed Te Wharemarumaru, and then the general mêlée broke out. The Ngāti Maru chieftains, Te Hoariri, Te Tioro, and Te Kanaia were killed. Ngāti Maru turned and fled.

Hoata Te Hata says that Te Arakai was killed in the battle too, but according to John Te Herekiekie Grace, he survived to join the retreat and was found by Te Poinga a Toki at Te Ngongo, near the wharenui Te Tohe a Puku, and killed. His preserved hand was given to Matuahu. to use as a food holder. His descendants kept it until the 1880s. Over a hundred warriors were executed and their body parts were sent all around the Lake. One of the prisoners, Toia son of Kukutai called out to Te Heuheu for mercy and was saved when he and his siblings leapt on top of him, shielding him from the executioner with their own bodies.

The Ngāti Te Kohera force fled from the battle, stopping only to steal the clothes of Te Heuheu's men, which had been left by the Waione Stream before the battle. Te Popo chased after them and forced them to return the clothes. The Ngāti Maru survivors fled along the Puketi and Puketapu tracks to Maungatautari, led by Te Arakai's son.

=== Peace agreement ===
In 1832, Ngāti Maru convinced Te Hera to lead a war party from Waikato to Lake Taupō, in order to avenge the defeated expedition, but, when they arrived, Te Hera made peace with Tūwharetoa and then went home. At a later point, Te Heuheu went to Hauraki and concluded a peace agreement with Taraia, the new paramount chief of Ngāti Maru.

The war firmly and definitively solidified Te Heuheu's position as the paramount chief of Ngāti Tūwharetoa. The position has remained in his family ever since.

== Sources ==
The Ngāti Tūwharetoa account of the war was recorded by Lawrence Marshall Grace in 1881 by Morunga, the wife of Iwikau, who was present during the conflict as a young lady. An account by Hoata Te Hata, based on oral accounts from several participants in the conflict, including Te Rakatō, Hona Hepe, Haimona, and Hakaraia Te Wheo, was published in the Journal of the Polynesia Society in 1918. These two accounts formed the basis for John Te Herekiekie Grace's account in his 1959 history of Ngāti Tūwharetoa.

Ngāti Maru and Ngāti Raukawa have their own traditions about the conflict.

== Bibliography ==
- Crosby, Ron (2020). The Forgotten Wars: Why the Musket Wars Matter Today. Auckland [NZ]: Oratia. ISBN 9780947506834.
- Downes, T. W. (1915). Old Whanganui. Hawera [NZ]: W. A. Parkinson.
- Grace, John Te Herekiekie (1970) [1959]. Tuwharetoa: The History of the Maori People of the Taupo District. Auckland [NZ]: A.H. & A.W. Reed. ASIN B0007JE64K. ISBN 9780589003739.
- Hura, Elizabeth (2007). Dictionary of New Zealand Biography - Mananui Te Heuheu Tukino II. Ministry for Culture and Heritage.
- Ngata, Apriana; Jones, Pei Te Hurinui (2004). Nga Moteatea: He Maramara Rere no nga Waka Maha, Part I. Auckland [NZ]: Auckland University Press.
- Te Hata, Hoeta; Fletcher, H. J. (1918). "Ngati-Tuhare-toa occupation of Taupo-nui-a-tia". Journal of the Polynesian Society. 27: 38–46.
- Waitangi Tribunal (2013). Te Kāhui Maunga: The National Park District Inquiry Report (Wai 1130) (PDF). Vol. 1. Lower Hutt [NZ]: Legislation Direct. ISBN 9781869563059.
