= Tūhoe–Ngāti Tūwharetoa War =

18th-century war in New Zealand

Date	18th century
Location	Pākā Bay, Lake Taupō, New Zealand
Result	Enduring peace established

Belligerents
Tūhoe; Ngāti Warahoe	Ngāti Tūwharetoa

Commanders and leaders
Te Uhia; Te Umuariki; Te Purewa; Korokī; Te Wharekotua; Poutū; Taiturakina; Te Pana; Tuiringa	Taihakoa; Tutakaroa; Te Kiore; Te Rangikaiamokura; Tauteka; Te Rangi-tua-mātotoru; Herea Te Heuheu Tukino I

The Tūhoe–Ngāti Tūwharetoa War was a conflict that took place on the eastern shore of Lake Taupō in the central North Island of New Zealand in the mid- to late eighteenth century, between the Tūhoe iwi of Te Urewera and the Ngāti Tūwharetoa iwi of Lake Taupō.

The war was sparked by "the seen face of Taihakoa in Ruatahuna", an incident in which a Tūwharetoa rangatira intervened in a conflict between Tūhoe and Ngāti Whare. Tūhoe responded with a large-scale invasion of the eastern shore of Lake Taupō, in which they captured a number of Tūwharetoa settlements at Pākā Bay. A Ngāti Tūwharetoa counter-attack was defeated at the Battle of Orona with large casualties. After this, the elderly paramount chief of Tūwharetoa, Te Rangi-tua-mātotoru, who had remained aloof from the conflict, negotiated a peace which was confirmed at Ōpepe shortly thereafter.

In the aftermath of the war, Ngāti Tūwharetoa joined up with Ngāti Maniapoto and wiped out a group of Ngāti Warahoe, who had been allowed to settle on Tūwharetoa land at the south end of Taupō, in the Battle of Kohikete, after it was discovered that the Warahoe had joined Tūhoe in eating the Tūwharetoa casualties from Orona. The war played an important role in the rise of Herea Te Heuheu Tukino I to the paramount chieftainship of Ngāti Tūwharetoa, a position still held by his descendants today.

== The seen face of Taihakoa in Ruatahuna ==
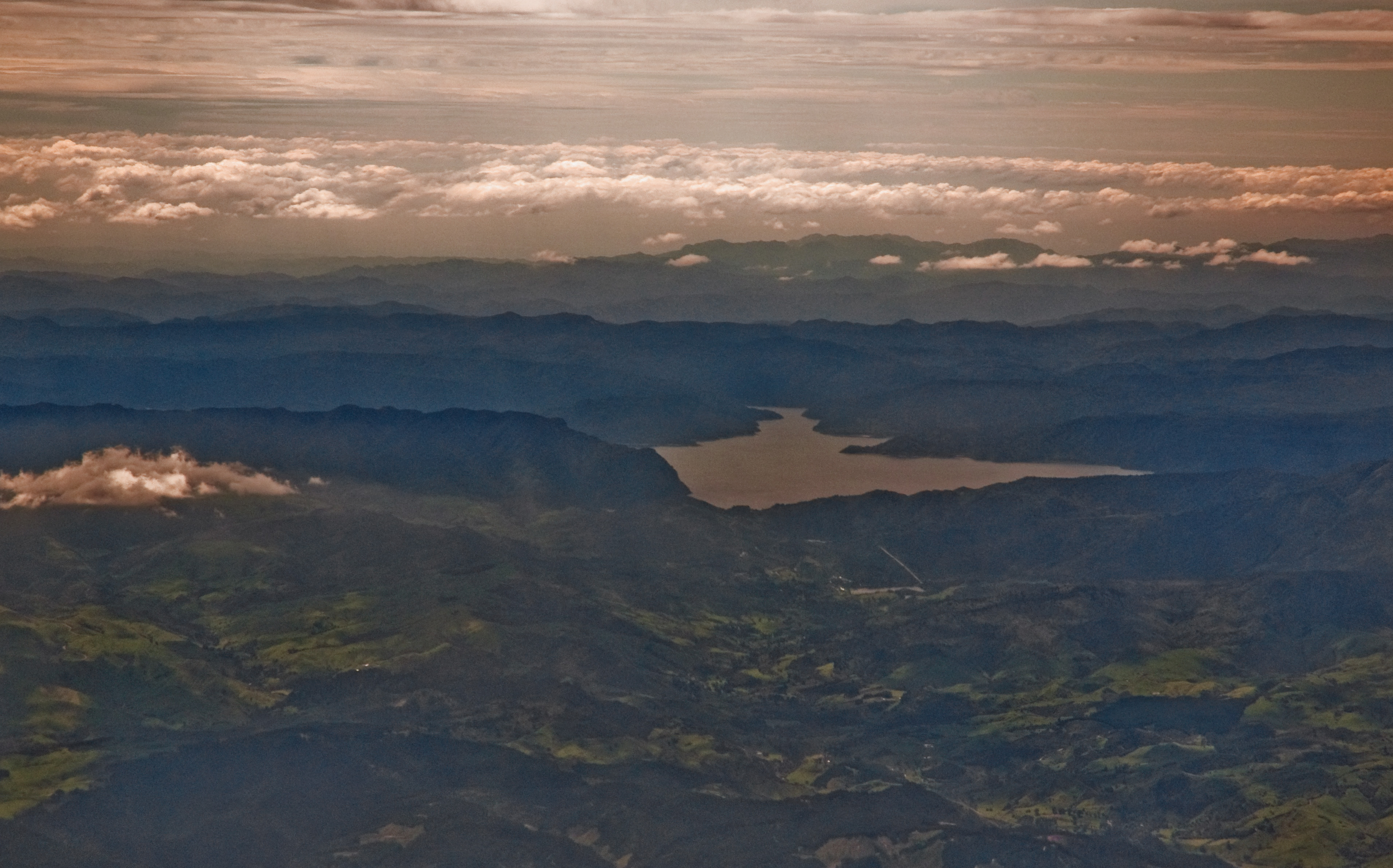
Lake Waikaremoana in Te Urewera

Two rangatira from Tūhoe, Te Wini and Tapuwae, attacked Ngāti Hineuru, a hapū based at Tarawera which had links to both Ngāti Kahungunu and Ngāti Tūwharetoa. Te Wini was wounded and stopped on the return journey at Te Whaiti, where the local hapū, Ngāti Whare looked after him. However, the people of Tūhoe thought that he had been killed and launched an attack on Ngāti Whare to avenge him. This resulted in the death of Hinetatu, a high-ranking Ngāti Whare woman. Te Raiti, rangatira of Ngāti Whare began gathering a force to take revenge on Tūhoe in turn and they called on Te Arawa, Ngāti Manawa, and Ngāti Tūwharetoa to help them. The Ngāti Rua hapū of Tūwharetoa answered this call, sending a contingent led by Taihakoa.

The combined war party marched out from Te Whaiti and attacked Te Kauae, a village of the Ngāti Te Riu hapū of Tūhoe. Then they made camp for the night at Heipipi. Tūhoe quickly gathered a force and attacked them, chasing them to Arikirau, where they fought a day-long battle, from which Tūhoe emerged victorious. Taihakoa and another important Tūwharetoa chieftain, Te Wahitapu, fought hard, but were killed.

When the Tūhoe realised that Taihakoa was from Tūwharetoa, they were very angry, since the conflict had nothing to do with Tūwharetoa. They considered Taihakoa guilty of te kanohi kitea (‘the seen face’), which was when a rangatira appeared armed in a region where they had no right to be, which was regarded as an insult to the mana of the local tribe. This incident became known as te kanohi kitea o Taihakoa i roto o Ruatahuna (‘the seen face of Taihakoa in Ruatahuna’).

== Course of the War ==
Places in the Tūhoe–Ngāti Tūwharetoa War
1 Arikirau
2 Motutere
3 Korohe Stream
4 Hinemaiaia Stream
5 Orona, Pākā Bay
6 Ōpepe
7 Te Rapa

=== Prophecy of Te Uhia ===
The rangatira of Tūhoe called on Te Uhia of the Ngāti Tamakaimoana hapū, their most important rangatira and tohunga to consult the tribal atua, Te Rehu o Tainui and find out whether they could avenge the insult. Te Uhia gathered the people and told them that he had dreamed of a chief called Te Kiore wearing a red cloak and riding in a canoe called Hiahia. He said that any attack by Tūhoe on Tūwharetoa would fail unless Tūhoe first found Hiahia and killed Te Kiore. The assembled chiefs then agreed to attack Tūwharetoa.

=== Te Wharangi and Te Akaurangi’s journey ===
In the meanwhile, two Tūhoe tohunga, Te Wharangi and Te Akaurangi, who were related to the Ngāti Te Aho hapū of Tūwharetoa, travelled to Taupō. They visited Operua, home of Taihakoa's Ngāti Rua hapū, where they were treated poorly as revenge for Taihakoa's death. Then they went to Motutere, home of Tūwharetoa's paramount chief, [[]], and warned him that Tūhoe was going to invade and that he should not participate in the conflict. Te Wharangi and Te Akaurangi met with the tohunga Te Irihau at the Korohe Stream and performed incantations with him to protect Tūwharetoa at the sacred place where part of the tauiho (carvings at the bow) from the Tōtara-i-kāria canoe, in which the Tūwharetoa ancestor, Ngātoro-i-rangi, had sailed to and from Hawaiki, was kept. Again they called on the local people not to take part in the coming war. They repeated this message to Te Rangikaiamokura at Whakaohokau near Tokaanu.

=== Tūhoe Invasion ===
The next spring they gathered a war party of four hundred men, led by Te Uhia, Te Umuariki, Te Purewa, Korokī, Te Wharekotua, Poutū, Taiturakina, Te Pana, and Tuiringa. The force arrived at Lake Taupō and headed south along the eastern shore of the lake to the Hinemaiaia Stream, where they attacked four fortified villages of Ngāti Rua, Te Totara, Operua, Ngamokai, and Urukapua. Ngāti Rua were taken by surprise and many of them were away, so the villages were quickly captured. The survivors fled across the lake, spreading the news of the Tūhoe invasion and the hapū of Tūwharetoa all began to raise war parties. Meanwhile, the Tūhoe made their base at Orona in Pākā Bay.

The Tūhoe hapū of Ngāti Tamakaimoana had installed themselves in Urukapua. One of the Tūwharetoa chieftains, Tawhakamoe snuck into the fortress in the middle of the night and assassinated the nightwatchman. Then he struck the pahu (gong struck regularly by the sentry during the night) in a particular way, so that his allies knew that it was safe for them to sneak into the fortress as well. They snuck in and massacred the Tamakaimoana in the early morning.

=== Battle of Orona ===
In light of Te Wharangi and Te Akaurangi's message, many members of Ngāti Te Aho did not join the war against Tūhoe, but others did, including Tutakaroa, Te Rangikaiamokura, Te Kiore, and Tauteka. The Tūwharetoa forces converged on Orona. For two days there was no action, as Tūwharetoa waited for the rest of their reinforcements and the Tūhoe remembered Te Uiha's prophecy that they should not attack until they had seen the canoe Hiahia and killed the red-cloaked chieftain Te Kiore. At last, they sighted Te Kiore and then they performed a haka beginning ko wai te waka e? (“What is the canoe, e?”), which is still performed, and charged forward. Te Panaiwaho grabbed Te Kiore and Te Rangikaiamokura, dragged them ashore and killed them. In the ensuing battle, Tūhoe were victorious and the Tūwharetoa chieftains, Tuhaha and Tutakaroa, were killed. The Tūhoe cooked the prisoners with pumice stones (an insult) and ate them. It was said that “A few of Tūhoe and the Underworld shall laugh!” which became proverbial. The survivors fled to Te Rangi-tua-mātotoru's village, Motutere. There they met Herea who had been leading some reinforcements to join the fight against Tūhoe and he began preparing the Motutere for a siege.

Tera te kotuhi auahi ana, a waiata tangi (song of lament) for Te Kiore by Rangimanewanewa, remains well-known and is still often sung at Māori funerals. It is included in Āpirana Ngata’s collection of Māori songs, Nga Mōteata (no. 34).

=== Peace between Tūwharetoa and Tūhoe ===
Following the Tūwharetoa defeat at Orana, the elderly Te Rangi-tua-mātotoru took his canoe to Pākā Bay and shouted to the Tūhoe soldiers to let him speak to Te Purewa. After inquiring as to whether his grandson, Te Hinganui had been killed (he had), he landed and asked to make peace. The Tūhoe and Tūwharetoa forces then met at Ōpepe, where they agreed to end the war. The tatau pounamu (greenstone door, i.e. a state of enduring peace) was confirmed by Te Rangituamatotoru on behalf of Tūwharetoa, and Te Umuariki and Koroki on behalf of Tūhoe. Then Tūhoe returned to Te Urewera, promising never to attack the Taupō region again.

== Aftermath ==
=== Battle of Kohikete ===
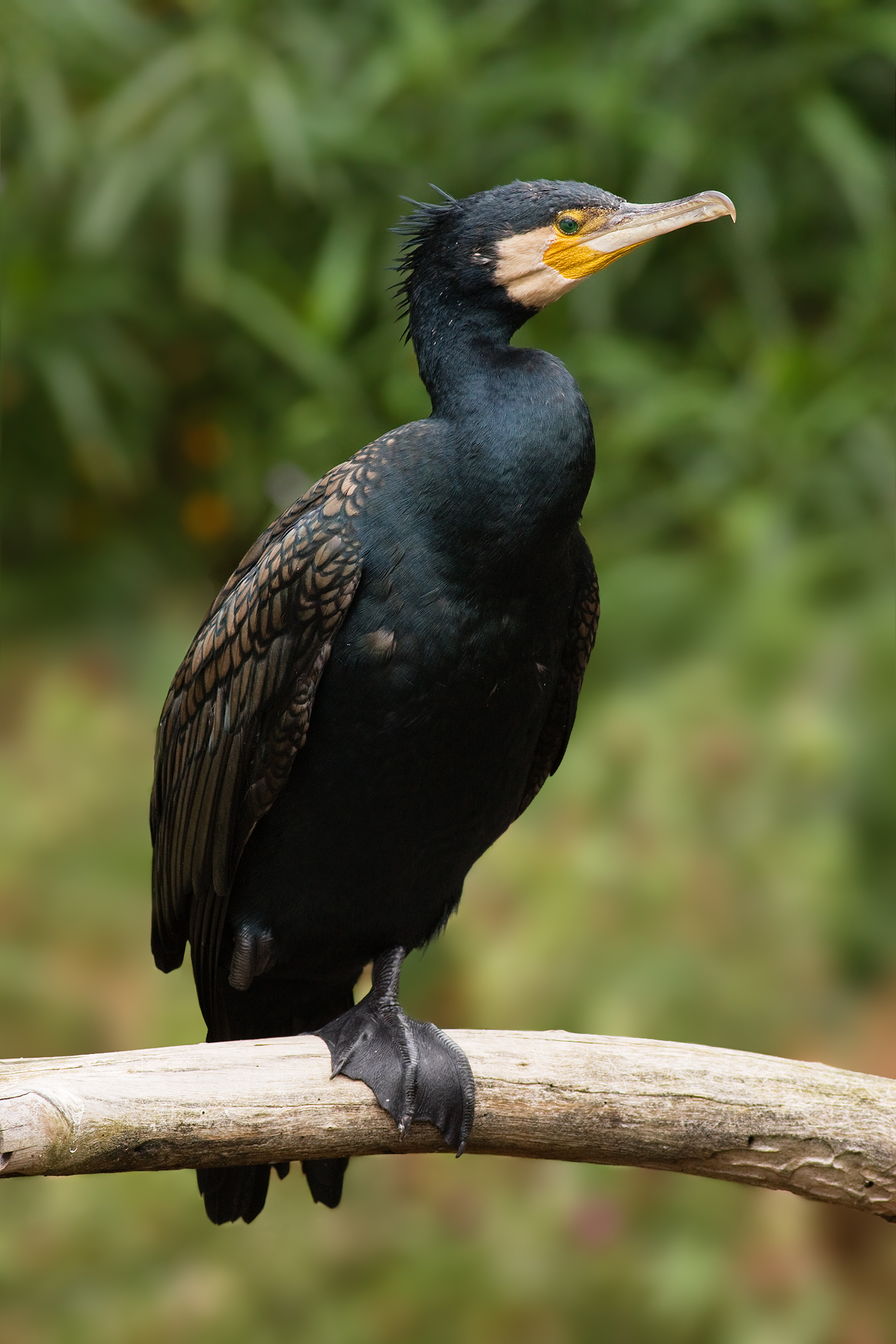
Kawau (black shag).

News of the Battle of Orana came to Te Mahuhuki, a rangatira of the Ngāti Warahoe, which had been driven out of the Rangitaiki by Ngāti Awa and had been allowed by Tūwharetoa to settle at Te Rapa and Whakatara near Waihi. In the meantime, Te Mahuhuki had quarrelled with some parts of Tūwharetoa, so he led his people to the scene of the battle, ostensibly in order to hunt kawau (black shags), but actually to congratulate Tūhoe and to join them in eating the Tūwharetoa who had been defeated in the battle. They brought some of the bodies back with them to Te Rapa in order to eat later.

Two young women of Tūwharetoa were romantically involved with two Ngāti Warahoe men and regularly met them near Te Rapa. One of the women noticed that one of the men had strange-smelling breath and when she described it to her relatives, they realised it was the smell of human flesh. Spies followed the Ngāti Warahoe men and found the storehouse containing human remains, including the tattooed arm of Te Rangikaimokura.

Unable to attack the Ngāti Warahoe on their own because of the number of men that they had lost at Orana, they called on Pēhi Tūkōrehu of Ngāti Maniapoto to come from the Waikato to help them. Together, they attacked and defeated Ngāti Warahoe. Ngāti Maniapoto took their portion of the prisoners back to Waikato, while the Ngāti Tūwharetoa prisoners were executed by sewing them up in baskets while still alive. As a result, the battle came to be known as Kohikete (‘sewn up in baskets’). One Ngāti Warahoe woman committed suicide after composing a waiata that is still preserved, which mourns the defeat and the death of her daughter. It opens “my discomfort, my misfortune, and my grief are such that I weep alone…”

== Bibliography ==
- Grace, John Te Herekiekie (1959). Tuwharetoa: The history of the Maori people of the Taupo District. Auckland [N.Z.]: A.H. & A.W. Reed.
- Ngata, Apriana; Jones, Pei Te Hurinui (2004). Nga Moteatea: he maramara rere no nga waka maha, Part I. Auckland [N.Z.]: Auckland University Press.
