= Te Rangi-tua-mātotoru =

Māori rangatira and tohunga

- Ariki (Paramount Chief) of Ngāti Tūwharetoa; Rangatira / Ariki of Ngāti Te Rangiita; Tohunga
- Predecessor: Meremere
- Successor: Te Rangihirawea (as Rangatira); Te Heuheu Tūkino I (as Ariki); Te Wakaiti (Briefly Ariki)
- Known for: Tribal leadership, building wharenui, war commander
- Residence: Hautū-te-rangi; Te Ririkawareware; Haruru-o-te-rangi
- Locality: Motutere, Taupō Region
- Wars and battles: Tūhoe-Tūwharetoa War; Ngāti Te Aho War
- Issue: Te Rangihirawea; Pipiri
- Father: Meremere

Te Rangi-tua-mātotoru was an 18th-century Māori rangatira and tohunga of the Ngāti Te Rangiita hapū and ariki (paramount chieftain) of the Ngāti Tūwharetoa iwi of the region around Lake Taupō, New Zealand. He built three great wharenui (meeting houses) for different sections of Ngāti Tūwharetoa. When the Tūwharetoa chieftain Tutakaroa attacked Te Rangi-tua-mātotoru’s allies in Ngāti Tahu, he summoned allies from Te Arawa to attack Tutakaroa at Whakaohokau, but had second thoughts about the venture and arranged a peace before Te Arawa could wreak havoc. He sent a force to help Te Uamairangi from the Ngāti Te Upokoiri hapū of Ngāti Kahungunu escape to Whakatane after he was defeated in a bid for control of Ngāti Kahungunu. In his old age, he negotiated the peace which ended the Tūhoe-Ngāti Tūwharetoa War. After his death, he was eventually succeeded by Herea Te Heuheu Tukino I.

He played an important role in Ngāti Tūwharetoa as the model for subsequent paramount chiefs. Te Heuheu II called him “the man who understood good and evil” or “had the power of life and death.” John Te Herekiekie Grace reports that “during the occupation of Taupo by Ngati Tuwharetoa no other chief equalled him in mana or prestige.” A Waitangi Tribunal report of 2013 judges that he "set the high standard of leadership that would be associated with the role of paramount chief."

== Life ==
Te Rangi-tua-mātotoru was the oldest son of Meremere, the paramount chief of Ngāti Tūwharetoa, who died at Lake Rotoiti, during a visit to Te Arawa. Through his father, he was the great-grandson of Tamamutu and a direct descendant of Tūwharetoa i te Aupōuri. Te Rangi-tua-mātotoru made his base at Motutere on the southeastern shore of Lake Taupō.

=== Building wharenui ===
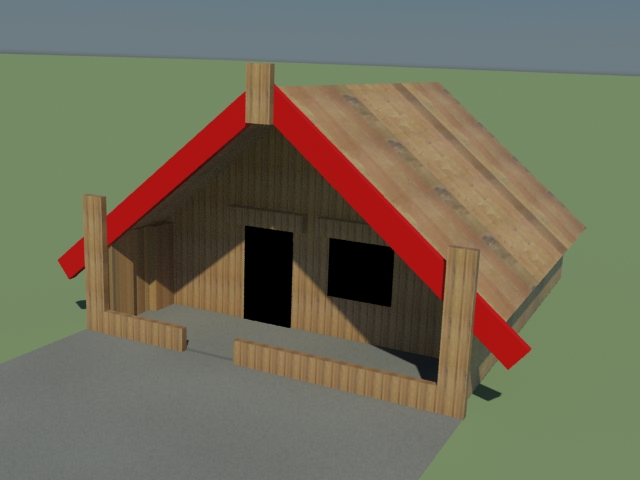
A schematic diagram of a wharenui.

Before Te Rangi-tua-mātotoru became ariki, he had built two great wharenui for different sections of his tribe. The first was called Hautū-te-rangi and was located at his own village of Motutere. The second was Te Ririkawareware, located at Tokaanu. The carvings of these houses were produced by a famous rangatira, Hopara, with a pounamu chisel called Hauhau-pounamu.

After Te Rangi-tua-mātotoru became ariki, the portion of the tribe living around Lake Rotoaira composed a song calling for the construction of a house for themselves. This song is preserved by John Te Herekiekie Grace and opens, “Alas! We have as yet no house and I feel a pain throbbing as if to break my heart.” In response, Te Rangi-tua-mātotoru built a large wharenui at Heretoa on the southwest edge of Lake Rotoaira, which was named Haruru-o-te-rangi after the spot on Mount Tongariro where Takaka and Te Ririao, two of the tribe’s atua reside.

=== War with Ngāti Te Aho ===
Places in the life of Te Rangi-tua-matotoru
1 Motutere
2 Tokaanu
3 Heretoa, Lake Rotoaira
4 Ohaaki
5 Titiokura Saddle
6 Orona, Pākā Bay
7 Ōpepe
8 Motutaiko Island

A chieftain called Kereua of Ngāti Awa, Ngāti Maru, and Ngāti Tūwharetoa came from the Bay of Plenty to visit relatives at Tokaanu and Te Rangi-tua-mātotoru at Motutere. On his way home he killed an old Ngāti Tahu chieftain at Tapapakuao in revenge for some earlier conflict. When the murder was discovered, Te Rangipatoto a chieftain of Ngāti Tahu set out in pursuit, killed Kereua in his sleep by a stream now called Te Wai-o-Kereua (the waters of Kereua, a tributary of the Waikato River near Rotokawa). Then he took his body to Ohaaki, and cooked it in one of the hot springs there, which is known as Umu-o-Kereua (the oven of Kereua) as a result.

Tu-taka-roa of Ngāti Te Aho, who was based at Tokaanu, wanted revenge on Ngāti Tahu for the murder of Kereua and went to Te Rangi-tua-mātotoru to tell him that he planned to get the help of Ngāti Awa in raising a war party to do this. Ngāti Tahu were close allies of Ngāti Tūwharetoa, so Te Rangi-tua-mātotoru tried to dissuade him, but eventually he gave way, saying “if you return alive, you shall then take the reward from my armpits!” Then Tutakaroa went to the Bay of Plenty and gathered a war party, being joined by contingents from Ngāti Awa and Ngāti Maru under the leadership of Tokiwhati and Paraoa. They attacked the Ngāti Tahu settlement of Piripekapeka and Tu-taka-roa killed their main chief, Tama-kino, who also had Tūwharetoa ancestry.

On his return, Tu-taka-roa visited Te Rangi-tua-mātotoru and told him what had happened. On hearing of the death of Tama-kino, Te Rangi-tua-mātotoru declared that he would have to avenge his death. Therefore, Tutakaroa fled to Tokaanu, where he convinced a section of the people to support him and built a fortress with them at Whaka-oho-kau on the west edge of the Tokaanu delta at Waitahanui. As of 1959, some of the palisade posts of this fortress were still visible, although the site was flooded in 1942.

Meanwhile, Te Rangi-tua-mātotoru summoned allies from the Tūhourangi, Ngāti Whakaue, and Ngāti Rangitihi iwi of Te Arawa to help avenge Tamakino and they sent a large war party. Te Rangi-tua-mātotoru sent most of his own war party towards Whaka-oho-kau by land, but he himself went by canoe. As he went past the Te Arawa camp he overheard them discussing their plans to devastate Tokaanu, which far exceeded the amount of damage that he wanted to cause. Therefore, he snuck into Whaka-oho-kau and made peace. The next morning, the men of Te Arawa rowed up to Whaka-oho-kau in their canoes to attack and Tu-taka-roa waded out into the water to confront them all on his own. When he realised that his men had not come out with him, he turned and fled, making it back to the fortress. While they were fighting, Te Rangi-tua-mātotoru had negotiated a peace and he came out and announced this as the forces of Te Arawa approached. The Te Arawa forces were furious, but were eventually convinced to accept this peace and leave.

=== Assistance for Te Uamairangi ===
There was a chief called Te Ua-mai-rangi of the Ngāti Te Upokoiri hapū of Ngāti Kahungunu who lived at Aorangi in Maraekakaho in Hawke’s Bay. He had expected to succeed the principal chief of the area, Te Tauwhitu of Ngāti Whatuiapiti, but Te Tauwhitu instead brought in an outside candidate as his successor, Tupurupuru. Te Ua-mai-rangi therefore began a conflict between Ngāti Te Upokoiri and Ngāti Whatuiapiti, which would eventually lead to the destruction of Ngāti Te Upokoiri.

Te Uamairangi was a friend of Te Rangi-tua-mātotoru and appealed to him for help in getting from Hawke’s Bay to Whakatane when the Titiokura Saddle was closed in the midst of this struggle. Te Rangi-tua-mātotoru sent an armed force which escorted Te Uamairangi across the Ruahine Range and onwards to Whakatane.

=== Tuhoe-Ngāti Tūwharetoa War ===
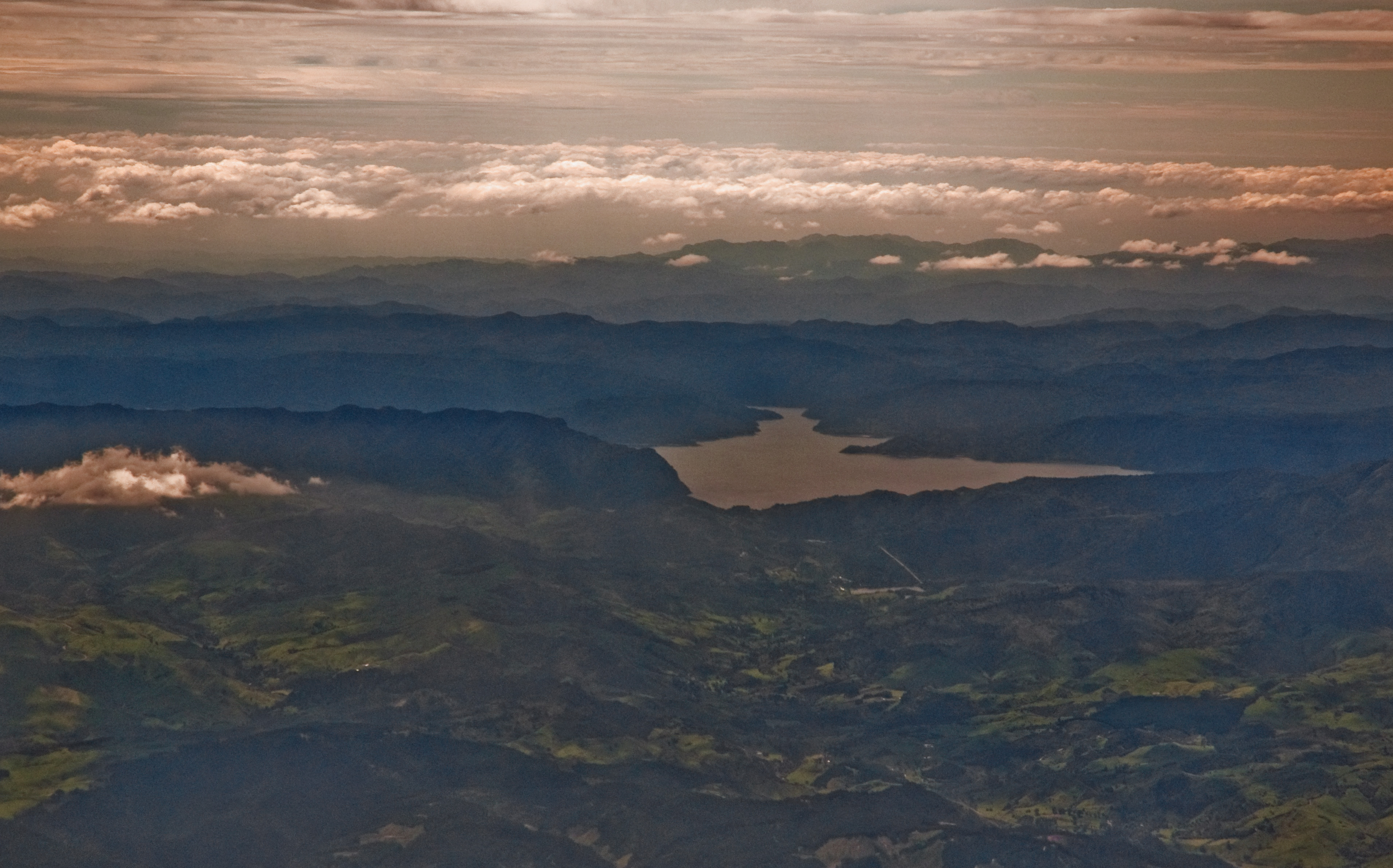
Lake Waikaremoana in Te Urewera

Shortly after this, Tai-hakoa, a Ngāti Tūwharetoa rangatira joined the Ngāti Whare hapū of Te Arawa in a raid on Tūhoe in Te Urewera and was defeated. His intervention in a conflict that had nothing to do with Tūwharetoa so angered the rangatira of Tūhoe that they decided to attack Tūwharetoa in order to get revenge.

While they were raising their war party, two Tūhoe tohunga, Te Wharangi and Te Akaurangi, who were related to the Ngāti Te Aho hapū of Tūwharetoa, travelled to Taupō and visited Te Rangi-tua-mātotoru at Motutere, warning him that Tūhoe was going to invade and that he should not participate in the conflict.

Shortly after, the Tūhoe did invade, capturing four fortresses near Pākā Bay. Tūwharetoa gathered from all over the island to drive the invaders out, but they were defeated at the Battle of Orana and the survivors fled to Te Rangi-tua-mātotoru's village, where Herea made preparations to defend against an attack.

Due to his age, Te Rangi-tua-mātotoru had not participated in the battle, but following the defeat at Orana, he took his canoe to Pākā Bay and shouted to the Tūhoe soldiers to let him speak to Te Purewa. After inquiring as to whether his grandson, Te Hinganui had been killed (he had), he landed and asked to make peace. The Tūhoe and Tūwharetoa forces then met at Ōpepe, where they agreed to end the war. The tatau pounamu (greenstone door, i.e. a state of enduring peace) was established by Te Rangi-tua-mātotoru on behalf of Tūwharetoa, and Te Umuariki and Koroki on behalf of Tūhoe. Then Tūhoe returned to Te Urewera, promising never to attack the Taupō region again.

=== Death and succession ===
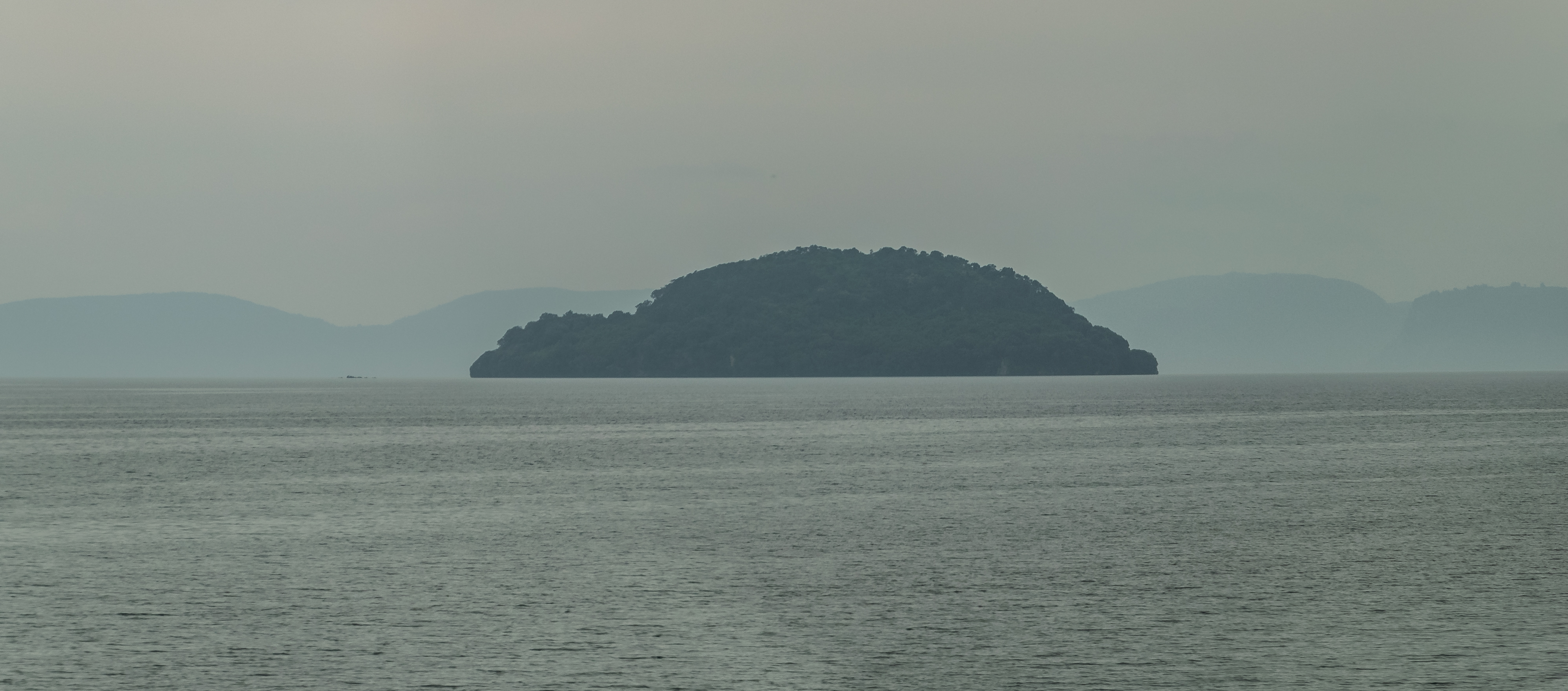
Motutaiko Island, where Te Rangi-tua-mātotoru was laid to rest.

Te Rangi-tua-mātotoru took no active role in the subsequent Battle of Kohikete, in which Ngāti Tūwharetoa defeated Ngāti Warahoe with the help of Pēhi Tūkōrehu of Ngāti Maniapoto. Shortly after this, Te Rangi-tua-mātotoru died. His body lay in state in a small house on Motutaiko Island, with his taiaha, his mats, and a kākā-feather cloak across the door, until it was desecrated by a raiding party of Ngāti Raukawa and Ngāti Maru led by Pataua, Wahine-iti, and Hape in the time of Mananui Te Heuheu Tukino II, who avenged that crime by a devastating attack on the raiding party at Rangatira Point.

Te Rangi-tua-mātotoru's son, Te Rangihirawea, succeeded him as head of Ngāti Te Rangiita, but was not considered for the position as paramount chief of Tūwharetoa. After some struggle, that position was taken by a distant cousin, Herea Te Heuheu Tukino I, whose descendants continue to hold the post.

== Family ==
Te Rangi-tua-mātotoru had two sons:

- Te Rangihirawea, who succeeded him as rangatira of Ngāti Te Rangiita.
- Pipiri, who had one son and two daughters:

- Te Tauri, who married Hurihia, a daughter of Herea Te Heuheu Tūkino I.
- Nohopapa, who became the favourite wife of Mananui Te Heuheu Tūkino II
- Te Mare, who also married Mananui Te Heuheu Tūkino II and had children, including Te Heuheu Tūkino IV.

== Bibliography ==
- Te Hata, Hoeta; Fletcher, H. J. (1917). "Ngati-Tuhare-toa occupation of Taupo-nui-a-tia". Journal of the Polynesian Society. 26: 19–30, 69–99, 180–187.
- Grace, John Te Herekiekie (1959). Tuwharetoa: The history of the Maori people of the Taupo District. Auckland [N.Z.]: A.H. & A.W. Reed.
- Ngata, Apriana; Jones, Pei Te Hurinui (2004). Nga Moteatea: he maramara rere no nga waka maha, Part I. Auckland [N.Z.]: Auckland University Press.
- Waitangi Tribunal (2013). Te Kāhui Maunga: The National Park District Inquiry Report (Wai 1130) (PDF). Vol. 1. Lower Hutt [N. Z.]: Legislation Direct. ISBN 9781869563059.
