= Te Tauri =

Māori rangatira (chieftain)

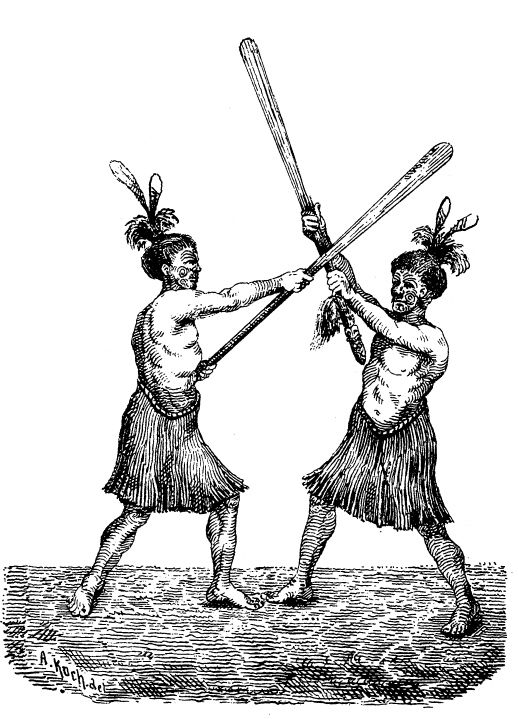
Two Māori men wielding taiaha

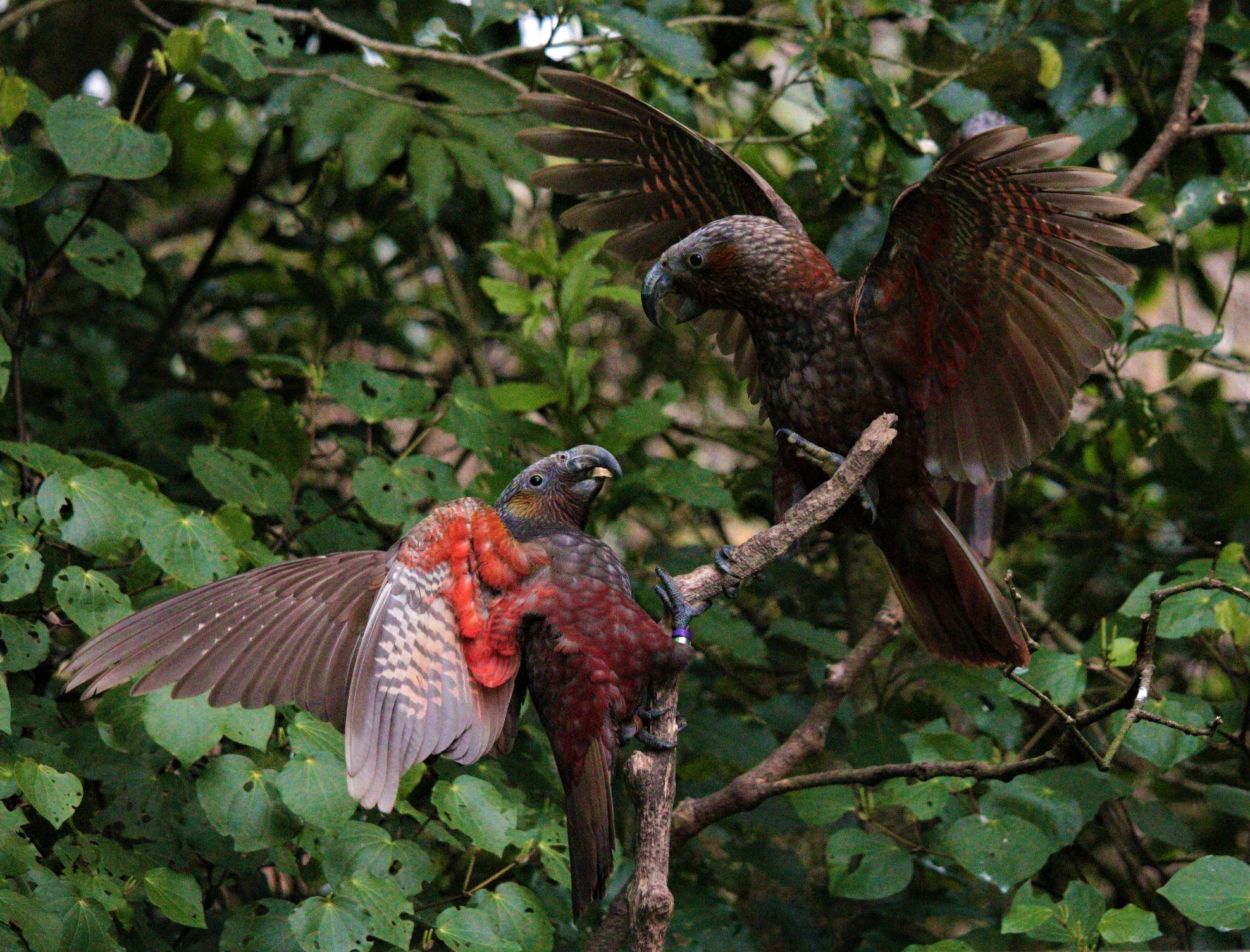
Two kākā showing their red feathers

Te Tauri was an early 19th-century Māori rangatira (chieftain) of the Ngāti Te Rangiita hapū of Ngāti Tūwharetoa from the region around Lake Taupō, New Zealand. He is remembered as a prominent leader and powerful warrior.

== Life ==
Te Tauri was the son of Pipiri and grandson of Te Rangi-tua-mātotoru, paramount chief of Tūwharetoa. He had two sisters, Nohopapa and Te Mare, who married Mananui Te Heuheu Tūkino II and had children, including Te Heuheu Tūkino II's eventual successor, Te Heuheu Tūkino IV. In turn, Te Tauri married Te Heuheu Tūkino II's sister Hurihia, a prominent leader and priestess in her own right.

Sometime after 1822, three chiefs, Pataua, Te Hau o Taranaki, and Wahineiti led a war party of Ngāti Maru through the Taupō region on their way back from Te Rauparaha and Te Rangihaeata’s attack on Kapiti Island. As a result of an old vendetta, they attacked Pūkawa, Motutaiko Island, and Motutere, desecrating the graves of rangatira, including Te Rangi-tua-mātotoru. When the chiefs of Tūwharetoa gathered at Motutere to discuss how to respond to this attack, Te Tauri emerged as the most prominent advocate for inaction, arguing that, since the war party had violated tapu, they were doomed to die whatever happened. Te Heuheu II however, strenuously pushed for Tūwharetoa to take action. Te Heuheu got his way and led a war party which inflicted a major defeat on Ngāti Maru. Te Tauri's prediction also proved to be correct to Māori eyes, as Wahineiti eventually died on route to his home. In the laments of his Ngāti Raukawa people, the death of Wahineiti is attributed not to any weapon but to mākutu (vengeful spirits).

Ngati Maniapoto gave Te Tauri a special taiaha spear called Matuakore ("parentless"), which was decorated with carvings and kākā feathers. Outside of battle, it was kept protected by a special covering and it was believed that the weapon could predict the future. When the covering was removed before battle, the feathers would gleam if he was going to be victorious and would be a dull colour if he was going to be defeated. Te Tauri first used this weapon at the Battle of Pataua. Later, Te Tauri led a force of Ngāti Rangiita into battle against Ngāti Te Kohera and Ngāti Raukawa at Wairakei. He took down two of the enemy chiefs, Te Matua and Te Tangata, but while he was clubbing Te Matua to death with his mere pounamu, Te Tangata woke up, took the taiaha and fled. Because the taiaha had not been taken honourably and was very famous, Te Tangata tried to avoid reprisals first by defacing it, so that it would no longer be identifiable, and, eventually, by burying it.

During a conflict with Ngāti Kahungunu in the Kaimanawa Range, Te Tauri killed two of their men simultaneously – one with the point (arero) and another with the butt (tinana) of his taiaha. Later, Ngāti Kahungunu led a war party to get revenge. They found him alone and unarmed, busy repairing the roof of his house. When he saw that he was surrounded, Te Tauri attempted to jump off the roof and over the attackers, but he was caught and killed. Mananui Te Heuheu Tūkino II refers to this event in a lament for his father, Herea, where he refers to Te Tauri as "the two-fold slayer of the fish of war" (ika huirua).

== Bibliography ==
- White, John (1888). The Ancient History of the Maori, His Mythology and Traditions: Volume V Tai-Nui. Wellington: Government Printer.
- Te Hata, Hoeta; Fletcher, H. J. (1917). "Ngati-Tuhare-toa occupation of Taupo-nui-a-tia". Journal of the Polynesian Society. 26: 19–30, 69–99, 180–187.
- Grace, John Te Herekiekie (1959). Tuwharetoa: The history of the Maori people of the Taupo District. Auckland [N.Z.]: A.H. & A.W. Reed.
- Ngata, Apriana; Jones, Pei Te Hurinui (2004). Nga Moteatea: he maramara rere no nga waka maha, Part I. Auckland [N.Z.]: Auckland University Press.
- Royal, Te A. C.; Edwards, C. (2021). "He Reo Tawhito: A conversation with Dr Te Ahukaramū Charles Royal".
