= Motutere =

Motutere may refer to one of several locations in New Zealand's Waikato Region:

- Castle Rock (Waikato), a mountain which has the alternative Mãori name Motutere
- Motutere, New Zealand, a township on the shore of Lake Taupõ
  - Motutere Bay, an indentation in the shore of Lake Taupõ; see Motutere, New Zealand
