= Bulli Point =

Diving location in Lake Taupō, New Zealand

Coordinates: 38.8824°S 175.9669°E

Bulli Point Te Pōporo (Māori)
- Headland
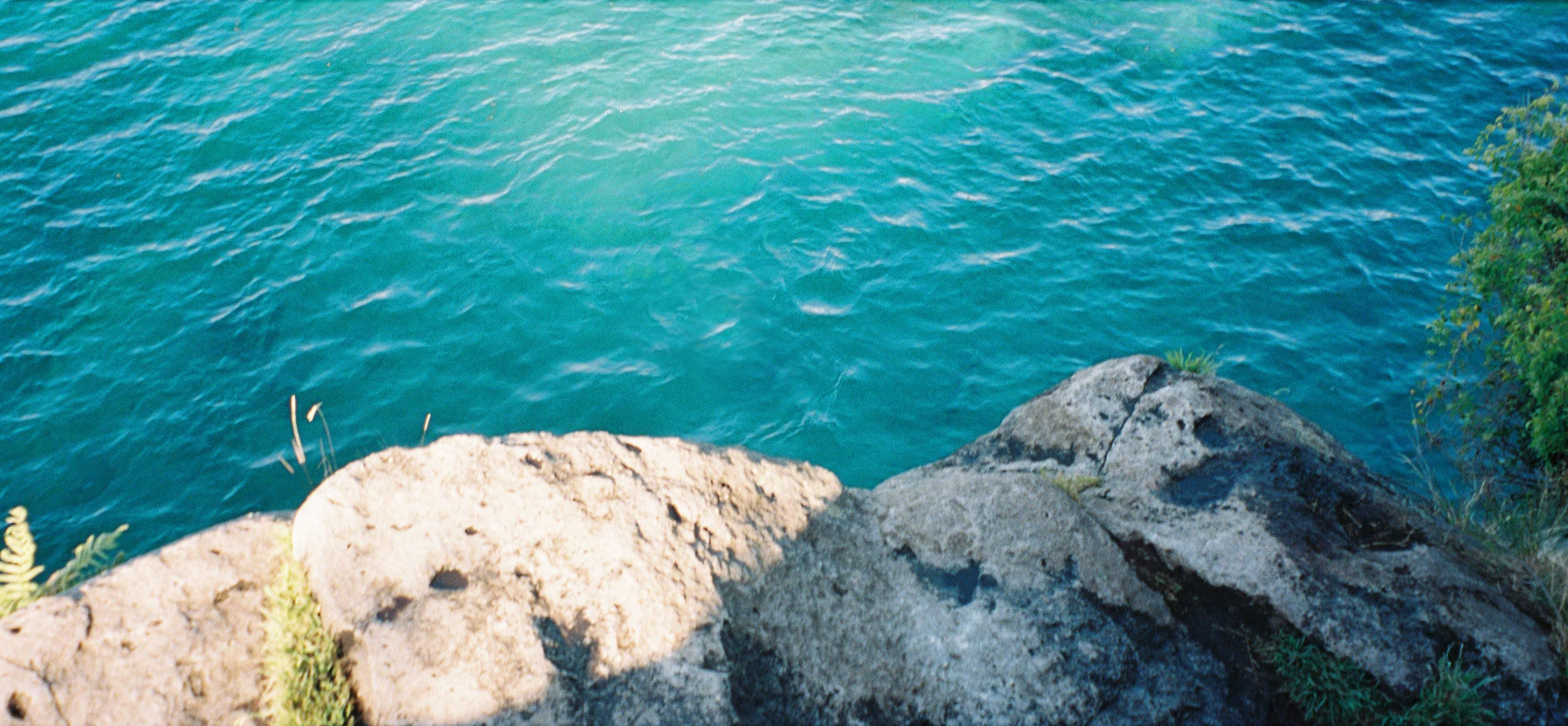
- Looking down into Lake Taupō from Bulli Point
- Location: Lake Taupō, New Zealand

Te Pōporo / Bulli Point and surrounding features.

Bulli Point (Māori: Te Pōporo, officially gazetted as Te Pōporo / Bulli Point) is a point on Lake Taupō, in the central North Island of New Zealand. The point is a popular spot for rock jumping.

== Location ==
Bulli Point sits in Motutere Bay on the eastern side of Lake Taupō. It lies close to State Highway 1, less than one kilometre east of Motutere.

== Naming ==
The name Te Pōporo is a Māori language name taken from the pā that once stood on the hill above the point. It was one of several important pā located between Motutere and Hatepe. The pā may have been named after Pōporo, a Māori name for Solanum aviculare and Solanum laciniatum, a local shrub with white to blue-purple flowers, and yellow to orange fruit, sometimes called bullibulli. A point on the western side of the lake, Te Poroporo Point, also contains a word for the same shrub, Poroporo.

The origin of the name Bulli Point is unclear. Toitū Te Whenua's New Zealand Gazetteer suggests it may be a contraction of Bull Island Point, as this is what it was recorded as on NZMS 3 N102-6 Te Rangiiti.

== In popular culture ==
- Lorde mentions jumping off of Bulli Point in her song "Oceanic Feeling".
