= Te Rangitāhau =

New Zealand tribal leader

Te Rangitāhau (?–1900) was a notable New Zealand tribal leader and warrior. Of Māori descent, he identified with the Ngati Hineuru and Ngati Tuwharetoa iwi. Born in Opepe, New Zealand, he fought in Te Kooti's War. As part of this, he was deported to Wharekauri, which he escaped in 1868, as part of a group of prisoners led by Te Kooti. After Te Kooti planned to attack the northern Ngati Tuwharetoa, he supposedly protested, and later defected, warning his people to flee. In the 1880s, he gave evidence at a Māori Land Court hearing.
