= Herea Te Heuheu Tūkino I =

Hereditary Māori leader (c. 1750 – 1820)

Te Heuheu Tūkino I
- Paramount chief of Ngāti Tūwharetoa
- Predecessor: Te Rangi-tua-mātotoru
- Successor: Te Heuheu Tūkino II
- Full name: Te Heuheu Tūkino I Herea
- Other titles: Rangatira of Ngāti Turumakina
- Other names: Te Rangi-māheu; Hereara
- Known for: Founder of Te Heuheu dynasty
- Years active: c.1780–c.1820
- Born: Herea
- Residence: Waitahanui Pā
- Locality: Taupō Region
- Wars and battles: Tūhoe–Tūwharetoa War; Inter-hapū battles
- Noble family: Te Heuheu
- Spouses: Rangiaho; Tokotoko
- Issue: Mananui; Iwikau; Pāpaka; Kerehi; Hurihia; Manuhiri
- Father: Tūkino
- Mother: Parewairere
- Occupation: Tribal leader Warrior; Commander

Herea or Hereara (c. 1750–1820), later known as Te Rangi-māheuheu and Te Heuheu Tūkino I, was a Māori rangatira of the Ngāti Tūrū-makina, Ngāti Parekāwa, and Ngāti Te Koherā hapū and paramount chief of the Ngāti Tūwharetoa iwi of the region around Lake Taupō, New Zealand, in the late eighteenth and early nineteenth century.

Herea succeeded his father as head of Ngāti Tūrū-makina in the late eighteenth century. He led a force during the Tūhoe–Ngāti Tūwharetoa War. Afterwards, he was one of the candidates to succeed as paramount chief after the death of Te Rangi-tua-mātotoru. Initially, a distant cousin, Te Wakaiti, was the preferred candidate, but he outraged the senior chiefs of Ngāti Tūwharetoa with his arrogant treatment of them and they encouraged Herea to take the position instead, favouring him because of his connections with Ngāti Maniapoto of Waikato. After training in the Rangitoto Ranges, he became a master of the pouwhenua and used his newfound skill to defeat the hapū of Ngāti Te Rangiita and then to take the paramount chieftainship by defeating Te Wakaiti in single combat.

As paramount chief he based himself at Waitahanui pa on the Tongariro River delta, where he slowly built up his prestige and authority. He died around 1820 and, after a brief pause, his son Mananui Te Heuheu Tūkino II succeeded him as paramount chief. His descendants, the Te Heuheu family, continue to hold the paramount chieftainship of Ngāti Tūwharetoa today.

== Life ==
Herea was born in the mid-eighteenth century. His father was Tūkino, through whom he was a direct descendant of Tūrū-makina, ancestor of the Ngāti Tūrū-makina hapū of Tūwharetoa and a member of Aitanga a Huruao, the senior hapū of Ngāti Tūwharetoa, as well as Ngāti Awa in the Bay of Plenty. He was also a relative of the Ngāti Te Rangiita and Ngāti Hinemihi hapū of Tūwharetoa. Herea’s mother, Parewairere, belonged to Ngāti Maniapoto.

Places in the life of Herea
1 Kaiwha
2 Waihaha
3 Motutere
4 Pūkawa
5 Rangitoto Range
6 Tuaropakai (Mōkai)
7 Waitahanui pa
8 Motuoapa

=== The name Te Heuheu ===
When Te Rangi-pūmamao of Ngāti Parekāwa died in the territory of Ngāti Maniapoto, the local people wanted to take the body back to his home for burial, but the journey proved too hard, so they buried him in a cave at Kaiwha on the northwestern corner of Lake Taupō. Several years later, Herea led a group to Kaiwha to search for Te Rangi-pūmamao’s bones. This proved to be a difficult task because they were hidden by brushweed (māheuheu) that had grown up around the cave, but they found them and took them to Waihaha, where they were reburied in Oruawaikaha Cave. When Herea’s wife Te Rangiaho, who was pregnant at the time, was told about this, she declared that she would name the child Te Heuheu, in honour of the brushweed that had protected Te Rangi-pūmamao. At the same time, she gave Herea the name Te Rangi-māheuheu, shortened to Te Heuheu, and the name has become the family name of his descendants.

=== Tūhoe–Ngāti Tūwharetoa War ===
At the outbreak of the Tūhoe–Ngāti Tūwharetoa War, Herea was already leader of Ngāti Turumakina. He raised a war party and marched to fight off the Tūhoe invasion, but did not manage to join up with the Tūwharetoa forces before the Battle of Orona, where they suffered a devastating defeat. Therefore, he brought his forces to Motutere, home of Te Rangi-tua-mātotoru, the elderly paramount chief, and began preparing the village’s defences. No attack ever took place because Te Rangi-tua-mātotoru managed to broker a peace with Tūhoe.

=== Succession to Te Rangi-tua-mātotoru ===
Te Rangi-tua-mātotoru died shortly after concluding peace with Tūhoe. The position of paramount chief was not hereditary, so he was not succeeded by his son. Instead, a group of genealogically senior ariki could choose to appoint any member of Tūwharetoa, if they wished. A group of them, led by Te Whatu-pounamu decided that a new paramount chief should be chosen because Tūwharetoa was under threat from the tribes to the north and west: Ngāti Hauā, Ngati Maru, Ngāti Maniapoto, and Waikato Tainui. These tribes were eager to move into Tūwharetoa territory in the central North Island because they were themselves under pressure from the tribes further north.

The ariki identified three candidates: Tauteka of Ngāti Te Aho (modern Ngāti Kurauia and Ngāti Tūrangitukua), Te Wakaiti of Ngāti Manunui, and Herea. Tauteka was genealogically the senior candidate and a cousin of Te Whatu-pounamu, but he was eliminated from contention because his connections were mainly with Te Arawa, not the northwestern tribes that Tūwharetoa needed to conciliate. Herea was famous warrior and had close connections with Ngāti Maniapoto through his mother and his wife Rangiaho, but he was genealogically the most junior candidate. Te Wakaiti was also a strong warrior with good connections and he had possession of the main tribal atua, Rongomai. As he came from an eastern hapū, his appointment would also help to keep the western and eastern wings of Tūwharetoa united. Therefore the ariki chose to appoint him.

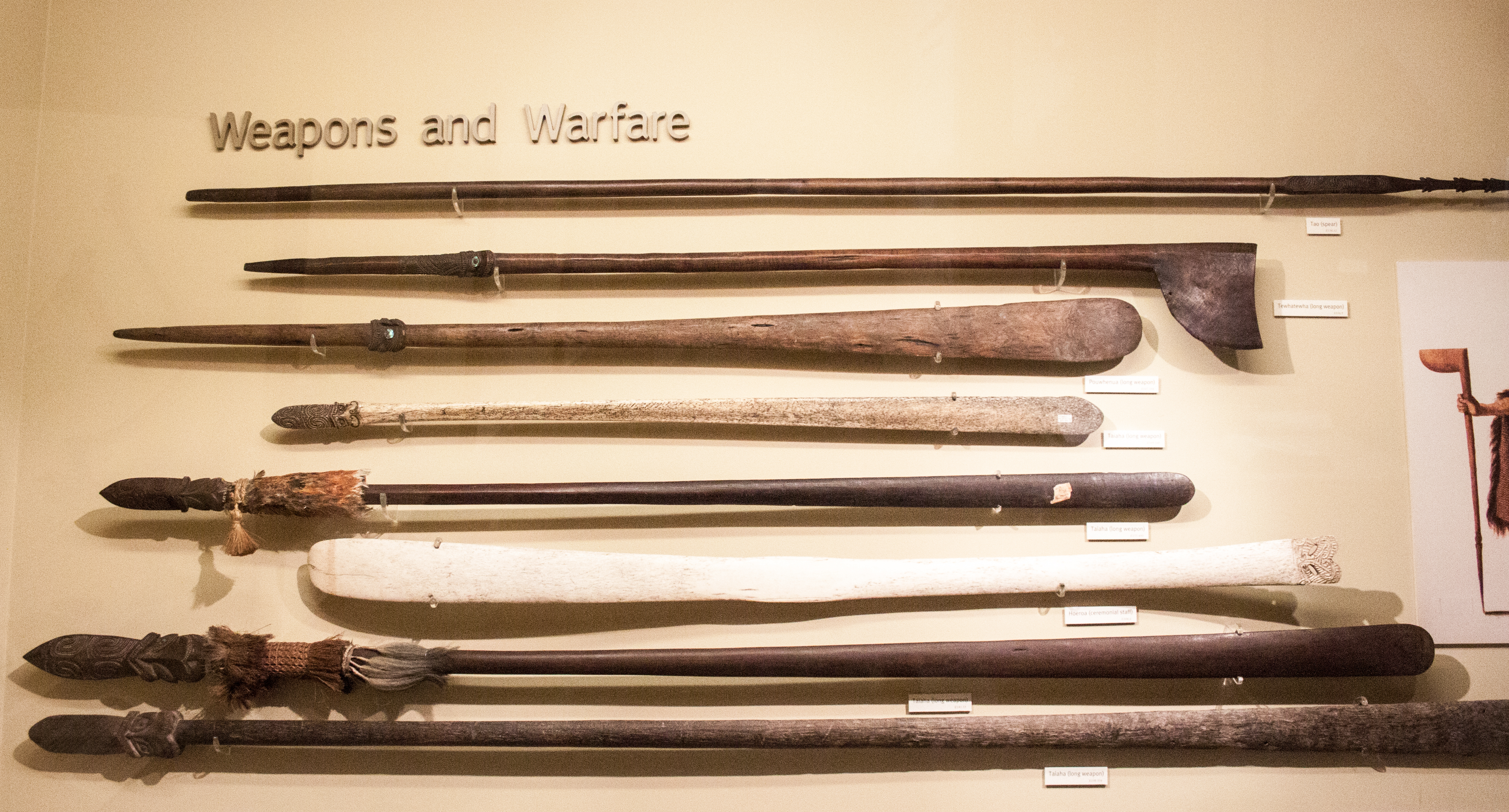
A set of Māori weapons in Canterbury Museum. The pouwhenua is third from the top.

However, Te Wakaiti had decided that the position was his by right. When he found out the Te Whatu-pounamu and the other ariki were coming to his home at Pūkawa to appoint him paramount chief, Te Wakaiti decided to demonstrate his power by murdering the ariki. As they approached, a chieftainess, Te Rangipikitia Rangiwhakaahua shouted at them from Whakarongotukituki Point, trying to warn them that they were in danger. They ignored her and demanded that she go and speak to Te Wakaiti, and he sent her back out to tell them, “if they come near me, I will drill them full of holes so that daylight shines right through them.” This insult convinced Whatu-pounamu and the other ariki to turn around and appoint Herea as paramount chief instead.

When the ariki came to Herea, he realised that he would need to defeat Te Wakaiti in combat if he assumed the post. Therefore, he travelled to the Rangitoto Range and took instruction from Huahua of Maniapoto in the use of the pouwhenua club, which was Te Wakaiti’s favoured weapon. Once he had become a master of the weapon, Huahua gifted him a powhenua called Arerokapakapa (‘the throbbing tongue’).

=== Flying fish split by the war-canoe ===
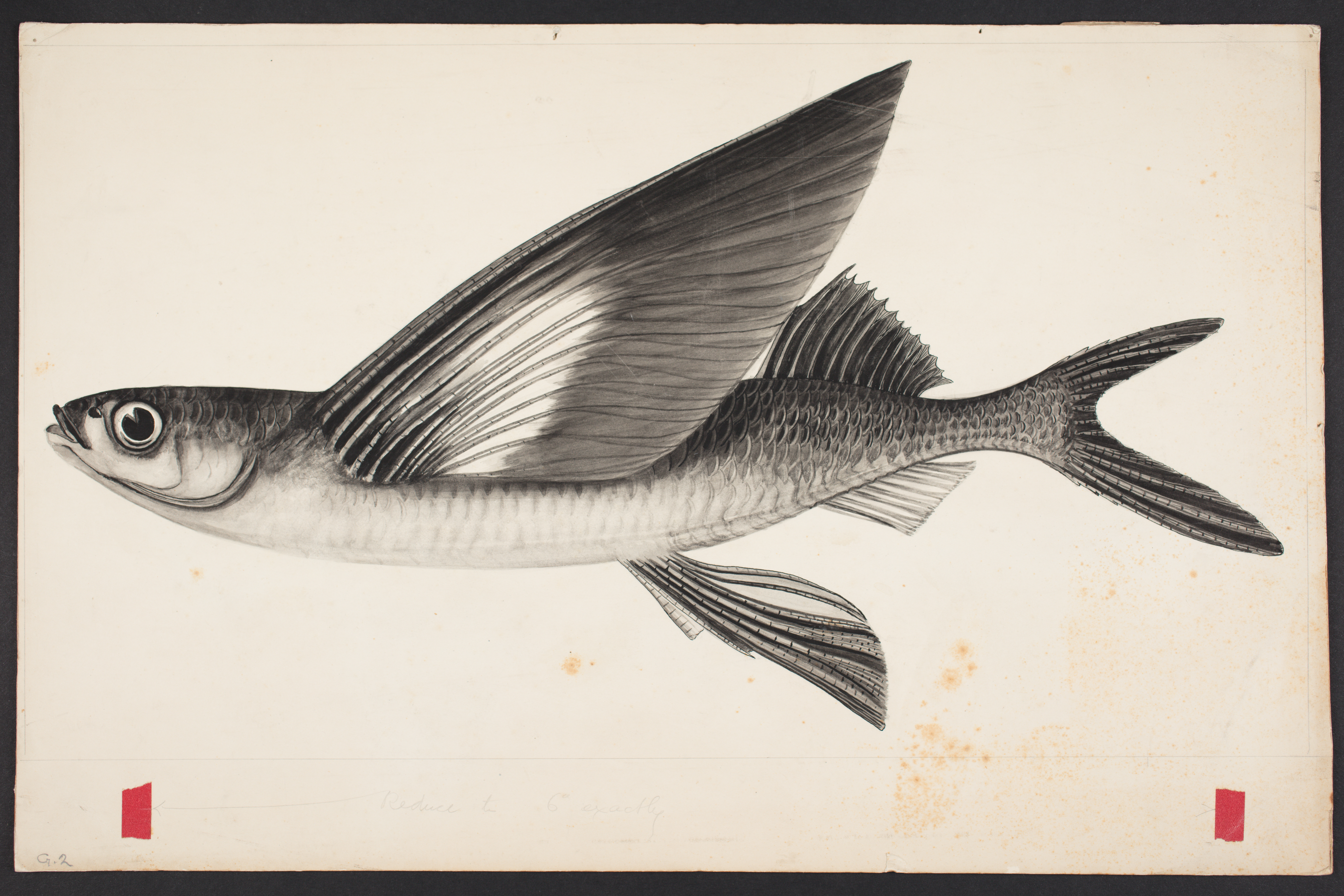
Drawing of a maroro (flying fish), Auckland War Memorial Museum.

According to Huahua, if Herea was to be successful in his bid for power, he had to use Arerokapakapa on his journey home. Therefore, when he stopped at Tuaropakai (Mōkai) and the local chief, Te Hoariri of Ngāti Parekāwa, asked him to lead a raid on Ngāti Te Rangiita in revenge for an earlier slight, Herea jumped at the chance, dismissing Te Hoariri’s warnings about the prowess of Ngāti Te Rangiita, with the dedication (now proverbial), “that’s nothing! It is just a grasshopper – two hops and it is caught by the dragonfly!” Herea led his forces to Ohua, where he encountered men of Ngāti Te Rangiita, Ngāti Te Koherā, and Ngāti Ha, who began to insult him. Following the principle of maroro kokoti ihu waka (a flying fish that gets split by the bow of a war-canoe), he attacked the group and killed their chieftain Te Pohoiti. Then he attacked other members of the tribe, who were out planting kumara, and killed them too, including a young boy called Pango. The lament for him is preserved by John Te Herekiekie Grace. It opens:

E muri ahiahi, kia hoki mai au I te Piki a Tane
Kei whea ra, e, taku potiki,
Kia tau whakaete ake I waenganui I nga mokai nei?

Translation:

As evening falls, I return from Piki a Tane
But where is my child who is outstanding
Among those that I now find here?

— Grace 1970, pp. 226–227

Grace also records another song, written by Karangi of Pakawa, a relative of Te Pohoiti, which denigrates Herea as a “carved calabash” (ipu whakairo).

=== Paramount chief ===
Once he had returned from Rangitoto, Herea travelled with Whatu-pounamu and the other ariki to Pūkawa and challenged Te Wakaiti to a duel, quickly defeating him. Te Whatu-pounamu directed Herea to perform the ngau taringa (biting of the ear) ritual, in order to take Te Wakaiti’s mana for himself and become the new custodian of the atua Rongomai, but Te Whatu-pounamu prevented him from actually biting Te Wakaiti’s head, a treatment reserved for slaves and prisoners of war. Nevertheless, the prestige of Te Wakaiti and Ngāti Manunui was significantly reduced.

As paramount chief, Herea based himself at Waitahanui pa on the Tongariro River delta. Herea’s position as paramount chief was only gradually accepted by all the hapū of Ngāti Tūwharetoa. He was also outranked in ritual and ceremonial matters by more genealogically senior ariki. In particular, the hapū of Ngāti Te Koherā was hostile to him, because they were closely linked to Ngāti Raukawa, the traditional rivals of Herea’s mother and wife’s iwi, Ngāti Maniapoto. Angela Ballara argued that the paramount chieftainship was still a very loose institution in this period and only became solidified in the 1830s or 1840s under Herea’s son, Te Heuheu II. The Waitangi Tribunal concluded that his authority was based on his military prowess and his knowledge of tribal lore and that his position was one of ‘first among equals’.

=== Death ===
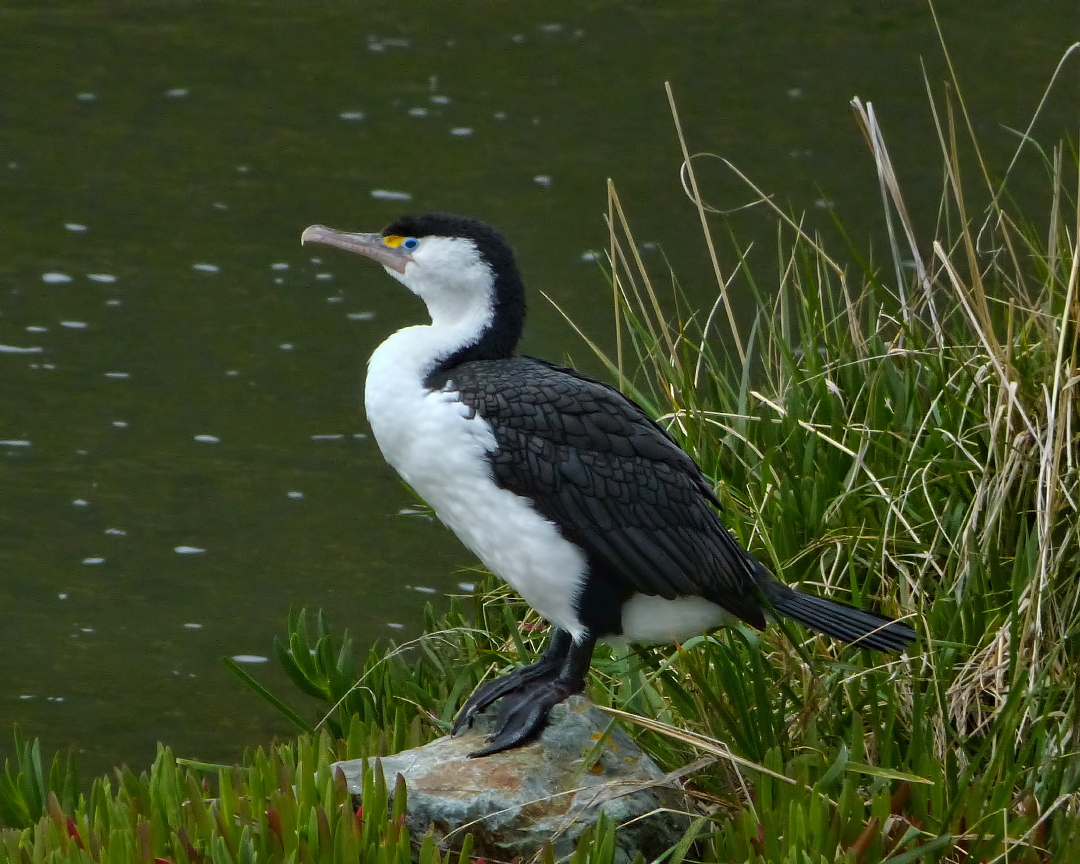
Kawau aroarotea (the snowy-breasted shag, Australian pied cormorant).

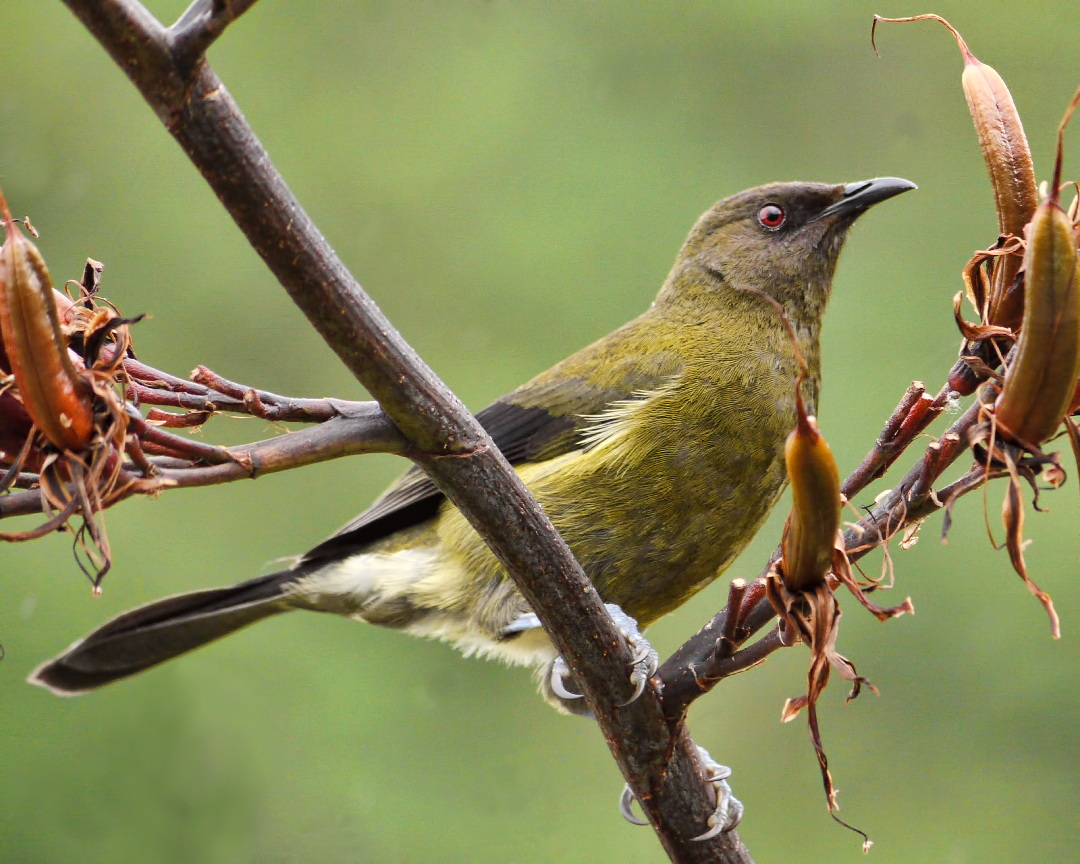
Kōmako (New Zealand bellbird).

Herea died at Waitahanui and his body was interred in a cave on the Motuoapa Peninsula. Later, Ngāti Te Rangiita transferred his remains to a cave in the nearby Parikarangaranga cliffs. His son, Te Heuheu II wrote a lament for him, which is preserved by John Te Herekiekie Grace:

Tataka kau ana nga manu o tea ta, ka riro ko ko era!
Haere, e Pa, I te hahatanga o Pipiri
E kore au e mihi, mei ririo ana koe
I te puta tu ata, I whakarakea I te awatea.
Kawau aroarotea tena ka tu, ka pae kei o taua aroaro;
Tiria atu ra ki te aroaro o te atua
I whakakateatia i te ahiahi.
Taku manu noho matarae i whangaia ki te hau;
Aku ika huirua tena ka tiu kei te paenga i o riri;
Taku komako whakahau no nga rake manawa o te tahatika ki Pungarehu!
Ka whangaia koe ki runga i Te Ahurewa,
Ka kai Uenuku, e ra!

— Mananui Te Heuheu Tūkino II
Translation:

Sad and desolate flutter the birds of the morning,
For thou, O Father, are gone!
Depart O mighty one on winter’s icy breath.
In the dawn of day, you are gone –
As I, like snowy-breasted shag, bird of the stream and lake,
Swoop swiftly over plains and view your battlefields again.
Go by the sacred way to the dwelling of the gods
While shades of evening fall.
O sweet-voiced bird! My cherished kōmako, that once sang happily at dawn,
From Pungarehu’s bank, you are gone!
A sacrifice, you are, on sacred Ahurewa,
Devoured by Uenuku, farewell

— Grace 1970, pp. 230–231

After a period without a paramount leader, Mananui Te Heuheu II was chosen as the new paramount chief and the position has been held by Herea’s descendants ever since. The current holder is Tumu Te Heuheu.

== Family ==
Herea married Rangiaho of Ngāti Maniapoto before he became paramount chief. After he had become paramount chief, Herea fell in love with Tokotoko, during a visit to Ngāti Maniapoto and married her. Rangiaho responded to this by hanging herself on the fortifications of Whakatara. Herea’s lament for Rangiaho is preserved:

Ascend, O Lady, to the first heaven,
And to the second heaven! I pay tribute
To you as mother, and to you as fond parent.
I unthinking have lost the spray of the ocean
Into the limbo of the void.

— Herea, in Hura, Elizabeth. "Herea Te Heuheu Tūkino I". Dictionary of New Zealand Biography. Ministry for Culture and Heritage.

Herea and Rangiaho had three sons:

- Mananui Te Heuheu Tūkino II, who was born in Pamotumotu, King Country, New Zealand, near the Mangatutu Stream and was the second of the Te Heuheu line to hold the leadership of Ngāti Tūwharetoa, from the 1820s to 1846.
- Iwikau Te Heuheu Tukino III, the third member of the Te Heuheu line to hold the paramount chieftainship of Ngāti Tūwharetoa, from 1846 to 1862, and the only one to sign the Treaty of Waitangi.
- Pāpaka, who married Pikihuia and was killed at Haowhenua by Te Āti Awa in 1834

Herea and Tokotoko had a son and a daughter:

- Karihi Te Kehakeha aka Tōkena Te Kehakeha aka Tōkena Kerēhi, who married Erina Te Huri.

- Hoko Pātena aka Pātena Hokopakake aka Pātena Kerehi

- Hurihia, who married Te Tauri, grandson of Te Rangi-tua-mātotoru.

Other children include:

- Manuhiri, who was killed attacking Maungawharau, near Waimārama.

== Bibliography ==
- Grace, John Te Herekiekie (1970) [1959]. Tuwharetoa: The history of the Maori people of the Taupo District. Auckland [N.Z.]: A.H. & A.W. Reed. ISBN 9780589003739.
- Waitangi Tribunal (2013). Te Kāhui Maunga: The National Park District Inquiry Report (Wai 1130) (PDF). Vol. 1. Lower Hutt [N. Z.]: Legislation Direct. ISBN 9781869563059.
