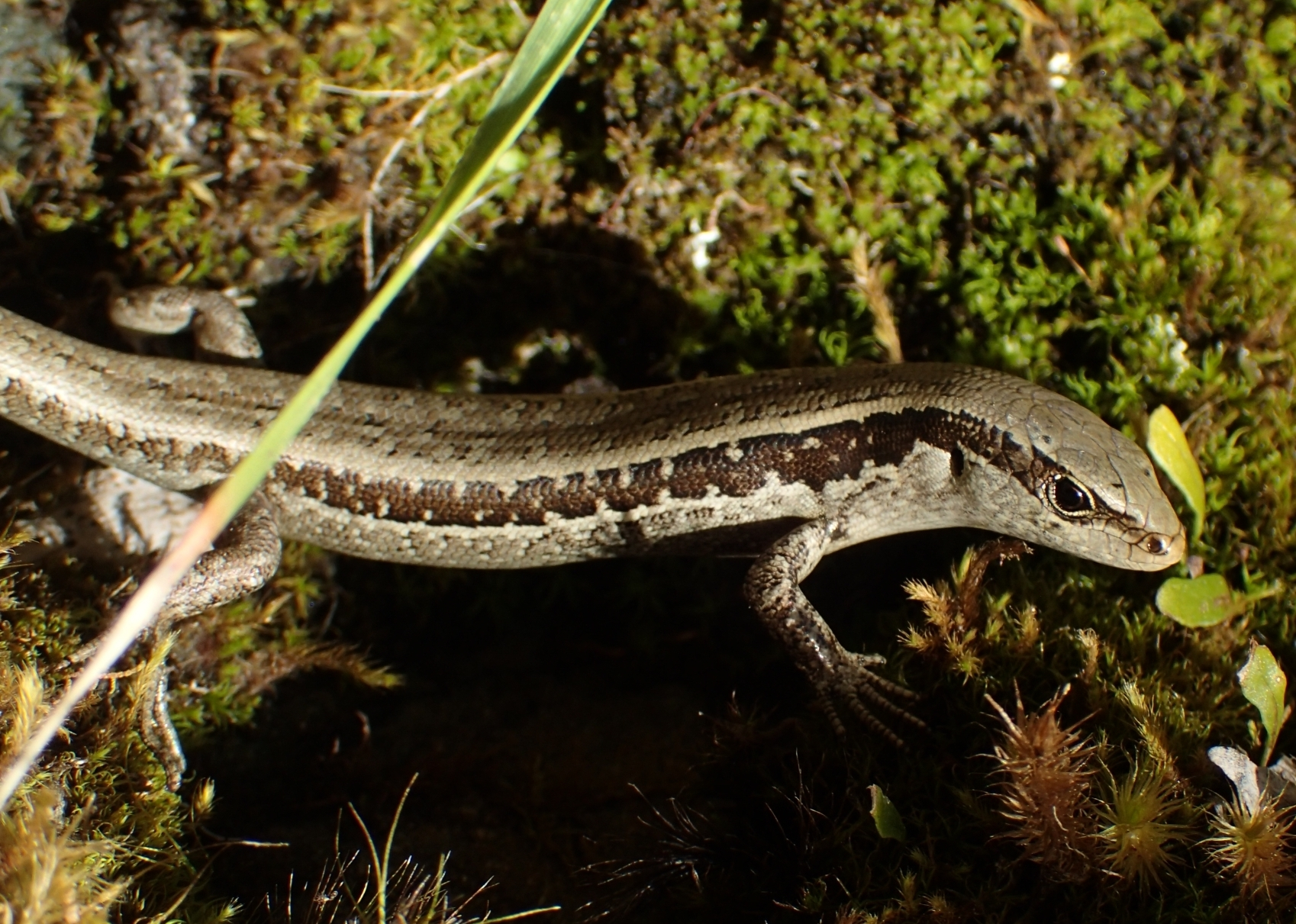
- Oligosoma microlepis found in the central Rangitīkei District, New Zealand

Conservation status
- Endangered (IUCN 3.1)

Scientific classification
- Kingdom: Animalia
- Phylum: Chordata
- Class: Reptilia
- Order: Squamata
- Family: Scincidae
- Genus: Oligosoma
- Species: O. microlepis

Binomial name
- Oligosoma microlepis (Patterson & Daugherty, 1990)
- Distribution of the small-scaled skink on a map of the North Island Known native range

= Small-scaled skink =

Species of lizard

The small-scaled skink (Oligosoma microlepis) is a species of skink in the family Scincidae. The first specimen was captured in 1971 on Motutaiko Island, Lake Taupō but it is now known to be endemic to the central North Island of New Zealand in small population pockets. The holotype is in the collection of the Museum of New Zealand Te Papa Tongarewa.

== Conservation status ==
As of 2012 the Department of Conservation (DOC) classified the small-scaled skink as "Nationally Vulnerable" under the New Zealand Threat Classification System.
