= Ohaaki Power Station =

Power station in New Zealand

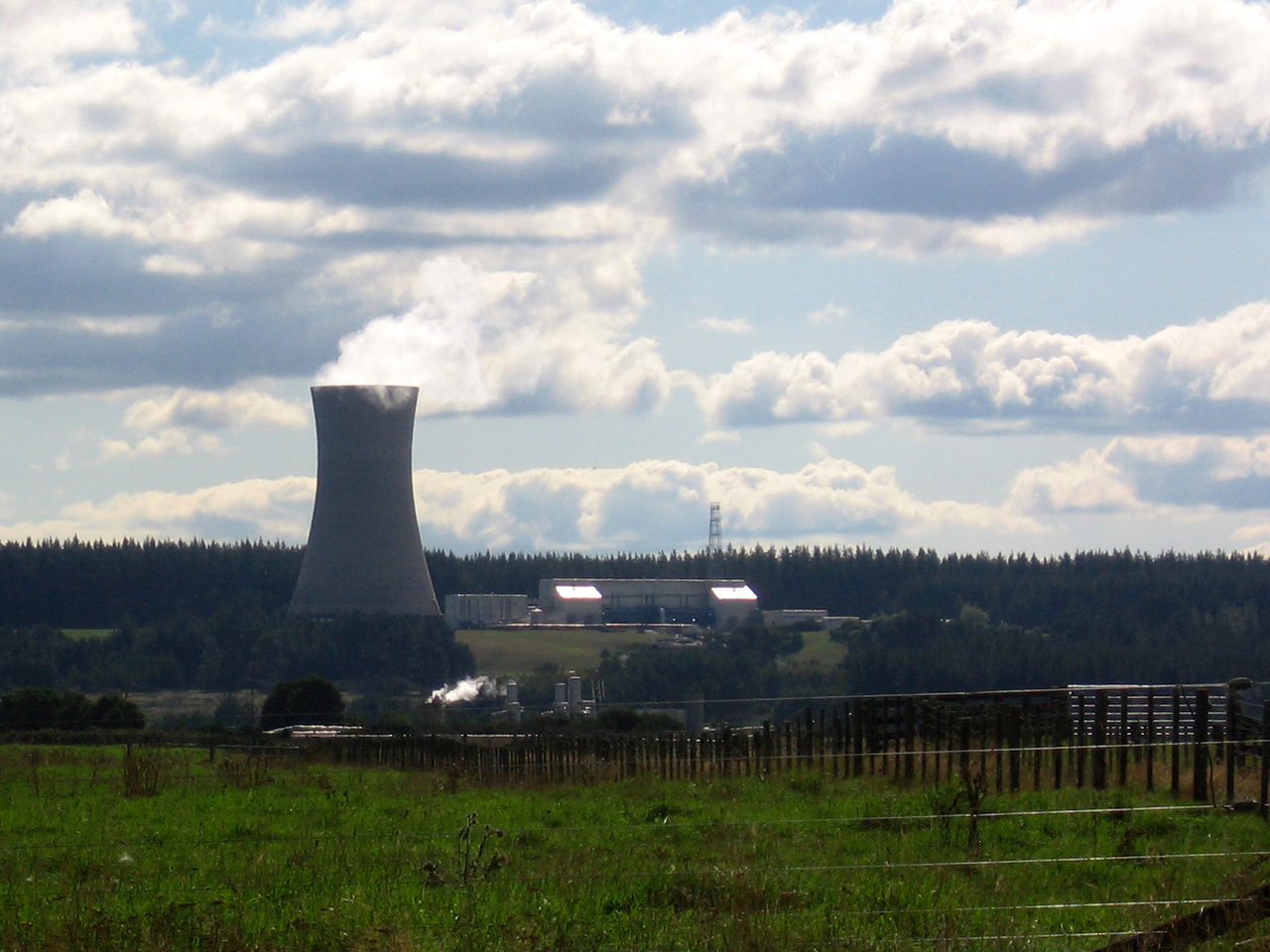
- Country: New Zealand
- Location: Waikato
- Coordinates: 38°31′37″S 176°17′31″E
- Status: Operational
- Commission date: 1989
- Owner: Contact Energy

Power generation
- Nameplate capacity: 104 MW

The Ohaaki Power Station is a geothermal power station owned and operated by Contact Energy. A distinctive feature of this power station is the 105 m high natural draft cooling tower, the only one of its kind in New Zealand.

Although initially constructed to generate 104 MW, decline in the steamfield has meant maximum net capacity is about 65 MW with an annual output of around 400 GWh pa.

There are currently three turbines in operation. One smaller turbine runs off high pressure steam which then backfeeds into the main intermediate pressure system that feeds the two main units. Condensers on the back end of the main turbines are fed cooled water from the cooling tower to condense the steam back into water. Additional condensate gained in this process is reinjected back into the ground.

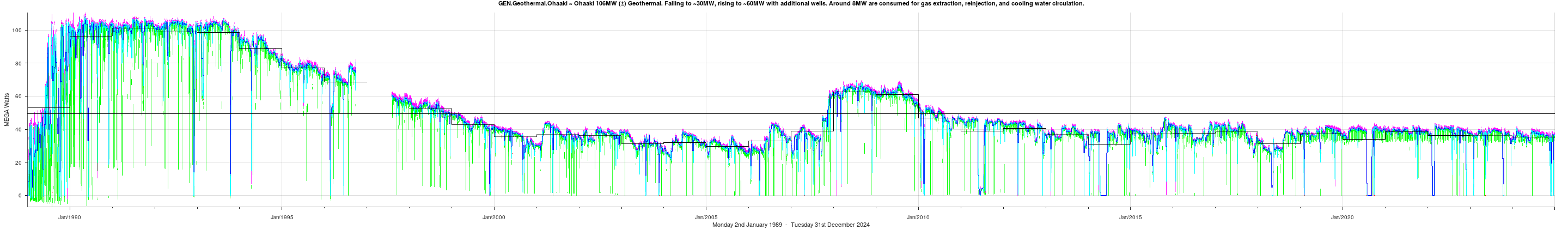
Electricity Generation at Ohaaki, New Zealand.

In 2013, the Waikato Regional Council granted resource consents for a term of 35 years and for a take of 40,000 tonnes per day of geothermal fluid.

== Ohaaki Marae ==
The plant is located adjacent to the Ohaaki Marae (Ngāti Tahu) on the banks of the Waikato River in New Zealand. Gradual sinking of the marae has been attributed to draw-off of geothermal fluids by the power station. The area of the marae is sinking approximately 170mm a year. In the 1960s, the marae was moved to its present location because the previous site was flooded when the dam for the Ohakuri Power Station was filled.

== Climate ==
Climate data for Broadlands (2km SE of Ohaaki Power Station, 1951–1980)
Month	Jan	Feb	Mar	Apr	May	Jun	Jul	Aug	Sep	Oct	Nov	Dec	Year
Mean daily maximum °C (°F)	23.5 (74.3)	23.9 (75.0)	21.5 (70.7)	18.3 (64.9)	14.4 (57.9)	11.7 (53.1)	11.0 (51.8)	12.6 (54.7)	14.8 (58.6)	17.5 (63.5)	19.5 (67.1)	21.5 (70.7)	17.5 (63.5)
Daily mean °C (°F)	16.8 (62.2)	17.5 (63.5)	15.5 (59.9)	12.5 (54.5)	9.0 (48.2)	6.6 (43.9)	5.9 (42.6)	7.4 (45.3)	9.3 (48.7)	11.6 (52.9)	13.4 (56.1)	15.2 (59.4)	11.7 (53.1)
Mean daily minimum °C (°F)	10.1 (50.2)	11.0 (51.8)	9.4 (48.9)	6.7 (44.1)	3.5 (38.3)	1.5 (34.7)	0.8 (33.4)	2.2 (36.0)	3.7 (38.7)	5.7 (42.3)	7.2 (45.0)	8.9 (48.0)	5.9 (42.6)
Average rainfall mm (inches)	82 (3.2)	84 (3.3)	78 (3.1)	96 (3.8)	95 (3.7)	102 (4.0)	104 (4.1)	91 (3.6)	80 (3.1)	97 (3.8)	80 (3.1)	106 (4.2)	1,095 (43)
Source: NIWA
