= Opepe, New Zealand =

Opepe
- Location within New Zealand
- Coordinates: 38.767°S 176.221°E
- Country: New Zealand
- District: Taupo District

Opepe (Note: In modern orthography of the Māori language, this would be spelled Ōpepe.) was a settlement in New Zealand, a few miles southeast of Taupō. It was the scene of an attack on European militia by Māori on 7 June 1869, in which nine members of the militia were killed.

The Opepe Maori settlement was at the intersection of two major pre-European walking tracks (Taupo-Napier and Urewera-Tokaanu). It was the birthplace of the Māori leader Te Rangitahau.

The New Zealand Ministry for Culture and Heritage gives a translation of "place of the moth" for Ōpepe.

During Te Kooti's War, in early June 1869 Te Kooti and about 150 of his supporters moved towards Lake Taupō in the center of the North Island. At Opepe, just short of Taupō, they ran into party of fourteen Militia, who were camped in the abandoned village. Nine of the militia were killed with no loss to Te Kooti. One of the men, who was drying his uniform, escaped completely naked across rough country in mid-winter, and was awarded the New Zealand Medal. A military stockade was built at Opepe in 1869 but closed in 1885. The township thrived for several years in the late 19th century.

Today, there is a very small cemetery on the Napier-Taupo road with five graves maintained by the Ministry for Culture and Heritage. Two of the graves hold the bodies of the nine members of the Bay of Plenty Cavalry who were killed on 7 June 1869 by Te Kooti's advance guard. The other three are the graves of later settlers. New Zealand State Highway 5 passes through Opepe today. Little remains of the settlement.
