= Hinemaiaia Stream =

Coordinates: 38°51′S 176°01′E

Location
- Country: New Zealand

Physical characteristics
- Source
  - location: Kaimanawa Range
- Mouth
  - location: Lake Taupō
- Length: 22 km (14 mi)

The Hinemaiaia Stream is a river of the central North Island of New Zealand. It flows northwest from Kaimanawa Forest Park, flowing into the eastern shore of Lake Taupō at Hatepe, halfway between Taupō and Tūrangi. It is a popular fly fishing stream, with good numbers of Rainbow trout spawning in the winter months of June through to September.

== See also ==
- List of rivers of New Zealand
