= Hatepe =

Settlement in Waikato, New Zealand

- Rural settlement
- Interactive map of Hatepe
- Coordinates: 38.854°S 176.012°E
- Country: New Zealand
- Region: Waikato region
- District: Taupō District
- Ward: Turangi-Tongariro General Ward
- Electorates: Taupō; Waiariki (Māori)

Government
  - Territorial Authority: Taupō District Council
  - Regional council: Waikato Regional Council
  - Mayor of Taupō: John Funnell
  - Taupō MP: Louise Upston
  - Waiariki MP: Rawiri Waititi

Area
  - Total: 0.22 km^{2} (0.085 sq mi)

Population (June 2025)
  - Total: 40
  - Density: 180/km^{2} (470/sq mi)

Hatepe is a small community northeast of Tauranga Taupō and southwest of Waitahanui, on the southeastern side of New Zealand's Lake Taupō. State Highway 1 runs past it. Hinemaiaia River runs into the lake at the north end of the settlement.

The name means "to cut off" or "to proceed in an orderly manner" in the Māori language.

Hatepe was the site of a pā in the mid-19th century. Land was gifted by Ngāti Tūwharetoa for a native school in 1886, but no school was built, and in 1890 the iwi requested the land be returned. It was finally returned in 1971.

The area was farmed by the Morehu family from the 1930s. There was a campground on the foreshore. When the Hinemaiaia River was dammed for a hydroelectric scheme in 1952, the foreshore was flooded and more permanent structures erected on dry land.

== Demographics ==
Statistics New Zealand describes Hatepe as a rural settlement, which covers 0.22 km^{2} (0.085 sq mi). It had an estimated population of 40 as of June 2025, with a population density of 182 people per km^{2}. The settlement is part of the larger Lake Taupō Bays statistical area.

Historical population
Year	Pop.	±% p.a.
2006	42	—
2013	57	+4.46%
2018	24	−15.89%
2023	42	+11.84%

Hatepe had a population of 42 in the 2023 New Zealand census, an increase of 18 people (75.0%) since the 2018 census, and a decrease of 15 people (−26.3%) since the 2013 census. There were 24 males and 18 females in 18 dwellings. The median age was 43.4 years (compared with 38.1 years nationally). There were 9 people (21.4%) aged under 15 years, 3 (7.1%) aged 15 to 29, 21 (50.0%) aged 30 to 64, and 9 (21.4%) aged 65 or older.

People could identify as more than one ethnicity. The results were 57.1% European (Pākehā), and 71.4% Māori. English was spoken by 92.9%, and Māori by 50.0%. The percentage of people born overseas was 14.3, compared with 28.8% nationally.

Religious affiliations were 14.3% Christian, and 35.7% Māori religious beliefs. People who answered that they had no religion were 50.0%, and 7.1% of people did not answer the census question.

Of those at least 15 years old, 6 (18.2%) people had a bachelor's or higher degree, 18 (54.5%) had a post-high school certificate or diploma, and 3 (9.1%) people exclusively held high school qualifications. The median income was $45,200, compared with $41,500 nationally. 3 people (9.1%) earned over $100,000 compared to 12.1% nationally. The employment status of those at least 15 was 18 (54.5%) full-time and 3 (9.1%) part-time.
