= Motutaiko Island =

Island on New Zealand's North Island

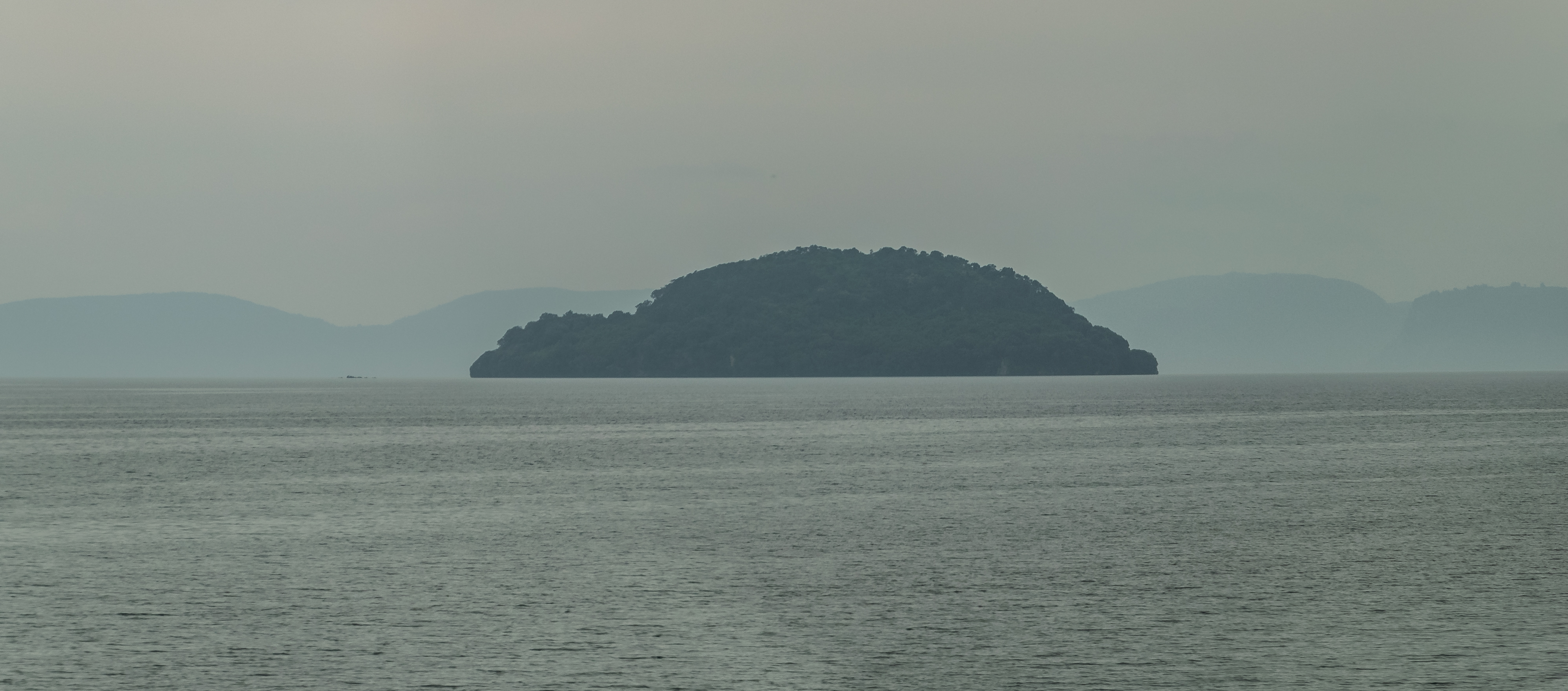
- Motutaiko Island as seen from Tauranga Taupō

- Motutaiko Island's location within New Zealand Motutaiko Island (North Island)

Geography
- Location: Lake Taupō
- Coordinates: 38.854°S 175.942°E
- Area: 11 ha (27 acres)
- Length: 400 m (1300 ft)
- Width: 550 m (1800 ft)
- Coastline: 1,500 m (4900 ft)
- Highest elevation: 452 m (1483 ft)

Administration
- New Zealand

Motutaiko Island is the only island within Lake Taupō on the North Island of New Zealand. It sits near the town of Motutere. The name "Motutaiko" is from the Māori language, with "motu" meaning island, and "taiko" being a name for the black petrel (Procellaria parkinsoni).

== Natural features ==
=== Geology ===
Motutaiko Island is formed out of a column of rhyolitic lava, connected to the geologic systems of the Taupō Volcano. The island was likely formed after an underwater magma vent's releases cooled and hardened into a cone, with Motutaiko forming the apex at 452 m (1,483 ft) above sea level.

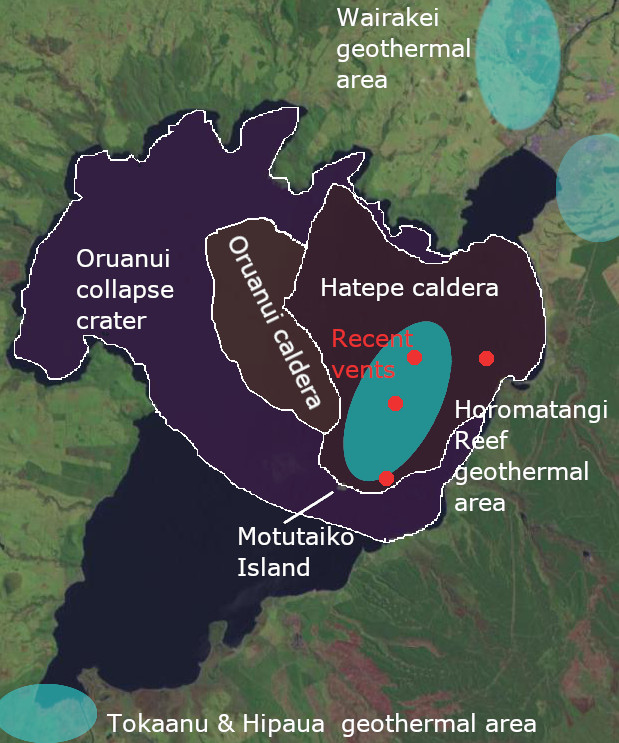
Motutaiko Island's location in Lake Taupō showing relationship to recent volcanic vents in red and present active geothermal systems in light blue.

There has recently been little volcanic seismicity directly under Motutaiko Island compared to adjacent areas of Lake Taupō.

=== Biology ===
Several endangered species live on the island, including Wainuia clarki. Other animals present on the island include a colony of cormorants and the small-scaled skink. The type specimen for this small skink was captured there in 1971 before being found elsewhere in the central North Island. Its bellbird population was preserved during the species great dieback after European colonisation and may have allowed more rapid repopulation in the Taupō area.

== Māori tradition ==
The island is spiritually significant to the Māori people, and landing on the island is therefore prohibited by the government. Te Rangi-tua-matotoru, a major chief of the Ngāti Tūwharetoa, was buried in a sacred cave on the island in the late 18th century.

The taniwha of Lake Taupō, named Horomatangi, is said to live in a cave on the island's northeastern face. The creature is also said to be the pet of Ngātoro-i-rangi.
