= Pākā Bay =

Bay in New Zealand

Coordinates: 38.8736°S 175.9964°E

Pākā Bay, formerly called Halletts Bay is a bay on the eastern shore of Lake Taupō, New Zealand, about 27km south-east of Taupō township. It was known as Hamaria, in the nineteenth century. and before that Paka. The early Māori explorer Tia built a tūāhu (ceremonial altar) to signify he occupied the land and named the cliffs Taupō-nui-a-Tia (the great cloak of Tia). This name was later given to the lake by the occupying tribes that followed.

== History ==
Ngātoro-i-rangi is a principal ancestor of Ngāti Tūwharetoa. He was the priest navigator of the Te Arawa waka, and upon his arrival in Aotearoa he journeyed inland, seeking land for his people. Eventually, he arrived in the Taupō area. He climbed Tauhara mountain and then travelled eastwards around the lake. He arrived at Pākā Bay and found a tūāhu (altar) already constructed by Tia (an important tupuna for Tūwharetoa) that included green leaves, indicating it was of recent construction. Ngātoro-i-rangi used old, scorched materials to build his own tūāhu, which he used to conduct certain sacred rites and to establish his claim to the lands. He showed Tia his tūāhu and, seeing the older materials, Tia agreed that Ngātoro-i-rangi had a prior claim to the land. Accepting Ngātoro-i-rangi's claim, Tia left for Titiraupenga on the western shores of Lake Taupō. Pākā is a Te Reo Māori word meaning "to be burnt" or "scorched", and is a reference to Ngātoro-i-rangi scorching branches of leaves.

Missionaries renamed Pākā 'Hamaria' in the mid-1800s (a transliteration of Samaria). Later, it was renamed again 'Halletts Bay', before being restored to "Pākā Bay". Following the passage of the Ngāti Tūwharetoa Claims Settlement Act 2018, the name of the bay was officially altered to Pākā Bay in March 2019.

== Geological Features ==
Pākā Bay encompasses the following point/s;

- Toki Point
