= Mananui Te Heuheu Tūkino II =

Māori tribal leader

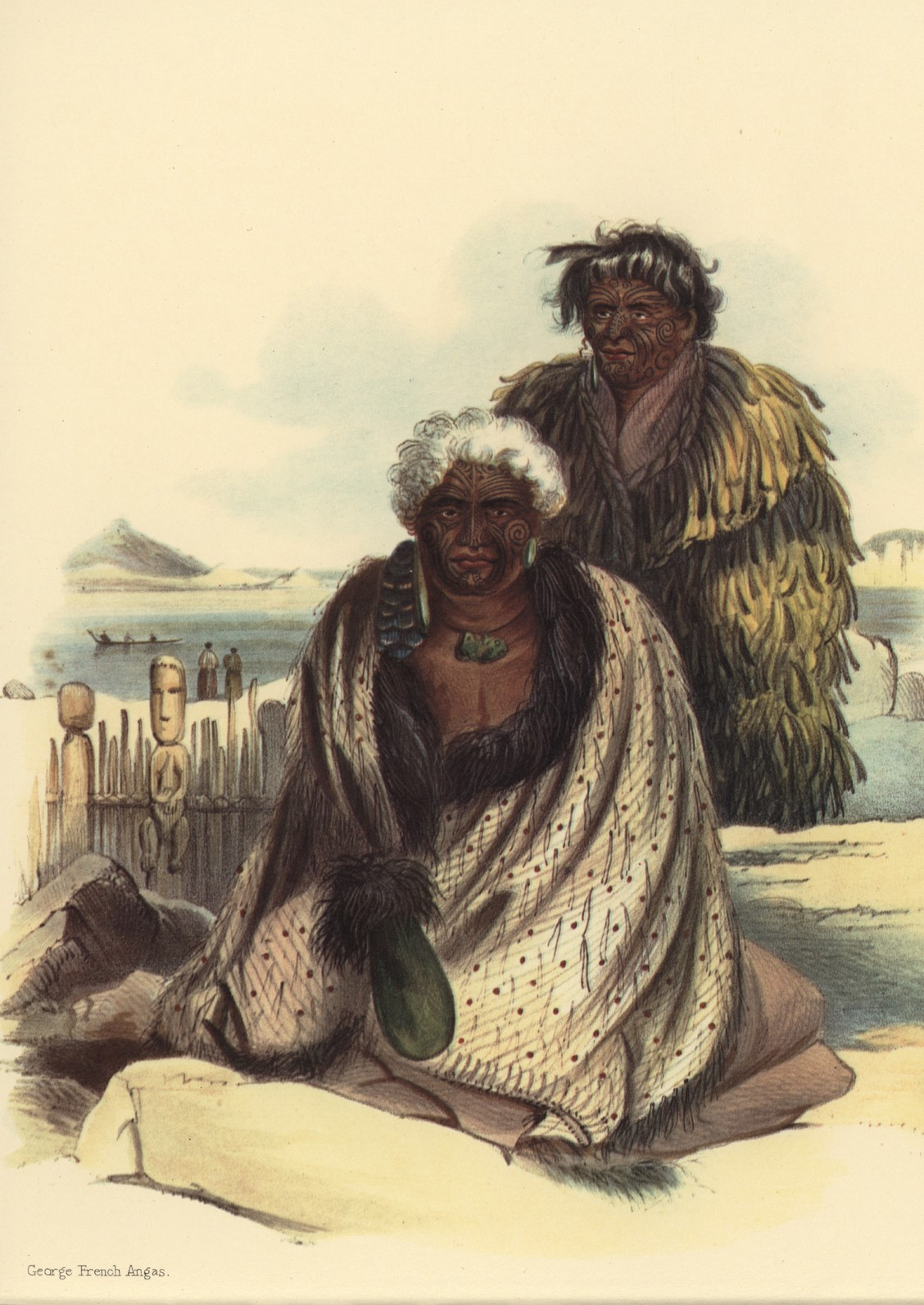
Mananui Te Heuheu Tūkino II (seated) and Iwikau Te Heuheu Tūkino III (standing). From George Angas, The New Zealanders Illustrated (1847).

Mananui Te Heuheu Tūkino II (died 7 May 1846) was a New Zealand Māori tribal leader of the Ngāti Tūwharetoa iwi.

The eldest son of Herea Te Heuheu Tukino I and his first wife, Rangiaho of Ngāti Maniapoto, Mananui was born in Pamotumotu, King Country, near the Mangatutu Stream and was the second of the Te Heuheu line to assume the leadership of Ngāti Tūwharetoa. Mananui traced his ancestry to Tama-te-kapua, commander of Te Arawa canoe, and to its priest, Ngatoro-i-rangi. He was distantly related to Potatau Te Wherowhero of Waikato and Te Rauparaha of Ngāti Toa. He belonged to Ngāti Pehi (now Ngāti Turumakina), Ngāti Hukere and Ngāti Hinewai hapū, and in his youth lived at Pamotumotu.

Mananui led Ngāti Tūwharetoa in war against other tribes, including a war with Ngāti Maru from about 1822 to 1832.

On the morning of 7 May 1846, an avalanche of mud descended from Hipaua Hill at the back of Te Rapa pā, and overwhelmed Te Heuheu, his six wives, his eldest son, Tamati Waka, and fifty-four others. Only two people who were in the pā survived. The pā is buried under 10 feet (3.0 m) of mud. The cause of the calamity was heavy rain three days earlier, which had caused small landslides that blocked a small valley partway up Hipaua Hill. Water from the rains and from hot springs at the top of the valley built up behind the barrier, until it burst, creating a great avalanche of thick mud and large masses of stone, which buried the pā. The Rev. Richard Taylor was present on 1 July 1846 at the tangihanga for Te Heuheu.

Mananui was succeeded by his brother Iwikau Te Heuheu Tūkino III in 1846 and was the father of Te Heuheu Tūkino IV who assumed the leadership of Ngāti Tūwharetoa in October 1862 following the death of his uncle Iwikau.

== Bibliography ==
- Grace, John Te Herekiekie (1970) [1959]. Tuwharetoa: The history of the Maori people of the Taupo District. Auckland [N.Z.]: A.H. & A.W. Reed. ISBN 9780589003739.
