= Tokaanu =

Small settlement close to Tūrangi, New Zealand

Coordinates: 38°57′58″S 175°46′05″E

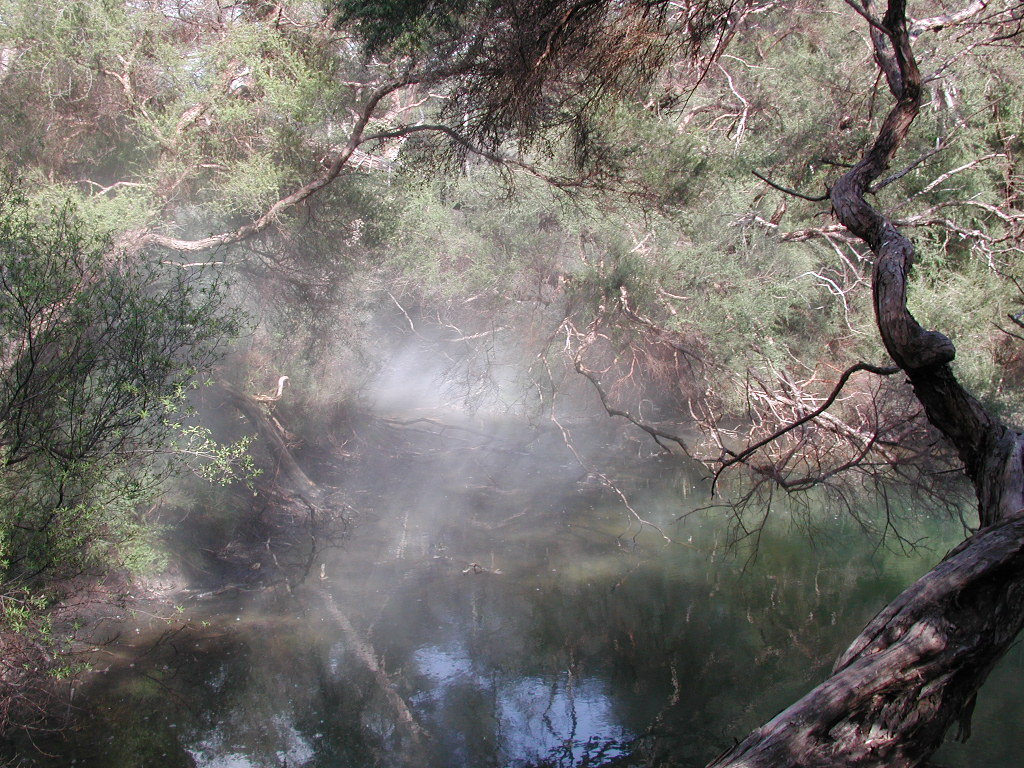
Sunlit steaming pond in Tokaanu thermal area

Tokaanu is a small settlement close to Tūrangi at the southern end of Lake Taupō.

The Tokaanu Thermal Pools and the easy access to Lake Taupō make it a popular lakeside holiday destination. A short walking track through the Tokaanu thermal area leads past steaming hot mineral pools and small mud pools dotted amongst the native bush. To the east of Tokaanu, another short walking track leads up the 490m high Manganamu, an extinct lava dome.

Before the development of Tūrangi in the 1960s, Tokaanu was the main settlement at the southern end of Lake Taupō. It had been known to Māori for centuries for its natural thermal pools. The pools became a major stopover on the Grand Tour stage coach run from Wanganui to Taupō in the 1800s. Passengers arrived by stage coach from Waiouru, and departed by steam launch from the historic Tokaanu wharf onwards to Taupō.

The Tokaanu Power Station, the largest hydro dam in the Tongariro power scheme, was built in the area in the 1960s.

The local Tokaanu Marae and Puhaorangi meeting house is a meeting place of the Ngāti Tūwharetoa hapū of Ngāti Kurauia.

Tokaanu is part of the Lake Taupo Bays statistical area.
