= Motutere, New Zealand =

Coordinates: 38°53′15″S 175°57′30″E

Motutere is a small township on the southeastern shore of Lake Taupō in New Zealand's Waikato region. It lies on Motutere Bay, close to the popular diving location, Te Poporo / Bulli Point, and approximately halfway between Taupō and Tūrangi, to both of which it is connected by SH1.

In the 18th century, the township was the base of Te Rangi-tua-mātotoru, the paramount chief of Ngāti Tūwharetoa.

Motutere is dominated by a camping site, one of the main spots for caravan camping along the shores of the lake. A popular short walking track, Waipehi Walk, begins at the settlement and offers views across the lake.
