= Kinloch, New Zealand =

Settlement in Waikato, New Zealand

Kinloch
- Town
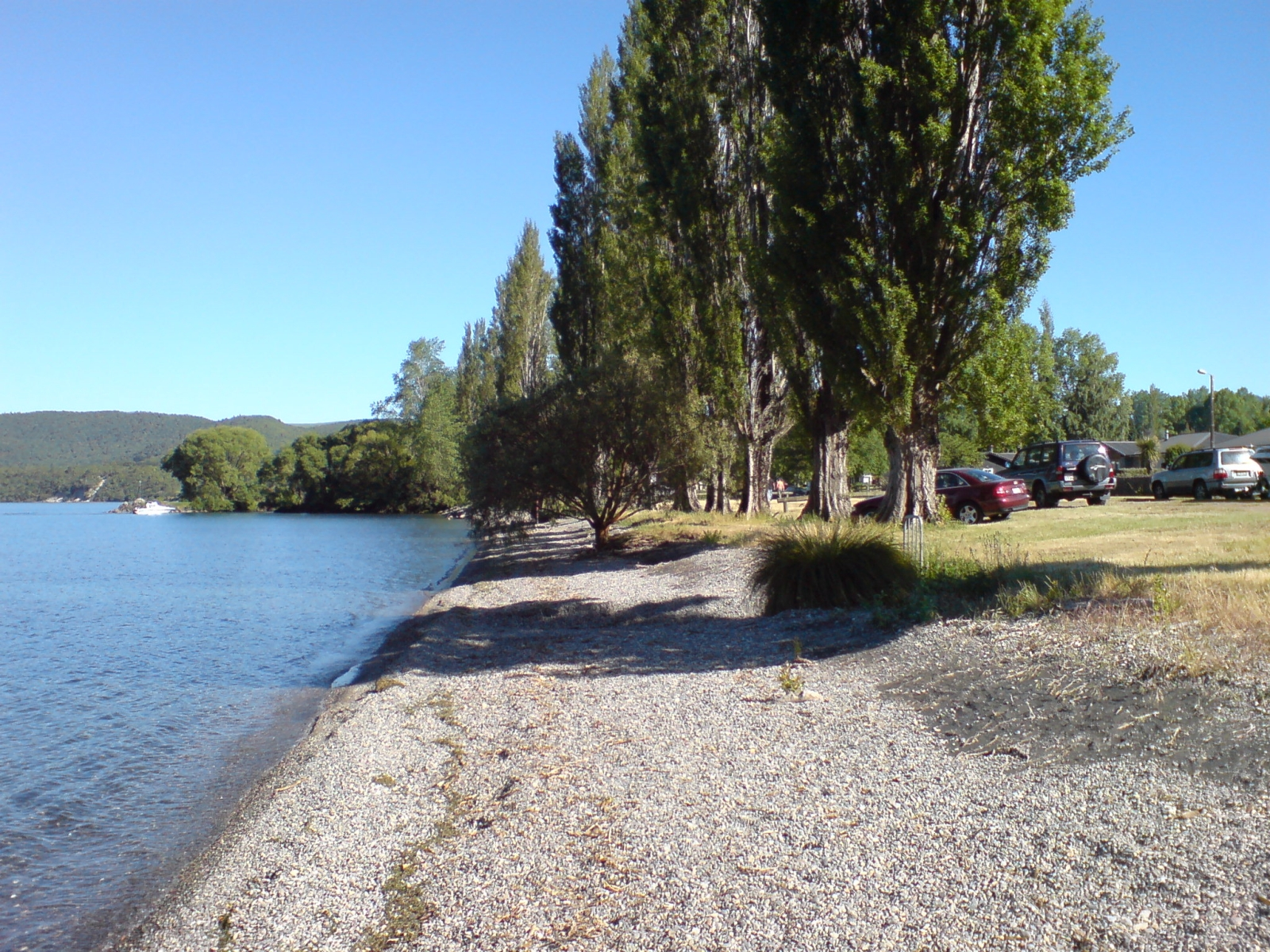
- The lakeshore of Lake Taupō at Kinloch
- Interactive map of Kinloch
- Coordinates: 38°39′S 175°55′E
- Country: New Zealand
- Region: Waikato region
- District: Taupō District
- Ward: Taupō General Ward
- Electorates: Taupō; Waiariki (Māori)
- Settlements of Taupō: List: Taupō; Kinloch; Tūrangi; Mangakino

Government
  - Territorial Authority: Taupō District Council
  - Regional council: Waikato Regional Council
  - Mayor of Taupō: John Funnell
  - Taupō MP: Louise Upston
  - Waiariki MP: Rawiri Waititi

Area
  - Total: 4.64 km^{2} (1.79 sq mi)

Population (June 2025)
  - Total: 1,270
  - Density: 274/km^{2} (709/sq mi)

Kinloch (from Scottish Gaelic: Ceann Loch) is a small town on the most northerly bay of Lake Taupō, 20 kilometres (12 mi) by road northwest of Taupō on the North Island Volcanic Plateau of New Zealand. It is in the Waikato region.

== History ==
Sir Keith Holyoake, then the Deputy Prime Minister and Minister of Agriculture of New Zealand, purchased the land in 1953 in partnership with his friend Theodore Nisbet Gibbs and Gibbs' son Ian. The land, which had been purchased from Ngāti Tūwharetoa iwi in 1884, was a block of 5,385 acres largely covered in scrub and fern. In 1956 Holyoake's son purchased an additional 769-acre block of land to the west of the existing block, with additional lake frontage, from the Ngāti Tūwharetoa iwi. The land was originally named Whangamatā Station, but the town was renamed Kinloch partly to distinguish it from Whangamatā in the Bay of Plenty.

Kinloch was developed into a holiday destination. The first sections were sold in 1959 for between NZ£550 to NZ£1500 each. The Kinloch marina was built in 1962.

The town was extended by a large subdivision called "Holy Oaks" to the northwest in 2001, despite opposition from local residents and concerns about environmental impacts held by local iwi.

In December 2018, new town signs were installed that misspelled the town's name as "Kinlock". Replacement signs were installed in January 2019.

In February 2021, a lakefront three-bedroom house sold for NZ$4.075 million, which was a record for the town.

In November 2022 public transport was introduced in Kinloch for the first time with the launch of the Connect2Taupō service, providing a weekly bus service from Kinloch to Taupō.

== Recreation and community ==
Kinloch has a mixture of permanent residents and holiday makers. In 2013, 70% of Kinloch's houses were classified as holiday homes. The lake is used for trout fishing, alongside water-skiing and wakeboarding. Walking and cycling tracks include the Kawakawa to Kinloch (K2K) track.

The Kinloch Club golf course was designed by Jack Nicklaus and opened in March 2007. In 2018 the course was ranked as the best 18-hole course in New Zealand by the New Zealand Professional Golfers Association. There is also a public 10-hole golf course located in Kinloch village.

Kinloch has a general store, and a café at the Kinloch Club golf course.

The Kinloch Triathlon has been held annually since 1985 and is New Zealand's longest running triathlon.

The Kinloch Volunteer Fire Brigade services the area. It is an auxiliary brigade meaning it is run by Taupō's fire brigade.

== Demographics ==
Statistics New Zealand describes Kinloch as a small urban area, which covers 4.64 km^{2} (1.79 sq mi). It had an estimated population of 1,270 as of June 2025, with a population density of 274 people per km^{2}.

Historical population for Kinloch
Year	Pop.	±% p.a.
2006	330	—
2013	489	+5.78%
2018	864	+12.06%
2023	1,191	+6.63%
The 2006 population is for a smaller area of 2.45 km^{2}. Source:

Kinloch had a population of 1,191 in the 2023 New Zealand census, an increase of 327 people (37.8%) since the 2018 census, and an increase of 702 people (143.6%) since the 2013 census. There were 579 males and 612 females in 492 dwellings. 2.0% of people identified as LGBTIQ+. The median age was 52.1 years (compared with 38.1 years nationally). There were 186 people (15.6%) aged under 15 years, 99 (8.3%) aged 15 to 29, 606 (50.9%) aged 30 to 64, and 303 (25.4%) aged 65 or older.

People could identify as more than one ethnicity. The results were 95.5% European (Pākehā); 11.3% Māori; 0.8% Pasifika; 1.5% Asian; 0.8% Middle Eastern, Latin American and African New Zealanders (MELAA); and 1.8% other, which includes people giving their ethnicity as "New Zealander". English was spoken by 98.0%, Māori by 2.5%, and other languages by 7.8%. No language could be spoken by 1.5% (e.g. too young to talk). New Zealand Sign Language was known by 0.3%. The percentage of people born overseas was 18.9, compared with 28.8% nationally.

Religious affiliations were 27.5% Christian, 0.3% Hindu, 0.5% Māori religious beliefs, 0.8% Buddhist, 0.3% New Age, and 0.8% other religions. People who answered that they had no religion were 63.2%, and 7.6% of people did not answer the census question.

Of those at least 15 years old, 246 (24.5%) people had a bachelor's or higher degree, 618 (61.5%) had a post-high school certificate or diploma, and 147 (14.6%) people exclusively held high school qualifications. The median income was $47,400, compared with $41,500 nationally. 189 people (18.8%) earned over $100,000 compared to 12.1% nationally. The employment status of those at least 15 was 504 (50.1%) full-time, 165 (16.4%) part-time, and 15 (1.5%) unemployed.

=== Mapara statistical area ===
Mapara statistical area surrounds but does not include Kinloch and covers 136.00 km^{2} (52.51 sq mi). It had an estimated population of 1,230 as of June 2025, with a population density of 9.0 people per km^{2}.

Historical population for Mapara
Year	Pop.	±% p.a.
2006	1,038	—
2013	885	−2.25%
2018	1,074	+3.95%
2023	1,179	+1.88%
The 2006 population does include Kinloch, and covers an area of 140.67 km^{2}. Source:

Mapara had a population of 1,179 in the 2023 New Zealand census, an increase of 105 people (9.8%) since the 2018 census, and an increase of 294 people (33.2%) since the 2013 census. There were 597 males, 585 females, and 3 people of other genders in 429 dwellings. 2.3% of people identified as LGBTIQ+. The median age was 44.1 years (compared with 38.1 years nationally). There were 228 people (19.3%) aged under 15 years, 162 (13.7%) aged 15 to 29, 585 (49.6%) aged 30 to 64, and 201 (17.0%) aged 65 or older.

People could identify as more than one ethnicity. The results were 93.9% European (Pākehā); 13.2% Māori; 0.5% Pasifika; 2.0% Asian; 0.5% Middle Eastern, Latin American and African New Zealanders (MELAA); and 2.0% other, which includes people giving their ethnicity as "New Zealander". English was spoken by 98.2%, Māori by 1.8%, and other languages by 4.6%. No language could be spoken by 1.3% (e.g. too young to talk). New Zealand Sign Language was known by 0.8%. The percentage of people born overseas was 15.3, compared with 28.8% nationally.

Religious affiliations were 23.7% Christian, 0.5% Hindu, 0.5% Māori religious beliefs, 0.5% Buddhist, 0.5% New Age, and 0.8% other religions. People who answered that they had no religion were 62.3%, and 11.5% of people did not answer the census question.

Of those at least 15 years old, 186 (19.6%) people had a bachelor's or higher degree, 612 (64.4%) had a post-high school certificate or diploma, and 153 (16.1%) people exclusively held high school qualifications. The median income was $49,100, compared with $41,500 nationally. 141 people (14.8%) earned over $100,000 compared to 12.1% nationally. The employment status of those at least 15 was 534 (56.2%) full-time, 174 (18.3%) part-time, and 15 (1.6%) unemployed.
