= Omori, New Zealand =

Settlement in Waikato, New Zealand

Omori
- Rural settlement
- Interactive map of Omori
- Coordinates: 38.901°S 175.761°E
- Country: New Zealand
- Region: Waikato region
- District: Taupō District
- Ward: Turangi-Tongariro General Ward
- Electorates: Taupō; Waiariki (Māori)

Government
  - Territorial Authority: Taupō District Council
  - Regional council: Waikato Regional Council
  - Mayor of Taupō: John Funnell
  - Taupō MP: Louise Upston
  - Waiariki MP: Rawiri Waititi

Area
  - Total: 2.98 km^{2} (1.15 sq mi)

Population (June 2025)
  - Total: 150
  - Density: 50/km^{2} (130/sq mi)

Omori is a small village north of Pukawa and south of Kuratau, on the western side of New Zealand's Lake Taupō. It is primarily a bach community.

A new jetty and boat ramp was built in 2012.

== Demographics ==
Statistics New Zealand describes Omori as a rural settlement, which covers 2.98 km^{2} (1.15 sq mi). It had an estimated population of 150 as of June 2025, with a population density of 50 people per km^{2}. The settlement is part of the larger Lake Taupō Bays statistical area.

Historical population
Year	Pop.	±% p.a.
2006	210	—
2013	96	−10.58%
2018	117	+4.04%
2023	138	+3.36%
The 2006 population is for a larger area of 6.09 km^{2}, including Pukawa. Source:

Omori had a population of 138 in the 2023 New Zealand census, an increase of 21 people (17.9%) since the 2018 census, and an increase of 42 people (43.8%) since the 2013 census. There were 72 males and 69 females in 78 dwellings. 2.2% of people identified as LGBTIQ+. The median age was 62.3 years (compared with 38.1 years nationally). There were 15 people (10.9%) aged under 15 years, 9 (6.5%) aged 15 to 29, 54 (39.1%) aged 30 to 64, and 60 (43.5%) aged 65 or older.

People could identify as more than one ethnicity. The results were 89.1% European (Pākehā), 21.7% Māori, and 4.3% Pasifika. English was spoken by 100.0%, Māori by 2.2%, and other languages by 4.3%. The percentage of people born overseas was 13.0, compared with 28.8% nationally.

Religious affiliations were 30.4% Christian, 4.3% Māori religious beliefs, and 2.2% New Age. People who answered that they had no religion were 60.9%, and 4.3% of people did not answer the census question.

Of those at least 15 years old, 21 (17.1%) people had a bachelor's or higher degree, 75 (61.0%) had a post-high school certificate or diploma, and 24 (19.5%) people exclusively held high school qualifications. The median income was $33,000, compared with $41,500 nationally. 15 people (12.2%) earned over $100,000 compared to 12.1% nationally. The employment status of those at least 15 was 45 (36.6%) full-time and 15 (12.2%) part-time.
