= Mangakino =

Settlement in Waikato, New Zealand

- Town
- Interactive map of Mangakino
- Coordinates: 38°22′10″S 175°46′30″E
- Country: New Zealand
- Region: Waikato region
- District: Taupō District
- Ward: Mangakino-Pouakani General Ward
- Electorates: Taupō; Te Tai Hauāuru (Māori)
- Settlements of Taupo: List: Taupō; Kinloch; Tūrangi; Mangakino

Government
  - Territorial Authority: Taupō District Council
  - Regional council: Waikato Regional Council
  - Mayor of Taupō: John Funnell
  - Taupō MP: Louise Upston
  - Hauraki-Waikato MP: Hana-Rawhiti Maipi-Clarke

Area
  - Total: 3.21 km^{2} (1.24 sq mi)

Population (June 2025)
  - Total: 860
  - Density: 270/km^{2} (690/sq mi)

Mangakino is a small town on the banks of the Waikato River in the North Island of New Zealand. It is located close to the hydroelectric power station at Lake Maraetai, 85 kilometres (53 mi) southeast of Hamilton. The town and its infrastructure are administered as the Mangakino Pouakani ward by the Taupō District Council.

== History and culture ==
In 1896, (after 40 years of resistance) the British Crown acquired the Wairarapa Lakes from Ngāti Kahungunu and in 1915, gave in return land in middle North Island, land known as part of the Pouakani Block. At that time the land where Mangakino lies today was described as native bush and pumice wastelands, barren, unoccupied and unfarmed. In 1946, as the Karapiro Dam neared completion, workers were to transfer to the next dam construction site – 'Maraetai I', near Mangakino. The Crown, under the Public Works Act, reacquired a portion of the unoccupied Pouakani Block alongside the Waikato River to build a "hydroelectric station" and a temporary township, Mangakino, was established to house the hundreds of construction workers needed. The town was only ever meant to be there on a temporary basis until the completion of the proposed dams.

The city planner Ernst Plischke who emigrated from Austria in 1939 developed a plan for the town centre of Mangakino, which was put into action in 1947–1948. His plan included a pedestrian area in the town centre free from through traffic.

In 1952 the population exceeded 5,000. Mangakino also serviced the construction of Ātiamuri and Ohakuri hydro schemes further upstream which were commissioned in 1959 and 1961 respectively. Mangakino and to a lesser extent Whakamaru and Ātiamuri, owe their existence to the hydro schemes and the roads constructed gave access which allowed development of the land for farming in the 1960s. The decline for Mangakino occurred after the hydro dams were commissioned and over time communities such as Maraetai and Waipapa disappeared altogether.

In 2001, the Mangakino Township Incorporation obtained approval through the Māori Land Court to legally change the title of the majority of residential sections in Mangakino from Māori land to General title. They then put Mangakino’s 500+ leasehold sections on the market as a single purchase. In July 2002, the majority of the town’s sections were sold to MV Properties of Pukekohe. A stipulation of the tender was that residents would be given the first opportunity to purchase their perpetually leased sections. The land valuations that had been exceedingly low for decades, then skyrocketed. Some locals chose to freehold their homes immediately, empty sections without current leases were sold on the open market. Many residents continue to remain perpetual leaseholders.

=== Marae ===
Pouākani Marae and its meeting house, Tamatea Pokai Whenua, is a meeting place for Ngāti Kahungunu ki Wairarapa. The marae was first built in 1972 on land exchanged for Lake Wairarapa for Ngāti Kahungunu ki Wairarapa members and other Māori who were working on the dam. The marae was destroyed by arson in 2007 but reopened in 2012 after five years of reconstruction.

In October 2020, the Government committed $4,525,105 from the Provincial Growth Fund to upgrade Pouākani Marae and 9 other marae, creating 35 jobs.

Miringa te Kakara Marae and Te Whetū Marama o Ngā Tau o Hinawa meeting house are a meeting place of Ngāti Maniapoto and Rereahu.

== Demographics ==
Statistics New Zealand describes Mangakino as a rural settlement, which covers 3.21 km^{2} (1.24 sq mi). It had an estimated population of 860 as of June 2025, with a population density of 268 people per km^{2}. The settlement is part of the larger Marotiri statistical area.

Historical population
Year	Pop.	±% p.a.
2006	1,020	—
2013	741	−4.46%
2018	831	+2.32%
2023	822	−0.22%

Mangakino had a population of 822 in the 2023 New Zealand census, a decrease of 9 people (−1.1%) since the 2018 census, and an increase of 81 people (10.9%) since the 2013 census. There were 417 males and 405 females in 369 dwellings. 2.2% of people identified as LGBTIQ+. The median age was 50.7 years (compared with 38.1 years nationally). There were 132 people (16.1%) aged under 15 years, 108 (13.1%) aged 15 to 29, 366 (44.5%) aged 30 to 64, and 213 (25.9%) aged 65 or older.

People could identify as more than one ethnicity. The results were 56.9% European (Pākehā); 52.2% Māori; 3.6% Pasifika; 3.3% Asian; 0.7% Middle Eastern, Latin American and African New Zealanders (MELAA); and 2.6% other, which includes people giving their ethnicity as "New Zealander". English was spoken by 97.1%, Māori by 13.5%, and other languages by 3.6%. No language could be spoken by 1.5% (e.g. too young to talk). The percentage of people born overseas was 12.4, compared with 28.8% nationally.

Religious affiliations were 24.8% Christian, 0.7% Hindu, 8.8% Māori religious beliefs, 0.4% Buddhist, 0.4% New Age, and 0.7% other religions. People who answered that they had no religion were 51.5%, and 12.0% of people did not answer the census question.

Of those at least 15 years old, 51 (7.4%) people had a bachelor's or higher degree, 378 (54.8%) had a post-high school certificate or diploma, and 264 (38.3%) people exclusively held high school qualifications. The median income was $26,000, compared with $41,500 nationally. 21 people (3.0%) earned over $100,000 compared to 12.1% nationally. The employment status of those at least 15 was 234 (33.9%) full-time, 87 (12.6%) part-time, and 33 (4.8%) unemployed.

== Education ==
Mangakino School is a co-educational Year 1–8 state primary school, with a roll of 50 as of July 2026. It opened in 1946, and Mangakino District High School opened in 1948. The two were merged into Mangakino Area School in 1994. It became a full primary school at the beginning of 2019.

== Notable residents ==
Prominent former citizens of Mangakino include:

- Willie Apiata VC, who was born there in 1972
- Mike Rann, Australian Ambassador and former Labor Premier of South Australia
- Ron Rangi, former All Black
- Sir Basil Arthur, former Minister of Transport, Labour Government.
- Hori Ahipene, actor
- Annabel Langbein, celebrity cook and food writer, born there in 1958
- Jimmy Hunter, former New Zealand football international. New Zealand team captain in 1954 while playing for Mangakino United.
