= Pukawa =

Settlement in Waikato, New Zealand

- Rural locality
- Wharenui, Manunui-a-Ruakapanga Marae
- Interactive map of Pukawa
- Coordinates: 38°55.0′S 175°45.3′E
- Country: New Zealand
- Region: Waikato region
- District: Taupō District
- Ward: Turangi-Tongariro General Ward
- Electorates: Taupō; Waiariki (Māori)

Government
  - Territorial Authority: Taupō District Council
  - Regional council: Waikato Regional Council
  - Mayor of Taupō: John Funnell
  - Taupō MP: Louise Upston
  - Waiariki MP: Rawiri Waititi

Area
  - Total: 0.78 km^{2} (0.30 sq mi)

Population (June 2025)
  - Total: 60
  - Density: 77/km^{2} (200/sq mi)
- Postcode(s): 3381

Pukawa or Pukawa Bay (Māori: Pūkawa) is a bay and a small township on the southern shores of Lake Taupō on New Zealand's North Island. It is off State Highway 41 between Turangi and Taumarunui, in the Taupō District and Waikato region.

== Marae ==
It is home of the Ngāti Tūwharetoa hapū of Ngāti Manunui, who established the Pūkawa Marae and Manunui a Ruakapanga meeting house in November 2006. The opening ceremony was attended by Tūheitia Paki, the Māori King.

Pōtatau Te Wherowhero was formally selected as king by a conference of chiefs of the Māori tribes held at Pukawa in April 1857 and was crowned during elaborate ceremonies held at his marae in Ngāruawāhia in April 1858.

In 1906 Ngāti Tūwharetoa and the Tongariro Timber Company struck an agreement for the construction of a 40-mile railway line from Kakahi (on the main trunk line) to Pukawa. This line was never completed.

== Demographics ==
Statistics New Zealand describes Pukawa as a rural settlement, which includes Oreti and covers 0.78 km^{2} (0.30 sq mi). It had an estimated population of 60 as of June 2025, with a population density of 77 people per km^{2}. The settlement is part of the larger Lake Taupo Bays statistical area.

Historical population for the settlement
Year	Pop.	±% p.a.
2006	210	—
2013	36	−22.27%
2018	48	+5.92%
2023	57	+3.50%
The 2006 population is for a larger area of 6.09 km^{2}, including Ōmori. Source:

Pukawa had a population of 57 in the 2023 New Zealand census, an increase of 9 people (18.8%) since the 2018 census, and an increase of 21 people (58.3%) since the 2013 census. There were 27 males and 33 females in 45 dwellings. 5.3% of people identified as LGBTIQ+. The median age was 61.2 years (compared with 38.1 years nationally). There were 6 people (10.5%) aged under 15 years, 3 (5.3%) aged 15 to 29, 27 (47.4%) aged 30 to 64, and 24 (42.1%) aged 65 or older.

People could identify as more than one ethnicity. The results were 73.7% European (Pākehā), 31.6% Māori, 5.3% Pasifika, and 10.5% other, which includes people giving their ethnicity as "New Zealander". English was spoken by 100.0%, Māori by 15.8%, and other languages by 5.3%. No language could be spoken by 5.3% (e.g. too young to talk). The percentage of people born overseas was 10.5, compared with 28.8% nationally.

Religious affiliations were 31.6% Christian, 5.3% Māori religious beliefs, and 5.3% Buddhist. People who answered that they had no religion were 52.6%, and 5.3% of people did not answer the census question.

Of those at least 15 years old, 24 (47.1%) people had a bachelor's or higher degree, 30 (58.8%) had a post-high school certificate or diploma, and 9 (17.6%) people exclusively held high school qualifications. The median income was $39,400, compared with $41,500 nationally. 6 people (11.8%) earned over $100,000 compared to 12.1% nationally. The employment status of those at least 15 was 18 (35.3%) full-time and 6 (11.8%) part-time.

=== Lake Taupō Bays statistical area ===
The statistical area of Lake Taupō Bays covers 1,154.30 km^{2} (445.68 sq mi) to the south and west of Lake Taupō. It includes Whareroa Village, Kuratau, Ōmori, Motuoapa, and Tauranga Taupō, and surrounds but does not include Tūrangi. It had an estimated population of 1,920 as of June 2025, with a population density of 1.7 people per km^{2}.

Historical population for Lake Taupō Bays
Year	Pop.	±% p.a.
2006	1,620	—
2013	1,578	−0.37%
2018	1,566	−0.15%
2023	1,854	+3.43%

Lake Taupō Bays had a population of 1,854 in the 2023 New Zealand census, an increase of 288 people (18.4%) since the 2018 census, and an increase of 276 people (17.5%) since the 2013 census. There were 963 males, 891 females, and 3 people of other genders in 837 dwellings. 1.9% of people identified as LGBTIQ+. The median age was 51.4 years (compared with 38.1 years nationally). There were 297 people (16.0%) aged under 15 years, 228 (12.3%) aged 15 to 29, 807 (43.5%) aged 30 to 64, and 522 (28.2%) aged 65 or older.

People could identify as more than one ethnicity. The results were 71.7% European (Pākehā); 43.5% Māori; 3.2% Pasifika; 1.5% Asian; 0.3% Middle Eastern, Latin American and African New Zealanders (MELAA); and 3.2% other, which includes people giving their ethnicity as "New Zealander". English was spoken by 97.6%, Māori by 15.0%, Samoan by 0.2%, and other languages by 3.4%. No language could be spoken by 1.8% (e.g. too young to talk). New Zealand Sign Language was known by 0.6%. The percentage of people born overseas was 11.2, compared with 28.8% nationally.

Religious affiliations were 28.8% Christian, 9.7% Māori religious beliefs, 0.3% Buddhist, 0.6% New Age, 0.2% Jewish, and 1.1% other religions. People who answered that they had no religion were 51.0%, and 8.7% of people did not answer the census question.

Of those at least 15 years old, 288 (18.5%) people had a bachelor's or higher degree, 918 (59.0%) had a post-high school certificate or diploma, and 357 (22.9%) people exclusively held high school qualifications. The median income was $34,800, compared with $41,500 nationally. 120 people (7.7%) earned over $100,000 compared to 12.1% nationally. The employment status of those at least 15 was 654 (42.0%) full-time, 234 (15.0%) part-time, and 42 (2.7%) unemployed.

== Pukawa School ==
A native school run by the Church of England was operating in Pukawa in 1862, but closed by January 1863 after four boys drowned and there was a shortage of food.

== Notable people ==
- Bessie Te Wenerau Grace, teacher, first Māori woman university graduate
