= Whareroa Village =

Settlement in Waikato, New Zealand

- Rural settlement
- Interactive map of Whareroa Village
- Coordinates: 38.860°S 175.779°E
- Country: New Zealand
- Region: Waikato region
- District: Taupō District
- Ward: Turangi-Tongariro General Ward
- Electorates: Taupō; Waiariki (Māori)

Government
  - Territorial Authority: Taupō District Council
  - Regional council: Waikato Regional Council
  - Mayor of Taupō: John Funnell
  - Taupō MP: Louise Upston
  - Waiariki MP: Rawiri Waititi

Area
  - Total: 0.32 km^{2} (0.12 sq mi)

Population (June 2025)
  - Total: 50
  - Density: 160/km^{2} (400/sq mi)

Whareroa Village is a small community north of Kuratau, on Te Hape Bay on the western side of New Zealand's Lake Taupō. Whareroa Stream runs into the lake immediately north of the community.

A Ngāti Parekāwa pā or village was at Whareroa during the period from 1830 to 1880, and likely much earlier. By 1965, there were only a few baches which were built about 60 years earlier. The subdivision of Whareroa Village began in the 1960s.

A plan to develop the north side of the stream, Whareroa North has not as of 2025 been implemented.

== Demographics ==
Statistics New Zealand describes Whareroa Village as a rural settlement, which covers 0.32 km^{2} (0.12 sq mi). It had an estimated population of 50 as of June 2025, with a population density of 156 people per km^{2}. The settlement is part of the larger Lake Taupō Bays statistical area.

Historical population
Year	Pop.	±% p.a.
2013	36	—
2018	36	+0.00%
2023	45	+4.56%

Whareroa Village had a population of 45 in the 2023 New Zealand census, an increase of 9 people (25.0%) since the 2018 census, and an increase of 9 people (25.0%) since the 2013 census. There were 24 males and 21 females in 27 dwellings. The median age was 68.2 years (compared with 38.1 years nationally). There were 18 people (40.0%) aged 30 to 64, and 30 (66.7%) aged 65 or older.

People could identify as more than one ethnicity. All those responding were European (Pākehā). English was spoken by 100.0%, and other languages by 6.7%. New Zealand Sign Language was known by 6.7%. The percentage of people born overseas was 13.3, compared with 28.8% nationally.

The sole religious affiliation given was 60.0% Christian. People who answered that they had no religion were 33.3%, and 6.7% of people did not answer the census question.

Of those at least 15 years old, 12 (26.7%) people had a bachelor's or higher degree, 33 (73.3%) had a post-high school certificate or diploma, and 6 (13.3%) people exclusively held high school qualifications. The median income was $33,900, compared with $41,500 nationally. 3 people (6.7%) earned over $100,000 compared to 12.1% nationally. The employment status of those at least 15 was 15 (33.3%) full-time, 3 (6.7%) part-time, and 3 (6.7%) unemployed.
