= Waitahanui =

Settlement in Waikato, New Zealand

- Village
- Interactive map of Waitahanui
- Coordinates: 38.794°S 176.076°E
- Country: New Zealand
- Region: Waikato region
- District: Taupō District
- Ward: Taupō General Ward
- Electorates: Taupō; Waiariki (Māori)

Government
  - Territorial Authority: Taupō District Council
  - Regional council: Waikato Regional Council
  - Mayor of Taupō: John Funnell
  - Taupō MP: Louise Upston
  - Waiariki MP: Rawiri Waititi

Area
  - Total: 5.30 km^{2} (2.05 sq mi)

Population (June 2025)
  - Total: 600
  - Density: 110/km^{2} (290/sq mi)
- Postcode(s): 3378

Waitahanui is a village in the Taupō District, Waikato region, New Zealand. The village is on the eastern shore of Lake Taupō, 14 km (9 mi) south of the district seat of Taupō.

Waitahanui Marae and Pākira meeting house is a meeting place for the Ngāti Tūwharetoa hapū (subtribe) of Ngāti Hinerau and Ngāti Tutemohuta. The Waitahanui Bridge site is also a meeting place for the Ngāti Tūwharetoa hapū.

== Demographics ==
Statistics New Zealand describes Five Mile Bay-Waitahanui as a rural settlement, which covers 5.30 km^{2} (2.05 sq mi). It had an estimated population of 600 as of June 2025, with a population density of 113 people per km^{2}. The settlement is part of the larger Waitahanui statistical area.

Historical population for Five Mile Bay-Waitahanui
Year	Pop.	±% p.a.
2006	453	—
2013	402	−1.69%
2018	543	+6.20%
2023	579	+1.29%
The 2006 population is for a larger area of 14.72 km^{2}. Source:

Five Mile Bay-Waitahanui had a population of 579 in the 2023 New Zealand census, an increase of 36 people (6.6%) since the 2018 census, and an increase of 177 people (44.0%) since the 2013 census. There were 288 males, 285 females, and 3 people of other genders in 183 dwellings. 1.6% of people identified as LGBTIQ+. The median age was 43.1 years (compared with 38.1 years nationally). There were 114 people (19.7%) aged under 15 years, 84 (14.5%) aged 15 to 29, 258 (44.6%) aged 30 to 64, and 117 (20.2%) aged 65 or older.

People could identify as more than one ethnicity. The results were 48.7% European (Pākehā), 63.7% Māori, 5.2% Pasifika, 2.1% Asian, and 1.0% other, which includes people giving their ethnicity as "New Zealander". English was spoken by 93.8%, Māori by 26.4%, Samoan by 0.5%, and other languages by 2.6%. No language could be spoken by 1.6% (e.g. too young to talk). New Zealand Sign Language was known by 0.5%. The percentage of people born overseas was 7.8, compared with 28.8% nationally.

Religious affiliations were 23.3% Christian, 0.5% Hindu, 0.5% Islam, 24.9% Māori religious beliefs, 0.5% New Age, and 0.5% other religions. People who answered that they had no religion were 42.0%, and 8.3% of people did not answer the census question.

Of those at least 15 years old, 54 (11.6%) people had a bachelor's or higher degree, 258 (55.5%) had a post-high school certificate or diploma, and 147 (31.6%) people exclusively held high school qualifications. The median income was $33,200, compared with $41,500 nationally. 27 people (5.8%) earned over $100,000 compared to 12.1% nationally. The employment status of those at least 15 was 195 (41.9%) full-time, 63 (13.5%) part-time, and 15 (3.2%) unemployed.

=== Waitahanui statistical area ===
Waitahanui statistical area covers 120.64 km^{2} (46.58 sq mi) and had an estimated population of 870 as of June 2025, with a population density of 7.2 people per km^{2}.

Historical population for the statistical area
Year	Pop.	±% p.a.
2006	690	—
2013	642	−1.02%
2018	795	+4.37%
2023	846	+1.25%

Waitahanui statistical area had a population of 846 in the 2023 New Zealand census, an increase of 51 people (6.4%) since the 2018 census, and an increase of 204 people (31.8%) since the 2013 census. There were 426 males, 417 females, and 6 people of other genders in 270 dwellings. 1.4% of people identified as LGBTIQ+. The median age was 42.5 years (compared with 38.1 years nationally). There were 165 people (19.5%) aged under 15 years, 135 (16.0%) aged 15 to 29, 387 (45.7%) aged 30 to 64, and 159 (18.8%) aged 65 or older.

People could identify as more than one ethnicity. The results were 60.3% European (Pākehā); 50.4% Māori; 3.5% Pasifika; 1.4% Asian; 0.4% Middle Eastern, Latin American and African New Zealanders (MELAA); and 2.5% other, which includes people giving their ethnicity as "New Zealander". English was spoken by 95.0%, Māori by 19.1%, Samoan by 0.7%, and other languages by 2.5%. No language could be spoken by 1.8% (e.g. too young to talk). New Zealand Sign Language was known by 0.4%. The percentage of people born overseas was 8.9, compared with 28.8% nationally.

Religious affiliations were 24.5% Christian, 0.4% Hindu, 0.4% Islam, 17.4% Māori religious beliefs, 0.4% Buddhist, 0.4% New Age, and 1.1% other religions. People who answered that they had no religion were 47.5%, and 8.9% of people did not answer the census question.

Of those at least 15 years old, 87 (12.8%) people had a bachelor's or higher degree, 399 (58.6%) had a post-high school certificate or diploma, and 192 (28.2%) people exclusively held high school qualifications. The median income was $37,800, compared with $41,500 nationally. 57 people (8.4%) earned over $100,000 compared to 12.1% nationally. The employment status of those at least 15 was 321 (47.1%) full-time, 96 (14.1%) part-time, and 15 (2.2%) unemployed.

== Education ==
Te Kura o Waitahanui is a co-educational state Māori immersion school serving years 1 to 6, with a roll of 103 as of July 2026. The Waitahanui Native School started in 1905.
