= Wairakei =

Settlement in Waikato, New Zealand

- Rural locality
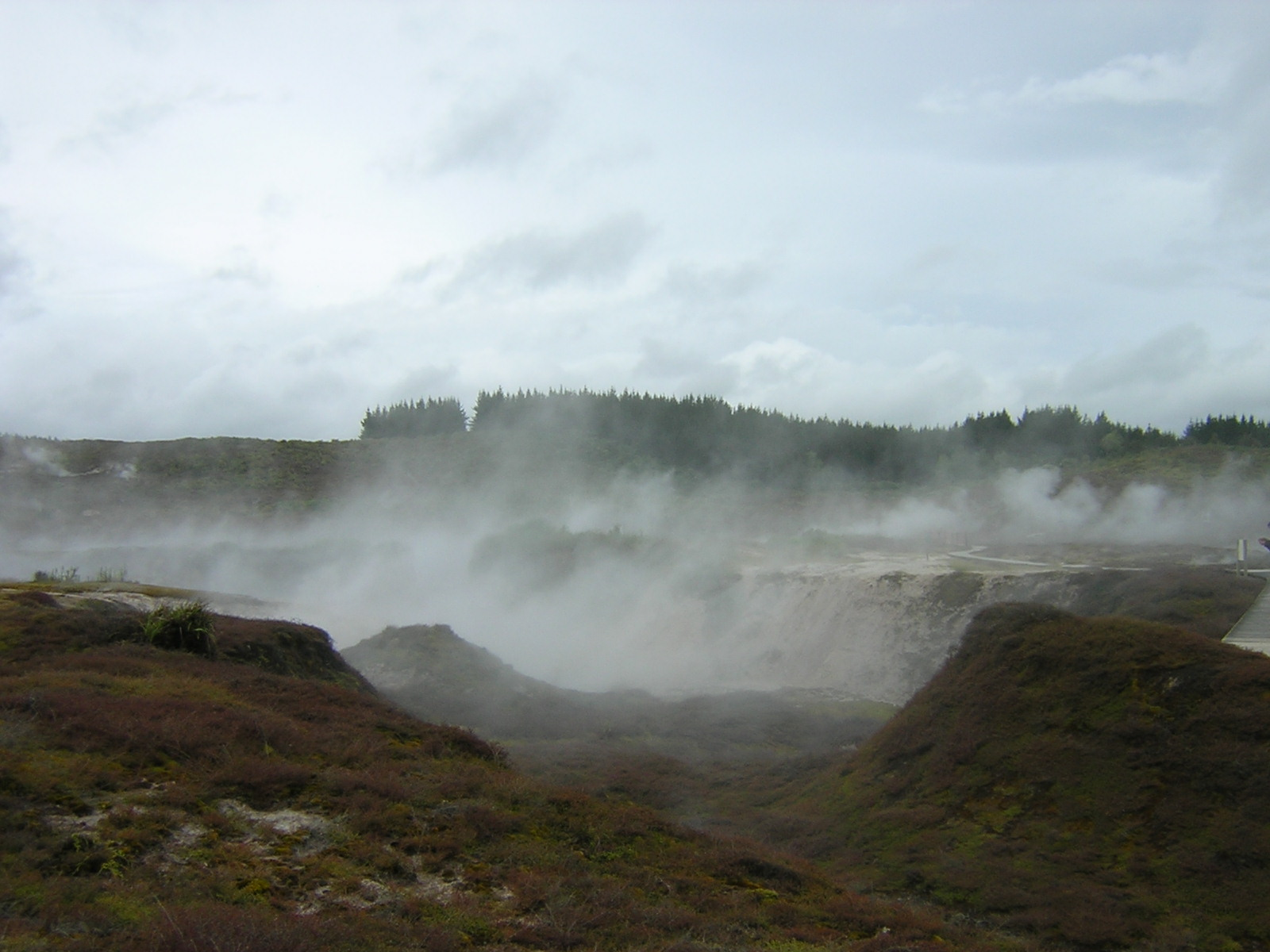
- The Craters of the Moon, a steamfield close by, created by the use of geothermal energy changing the underground pressure situation.
- Interactive map of Wairakei
- Coordinates: 38.619°S 176.103°E
- Country: New Zealand
- Region: Waikato region
- District: Taupō District
- Ward: Taupō East Rural General Ward
- Electorates: Taupō; Waiariki (Māori)

Government
  - Territorial Authority: Taupō District Council
  - Regional council: Waikato Regional Council
  - Mayor of Taupō: John Funnell
  - Taupō MP: Louise Upston
  - Waiariki MP: Rawiri Waititi

Area
  - Total: 0.36 km^{2} (0.14 sq mi)

Population (June 2025)
  - Total: 490
  - Density: 1,400/km^{2} (3,500/sq mi)
- Postcode(s): 3332

Wairakei is a small settlement and geothermal area 8-kilometres (5 mi) north of Taupō, in the centre of the North Island of New Zealand, on the Waikato River. It is part of the Taupō Volcanic Zone and features several natural geysers, hot pools, boiling mud pools, and the Wairakei Power Station, a major geothermal electric power generating station.

The station was the second large-scale geothermal facility worldwide, and was commissioned in 1958. It was listed in the book 70 Wonders Of The Modern World published in 2000 by Reader's Digest to record The Eventful 20th Century.

The settlement, referred to as Wairakei Village, was constructed to house the workers of both the power station and the neighbouring Aratiatia hydro power station.

From 31 October 2022 it had buses to Taupō, Mondays to Fridays.

== Demographics ==
Statistics New Zealand describes Wairakei Village as a rural settlement, which covers 0.36 km^{2} (0.14 sq mi). and had an estimated population of 490 as of June 2025, with a population density of 1,361 people per km^{2}. The settlement is part of the larger Wairakei-Broadlands statistical area.

Historical population for Wairakei Village
Year	Pop.	±% p.a.
2006	465	—
2013	453	−0.37%
2018	510	+2.40%
2023	480	−1.21%

Wairākei Village had a population of 480 in the 2023 New Zealand census, a decrease of 30 people (−5.9%) since the 2018 census, and an increase of 27 people (6.0%) since the 2013 census. There were 246 males, 234 females, and 3 people of other genders in 147 dwellings. 2.5% of people identified as LGBTIQ+. The median age was 32.4 years (compared with 38.1 years nationally). There were 123 people (25.6%) aged under 15 years, 93 (19.4%) aged 15 to 29, 222 (46.2%) aged 30 to 64, and 45 (9.4%) aged 65 or older.

People could identify as more than one ethnicity. The results were 71.9% European (Pākehā); 46.2% Māori; 3.1% Pasifika; 1.9% Asian; 1.2% Middle Eastern, Latin American and African New Zealanders (MELAA); and 2.5% other, which includes people giving their ethnicity as "New Zealander". English was spoken by 96.2%, Māori by 7.5%, Samoan by 0.6%, and other languages by 5.6%. No language could be spoken by 2.5% (e.g. too young to talk). New Zealand Sign Language was known by 1.2%. The percentage of people born overseas was 11.2, compared with 28.8% nationally.

Religious affiliations were 17.5% Christian, 0.6% Hindu, 5.6% Māori religious beliefs, and 1.2% New Age. People who answered that they had no religion were 63.8%, and 11.9% of people did not answer the census question.

Of those at least 15 years old, 30 (8.4%) people had a bachelor's or higher degree, 210 (58.8%) had a post-high school certificate or diploma, and 114 (31.9%) people exclusively held high school qualifications. The median income was $35,500, compared with $41,500 nationally. 18 people (5.0%) earned over $100,000 compared to 12.1% nationally. The employment status of those at least 15 was 189 (52.9%) full-time, 60 (16.8%) part-time, and 6 (1.7%) unemployed.

=== Wairakei-Broadlands statistical area ===
Wairakei-Broadlands statistical area covers 410.00 km^{2} (158.30 sq mi) and had an estimated population of 1,230 as of June 2025, with a population density of 3.0 people per km^{2}.

Historical population for Wairakei-Broadlands
Year	Pop.	±% p.a.
2006	1,092	—
2013	1,152	+0.77%
2018	1,236	+1.42%
2023	1,182	−0.89%

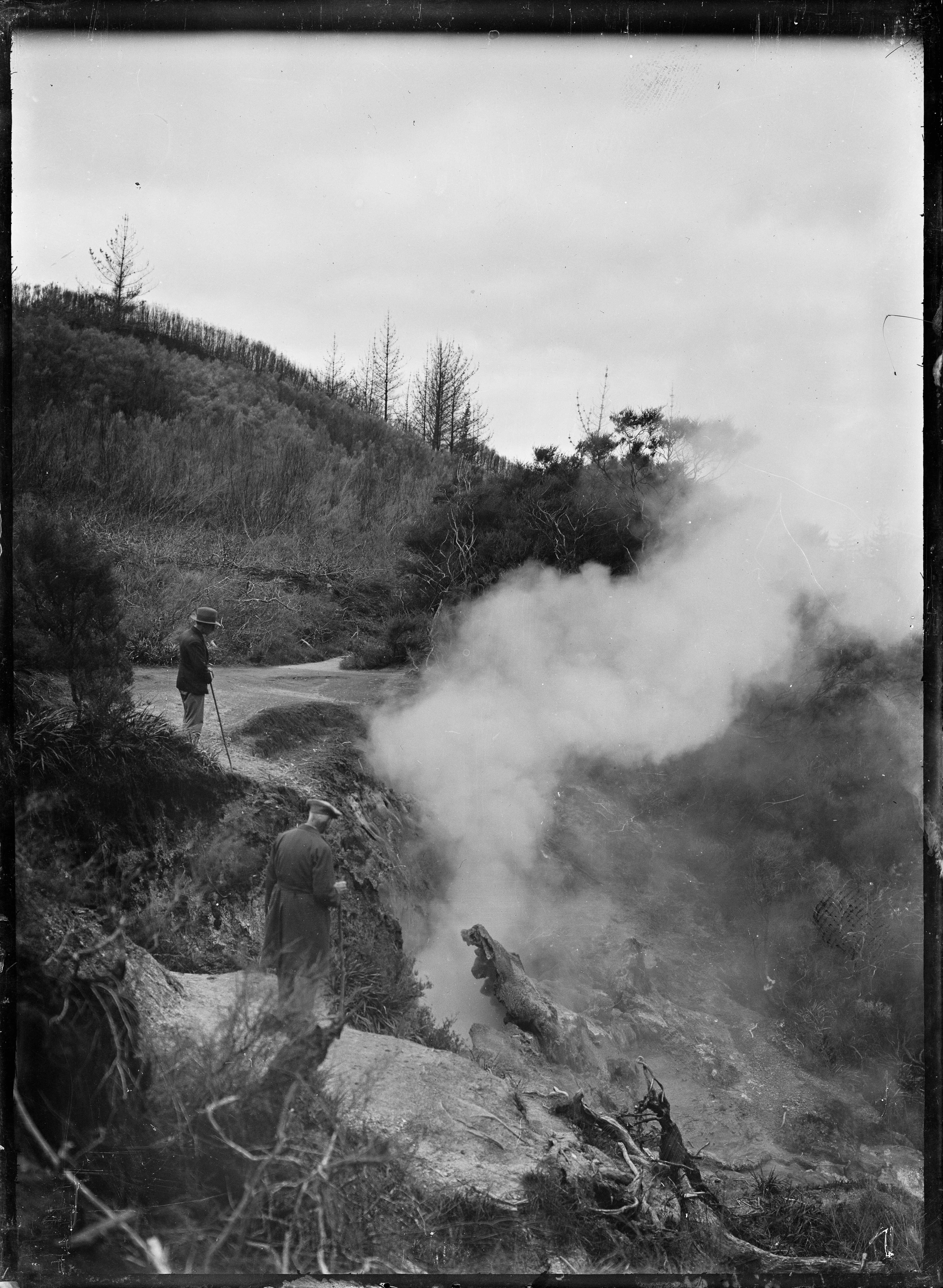
Dragon's Mouth geyser

Wairākei-Broadlands had a population of 1,182 in the 2023 New Zealand census, a decrease of 54 people (−4.4%) since the 2018 census, and an increase of 30 people (2.6%) since the 2013 census. There were 621 males, 558 females, and 3 people of other genders in 417 dwellings. 2.3% of people identified as LGBTIQ+. The median age was 35.1 years (compared with 38.1 years nationally). There were 258 people (21.8%) aged under 15 years, 216 (18.3%) aged 15 to 29, 567 (48.0%) aged 30 to 64, and 138 (11.7%) aged 65 or older.

People could identify as more than one ethnicity. The results were 77.7% European (Pākehā); 36.5% Māori; 2.8% Pasifika; 3.3% Asian; 1.0% Middle Eastern, Latin American and African New Zealanders (MELAA); and 2.0% other, which includes people giving their ethnicity as "New Zealander". English was spoken by 96.7%, Māori by 5.3%, Samoan by 0.3%, and other languages by 5.8%. No language could be spoken by 2.3% (e.g. too young to talk). New Zealand Sign Language was known by 0.8%. The percentage of people born overseas was 13.5, compared with 28.8% nationally.

Religious affiliations were 20.8% Christian, 0.8% Hindu, 3.6% Māori religious beliefs, 0.5% Buddhist, 0.8% New Age, and 1.0% other religions. People who answered that they had no religion were 62.2%, and 10.7% of people did not answer the census question.

Of those at least 15 years old, 105 (11.4%) people had a bachelor's or higher degree, 549 (59.4%) had a post-high school certificate or diploma, and 270 (29.2%) people exclusively held high school qualifications. The median income was $44,200, compared with $41,500 nationally. 78 people (8.4%) earned over $100,000 compared to 12.1% nationally. The employment status of those at least 15 was 540 (58.4%) full-time, 138 (14.9%) part-time, and 15 (1.6%) unemployed.

== Education ==
Wairakei School is a co-educational state primary school, with a roll of 334 as of July 2026. The school opened in 1959.

== Notable people ==
- Louise Rennison, lived here as a teenager

== Climate ==
Climate data for Wairakei (1962–1987 normals, extremes 1952–1988)
Month	Jan	Feb	Mar	Apr	May	Jun	Jul	Aug	Sep	Oct	Nov	Dec	Year
Record high °C (°F)	32.9 (91.2)	34.0 (93.2)	30.0 (86.0)	26.9 (80.4)	21.2 (70.2)	18.3 (64.9)	17.8 (64.0)	18.8 (65.8)	23.0 (73.4)	28.3 (82.9)	28.0 (82.4)	31.2 (88.2)	34.0 (93.2)
Mean daily maximum °C (°F)	23.5 (74.3)	23.7 (74.7)	21.7 (71.1)	18.4 (65.1)	14.4 (57.9)	11.9 (53.4)	11.4 (52.5)	12.5 (54.5)	14.3 (57.7)	16.8 (62.2)	19.2 (66.6)	21.6 (70.9)	17.5 (63.4)
Daily mean °C (°F)	16.9 (62.4)	16.9 (62.4)	15.4 (59.7)	12.2 (54.0)	9.0 (48.2)	6.8 (44.2)	6.3 (43.3)	7.3 (45.1)	9.1 (48.4)	11.2 (52.2)	13.3 (55.9)	15.5 (59.9)	11.7 (53.0)
Mean daily minimum °C (°F)	10.3 (50.5)	10.2 (50.4)	9.1 (48.4)	6.1 (43.0)	3.5 (38.3)	1.9 (35.4)	1.0 (33.8)	2.1 (35.8)	3.9 (39.0)	5.6 (42.1)	7.4 (45.3)	9.3 (48.7)	5.9 (42.6)
Record low °C (°F)	−0.5 (31.1)	−1.1 (30.0)	−2.6 (27.3)	−6.4 (20.5)	−5.9 (21.4)	−6.8 (19.8)	−7.0 (19.4)	−7.1 (19.2)	−6.6 (20.1)	−4.6 (23.7)	−3.2 (26.2)	−1.5 (29.3)	−7.1 (19.2)
Average rainfall mm (inches)	83.3 (3.28)	85.6 (3.37)	98.0 (3.86)	80.4 (3.17)	99.5 (3.92)	110.2 (4.34)	118.2 (4.65)	119.3 (4.70)	111.4 (4.39)	94.3 (3.71)	93.2 (3.67)	123.8 (4.87)	1,217.2 (47.93)
Source: NIWA
