= 1979 New Zealand bravery awards =

The 1979 New Zealand bravery awards were announced via a Special Honours List on 11 April 1979, and recognised four people for acts of bravery in 1978.

== Queen's Commendation for Brave Conduct ==
- James Aubrey Pierce – of Roxburgh; constable, New Zealand Police.

For services on the evening of 31 March 1978 when he apprehended an emotionally disturbed 24-year-old man who was in possession of a loaded firearm. During several violent struggles the firearm was discharged but without injury.

- Ian Richard Smith – of Russell; constable, New Zealand Police.

For disarming an emotionally disturbed man on the 23 August 1978.

- Jean Susan Donnelly – of Masterton.

For services on the 25 August 1978 when she went to the assistance of a woman who was being attacked by her husband who had the intention of killing her with an iron bar. Despite being injured by the man, Mrs Donnelly succeeded in wrestling the iron bar from him, thereby almost certainly saving the woman's life.

- Captain Peter William Nelson – Royal New Zealand Army Education Corps, Regular Force Cadet School, Waiouru.

On 8 November 1978, Captain Nelson was in charge of five Regular Force Cadets on a canoeing exercise on the Tongariro River. After disembarking from his canoe he noticed a cadet had capsized his canoe in a rapid, and was caught and held below the surface by a submerged obstacle. Captain Nelson dived into the rapid and on his second attempt succeeded in the rescue of the cadet who by then had no pulse and had stopped breathing. He applied mouth to mouth resuscitation and the cadet regained consciousness.
