= List of pools of the Tongariro River =

Uniquely among New Zealand rivers, the various pools and widenings of the Tongariro River and its marshy delta have been given specific names which are recognised as official by Land Information New Zealand (LINZ). The river, the main waterway of the Waikato River system above Lake Taupō in the central North Island, has over 40 named pools, the majority of which are close to the town of Tūrangi, at or immediately above the river's delta.

Lake	Area	Coordinates	Notes
Admirals Pool		39°00′39″S 175°48′50″E	Above Tūrangi.
Bain Pool		38°58′25″S 175°48′38″E	
Barlows Pool		39°01′05″S 175°48′39″E	
Beggs Pool		39°07′48″S 175°49′24″E	Considerably further up-river than the other named pools, close to the Waikato Falls.
Big Bend Pool		39°02′30″S 175°49′38″E	
Blue Pool		39°02′39″S 175°49′45″E	
Boulder Pool		39°02′29″S 175°49′32″E	
Breakaway Pool		39°02′25″S 175°49′21″E	
Breakfast Pool		38°59′54″S 175°48′47″E	Close to the town of Tūrangi.
Cattle Rustlers Pool		39°00′58″S 175°48′39″E	Above Tūrangi.
Cherry Pool		38°57′16″S 175°46′37″E	
Cliff Pool		39°02′20″S 175°49′21″E	
Cobham Pool		38°57′15″S 175°47′10″E	Within a large bend in the river 2 kilometres (1.2 mi) south of the mouth of the delta.
Dans Pool		38°56′45″S 175°46′40″E	On Maketu Island at the northern tip of the Tongariro delta.
DeLatours Pool		38°57′50″S 175°47′37″E	
Downs Pool		38°58′12″S 175°47′35″E	
Duchess Pool		39°01′42″S 175°49′00″E	
Fan Pool		39°02′26″S 175°49′32″E	
Fence Pool		39°03′09″S 175°50′11″E	Close to the river's junction with its tributary, the Whitikau Stream.
Graces Pool		38°57′40″S 175°47′50″E	
Hydro Pool		39°00′05″S 175°48′46″E	Close to the town of Tūrangi.
Island Pool		38°59′34″S 175°49′05″E	Close to the town of Tūrangi.
Jellicoe Pool		38°57′39″S 175°47′10″E	
Jones Pool		38°58′17″S 175°48′03″E	
Judges Pool		38°59′19″S 175°49′14″E	Close to the town of Tūrangi.
Kamahi Pool		39°00′28″S 175°48′40″E	Above Tūrangi.
Log Pool		38°58′22″S 175°48′22″E	
Lonely Pool		38°59′14″S 175°49′13″E	Close to the town of Tūrangi.
Lower Birch Pool		39°01′12″S 175°48′44″E	
Major Jones Pool		38°59′48″S 175°48′47″E	Close to the town of Tūrangi.
Never Fail Pool		39°00′23″S 175°48′44″E	Above Tūrangi.
Poplar Pool		38°57′15″S 175°47′40″E	
Poutu Pool		39°02′09″S 175°49′00″E	
Red Hut Pool		39°01′52″S 175°48′49″E	
Reed Pool		38°58′27″S 175°48′07″E	
Sand Pool		39°03′00″S 175°50′18″E	Close to the river's junction with its tributary, the Whitikau Stream.
Shag Pool		39°01′44″S 175°48′52″E	
Silly Pool		39°01′34″S 175°48′52″E	
Stag Pool		39°00′51″S 175°48′52″E	Above Tūrangi.
Swirl Pool		38°58′53″S 175°49′00″E	Close to the town of Tūrangi.
The Bends Pool		38°58′03″S 175°48′05″E	
The Rip		39°00′02″S 175°48′47″E	Close to the town of Tūrangi.
Upper Birch Pool		39°01′24″S 175°48′45″E	
Upper Island Pool		38°58′42″S 175°48′54″E	Close to the town of Tūrangi.
Waddells Pool		39°01′55″S 175°48′49″E	
Whitikau Pool		39°03′04″S 175°50′18″E	Close to the river's junction with its tributary, the Whitikau Stream.

== See also ==
- List of lakes of New Zealand
