= Kuratau Power Station =

- Location within New Zealand
- Country: New Zealand
- Location: Taupō District
- Coordinates: 38°52′46.1″S 175°44′8.1″E
- Purpose: Power
- Status: Operational
- Construction began: 1959
- Opening date: 1962
- Construction cost: £500,000
- Built by: Fletcher Construction
- Owners: King Country Electric Power Board; King Country Energy
- Operator: Trustpower

Dam and spillways
- Type of dam: Rock-fill
- Impounds: Kuratau River
- Height (foundation): 36 metres
- Length: 70 m (230 ft)
- Width (base): 118 m (387 ft)

Reservoir
- Creates: Lake Kuratau
- Surface area: Approximately 100 hectare

Kuratau Power Station
- Operator: Trustpower
- Commission date: 1962
- Type: Conventional
- Hydraulic head: 64 metres
- Turbines: Two x 3 MW
- Installed capacity: 6 MW (8,000 hp)
- Annual generation: 28 GWh (100 TJ)
- Website; King Country Energy

The Kuratau power station is a hydroelectric power facility in Kuratau on the western side of Lake Taupō in New Zealand which makes use of water from the Kuratau River. The river is impounded behind a dam to form Lake Kuratau before discharging through the power station back into the river. The scheme is operated by Trustpower on behalf of its owner King Country Energy.

== History ==
=== Development ===
In 1952 Lloyd Mandeno who was the consulting engineer to the King Country Electric Power Board suggested to the board that they consider building a power station. With demand and its revenues increasing (it increased by 1375% between 1948 and 1958), having its own generation would reduce the amount of power the board would have to purchase from the State Hydro-Electric Department (SHD), while also boosting industrial development in the board's area. The SHD was in 1958 renamed the New Zealand Electricity Department (NZED). Mandeno identified that Kakahi on the Whakapapa River would be a suitable location. However the SHD turned down the board's application for a licence to build a power station as they also intended to utilise the river to generate electricity in what later became the Tongariro Power Scheme.

Continuing his investigations Mandeno identified what he thought was another suitable site in a narrow gorge that could utilise the Kuratau River. The board authorised him to spend up to £400 on further investigations. Satisfied with Mandeno's conclusions, the board in August 1953 decided to apply for a generation licence and commenced discussions with the SHD to determine if they had any objections and with the Local Government Authorities Loan Board. The Loan Board was prepared to offer a 40-year loan, while the SHD indicated that it was prepared to buy any surplus power produced by the station.

Detailed design of the power station was then undertaken by consulting engineers Mandeno, Lee & Brown (of which Lloyd Mandeno was a principal).

Delays then occurred as it took time for the board to secure access to the proposed site to undertake detailed investigations as the land was part of a Māori development block that was jointly owned by several Māori families. Both them and the Department of Māori Affairs who were responsible for administering the block were concerned over how much valuable farming land was going to be lost and what compensation would be offered. Eventually, the amount of the compensation that board had to pay to the land owners had to be settled in court. As a result, it took until 1955 before the board was granted a licence to generate electricity at Kuratau.

Further delays then occurred with obtaining the generation equipment, which had to be imported. The station's output was to be distributed over 33 kV transmission lines which had to be built. While it was not the first such line in the board's area it was the first that they contracted out for construction and as such delays were incurred in obtaining some of the equipment that required.

After its construction loan was secured in 1959 tenders were issued for construction and supply of equipment. Fletchers Construction won the contract to undertake the civil works with a price of £295,000. English firm Boving & Co won the contract to supply the turbines and other hydraulic machinery, Swedish firm ASEA won the contract supply the generators, while local company Turnbull & Jones were awarded the contract to supply the control panels and install the electrical equipment. Fletcher Steel & Engineering won the contract to supply the steel for the penstocks, intake trash racks, control gates and the powerhouse structure.

An 8-km-long access road was created to a construction camp where several workshops, temporary accommodation, and three permanent staff houses were established on a bluff above where the power house was to be built. The nearest pub was however 26 km away which created issues for those in the workforce wanting to have a drink after work as this was during the days of the Six o'clock swill which meant the pub closed at 6 pm.

=== Construction ===
Construction began in 1959 under the management of Tony Campbell of Fletchers what was intended to be a 27.4-metre-high (90 ft) concrete arch dam which would convey the water via a short tunnel and canal to penstocks and hence down to the power house.

However, as excavation began it was found that sides of the narrow gorge in which the dam was being built were unstable, with a large amount of sand being encountered. This was a common issue on the volcanic soils of the central North Island and had been encountered on some of the power stations that had been built on the Waikato River. Digging continued, but it soon became obvious that it would be impossible to find any sound rock into which to anchor the abutments of the dam.

Mandeno, Lee & Brown quickly redesigned the power station to make use of another site 400 metres further upstream for which they designed a low rock-fill dam from which an open canal, penstocks and a surge chamber could convey the water to the powerhouse.

Once the dam was completed, the lake took one week to fill.

=== Commissioning ===
By early 1962 one penstock had been installed which allowed its associated generator to be commissioned and then commence commercial operation at midnight on 16 April 1962 and immediately began bringing in a potential revenue of £150 to 200 per day. A large crowd celebrated the official opening of the station on 25 May 1962.

The second generator entered service on 21 June 1962.

Following the completion of the work, the construction site was cleared during the middle of 1962, with all temporary construction buildings removed, after which the site was landscaped with 8,450 trees and 12 acres of new grass.

The construction of the power station cost £500,000.

=== Refurbishment and strengthening ===
In the 1980s the station was shut down while repairs and improvements were made. The canal was earthquake strengthened, fitted a with drainage system under the lining and relined with concrete and shotcrete to solve excessive leakage. At the same time erosion below the spillway was repaired with shotcrete, the fastening of the powerhouse's cladding was improved and the penstock supports were strengthened. Diversion banks were also added to control flooding in the event of the bursting of a penstock or the canal and the closing of the canal's intake gate during an earthquake was improved.

== Design ==
A 36-metre-tall by 118-metre-wide by 70-metre-long rock-fill dam impounds the Kuratau River to create Lake Kuratau, which covers approximately 100 hectares and gives a head of 64 metres. The dam is fitted with a spillway on its western side that can pass up to 110 cumecs down the empty bed of the river.

From the south eastern end of the lake a 495-metre-long canal which terminates in a forebay directs the water into two steel penstocks which lead to a surge chamber from which a further two steel penstocks, each 296 metres long convey the water down to a powerhouse located on Kuratau Hydro Rd, Omori. Inside the powerhouse are two 4,000 hp horizontal Boving & Co turbines. Each turbine is directly coupled to a 3 MW, 3 MVA horizontal ASEA three-phase generator.

The power station is embedded behind Transpower's Ongarue Substation, but can also be switched within The Lines Company network to either Transpower's National Park or Tokaanu substations.

== Operation ==
Operation of the power station is covered by the requirements of five resource consents which expire in December 2026.

As the power station is located in an area covered in pumice, the intake to the power station requires regular maintenance to remove the pumice which has become dislodged and then floats down the river to build up behind the dam.

Lake Kuratau is popular with a range of recreational users, including duck shooters and fly fishermen. The New Zealand Fly Fishing Association frequently uses the lake in its national competitions. In 2009 the lake was used for the Oceania Fly Fishing Championships.

Despite covering 100 hectare the lake which created in what is basically a long narrow flooded river valley has a relatively small volume. This means that for example at an inflow of about four cumecs the lake will be drained in between 36 and 48 hours if the station was operated at its full output.

The lake has a consented operating range of 2.61m which is typically not fully utilised during the station's day-to-day operation.

== See also ==
- Hydroelectric power in New Zealand
