= Kuratau =

Settlement in Waikato, New Zealand

- Rural settlement
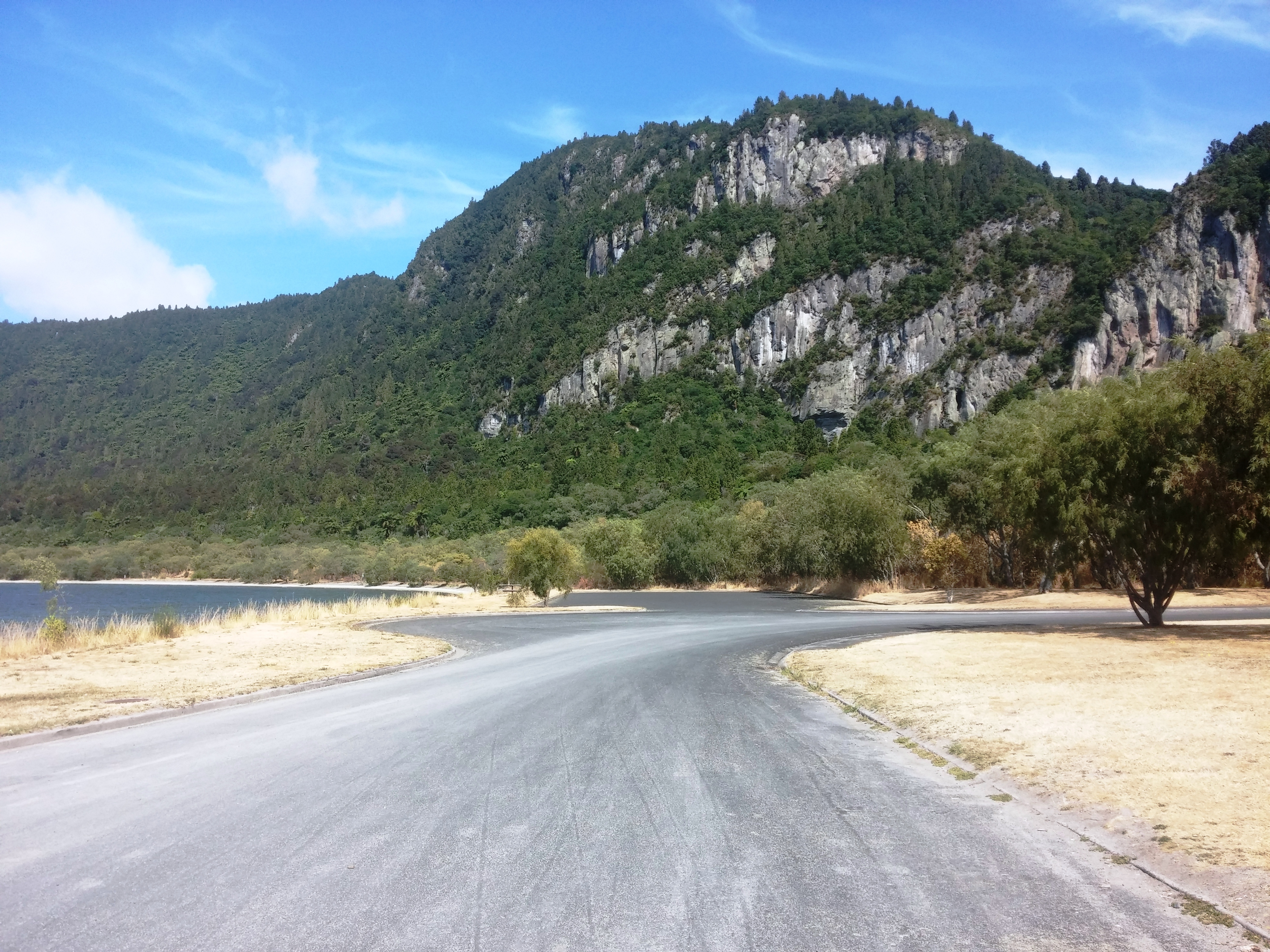
- Kuratau Beach
- Interactive map of Kuratau
- Coordinates: 38.893347°S 175.769783°E
- Country: New Zealand
- Region: Waikato region
- District: Taupō District
- Ward: Turangi-Tongariro General Ward
- Electorates: Taupō; Waiariki (Māori)

Government
  - Territorial Authority: Taupō District Council
  - Regional council: Waikato Regional Council
  - Mayor of Taupō: John Funnell
  - Taupō MP: Louise Upston
  - Waiariki MP: Rawiri Waititi

Area
  - Total: 4.50 km^{2} (1.74 sq mi)

Population (June 2025)
  - Total: 110
  - Density: 24/km^{2} (63/sq mi)

Kuratau is a small village north of Omori and south of Whareroa Village, on the western side of New Zealand's Lake Taupō.

The Kuratau Power Station was built on the Kuratau River near the town and completed in 1962.

Lake Taupō is eroding Kuratau's foreshore at an increasing rate.

== Demographics ==
Statistics New Zealand describes Kuratau as a rural settlement, which covers 4.50 km^{2} (1.74 sq mi). It had an estimated population of 110 as of June 2025, with a population density of 24 people per km^{2}. The settlement is part of the larger Lake Taupō Bays statistical area.

Historical population
Year	Pop.	±% p.a.
2006	87	—
2013	93	+0.96%
2018	93	+0.00%
2023	105	+2.46%

Kuratau had a population of 105 in the 2023 New Zealand census, an increase of 12 people (12.9%) since the 2018 census, and an increase of 12 people (12.9%) since the 2013 census. There were 54 males and 48 females in 81 dwellings. The median age was 63.2 years (compared with 38.1 years nationally). There were 6 people (5.7%) aged under 15 years, 9 (8.6%) aged 15 to 29, 45 (42.9%) aged 30 to 64, and 48 (45.7%) aged 65 or older.

People could identify as more than one ethnicity. The results were 97.1% European (Pākehā), 14.3% Māori, and 2.9% Asian. English was spoken by 97.1%, and other languages by 5.7%. No language could be spoken by 2.9% (e.g. too young to talk). New Zealand Sign Language was known by 2.9%. The percentage of people born overseas was 14.3, compared with 28.8% nationally.

Religious affiliations were 31.4% Christian, and 2.9% Māori religious beliefs. People who answered that they had no religion were 48.6%, and 17.1% of people did not answer the census question.

Of those at least 15 years old, 24 (24.2%) people had a bachelor's or higher degree, 60 (60.6%) had a post-high school certificate or diploma, and 15 (15.2%) people exclusively held high school qualifications. The median income was $32,800, compared with $41,500 nationally. 6 people (6.1%) earned over $100,000 compared to 12.1% nationally. The employment status of those at least 15 was 33 (33.3%) full-time, 15 (15.2%) part-time, and 3 (3.0%) unemployed.

== Marae ==
The local Poukura Marae and Parekawa meeting house is a meeting place of the Ngāti Tūwharetoa hapū of Ngāti Parekāwa.

== Education ==
Kuratau School is a co-educational state primary school, with a roll of 93 as of July 2026. Two schools opened at Hauia and Otaranga in the early 1940s and lasted for a few years. Schools at Moerangi and Rotomoho closed in 1957, when Kuratau School opened. Kuratau School was formally opened on 23 April 1958.
