= List of populated places in New Zealand =

This article lists populated places in New Zealand.

== List of 150 largest urban areas ==
This is a list of urban areas of New Zealand—as defined by Statistics New Zealand—ranked by population. The 150 largest urban areas are listed. Urban areas are defined by the Statistical Standard for Geographic Areas 2018 (SSGA18).

The table's default order is by June 2025 population.

#	Name	Region	Population			Growth	
#	Name	Region	June 2025 est.	2023 census	2018 census	2023 – June 2025	2018–2023
1	Auckland	Auckland	1,547,200	1,402,275	1,345,833	+10.33%	+4.19%
2	Christchurch	Canterbury	407,800	380,079	358,068	+7.29%	+6.15%
3	Wellington	Wellington	209,800	201,708	201,792	+4.01%	−0.04%
4	Hamilton	Waikato	192,100	174,741	160,911	+9.93%	+8.59%
5	Tauranga	Bay of Plenty	160,900	152,790	137,130	+5.31%	+11.42%
6	Lower Hutt	Wellington	113,200	106,530	103,545	+6.26%	+2.88%
7	Dunedin	Otago	104,000	100,908	99,885	+3.06%	+1.02%
8	Palmerston North	Manawatū-Whanganui	81,200	78,021	76,281	+4.07%	+2.28%
9	Hibiscus Coast	Auckland	67,800	63,351	53,730	+7.02%	+17.91%
10	Napier	Hawke's Bay	66,400	64,695	62,241	+2.64%	+3.94%
11	New Plymouth	Taranaki	60,200	58,047	54,279	+3.71%	+6.94%
12	Porirua	Wellington	60,100	58,080	55,218	+3.48%	+5.18%
13	Rotorua	Bay of Plenty	58,500	55,326	54,186	+5.74%	+2.10%
14	Whangārei	Northland	56,100	53,841	51,894	+4.20%	+3.75%
15	Invercargill	Southland	51,200	48,987	47,844	+4.52%	+2.39%
16	Nelson	Nelson	50,800	49,224	48,129	+3.20%	+2.28%
17	Hastings	Hawke's Bay	49,800	47,682	45,075	+4.44%	+5.78%
18	Upper Hutt	Wellington	44,500	42,903	41,301	+3.72%	+3.88%
19	Whanganui	Manawatū-Whanganui	42,800	41,481	39,777	+3.18%	+4.28%
20	Gisborne	Gisborne	38,100	36,912	34,644	+3.22%	+6.55%
21	Rolleston	Canterbury	34,100	28,449	17,541	+19.86%	+62.19%
22	Paraparaumu	Wellington	29,900	28,938	28,701	+3.32%	+0.83%
23	Blenheim	Marlborough	29,800	28,788	27,648	+3.52%	+4.12%
24	Timaru	Canterbury	29,300	28,095	27,501	+4.29%	+2.16%
25	Queenstown	Otago	29,000	25,050	20,346	+15.77%	+23.12%
26	Pukekohe	Auckland	28,800	27,042	23,841	+6.50%	+13.43%
27	Taupō	Waikato	27,000	25,374	23,622	+6.41%	+7.42%
28	Cambridge	Waikato	22,700	21,366	18,681	+6.24%	+14.37%
29	Masterton	Wellington	22,600	21,606	19,917	+4.60%	+8.48%
30	Ashburton	Canterbury	21,600	20,346	19,356	+6.16%	+5.11%
31	Levin	Manawatū-Whanganui	20,500	19,533	17,775	+4.95%	+9.89%
32	Richmond	Tasman	19,950	18,447	15,378	+8.15%	+19.96%
33	Rangiora	Canterbury	19,300	18,855	17,898	+2.36%	+5.35%
34	Feilding	Manawatū-Whanganui	17,650	16,929	15,990	+4.26%	+5.87%
35	Whakatāne	Bay of Plenty	16,950	16,419	15,795	+3.23%	+3.95%
36	Mosgiel	Otago	15,100	14,589	13,656	+3.50%	+6.83%
37	Havelock North	Hawke's Bay	15,000	15,003	14,391	−0.02%	+4.25%
38	Tokoroa	Waikato	14,500	14,001	13,572	+3.56%	+3.16%
39	Oamaru	Otago	14,300	13,680	13,065	+4.53%	+4.71%
40	Te Awamutu	Waikato	13,950	13,380	12,543	+4.26%	+6.67%
41	Kaiapoi	Canterbury	13,700	13,017	11,853	+5.25%	+9.82%
42	Waikanae	Wellington	13,600	12,966	12,099	+4.89%	+7.17%
43	Wānaka	Otago	13,200	11,922	9,555	+10.72%	+24.77%
44	Lincoln	Canterbury	12,100	10,611	6,522	+14.03%	+62.70%
45	Hāwera	Taranaki	10,700	10,365	9,792	+3.23%	+5.85%
46	Te Puke	Bay of Plenty	10,400	9,114	8,631	+14.11%	+5.60%
47	Waiuku	Auckland	9,860	9,531	9,273	+3.45%	+2.78%
48	Morrinsville	Waikato	9,770	9,003	7,893	+8.52%	+14.06%
49	Matamata	Waikato	9,540	9,132	8,043	+4.47%	+13.54%
50	Greymouth	West Coast	8,610	8,337	7,965	+3.27%	+4.67%
51	Ngāruawāhia	Waikato	8,570	7,992	6,987	+7.23%	+14.38%
52	Huntly	Waikato	8,550	8,232	7,947	+3.86%	+3.59%
53	Kerikeri	Northland	8,380	8,070	7,185	+3.84%	+12.32%
54	Beachlands-Pine Harbour	Auckland	8,330	7,797	6,261	+6.84%	+24.53%
55	Gore	Southland	8,310	8,181	7,908	+1.58%	+3.45%
56	Motueka	Tasman	8,290	8,190	7,998	+1.22%	+2.40%
57	Kumeū-Huapai	Auckland	8,270	6,948	3,480	+19.03%	+99.66%
58	Waiheke Island	Auckland	8,160	7,998	7,959	+2.03%	+0.49%
59	Waitara	Taranaki	7,720	7,509	7,005	+2.81%	+7.19%
60	Kawerau	Bay of Plenty	7,680	7,539	7,146	+1.87%	+5.50%
61	Cromwell	Otago	7,470	6,783	5,610	+10.13%	+20.91%
62	Pōkeno	Waikato	7,380	6,081	2,619	+21.36%	+132.19%
63	Thames	Waikato	7,230	7,212	7,344	+0.25%	−1.80%
64	Warkworth	Auckland	7,080	6,675	5,586	+6.07%	+19.50%
65	Stratford	Taranaki	6,430	6,330	5,886	+1.58%	+7.54%
66	Kaitaia	Northland	6,170	5,955	5,868	+3.61%	+1.48%
67	Whitianga	Waikato	6,140	6,054	5,493	+1.42%	+10.21%
68	Tuakau	Waikato	6,090	5,736	5,103	+6.17%	+12.40%
69	Katikati	Bay of Plenty	6,030	5,580	5,136	+8.06%	+8.64%
70	Carterton	Wellington	5,930	5,859	5,343	+1.21%	+9.66%
71	Alexandra	Otago	5,860	5,589	5,475	+4.85%	+2.08%
72	Waihi	Waikato	5,850	5,682	5,409	+2.96%	+5.05%
73	Ōmokoroa	Bay of Plenty	5,800	5,451	3,288	+6.40%	+65.78%
74	Prebbleton	Canterbury	5,750	5,382	4,518	+6.84%	+19.12%
75	Marton	Manawatū-Whanganui	5,730	5,598	5,229	+2.36%	+7.06%
76	Dannevirke	Manawatū-Whanganui	5,640	5,580	5,505	+1.08%	+1.36%
77	Woodend	Canterbury	5,470	4,542	2,829	+20.43%	+60.55%
78	Ngongotahā	Bay of Plenty	5,280	5,124	4,869	+3.04%	+5.24%
79	Ōtaki	Wellington	5,260	5,025	4,608	+4.68%	+9.05%
80	Dargaville	Northland	5,170	5,016	4,827	+3.07%	+3.92%
81	Taumarunui	Manawatū-Whanganui	4,940	4,821	4,710	+2.47%	+2.36%
82	Ōpōtiki	Bay of Plenty	4,900	4,839	4,791	+1.26%	+1.00%
83=	Picton	Marlborough	4,850	4,812	4,587	+0.79%	+4.91%
83=	Te Kūiti	Waikato	4,850	4,659	4,572	+4.10%	+1.90%
85	Temuka	Canterbury	4,760	4,593	4,467	+3.64%	+2.82%
86	Waipukurau	Hawke's Bay	4,750	4,698	4,416	+1.11%	+6.39%
87	Te Aroha	Waikato	4,730	4,650	4,551	+1.72%	+2.18%
88=	Kaikohe	Northland	4,720	4,563	4,455	+3.44%	+2.42%
88=	Wairoa	Hawke's Bay	4,720	4,707	4,527	+0.28%	+3.98%
90=	Paeroa	Waikato	4,600	4,458	4,269	+3.19%	+4.43%
90=	Westport	West Coast	4,600	4,527	4,392	+1.61%	+3.07%
92	Putāruru	Waikato	4,560	4,455	4,314	+2.36%	+3.27%
93	Balclutha	Otago	4,460	4,347	4,110	+2.60%	+5.77%
94	Pegasus	Canterbury	4,260	3,915	2,637	+8.81%	+48.46%
95	Whangamatā	Waikato	4,230	4,269	4,074	−0.91%	+4.79%
96	Inglewood	Taranaki	3,970	3,801	3,555	+4.45%	+6.92%
97	Tūrangi	Waikato	3,960	3,792	3,444	+4.43%	+10.10%
98	Raglan	Waikato	3,910	3,717	3,327	+5.19%	+11.72%
99	Riverhead	Auckland	3,840	3,558	2,724	+7.93%	+30.62%
100	Kihikihi	Waikato	3,820	3,456	2,754	+10.53%	+25.49%
101	Te Kauwhata	Waikato	3,780	3,303	2,118	+14.44%	+55.95%
102	Snells Beach	Auckland	3,750	3,678	3,405	+1.96%	+8.02%
103	Waimate	Canterbury	3,610	3,591	3,456	+0.53%	+3.91%
104	Darfield	Canterbury	3,590	3,249	2,784	+10.50%	+16.70%
105	Helensville	Auckland	3,540	3,279	2,820	+7.96%	+16.28%
106	Foxton	Manawatū-Whanganui	3,520	3,384	3,141	+4.02%	+7.74%
107	Hokitika	West Coast	3,420	3,267	3,096	+4.68%	+5.52%
108=	Ashhurst	Manawatū-Whanganui	3,350	3,237	2,934	+3.49%	+10.33%
108=	One Tree Point	Northland	3,350	2,988	2,217	+12.12%	+34.78%
110	Ōtorohanga	Waikato	3,240	3,180	3,027	+1.89%	+5.05%
111	Lyttelton	Canterbury	3,220	3,123	2,982	+3.11%	+4.73%
112=	Geraldine	Canterbury	3,070	3,018	2,883	+1.72%	+4.68%
112=	Ōhope	Bay of Plenty	3,070	3,033	3,177	+1.22%	−4.53%
114	Te Anau	Southland	2,920	2,751	2,574	+6.14%	+6.88%
115	Ruakākā	Northland	2,890	2,817	2,586	+2.59%	+8.93%
116=	Amberley	Canterbury	2,870	2,520	2,070	+13.89%	+21.74%
116=	Featherston	Wellington	2,870	2,793	2,487	+2.76%	+12.30%
118	Arrowtown	Otago	2,860	2,838	2,853	+0.78%	−0.53%
119	Greytown	Wellington	2,840	2,772	2,466	+2.45%	+12.41%
120	Pahiatua	Manawatū-Whanganui	2,830	2,838	2,682	−0.28%	+5.82%
121	Mangawhai Heads	Northland	2,760	2,685	1,995	+2.79%	+34.59%
122	Wakefield	Tasman	2,730	2,694	2,448	+1.34%	+10.05%
123	West Melton	Canterbury	2,700	2,409	1,971	+12.08%	+22.22%
124	Maraetai	Auckland	2,660	2,553	2,346	+4.19%	+8.82%
125	Waihi Beach-Bowentown	Bay of Plenty	2,620	2,550	2,484	+2.75%	+2.66%
126	Winton	Southland	2,560	2,475	2,337	+3.43%	+5.91%
127	Lake Hāwea	Otago	2,500	2,001	1,200	+24.94%	+66.75%
128=	Leeston	Canterbury	2,470	2,271	2,208	+8.76%	+2.85%
128=	Renwick	Marlborough	2,470	2,448	2,418	+0.90%	+1.24%
130	Waipawa	Hawke's Bay	2,430	2,334	2,085	+4.11%	+11.94%
131	Kaikōura	Canterbury	2,350	2,316	2,223	+1.47%	+4.18%
132	Brightwater	Tasman	2,330	2,280	2,133	+2.19%	+6.89%
133	Oxford	Canterbury	2,250	2,235	2,214	+0.67%	+0.95%
134	Ōtaki Beach	Wellington	2,230	2,145	1,818	+3.96%	+17.99%
135	Foxton Beach	Manawatū-Whanganui	2,190	2,130	1,884	+2.82%	+13.06%
136	Methven	Canterbury	2,170	1,977	1,779	+9.76%	+12.25%
137=	Eltham	Taranaki	2,120	2,097	1,947	+1.10%	+7.70%
137=	Milton	Otago	2,120	2,121	2,157	−0.05%	−1.67%
139=	Bulls	Manawatū-Whanganui	2,110	2,055	1,935	+2.68%	+6.20%
139=	Wellsford	Auckland	2,110	2,037	1,974	+3.58%	+3.19%
141	Clive	Hawke's Bay	2,040	1,992	1,887	+2.41%	+5.56%
142	Moerewa	Northland	1,930	1,845	1,737	+4.61%	+6.22%
143	Murupara	Bay of Plenty	1,910	1,884	1,815	+1.38%	+3.80%
144	Martinborough	Wellington	1,900	1,875	1,824	+1.33%	+2.80%
145	Edgecumbe	Bay of Plenty	1,890	1,800	1,644	+7.22%	+9.49%
146	Bluff	Southland	1,840	1,797	1,797	+2.39%	0.00%
147	Twizel	Canterbury	1,790	1,674	1,515	+6.93%	+10.50%
148=	Coromandel	Waikato	1,780	1,782	1,743	−0.11%	+2.24%
148=	Ōakura	Taranaki	1,780	1,764	1,539	+3.74%	+14.62%
150	Paekākāriki	Wellington	1,740	1,674	1,746	+3.94%	−4.12%

== List of towns ==
Towns are not legally defined in New Zealand since the 1989 local government reforms; however, historically town districts and county towns were legally defined and recognised. This list includes both legal entities such as town districts and settlements commonly referred to as towns.

- Ahipara
- Akaroa
- Alexandra
- Arrowtown
- Ashburton
- Balclutha
- Bell Block
- Blenheim
- Bluff
- Brunner
- Cambridge
- Carterton
- Clive
- Colac Bay
- Cromwell
- Dannevirke
- Dargaville
- Eketāhuna
- Featherston
- Feilding
- Flat Bush
- Foxton Beach
- Frankton
- Gisborne
- Gore
- Granity
- Greta Valley
- Greymouth
- Greytown
- Haast
- Haast Beach
- Hampden
- Hanmer Springs
- Haumoana
- Havelock North
- Hāwera
- Helensville
- Hikurangi
- Hokitika
- Huntly
- Inglewood
- Kaiapoi
- Kaikohe
- Kaikōura
- Kaitaia
- Kamo
- Katikati
- Kaukapakapa
- Kaponga
- Kawakawa
- Kawerau
- Kerikeri
- Kihikihi
- Kumeū
- Kuratau
- Levin
- Lincoln
- Lyttelton
- Makarewa
- Manaia, Taranaki
- Mangakino
- Mangawhai Heads
- Mangōnui
- Martinborough
- Marton
- Masterton
- Matamata
- Matatā
- Minginui
- Moerewa
- Morrinsville
- Mosgiel
- Motueka
- Motuoapa
- Mount Cook Village
- Mount Maunganui
- Murupara
- Murchison
- Murupara
- Ngāruawāhia
- Ōakura
- Oamaru
- Ohakune
- Ōpōtiki
- Ōpunake
- Orewa
- Otaki
- Ōtaki Beach
- Otematata
- Ōtorohanga
- Owaka
- Paekākāriki
- Paeroa
- Paihia
- Palmerston
- Parakai
- Paraparaumu
- Paraparaumu Beach
- Picton
- Pōkeno
- Port Chalmers
- Prebbleton
- Pukekohe
- Putāruru
- Queenstown
- Raetihi
- Raglan
- Rakaia
- Rangiora
- Rangitata
- Raumati Beach
- Raumati South
- Rawene
- Reefton
- Richmond
- Riverton / Aparima
- Rolleston
- Russell
- Silverdale
- Stoke
- Stratford
- Taihape
- Taumarunui
- Taupō
- Te Anau
- Te Aroha
- Te Awamutu
- Te Awanga
- Te Kūiti
- Temple View
- Temuka
- Te Puke
- Thames
- Timaru
- Tinwald
- Tīrau
- Tokoroa
- Tuakau
- Tūrangi
- Twizel
- Upper Hutt
- Waihi
- Waikanae
- Waikanae Beach
- Waimate
- Waimauku
- Wainuiomata
- Waiouru
- Waipukurau
- Wairoa
- Waitara
- Waiuku
- Wānaka
- Warkworth
- Waverley
- Westport
- Whakatāne
- Whangamatā
- Whangaparāoa
- Wharewaka

== List of town districts ==
Town districts existed within counties and were either independent or dependent. Independent town districts required 500 residents, a density over more than one person per acre and not exceed an area of two square miles.

- Ellerslie (1908–1938)
- Henderson (1922–1946)
- Howick (1922–1952)
- Kohukohu
- Manurewa (1915–1937)
- New Lynn (1910–1929)
- Mercer (1914–1962)
- Warkworth (1908–1954)

== List of county towns ==
County towns had county town committees that were appointed by the county council and served in an advisory role on matters related to the town. County towns did not have independent governance.

- Beachlands (1954)
- Bucklands and Eastern Beaches (1954) (Note: This county town included the settlements of Bucklands Beach and Eastern Beaches)
- Glenfield (1961)
- Green Bay (1958)
- Kelston West (1959)
- Leigh (1954)
- Mangere Bridge (1954)
- Mangere East (1955)
- Maraetai (1962)
- Orewa (1962)
- Otara (1964)
- Pakuranga (1956)
- Titirangi (1958)
- Wellsford (1953)

== List of town councils ==
- Warkworth (1954–1976)

== Places with 'township' as part of name ==
- Howick Township
- Panmure Township
- Township of Onehunga

== See also ==
- Cities in New Zealand
