= Tūrangi =

Town in Waikato, New Zealand

- Town
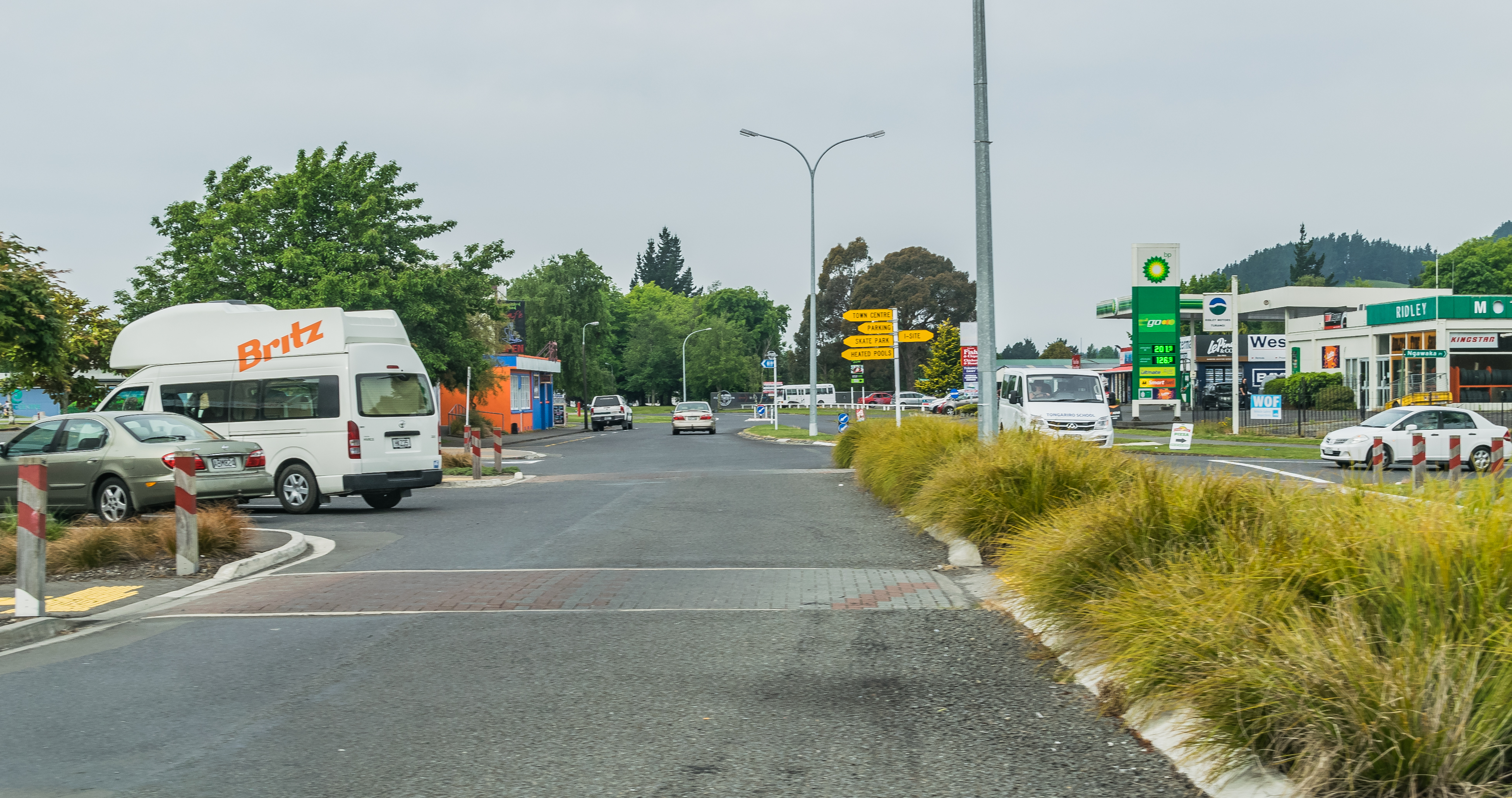
- Ohuanga Road
- Interactive map of Tūrangi
- Coordinates: 38°59′20″S 175°48′30″E
- Country: New Zealand
- Region: Waikato
- Territorial authority: Taupō District
- Ward: Tūrangi-Tongariro General Ward
- Electorates: Taupō; Waiariki (Māori)

Government
  - Territorial Authority: Taupō District Council
  - Regional council: Waikato Regional Council
  - Mayor of Taupō: John Funnell
  - Taupō MP: Louise Upston
  - Waiariki MP: Rawiri Waititi

Area
  - Total: 7.53 km^{2} (2.91 sq mi)
- Elevation: 380 m (1,250 ft)

Population (June 2025)
  - Total: 3,960
  - Density: 526/km^{2} (1,360/sq mi)
- Time zone: UTC+12 (NZST)
  - Summer (DST): UTC+13 (NZDT)
- Postcode: 3334
- Area code: 07

Tūrangi is a small town on the west bank of the Tongariro River, 50 kilometres south-west of Taupō on the North Island Volcanic Plateau of New Zealand. It was built to accommodate the workers associated with the Tongariro hydro-electric power development project and their families. The town was designed to remain as a small servicing centre for the exotic forest plantations south of Lake Taupō and for tourists. It is well known for its trout fishing and calls itself "the trout fishing capital of the world". The major Māori hapū (tribe) of the Tūrangi area is Ngāti Tūrangitukua.

== Geography ==
The Tūrangi area covers some 2273 km², and is located close to the edge of the Kaimanawa Ranges and ten kilometres north of the stretch of State Highway 1 known as the Desert Road.

The streets around Tūrangi in autumn are lined with "brilliant" foliage.

Built on the banks of the Tongariro River, Tūrangi and its surrounding countryside offers challenging hunting, fishing, mountain biking, hiking or leisurely bush walks, white water rafting, kayaking and sight seeing.

=== Climate ===
Climate data for Turangi, elevation 360 m (1,180 ft), (1991–2020 normals, extremes 1968–present)
Month	Jan	Feb	Mar	Apr	May	Jun	Jul	Aug	Sep	Oct	Nov	Dec	Year
Record high °C (°F)	31.4 (88.5)	32.6 (90.7)	29.3 (84.7)	25.1 (77.2)	22.4 (72.3)	19.4 (66.9)	17.6 (63.7)	18.1 (64.6)	24.3 (75.7)	26.6 (79.9)	29.2 (84.6)	31.6 (88.9)	32.6 (90.7)
Mean maximum °C (°F)	28.7 (83.7)	27.8 (82.0)	25.8 (78.4)	22.2 (72.0)	19.3 (66.7)	16.7 (62.1)	15.2 (59.4)	16.2 (61.2)	19.3 (66.7)	21.8 (71.2)	25.1 (77.2)	26.2 (79.2)	29.3 (84.7)
Mean daily maximum °C (°F)	23.3 (73.9)	23.3 (73.9)	21.2 (70.2)	17.9 (64.2)	15.0 (59.0)	12.4 (54.3)	11.6 (52.9)	12.4 (54.3)	14.4 (57.9)	16.4 (61.5)	18.7 (65.7)	21.0 (69.8)	17.3 (63.1)
Daily mean °C (°F)	16.8 (62.2)	17.0 (62.6)	14.8 (58.6)	11.9 (53.4)	9.6 (49.3)	7.4 (45.3)	6.6 (43.9)	7.3 (45.1)	9.1 (48.4)	11.2 (52.2)	12.9 (55.2)	15.4 (59.7)	11.7 (53.0)
Mean daily minimum °C (°F)	10.4 (50.7)	10.7 (51.3)	8.4 (47.1)	6.0 (42.8)	4.1 (39.4)	2.4 (36.3)	1.6 (34.9)	2.1 (35.8)	3.9 (39.0)	6.0 (42.8)	7.1 (44.8)	9.8 (49.6)	6.0 (42.9)
Mean minimum °C (°F)	3.3 (37.9)	3.2 (37.8)	0.5 (32.9)	−1.4 (29.5)	−3.7 (25.3)	−4.5 (23.9)	−5.5 (22.1)	−4.6 (23.7)	−3.4 (25.9)	−1.7 (28.9)	−0.5 (31.1)	1.7 (35.1)	−6.0 (21.2)
Record low °C (°F)	0.6 (33.1)	−1.0 (30.2)	−2.1 (28.2)	−3.1 (26.4)	−6.3 (20.7)	−7.0 (19.4)	−9.5 (14.9)	−7.2 (19.0)	−10.0 (14.0)	−4.4 (24.1)	−5.0 (23.0)	−0.5 (31.1)	−10.0 (14.0)
Average rainfall mm (inches)	99.7 (3.93)	90.8 (3.57)	92.2 (3.63)	122.9 (4.84)	129.3 (5.09)	142.3 (5.60)	154.2 (6.07)	154.9 (6.10)	137.1 (5.40)	134.5 (5.30)	116.1 (4.57)	131.1 (5.16)	1,505.1 (59.26)
Mean monthly sunshine hours	239.1	201.5	196.3	160.9	145.3	122.6	125.9	136.6	140.6	177.6	211.4	207.5	2,065.3
Source: NIWA

== Population and demographics ==
Stats NZ describes Tūrangi as a small urban area, which covers 7.53 km^{2} (2.91 sq mi). It had an estimated population of 3,960 as of June 2025, with a population density of 526 people per km^{2}. It is the second largest population centre in the Taupō District after Taupō. Tūrangi's population peaked at 9,000 during the 1970s. After the end of the Project in the 1980s the population declined but has since remained stable due to the town's handy location for tourists.

Historical population
Year	Pop.	±% p.a.
2006	3,240	—
2013	2,952	−1.32%
2018	3,444	+3.13%
2023	3,792	+1.94%

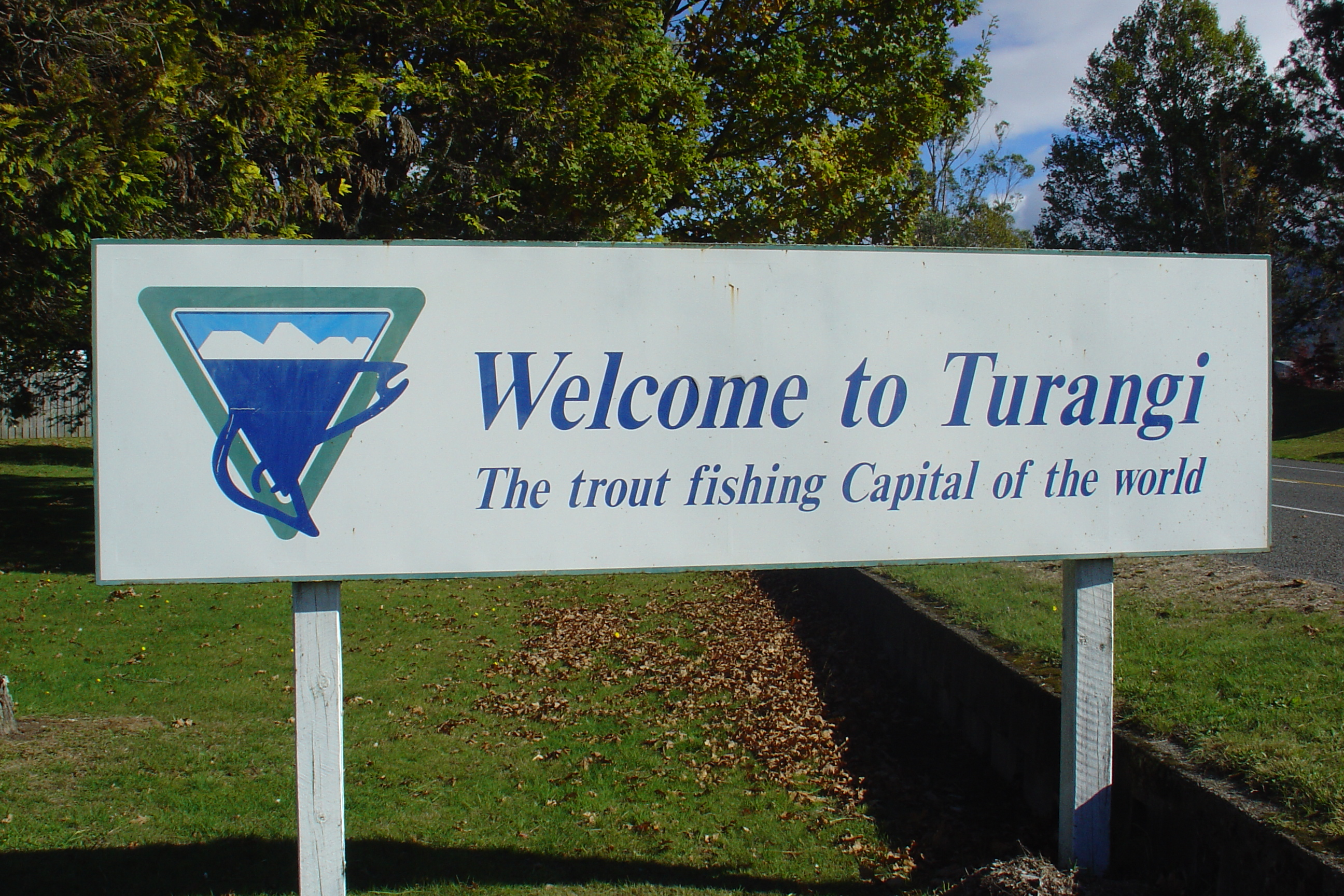
Welcome sign

Tūrangi had a population of 3,792 in the 2023 New Zealand census, an increase of 348 people (10.1%) since the 2018 census, and an increase of 840 people (28.5%) since the 2013 census. There were 1,860 males, 1,920 females, and 6 people of other genders in 1,461 dwellings. 2.2% of people identified as LGBTIQ+. The median age was 39.4 years (compared with 38.1 years nationally). There were 774 people (20.4%) aged under 15 years, 708 (18.7%) aged 15 to 29, 1,557 (41.1%) aged 30 to 64, and 750 (19.8%) aged 65 or older.

People could identify as more than one ethnicity. The results were 51.4% European (Pākehā); 64.2% Māori; 5.8% Pasifika; 4.1% Asian; 0.2% Middle Eastern, Latin American and African New Zealanders (MELAA); and 1.9% other, which includes people giving their ethnicity as "New Zealander". English was spoken by 96.4%, Māori by 22.8%, Samoan by 0.3%, and other languages by 5.1%. No language could be spoken by 1.8% (e.g. too young to talk). New Zealand Sign Language was known by 0.9%. The percentage of people born overseas was 12.3, compared with 28.8% nationally.

Religious affiliations were 25.6% Christian, 0.3% Hindu, 15.5% Māori religious beliefs, 0.6% Buddhist, 0.5% New Age, and 0.7% other religions. People who answered that they had no religion were 49.4%, and 7.8% of people did not answer the census question.

Of those at least 15 years old, 357 (11.8%) people had a bachelor's or higher degree, 1,779 (58.9%) had a post-high school certificate or diploma, and 885 (29.3%) people exclusively held high school qualifications. The median income was $30,300, compared with $41,500 nationally. 111 people (3.7%) earned over $100,000 compared to 12.1% nationally. The employment status of those at least 15 was 1,290 (42.7%) full-time, 369 (12.2%) part-time, and 135 (4.5%) unemployed.

== Economy ==
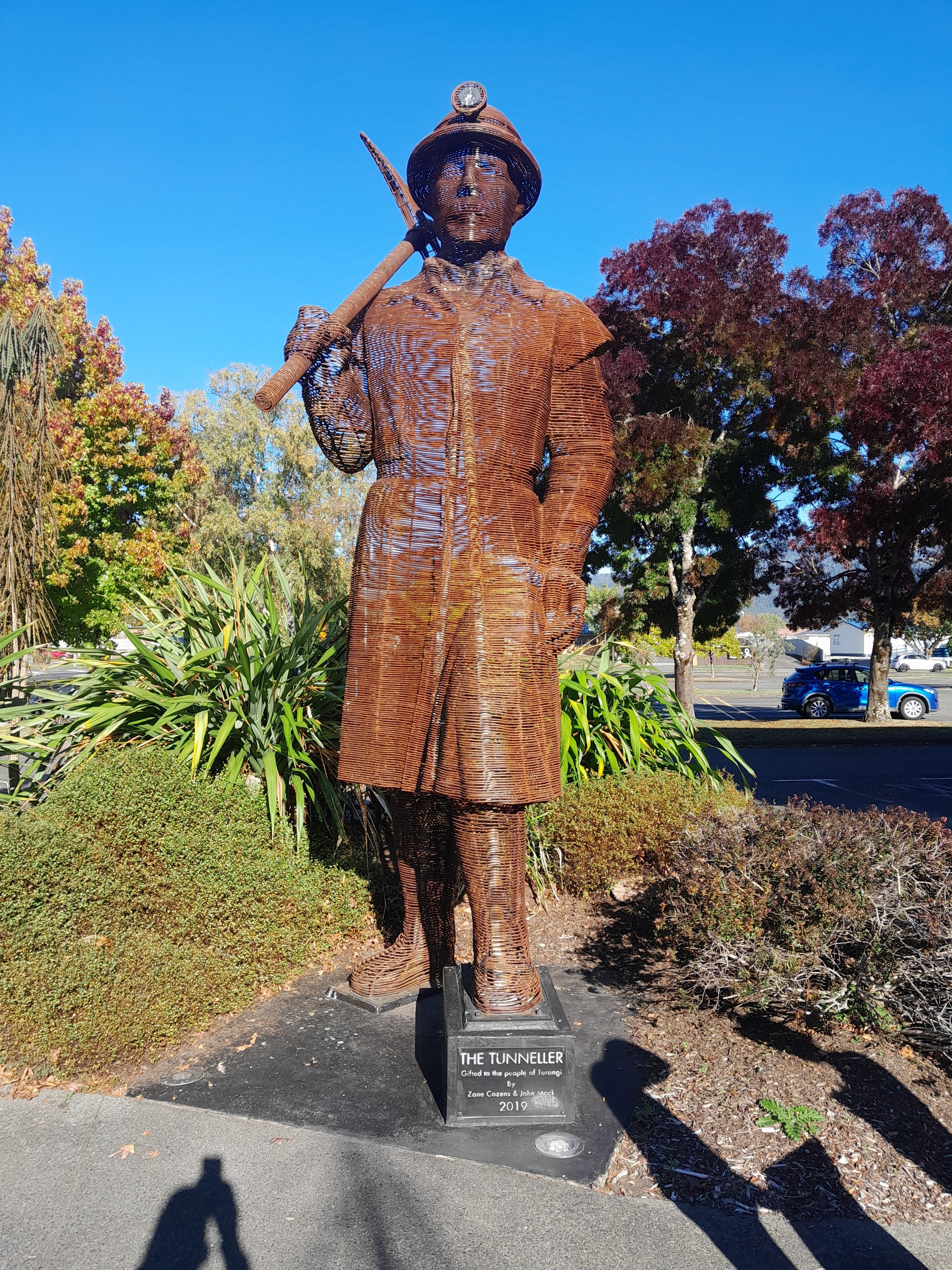
Statue of The Tunneller, located in central Turangi highlighting the contribution of workers on the Tongariro power scheme.

Tourism and forestry are the mainstay of the community with the Department of Corrections two prisons, Genesis Energy, the Department of Conservation and farming being the main employers. The town is also home to a Centre for Sustainable Practice at Awhi Farm, providing education and enterprise training.

== History ==
=== Māori settlement ===
The area was settled by the people of Ngāti Tūwharetoa, descendants of those who had originally settled in the Kawerau area. The Ngāti Tūwharetoa invasion of Taupō occurred from about the 16th century with a war party under command of Tūrangitukua who engaged in a number of battles against earlier inhabitants of the Taupō, Rotoaira and Kaimanawa area. Following these battles a variety of settlements were established in the area with major pa established on the cliff overlooking the Tongariro River and at Waitahanui on the Tongariro Delta. Another important settlement was at Tokaanu.

The people who eventually become known as Ngāti Tūrangitukua associate mainly with Waitahanui pā. From here they established a number of homesteads along both sides of the Tongariro River and its tributaries, including houses along the main Highway to Taumarunui (now Hirangi Road). In 1910 construction of a wharepuni begun which eventually became the Hirangi Marae complex.

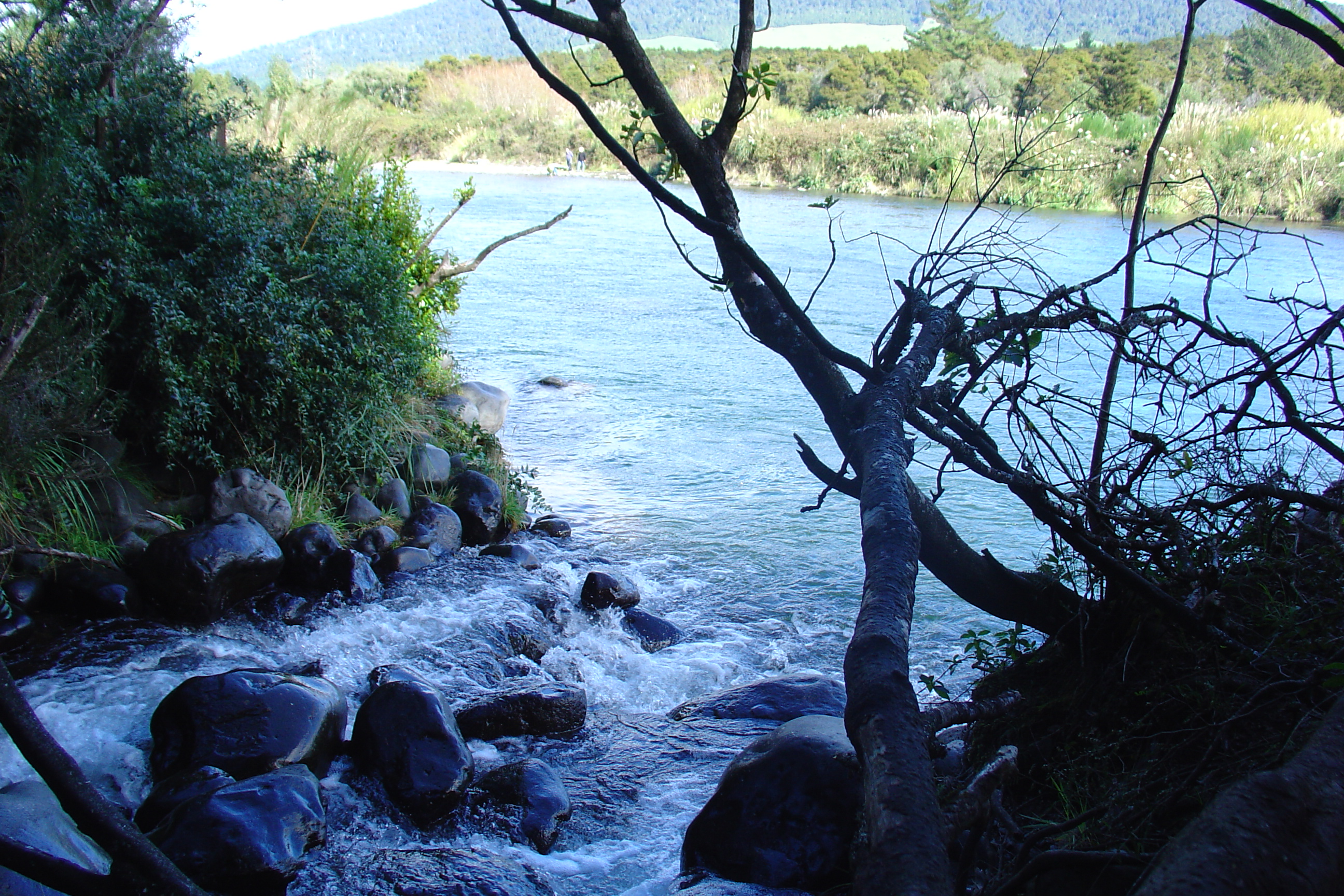
Tongariro River

=== Non-Māori settlement ===
The first Europeans reached the Tūrangi area in the 1830s, however it was not until the 1850s that European settlement occurred with the construction of a Mission Station at Pukawa.

In the 1880s and 1890s brown and rainbow trout were introduced into the lake and rivers of the area. A small fishing camp was established at Taupahi on the Tongariro River bank (now Taupahi Road). European settlers used the camp for recreational fishing.

In the 1920s two prison farms were opened at Rangipo and Hautu because of the isolated nature of the area. Also during this period the Morar family arrived from India, settling and establishing a store in Tokaanu.

By 1960, the population was about 500.

=== Tongariro power development ===
In the 1950s, in response to post World War II needs for rapid expansion of energy resources to meet the growing industrialisation in New Zealand, the Tongariro Power Scheme proposal was developed. The scheme would require a large construction force, and provide accommodation for that force for the duration of the project.

Four sites were considered for the township to accommodate the project workers: Rotoaira, Rangipo, Tūrangi West, and Tūrangi East. The tourism potential of Lake Taupō was appreciated, as well as the economic benefits that could be captured by creating a permanent township. Taking into account accessibility, climate, and adequacy of suitable land for development of a township, it was decided proceed with the Turangi West site.

Construction of the modern town began late in 1964. The Government invested $16 million in the development and by May 1966, the population of Tūrangi had jumped from 500 to 2,500 people. By 1968 the population reached a high of 6,500. A model town with curving streets and cul-de-sacs, uniform houses, pedestrian shopping centre, car parks and separation from the traffic on the main highway was created.

Between 1967 and 1982 several hundred Italian hard-rock tunnellers came to Tūrangi to work on the Ministry of Works's Tongariro Power Development project, building tunnels and an underground power station. The men were contracted by Italian company Codelfa-Cogefar, which supplied accommodation in six camps near the works, medical services, a priest and Italian food and wine for the workers. Many of these men were from around Treviso in northern Italy where the company was based. Italian traditions such as a mass for Santa Barbara, patron saint of tunnellers and miners, were also acknowledged. When the project was completed some of the workers returned to Italy but others stayed in New Zealand. In 2017 a 50-year reunion for Codelfa-Cogefar employees was held in Turangi.

A publicity pamphlet published by the Ministry of Works in 1969 described Tūrangi at that time as a pleasant and attractive town of 5000 people which offered a ‘balanced community life’. The pamphlet enumerated the town's amenities, shops, and services, such as its mall, schools, sports facilities, library, maternity hospital, parks, and, not least, its wide, grassy verges and kerbing.

Following the completion of the project in the late 1970s, the Ministry of Works and other government departments began a process of selling assets within the Turangi township.

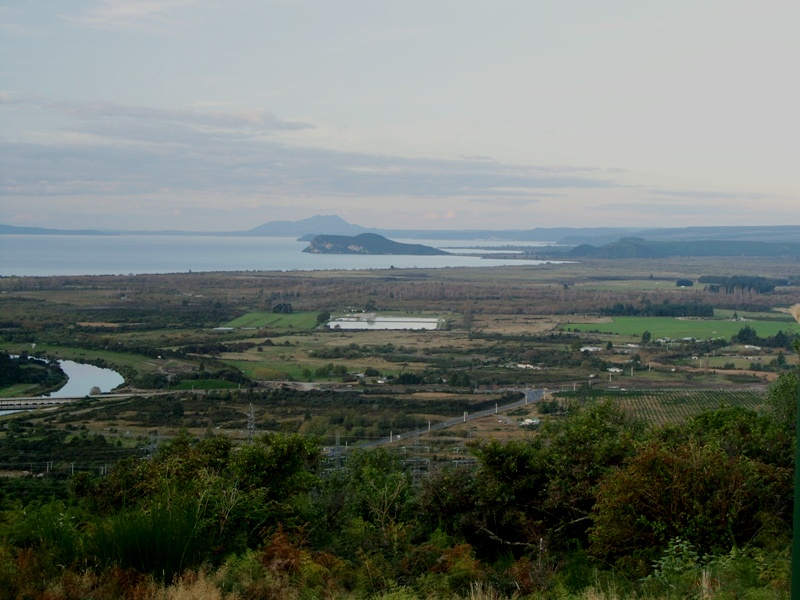
Eastern Lake Taupō, Tūrangi to Taupō

=== Treaty settlement ===
In 1989 Ngāti Tūrangitukua registered with the Waitangi Tribunal (Wai 84). The claim was heard under urgency between April and October 1994, and the Tribunal's Report was released in September 1995.

The Tribunal found that the Crown had breached the principles of the Treaty of Waitangi in a number of ways:

- The Crown acquired Māori land at Tūrangi West when Crown land at Tūrangi East was available:
- The Crown did not adequately consult with Ngāti Tūrangitukua regarding the construction of the township:
- The land taken for the township was in excess of the maximum area that the Crown promised it would take:
- The land the Crown undertook to lease for industrial purposes and return to the people after 10 to 12 years was compulsorily acquired and not returned:
- Wahi tapu were destroyed or damaged in the construction of the township:
- Adequate compensation was not paid for land acquired:
- The Crown did not give full effect to conservation values:
- The Crown did not pay Ngāti Tūrangitukua the respect due its mana as tangata whenua:
- The provisions of the Public Works Act 1928 and the Tūrangi Township Act 1964, relied on by the Crown in entering and taking the claimants' land, are inconsistent with the basic guarantee in Article II of the Treaty of Waitangi that Māori may keep their land until such time as they wish to sell it.
- The Tribunal found that, as a result of the Crown's breaches of the principles of the Treaty, Ngāti Tūrangitukua lost much of its ancestral land. Its social and economic base was seriously eroded causing spiritual, cultural, and economic prejudice to Ngāti Tūrangitukua.

In July 1998, the Crown and Ngāti Tūrangitukua negotiated to achieve a full and final settlement of Ngāti Tūrangitukua's Treaty claims and to remove the continuing sense of grievance.

The Crown and Ngāti Tūrangitukua entered into a deed of settlement on 26 September 1998, resulting in a full and final settlement of Ngāti Tūrangitukua's Treaty claims relating to the development and construction of the Tūrangi Township and its after effects.

In 1999 the Ngāti Tūrangitukua Claims Settlement Act 1999 was passed to:

(a) To record the apology given by the Crown to Ngāti Tūrangitukua in the deed of settlement executed on 26 September 1998 by the Minister in Charge of Treaty of Waitangi Negotiations, the Right Honourable Sir Douglas Arthur Montrose Graham, for the Crown, and Ngāti Tūrangitukua; and
(b) To give effect to certain provisions of that deed of settlement, being a deed that settles the Ngāti Tūrangitukua claims.

=== Marae ===
The local Hīrangi Marae and Tūwharetoa i te Aupōuri meeting house, located in the Tūrangi township, is a meeting place Ngāti Tūrangitukua and Ngāti Tūwharetoa.

Rongomai Marae and meeting house, located east of the township, is a meeting place of the Ngāti Tūwharetoa hapū of Ngāti Rongomai.

Korohē Marae Rereao meeting house, located further east, is a meeting place of the Ngāti Tūwharetoa hapū of Ngāti Hine. In October 2020, the Government committed $1,338,668 from the Provincial Growth Fund to upgrade the marae and 4 other Ngāti Tūwharetoa marae, creating 19 jobs.

== Government ==
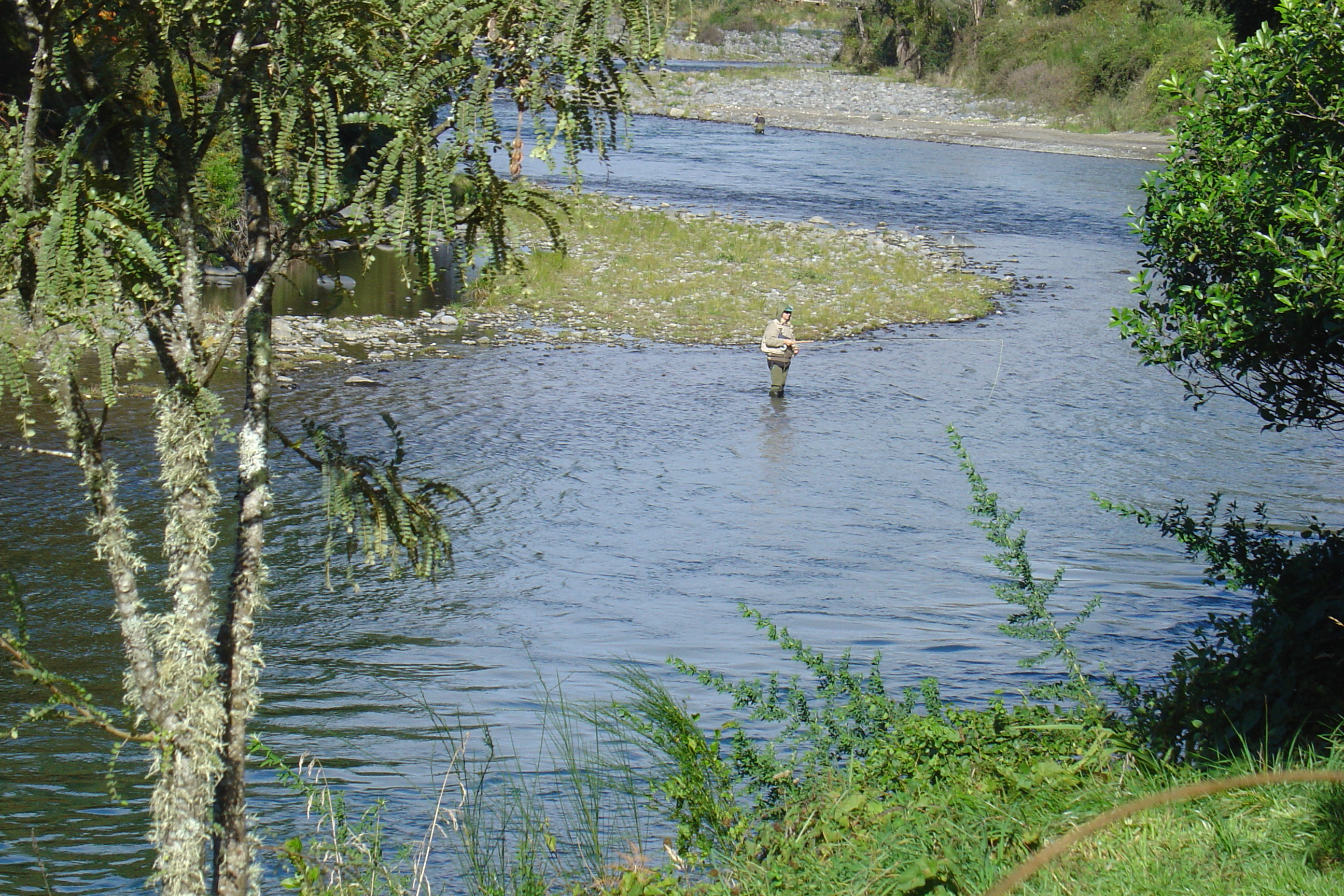
A fisherman trying his luck on the Tongariro River.

Tūrangi is located in the administrative areas of the Taupō District Council and three of the council's eleven representatives are elected directly from a Tūrangi Tongariro ward. Tūrangi is administered by the Turangi/Tongariro Community Board under delegated powers from the Taupō District Council. This ensures that all locally important decisions are made by local residents.

The role of the Tūrangi Tongariro Community Boards is to:

- Represent and act as an advocate for, the interests of its communities.
- Consider and report on all matters referred to it by Council, or any matter of interest to the community board.
- Maintain an overview of services provided by Council within the community.
- Prepare an annual submission to Council on expenditure within the community.
- Communicate with community organisations and special interest groups within the community.

The Taupō District is itself part of the Waikato region, controlled administratively by the Environment Waikato.

Tūrangi is part of the Taupō electorate in New Zealand's general elections. The electorate is currently represented in the New Zealand Parliament by Louise Upston (National).

== Education ==
There are three schools in the Tūrangi area. Within the Tūrangi township are two schools, both area schools which cater for Year 1 to 13 students. The schools opened in February 2004, following the Tūrangi Education Network Review that resulted in the closure of four schools: Hirangi Primary, Turangi Primary, Tongariro High and Tauranga-Taupo Primary Schools were closed. Previously Pihanga Primary existed, but was closed in the mid 1980s.

A single Year 1–15 composite state area school, Tongariro School, was established in their place. with a roll of 366 as of July 2026.

A Kura Kaupapa Māori for Year 1–13 students, Te Kura o Hirangi, was established for those who wish to receive their education in te reo Māori. with a roll of 259.

There is also a rural school at Kuratau, approximately 30 km west of Tūrangi on SH 41 to Taumarunui.

== Sister city ==
According to the Taupō District Council, Tūrangi is a sister city of Kitashiobara, Japan.
