= Kuratau River =

Coordinates: 38°53′S 175°46′E

Location
- Country: New Zealand

Physical characteristics
- Mouth
  - location: Lake Taupō
- Length: 24 km (15 mi)

The Kuratau River is a river of the centre of New Zealand's North Island. It flows generally eastwards, initially flowing southeast from its sources in rough hill country south of the Pureora Forest Park before turning northeast to reach the small Lake Kuratau. From here it flows east 5 kilometres (3 mi) further before flowing into the southwest of Lake Taupō close to the settlement of Kuratau.

Waters from the river are used for power generation at the Kuratau Power Station.

== See also ==
- List of rivers of New Zealand
