= Tongariro River =

Coordinates: 38°56′17.00″S 175°46′51.70″E

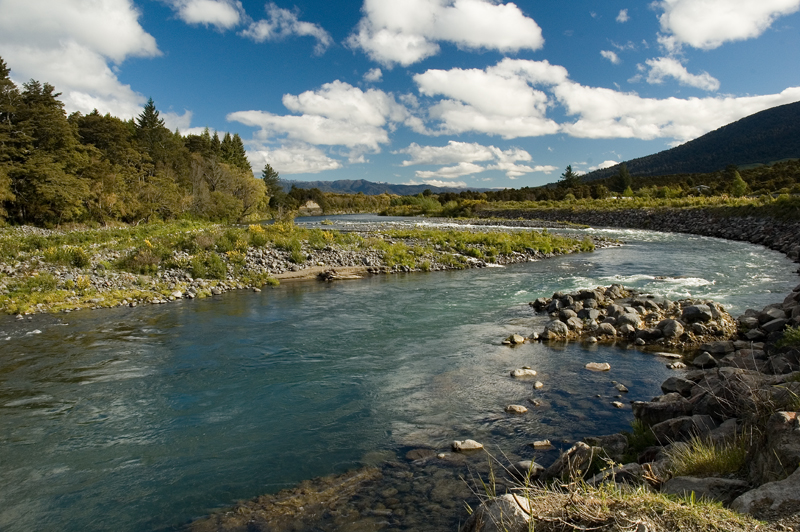
- Looking south towards the Hydro Pool

Location
- Country: New Zealand

Physical characteristics
- Source
  - location: Tongariro National Park
- Mouth
  - location: Lake Taupō
  - elevation: 356 m (1,168 ft)

The Tongariro River is a river in the North Island of New Zealand. The part of the Waikato River from the Waihohonu Stream, down to Lake Taupō, was formally named the Tongariro River in 1945. The river originates in the Central Plateau of the North Island where it is fed by numerous tributaries (such as the Whitikau, Poutu, and Mangamawhitiwhiti streams) that flow off the surrounding hill ranges and mountains such as Mount Ruapehu. It then winds its way north, through the township of Tūrangi before entering Lake Taupō via a number of river mouths. The minimum volume of water flowing down the lower Tongariro River ranges from approximately 16 cubic metres per second (570 cu ft/s) (recorded at the upper river's Poutu Intake) to 21 cubic metres per second (740 cu ft/s) (recorded at the lower river's Major Jones Pool). This volume can substantially increase due to catchment of rainfall by the surrounding mountains and hill ranges.

== Recreation ==
=== Fishing ===
The Tongariro River is New Zealand's most fished river, and is a drawcard for anglers the world over, who come to the Tongariro to fish for spawning rainbow trout and brown trout, which run up the river from the lake to spawn over the colder winter months. Approximately 75% of the trout in the Tongariro are rainbow trout, and 25% are brown trout.

Unusually for a New Zealand river, the pools on the Tongariro River have officially accepted names. Pools on the Tongariro River are usually named after historical people who have fished the river (Major Jones Pool, Duchess Pool), or their geographic location (Birch Pool, Fence Pool, Redhut Pool). Floods have significantly altered the size and shape of many of these pools (such as in 2004 when the Breakaway Pool was completely lost due a change in the river's direction), while others such as the Major Jones Pool have remained relatively unchanged in the last 50 years. A list of the pools and their locations can be found at List of pools of the Tongariro River.

Fishing techniques that prove to be popular include nymphing, wet lining and dry fly techniques. A fly fishing casting technique similar to a single handed spey cast called the Tongariro roll cast was developed on this river. The name was coined by Herb Spannagl who noticed its use on the Tongariro and felt it was sufficiently different from other casting techniques. The Tongariro roll cast is used to cast a fly line in situations where there are obstacles behind the caster that obstruct the angler from using traditional fly casting techniques. The Tongariro River has 3 main sections of whitewater; named 'Access 14', 'Access 13' and 'Access 10'. These sections are the most popular on the Tongariro and provide grade 4, 3+ and 3 whitewater respectively. Lesser run sections of grade 2 exist, the first of which runs down to the put-in of Access 14 and the lower section runs from Blue Pool to Turangi. Sections of nearly unpaddleable whitewater fill the two main gorges, Tree Trunk Gorge and Waikato Gorge.

=== Recreational releases ===
The New Zealand Resource Management Act 1991 dictates that as part of mitigation for the loss of recreational amenities on the Tongariro River, Genesis Energy must divert water into natural riverbed for 3 weekends per year. This is purely for recreational enjoyment and separate from any maintenance or flushing flows that are otherwise necessary. The dates for these releases are set in conjunction with the national body WhitewaterNZ and generally are structured such that Access 10 releases are on a Saturday and Access 14/13 are on the Sunday of the same weekend. Flows of 30 cubic metres per second (1,100 cu ft/s) are released from Rangipo Dam for a duration of 8 hours. Flows of 30 cumecs are released from the Poutu Intake for 6 hours. The Access 14/13 sections are not able to be paddled without a release from Genesis Energy, due to the fact that the minimum required flow from below Rangipo Dam is negligible in terms of whitewater and the intake structure at Rangipo is able to take huge amounts of water; so if there is extra storm flow in these sections the flow is generally dangerously high. Access 10 is able to be paddled year-round as the minimum flow of 16 cubic metres per second (570 cu ft/s) below Poutu Intake is paddleable - albeit scratchy, and the amount of extra water able to be taken during storm events at Poutu Intake is relatively small so water is often spilled into the river.

== See also ==
- Waikato River
- List of pools of the Tongariro River
