= Taupō District =

- District
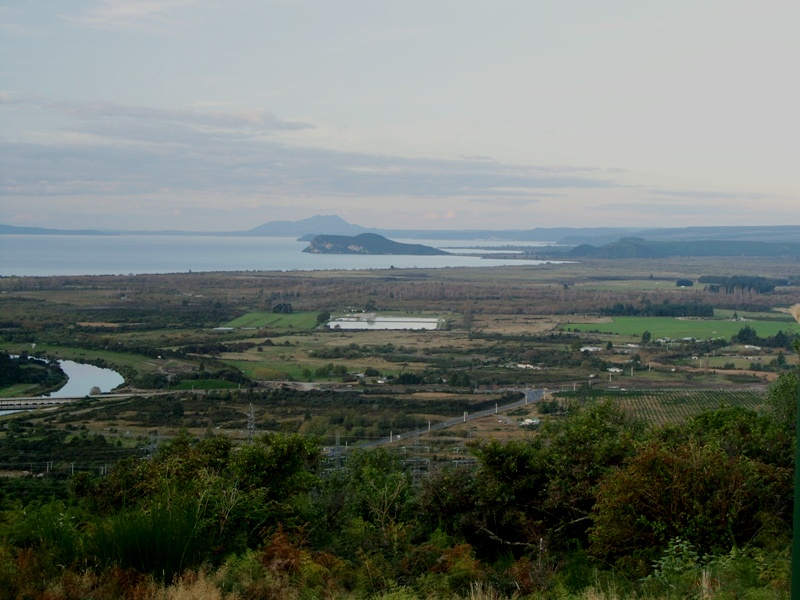
- Eastern Lake Taupō, Tūrangi to Taupō

- Taupō district within the North Island
- Coordinates: 38°52′01″S 176°04′01″E
- Country: New Zealand
- Regions: Waikato (majority); Bay of Plenty (part); Hawke's Bay (part); Manawatū–Whanganui (part)
- Wards: Mangakino-Pouakani Ward; Taupō Ward; Turangi-Tongariro Ward; Taupō East Rural Ward; Te Papamārearea Māori Ward
- Main towns and settlements: Taupō, Kinloch, Tūrangi, Mangakino

Government
  - Mayor: John Funnell
  - Parliamentary electorate: Taupō
  - Territorial authority: Taupō District Council

Area
  - Land: 6,333.00 km^{2} (2,445.18 sq mi)

Population (June 2025)
  - Total: 42,700
  - Density: 6.74/km^{2} (17.5/sq mi)
- Time zone: UTC+12 (NZST)
  - Summer (DST): UTC+13 (NZDT)
- Postcode(s): Map of postcodes
- Area code: 07
- Website: www.taupodc.govt.nz

Taupō District is a territorial authority district in New Zealand. It covers 6,333 km^{2} of land, and a further 610 km^{2} of lake area, including Lake Taupō, New Zealand's largest lake, and Lake Rotoaira. The district stretches from the small town of Mangakino in the northwest to the Tongariro National Park in the south, and east into the Kaingaroa Forest. The district's population is largely located in the two main centres, Taupō and Tūrangi.

== Local government ==
The district is governed by Taupō District Council. The vast majority of the district also falls within the jurisdiction of Waikato Regional Council, although parts are within the jurisdiction of the Bay of Plenty Regional Council and Manawatū-Whanganui Regional Council, and a tiny sliver is within the territory of the Hawke's Bay Regional Council.

== History ==
Little is known about early Māori settlement near Taupō, although Ngāti Tūwharetoa have been the main iwi of the area for several hundred years. Major pā were situated at the southern end of the lake, to the west of the modern town of Tūrangi.

Taupo town was founded in 1869 as a garrison town during the New Zealand Wars, but remained small due to the poor volcanic soils of the region. It was not until the 1950s that the region started to develop, with forestry and the construction of the Wairakei geothermal power station.

== Population ==
Taupo District covers 6,333.00 km^{2} (2,445.18 sq mi) and had an estimated population of 42,700 as of June 2025, with a population density of 6.7 people per km^{2}. There are 27,000 people in the Taupō urban area, 3,960 people in the Tūrangi urban area, and 11,740 people in other settlements and in rural areas.

Historical population
Year	Pop.	±% p.a.
2006	32,418	—
2013	32,907	+0.21%
2018	37,203	+2.48%
2023	40,296	+1.61%

Taupo District had a population of 40,296 in the 2023 New Zealand census, an increase of 3,093 people (8.3%) since the 2018 census, and an increase of 7,389 people (22.5%) since the 2013 census. There were 20,148 males, 20,049 females and 96 people of other genders in 15,339 dwellings. 2.3% of people identified as LGBTIQ+. The median age was 42.3 years (compared with 38.1 years nationally). There were 7,545 people (18.7%) aged under 15 years, 6,393 (15.9%) aged 15 to 29, 18,048 (44.8%) aged 30 to 64, and 8,310 (20.6%) aged 65 or older.

People could identify as more than one ethnicity. The results were 74.9% European (Pākehā); 30.9% Māori; 3.7% Pasifika; 6.5% Asian; 0.8% Middle Eastern, Latin American and African New Zealanders (MELAA); and 2.6% other, which includes people giving their ethnicity as "New Zealander". English was spoken by 97.1%, Māori language by 8.0%, Samoan by 0.4% and other languages by 7.5%. No language could be spoken by 1.8% (e.g. too young to talk). New Zealand Sign Language was known by 0.5%. The percentage of people born overseas was 17.8, compared with 28.8% nationally.

Religious affiliations were 28.7% Christian, 1.3% Hindu, 0.3% Islam, 4.4% Māori religious beliefs, 0.6% Buddhist, 0.4% New Age, 0.1% Jewish, and 1.4% other religions. People who answered that they had no religion were 55.3%, and 7.8% of people did not answer the census question.

Of those at least 15 years old, 4,308 (13.2%) people had a bachelor's or higher degree, 19,140 (58.4%) had a post-high school certificate or diploma, and 7,995 (24.4%) people exclusively held high school qualifications. The median income was $39,800, compared with $41,500 nationally. 3,141 people (9.6%) earned over $100,000 compared to 12.1% nationally. The employment status of those at least 15 was that 16,242 (49.6%) people were employed full-time, 4,683 (14.3%) were part-time, and 783 (2.4%) were unemployed.

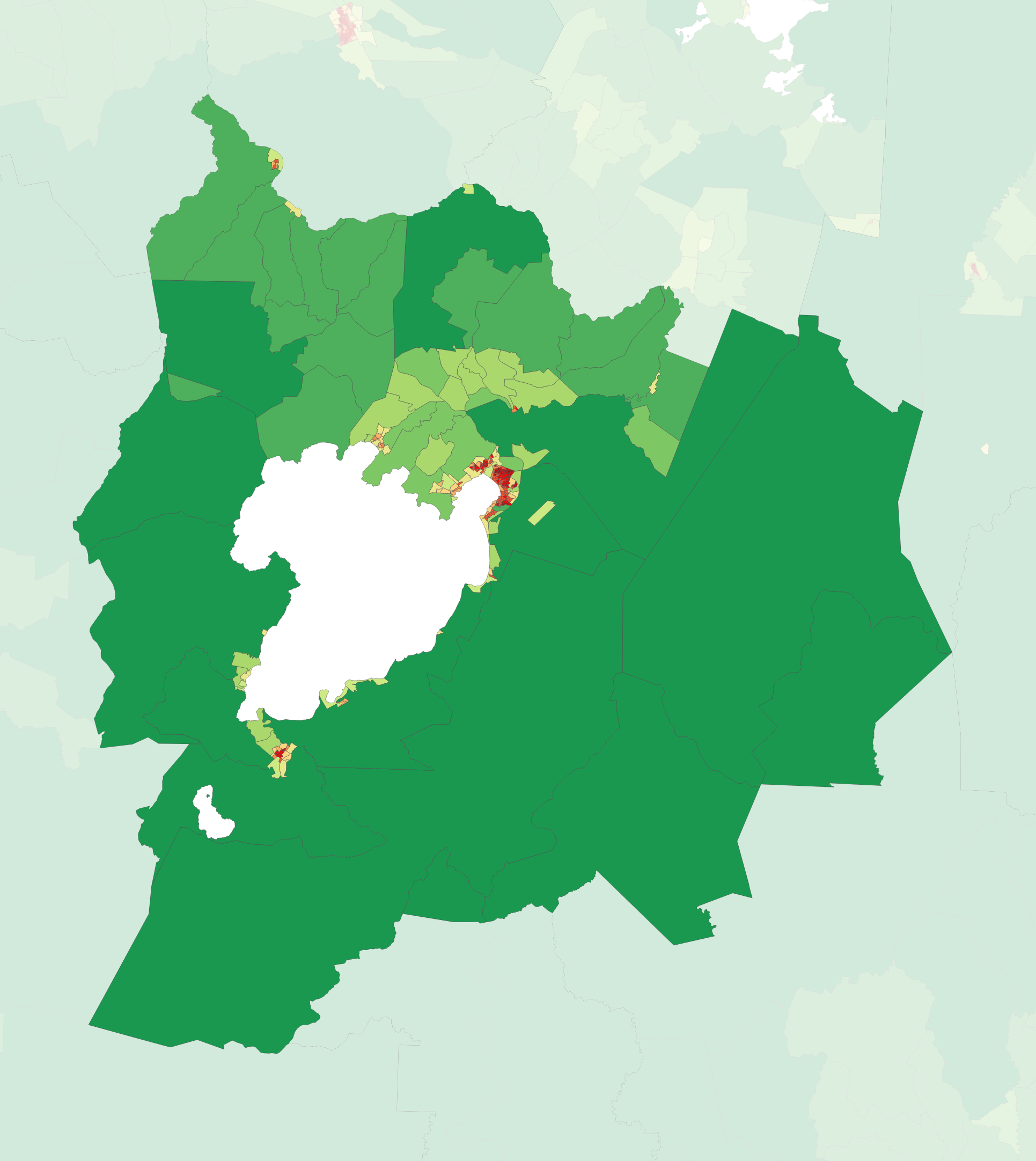
Population density in the 2023 census

Individual wards
Name	Area (km^{2})	Population	Density (per km^{2})	Dwellings	Median age	Median income
Mangakino-Pouakani General Ward	1,234.39	2,817	2.3	1,062	37.9 years	$38,000
Taupō General Ward	213.33	28,491	133.6	10,866	43.1 years	$41,800
Turangi-Tongariro General Ward	2,078.58	5,841	2.8	2,277	44.1 years	$29,100
Taupō East Rural General Ward	2,806.70	3,147	1.1	1,137	37.2 years	$46,900
New Zealand					38.1 years	$41,500

== Image gallery ==
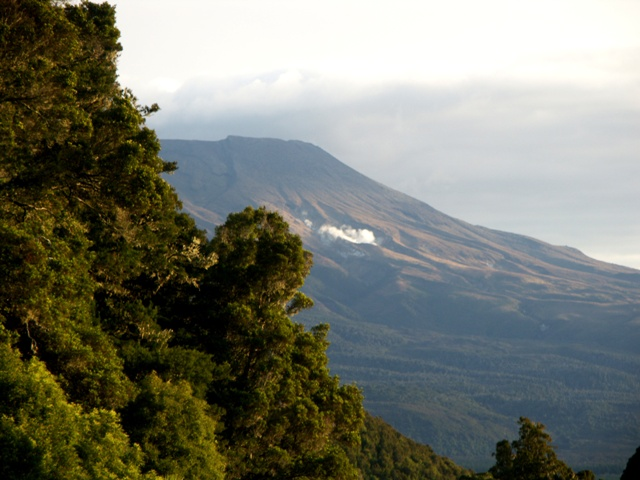
Ketetahi Springs

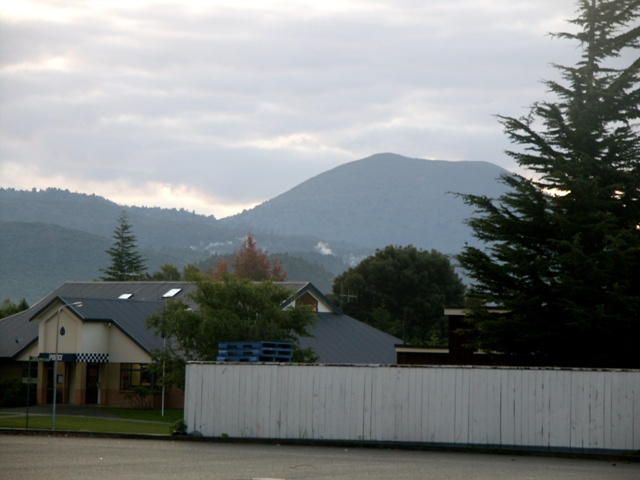
Western Taupō steam and hot springs

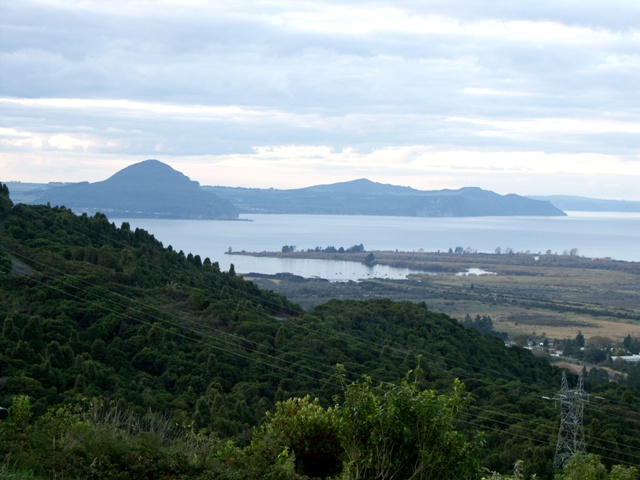
Western Taupō looking north
