= Taupō District Council =

Coordinates: 38.701°S 175.983°E

Type
- Type: Territorial authority

History
- Founded: 1989

Leadership
- Mayor: John Funnell

Website
- www.taupodc.govt.nz

Taupō District Council is the territorial authority for the Taupō District of New Zealand's North Island. It serves as the district's local government, with the Waikato Regional Council, the Bay of Plenty Regional Council, the Hawke's Bay Regional Council, and Horizons Regional Council serving as the regional authorities. It has existed since 1st December 1988.

The council has 12 councillors and is chaired by the mayor of Taupō (currently John Funnell since October 2025).

== Regional councils ==
The district falls within the jurisdiction of four different regional councils; however the vast majority (73.74% by land area) of the district falls within the jurisdiction of the Waikato Regional Council. The exceptions are the towns of Rangitaiki (14.31% of the district's land area), which lies within the Bay of Plenty region, Taharua (11.26%), which lies within the Hawke's Bay Region, and Te More (0.69%), which lies within the Manawatū-Whanganui region. Taupō is unique in being the only district in New Zealand so divided; no other district is divided between/among more than two regions, and most are not divided at all.

== Council ==
The Taupō District has 12 councillors and a mayor.

=== Mayor ===
The office of mayor of Taupō was established in 1989 as part of the 1989 local government reforms. Since 2025, the mayor of Taupō has been John Funell.

=== Deputy Mayor ===
Taupō District deputy mayor is Kevin Taylor who was formally appointed to the role of deputy mayor on 28 October 2022.

=== Councillors ===
==== Taupō ward ====
- Kevin Taylor (deputy mayor)
- Duncan Campbell
- Anna Park
- Christine Rankin
- Rachel Shepherd
- Yvonne Westerman
- John Williamson

==== Taupō East Rural ward ====
- Kylie Leonard

==== Mangakino ward ====
- Kirsty Trueman

==== Turangi-Tongariro ward ====
- Sandra Greenslade

==== Te Papamārearea Māori ward ====
- Karam Fletcher
- Danny Loughlin

== Elections ==
- 1988
- 1989
- 1992
- 1995
- 1998
- 2001
- 2004
- 2007
- 2010
- 2013
- 2016
- 2019
- 2022
- 2025
