= Mayor of Taupō =

- Incumbent; John Funnell since 2025
- Style: His/Her Worship
- Term length: Three years, renewable
- Inaugural holder: Joan Williamson
- Formation: 1989
- Salary: $143,105
- Website: Official website

The mayor of Taupō officiates over the Taupō District Council.

The mayor of Taupō is the head of the municipal government, and presides over the district council. The mayor is directly elected using a first-past-the-post electoral system. The office was established on 1 December 1989, after the formation of the district council in the 1989 local government reforms. John Funnell is the current mayor of Taupō.

== List of office holders ==
=== Mayors ===
Taupō District has had five mayors. The following is a complete list:

	Name	Portrait	Term
1	Joan Williamson		1989–2001
2	Clayton Stent		2001–2007
3	Rick Cooper		2007–2013
4	David Trewavas		2013–2025
5	John Funnell		2025–present

=== Deputy mayors ===
Name	Term	Mayor
Rex Hawkins	1992–1998	Williamson
Joe Keehan	1998–2001	Williamson
Christine McElwee	2001–2004	Stent
David Trewavas	2004–2007	Stent
Christine McElwee	2007–2009	Cooper
Don Ormsby	2010	Cooper
Mike Downard	2010–2013	Cooper
Keith Crate	2013–2014	Trewavas
Barry Hickling	2014–2016	Trewavas
Rosie Harvey	2016–2019	Trewavas
Christine Rankin	2019–2022	Trewavas
Kevin Taylor	2022-2025	Trewavas
Kevin Taylor	2025–present	Trewavas
Kevin Taylor	2025–present	Funnell
