= Te Heuheu =

Te Heuheu may refer to several people from the Te Heuheu family which has provided chiefs of the Māori Ngati Tuwharetoa iwi (tribe) for approximately 200 years. The name is also used for several landmarks in the central North Island of New Zealand:

== People ==
- Herea Te Heuheu Tūkino I (c. 1750–1820), first in the line of the Te Heuheu chiefs
- Mananui Te Heuheu Tūkino II (died 1846), son of Tūkino I
- Iwikau Te Heuheu Tūkino III (died 1862), brother of Tūkino II
- Horonuku or Patātai Te Heuheu Tūkino IV (1821–1888), son of Tūkino II
- Tūreiti Te Heuheu Tūkino V (c. 1865–1921), son of Tūkino IV
- Hoani Te Heuheu Tūkino VI (1897–1944), son of Tūkino V
- Sir Hepi Te Heuheu Tūkino VII, KBE (1919–1997), Te Heuheu Tūkino VII, son of Tūkino VI
- Sir Tumu Te Heuheu Tūkino VIII, KNZM (1941–2025), Te Heuheu Tūkino VIII, son of Tūkino VII
- Hon. Dame Georgina te Heuheu, DNZM QSO (born 1943), a former member of Parliament in New Zealand and Cabinet Minister
- Gerrard Te Rangimaheu Te Heuheu Tūkino IX (born 1969/1970), current chief of Ngāti Tūwharetoa

== Places ==
- Te Heuheu, a peak on Mount Ruapehu in the Tongariro National Park on the North Island of New Zealand
