= Tū-te-tawhā =

Tū-te-tawhā may refer to:

- Tū-te-tawhā (son of Taringa), a seventeenth century chief of Ngāti Tūwharetoa
- Tū-te-tawhā Whare-oneone, his grandson, also a chief of Ngāti Tūwharetoa
- Ngāti Tutetawhā, a hapu of Ngāti Tūwharetoa, descended from the latter.
