= Manunui =

Manunui Mananui (Māori)
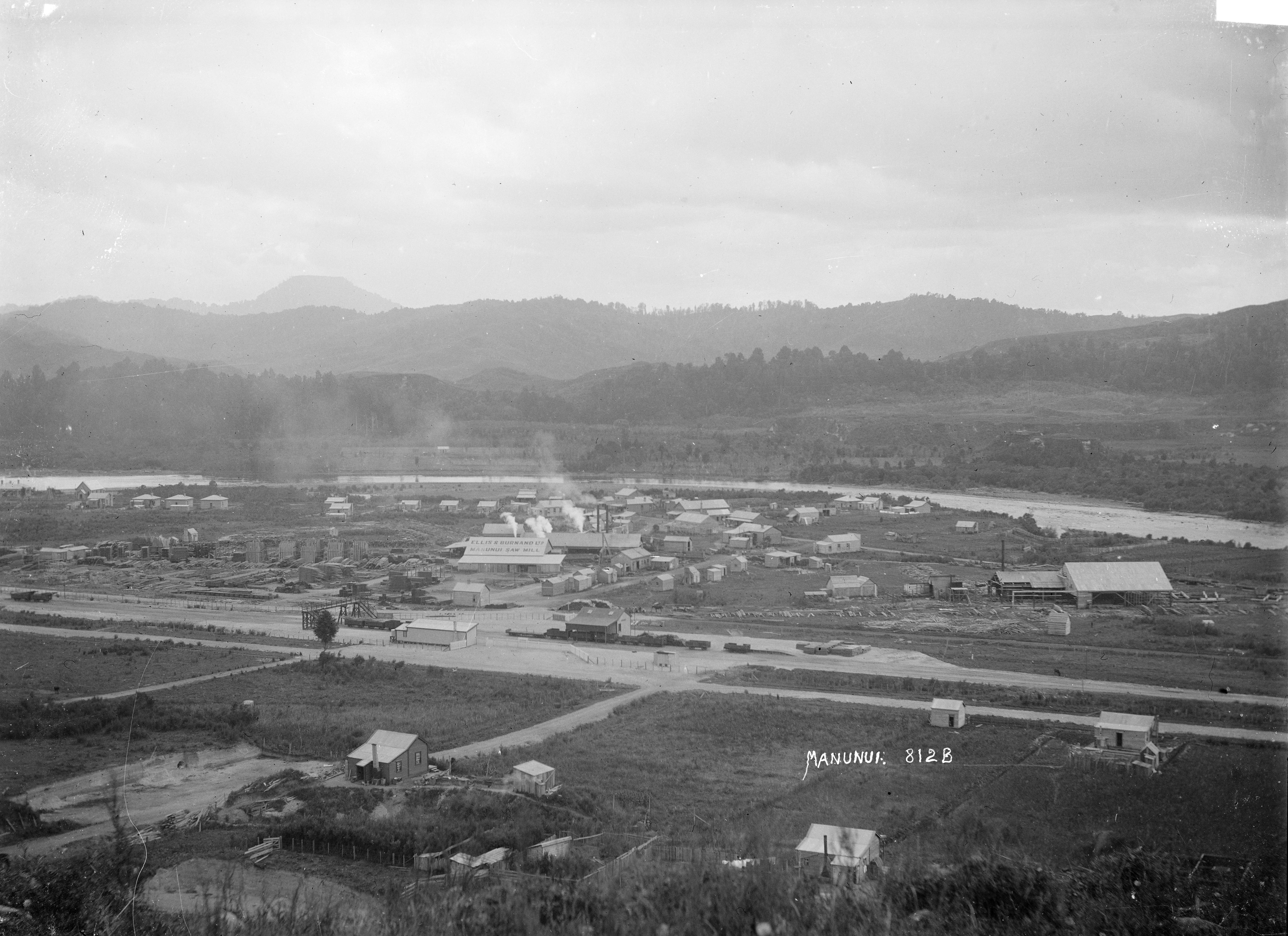
- Manunui c. 1908–1915, showing the Ellis and Burnand sawmill
- Etymology: Corruption of the Māori Mananui, meaning great mana, referring to the mana of Paparangi.
- Location of Manunui in New Zealand
- Coordinates: 38.896°S 175.324°E
- Country: New Zealand
- Region: Manawatū-Whanganui
- District: Ruapehu District
- Elevation: 200 m (660 ft)

Manunui (Māori: Mananui) is a small Whanganui River settlement, about 6 kilometres (3.7 mi) east of Taumarunui on State Highway 4, in New Zealand's King Country. It was once known as Waimarino, but John Burnand of the Ellis and Burnand sawmilling firm renamed it Manunui around 1905.

== History ==
Ellis and Burnand opened a sawmill in Manunui in 1901, specialising in milling kahikatea to make boxes of its odourless wood for the butter export industry. After the North Island Main Trunk Railway reached the settlement in 1903, the mill grew to be the largest in the region. It closed in 1942.

Manunui became a manufacturing and farming centre as the native forest around it was milled and cleared. At one point it was a town district (requiring a population of at least 500; the population was 515 in 1911), but merged back with Taumarunui county in the late 1970s; today is functionally a suburb of Taumarunui.

== Marae ==
Manunui is the home of the Ngāti Hinemihi and Ngāti Manunui hapū of the iwi Ngāti Tūwharetoa.

- Maniaiti Marae and Te Aroha o Ngā Mātua Tūpuna meeting house also have affiliations with the Ngāti Hāua hapū of Ngāti Hekeāwai and Ngāti Hāua, and with the Ngāti Tūwharetoa.
- Matua Kore Marae and its Matua Kore meeting house is affiliated with the Ngāti Hāua hapū of Ngāti Hāuaroa, Ngāti Hinewai and Ngāti Poutama.

== Education ==
Manunui School is a co-educational state primary school for Year 1 to 8 students, with a roll of 136 as of July 2026.

== Notable people ==
- Kura Te Whiria Ensor (1925–2015), Māori fashion entrepreneur

== See also ==
- Manunui railway station
- Ruapehu District
