= Georgina te Heuheu =

New Zealand politician

The Honourable Dame Georgina te Heuheu DNZM QSO
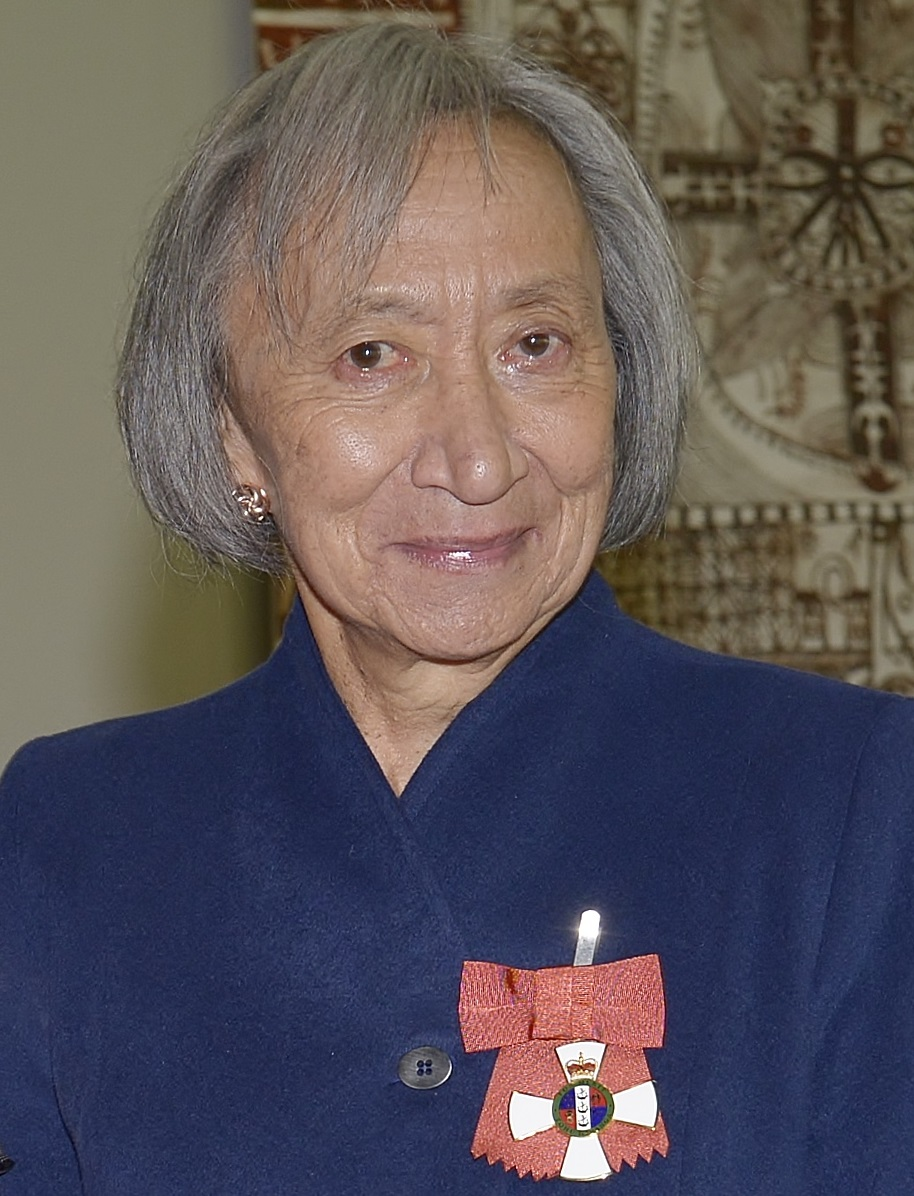
- Te Heuheu in 2018

3rd Minister for Courts
- In office 31 August 1998 – 10 December 1999
- Prime Minister: Jenny Shipley
- Preceded by: Wyatt Creech
- Succeeded by: Matt Robson
- In office 19 November 2008 – 12 December 2011
- Prime Minister: John Key
- Preceded by: Rick Barker
- Succeeded by: Chester Borrows

Minister of Pacific Island Affairs
- In office 19 November 2008 – 12 December 2011
- Prime Minister: John Key
- Preceded by: Winnie Laban
- Succeeded by: Hekia Parata

Member of the New Zealand Parliament for National Party List
- In office 1996–2011

Personal details
- Born: Georgina Manunui; 1943 (age 82–83) Taurewa, New Zealand
- Party: National Party
- Spouse: Timi te Heuheu (d. 2012)
- Relations: Tumu te Heuheu (brother-in-law); Hepi Te Heuheu (father-in-law)
- Children: 2
- Education: Victoria University of Wellington
- Occupation: Lawyer

Dame Georgina Manunui te Heuheu DNZM QSO (née Manunui, born 1943) is a New Zealand National Party politician. She was a Member of Parliament (MP) between 1996 and 2011, and a Cabinet Minister in the New Zealand Government.

== Early life ==
Born Georgina Manunui in 1943, she is the daughter of George Manunui of Waitahanui. She is a member of the Ngāti Tuwharetoa tribe of the central North Island and is also related to Te Arawa and Tuhoe tribes. She was born and raised at Taurewa, near Mount Tongariro, and received her secondary schooling at Turakina Maori Girls' College (1956–59) and Auckland Girls' Grammar School (1960–61).

She graduated from Victoria University of Wellington with a BA in English and an LLB, being the first Māori woman to gain a law degree and be admitted to the High Court as barrister and solicitor.

== Professional life ==
Before being elected to Parliament, te Heuheu practised law in Wellington and Rotorua. She was a member of the Waitangi Tribunal (1986–96).

== Member of Parliament ==
New Zealand Parliament
Years	Term	Electorate	List	Party
1996–1999	45th	List	7	National
1999–2002	46th	List	6	National
2002–2005	47th	List	6	National
2005–2008	48th	List	19	National
2008–2011	49th	List	17	National

Georgina te Heuheu was first elected to Parliament in 1996.

She was the Minister for Courts and for Women's Affairs (1998–1999) during the Fourth National Party Government.

Speculation about her future arose in 2004 after she criticised then leader Don Brash's Orewa Speech. Questioned some weeks later, she refused to rule out the possibility that she might switch allegiance to the new Māori Party, which had formed after the resignation of Tariana Turia.

However she remained with National for the 2005 election and served as a backbencher for the party, serving as a Spokeswoman for Broadcasting, Associate Spokeswoman for Defence, Treaty of Waitangi Issues and Māori Affairs (Māori Development).

From 19 November 2008 until the 2011 election she was the Minister for Courts, Minister of Pacific Island Affairs, Minister of Disarmament and Arms Control, and Associate Minister of Māori Affairs in the National Party Government led by John Key. Te Heuheu announced she would retire at the 2011 election.

== Life after Parliament ==
Te Heuheu was appointed chairwoman of Māori Television in 2012 and now also sits on several Māori Trust Boards and Charity Committees including the Tuwharetoa Māori Trust Board. In her capacity as chairwoman she has been leading a review of Māori Television services and its operational structure to see whether better outcomes can be achieved for the station.

== Private life ==
She married Timoti ("Timi") te Heuheu, brother of Sir Tumu te Heuheu, a Ngāti Tuwharetoa leader and son of Sir Hepi Te Heuheu. He died in 2012. They had two sons.

== Honours ==
In the 1993 Queen's Birthday Honours, te Heuheu was appointed a Companion of the Queen's Service Order for public services. In the 2018 New Year Honours, she was appointed a Dame Companion of the New Zealand Order of Merit, for services to the state and Māori.

== See also ==
- First women lawyers around the world
