= Hinemihi (Ngāti Tūwharetoa) =

Hinemihi’s journey
1 Whakatāne
2 Ōpepe
3 Te Ponanga-o-te-hei-o-Hinemihi
4 Motuwhara Island

Hinemihi was a Māori woman of Ngāti Awa from Whakatāne in the Bay of Plenty, who married Tū-te-tawhā of Ngāti Tūwharetoa from the southern part of Lake Taupō, New Zealand. She is the ancestor of the Ngāti Hinemihi hapū of Ngāti Tūwharetoa. Te Ponanga saddle between Lake Taupō and Lake Rotoaira is named for an incident in her life. She probably lived in the seventeenth century.

== Life ==
Hinemihi grew up at Whakatāne on the Bay of Plenty. She had one brother, Tū-hereua, an elder sister called Hine-aro, and a younger sister called Te Aki-pare.

=== Te Ponanga-o-te-hei-o-Hinemihi ===
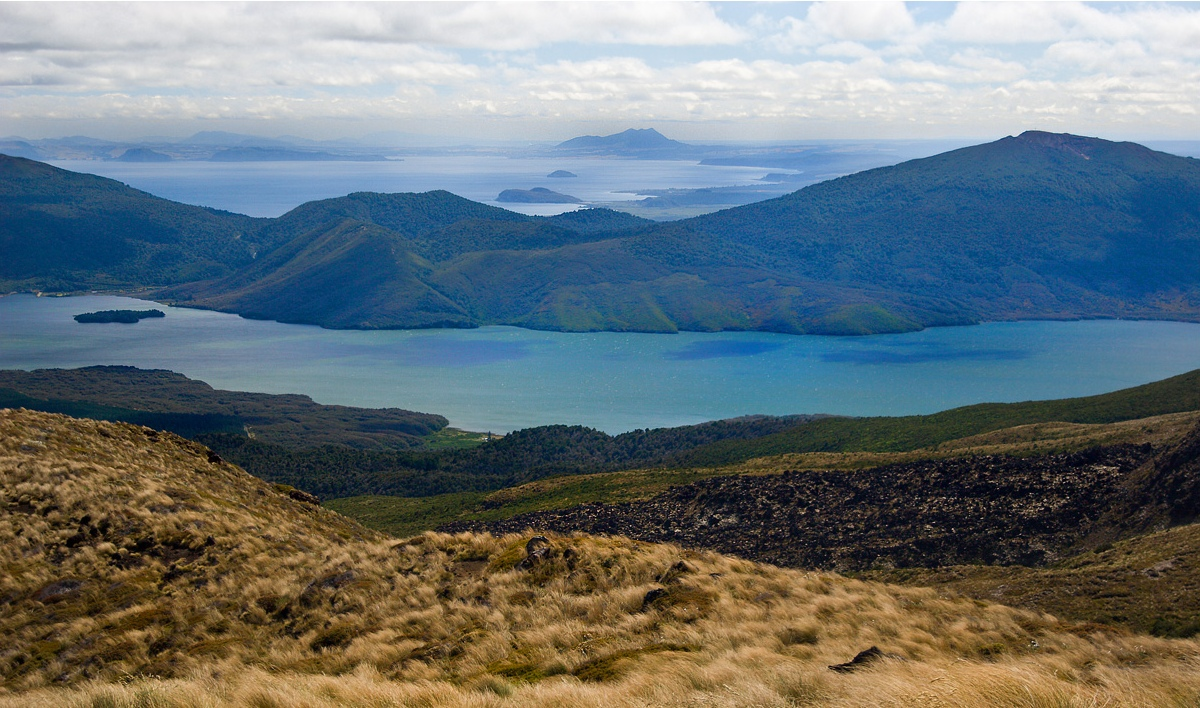
View of Lake Rotoaira, looking north. The Ponanga saddle is left of centre.

One day, Hinemihi's sister Hine-aro came to Whakatāne along with a group of Ngāti Kurapoto, bringing huahua (cooked birds, preserved in their own fat). This was Hinemihi's favourite food, but when she tried to eat some, her brother Tū-hereua grabbed her hand and said "If you like huahua so much, why don’t you go to Taupō and marry Tū-te-tawhā!” Hine-aro and the Ngāti Kurapoto took Hinemihi and a third sister, Te Akipare, back to Ōpepe, where Hine-aro lived with her husband Pakira of Ngāti Poto.

From there, Hinemihi asked to visit Tū-te-tawhā, travelling until she reached the high point of the pass between Lake Taupō and Lake Rotoaira. There she made herself up, in order to make the best impression on Tū-te-tawhā. She combed her hair, put on a korohunga (a cloak with a decorated border) and a paepaeroa (a fine cloak with tāniko borders). Then she doused herself in tarata, tāwhiri, mokimoki, taramea, and tītoki perfumes. Finally, she placed an albatross feather behind her ear and a white heron feather called Te Rau-o-Tītapu (“the feather of the bellbird”) in her hair. The place where she did this was henceforth known as Te Ponanga-o-te-hei-o-Hinemihi ("The Binding of the Necklace of Hinemihi"). From there she went on to Tū-te-tawhā's village and as she approached the people cried out, comparing her to the famous beauty Te Au-o-Karewa, and Tū-te-tawhā married her immediately.

Shortly after this, she and Tū-te-tawhā resettled from Lake Rotoaira, to the Karangahape cliffs at the south end of Lake Taupō, due to disagreements with Ngāti Whitikaupeka, and Tū-te-tawhā built a fortress on Motuwhara Island. Tū-te-tawhā subsequently defeated the Ngāti Whitikaupeka at the Battle of Uwhiuwhi-hiawai, with the help of Hinemihi's brother Tū-hereua.

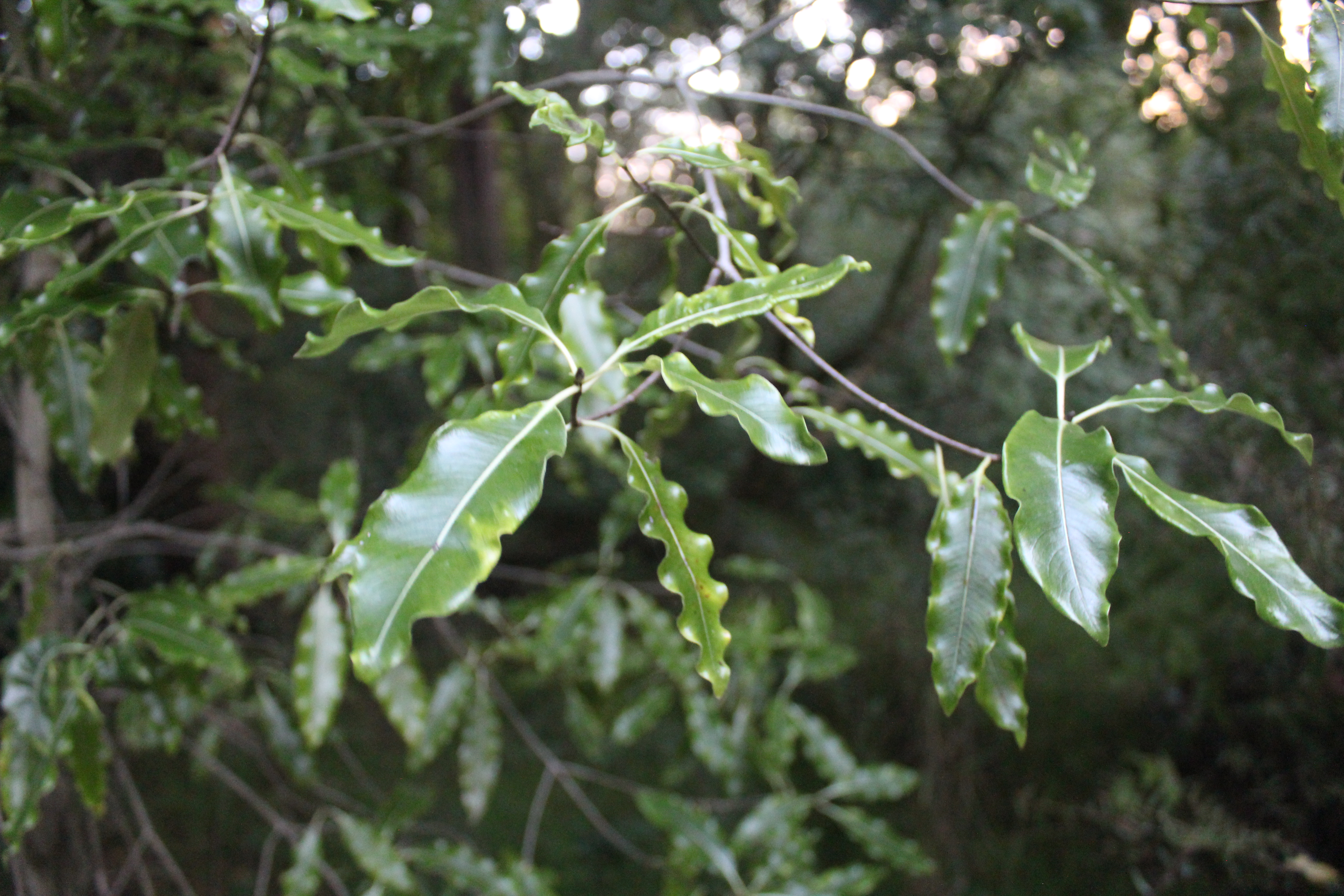
Tarata

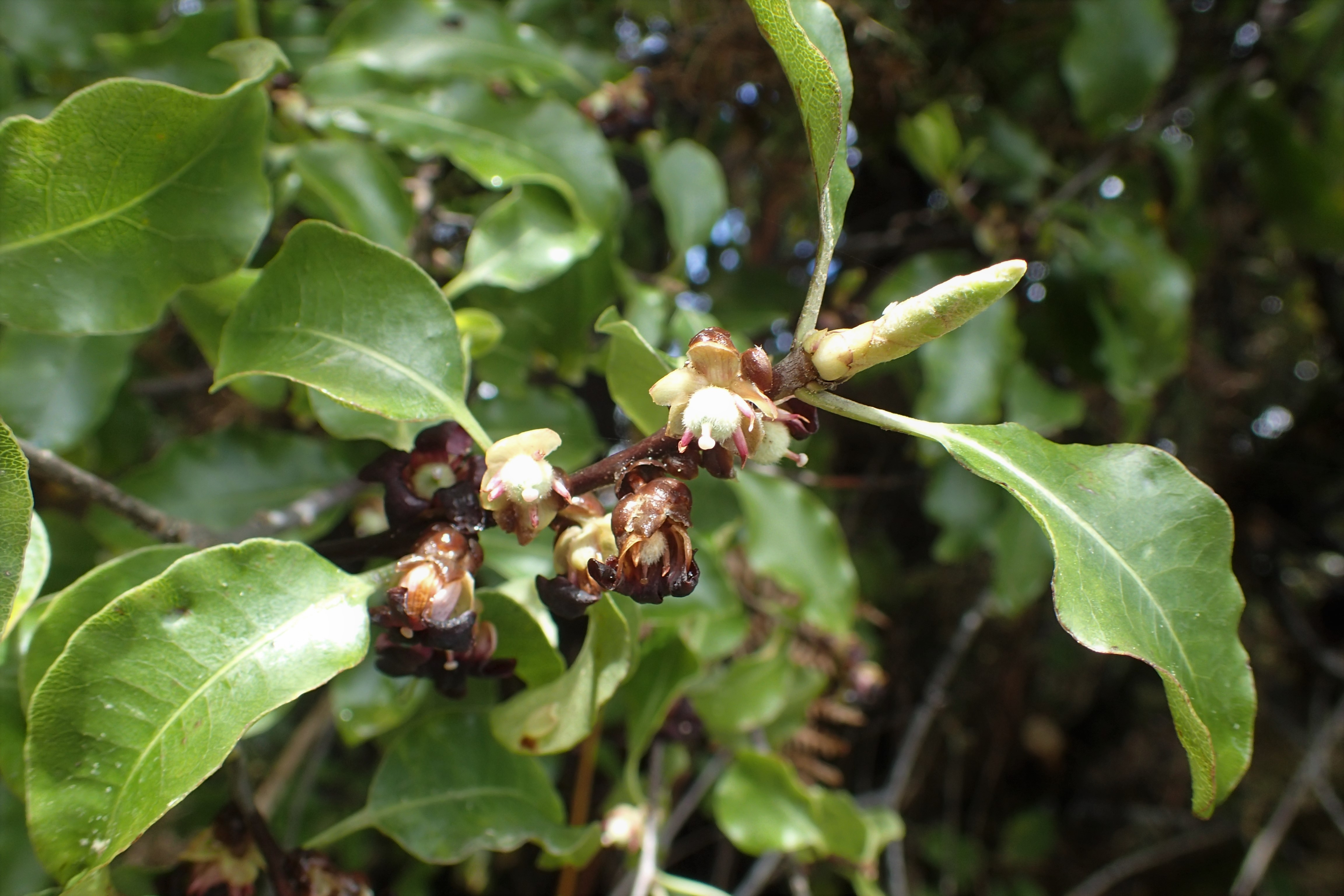
Tāwhiri

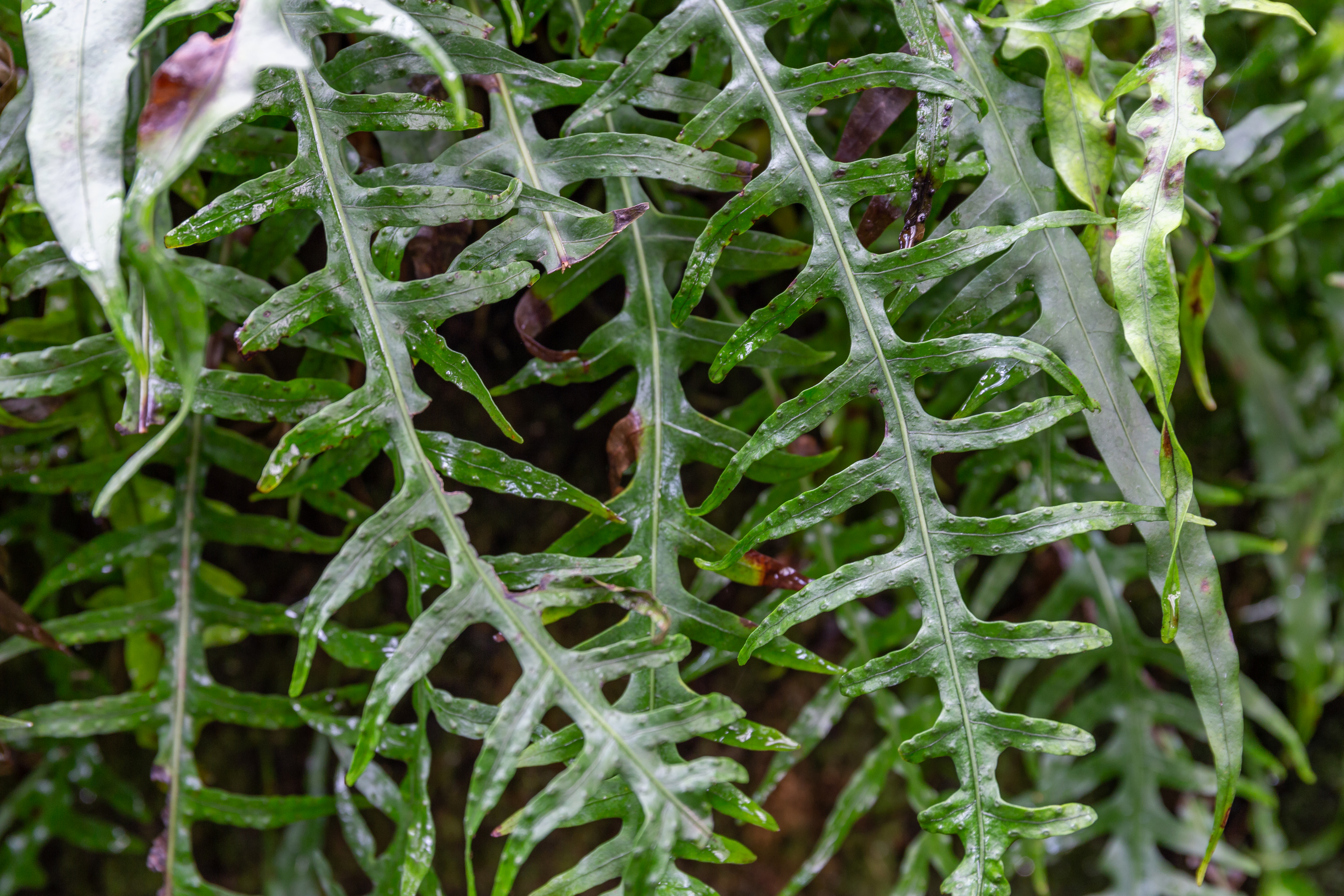
Mokimoki

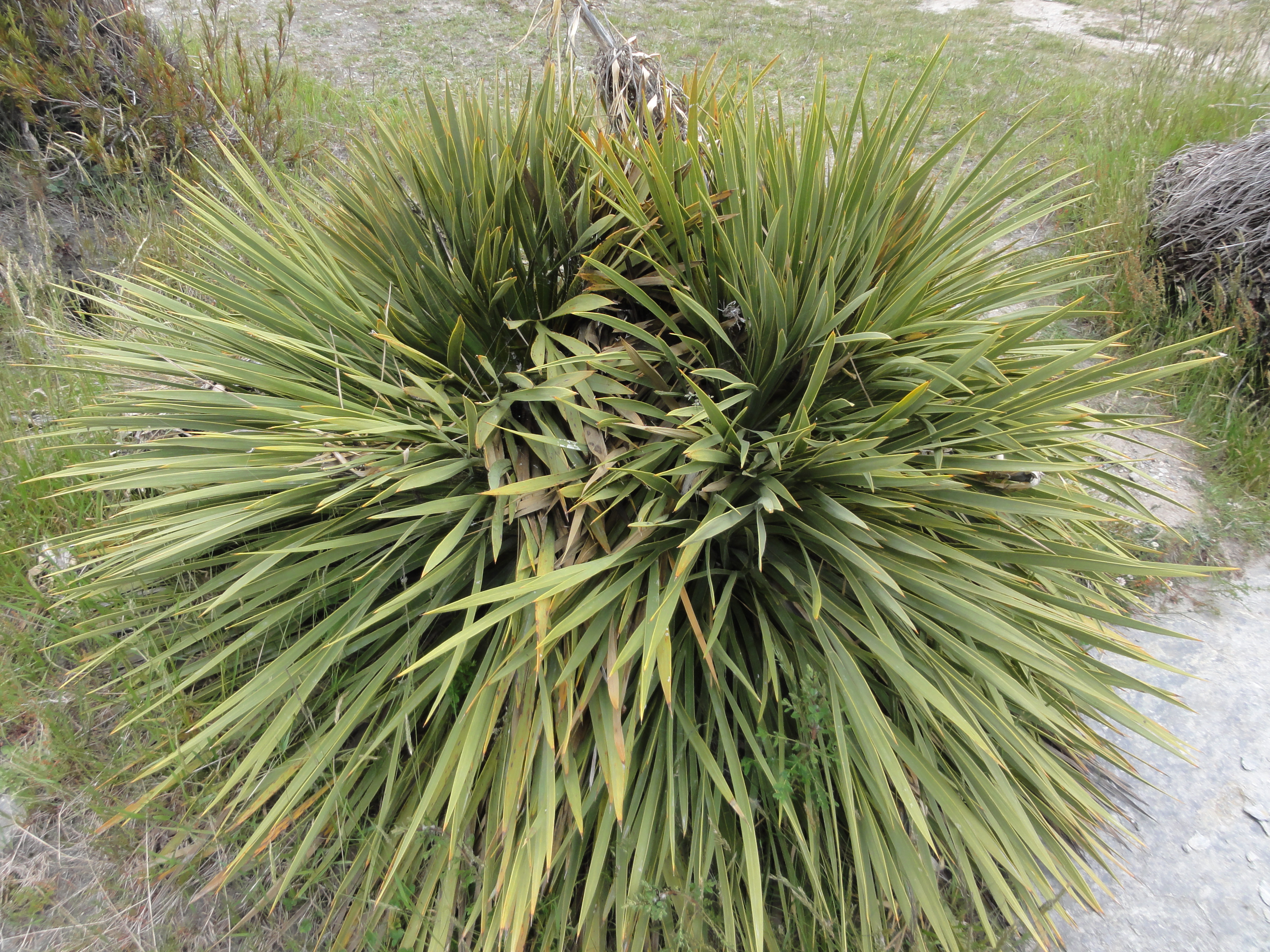
Taramea

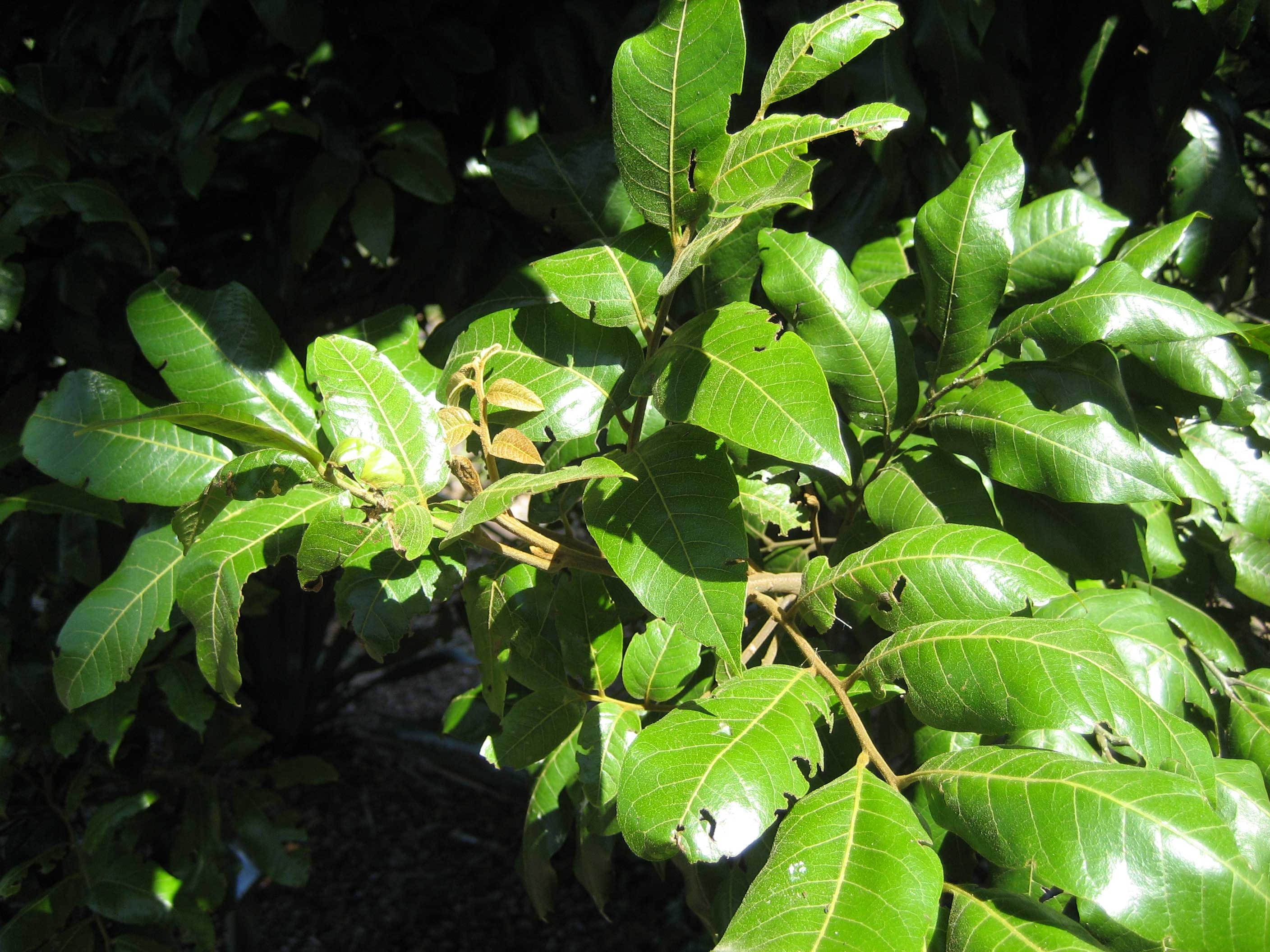
Tītoki

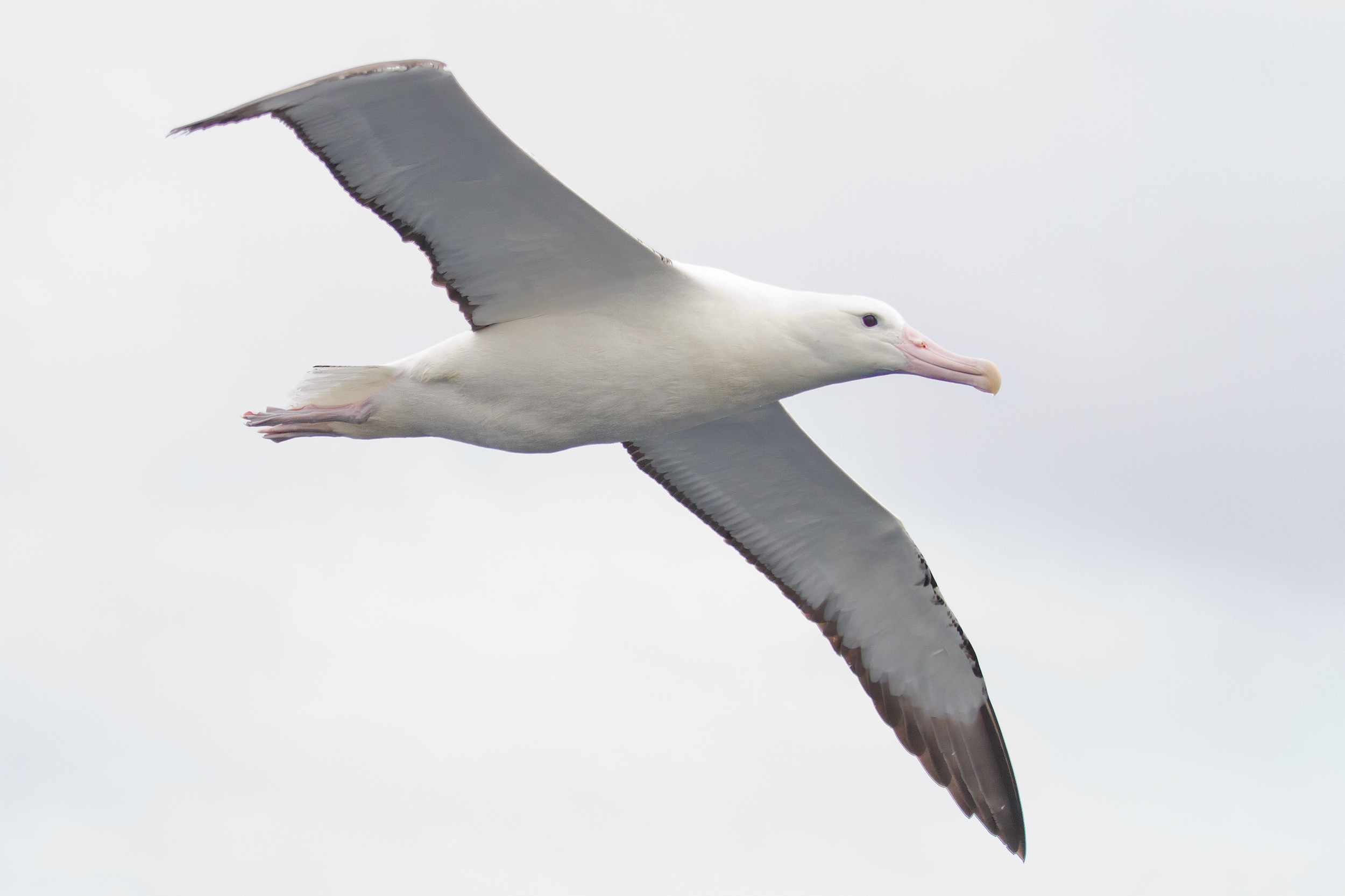
Toroa (albatross)

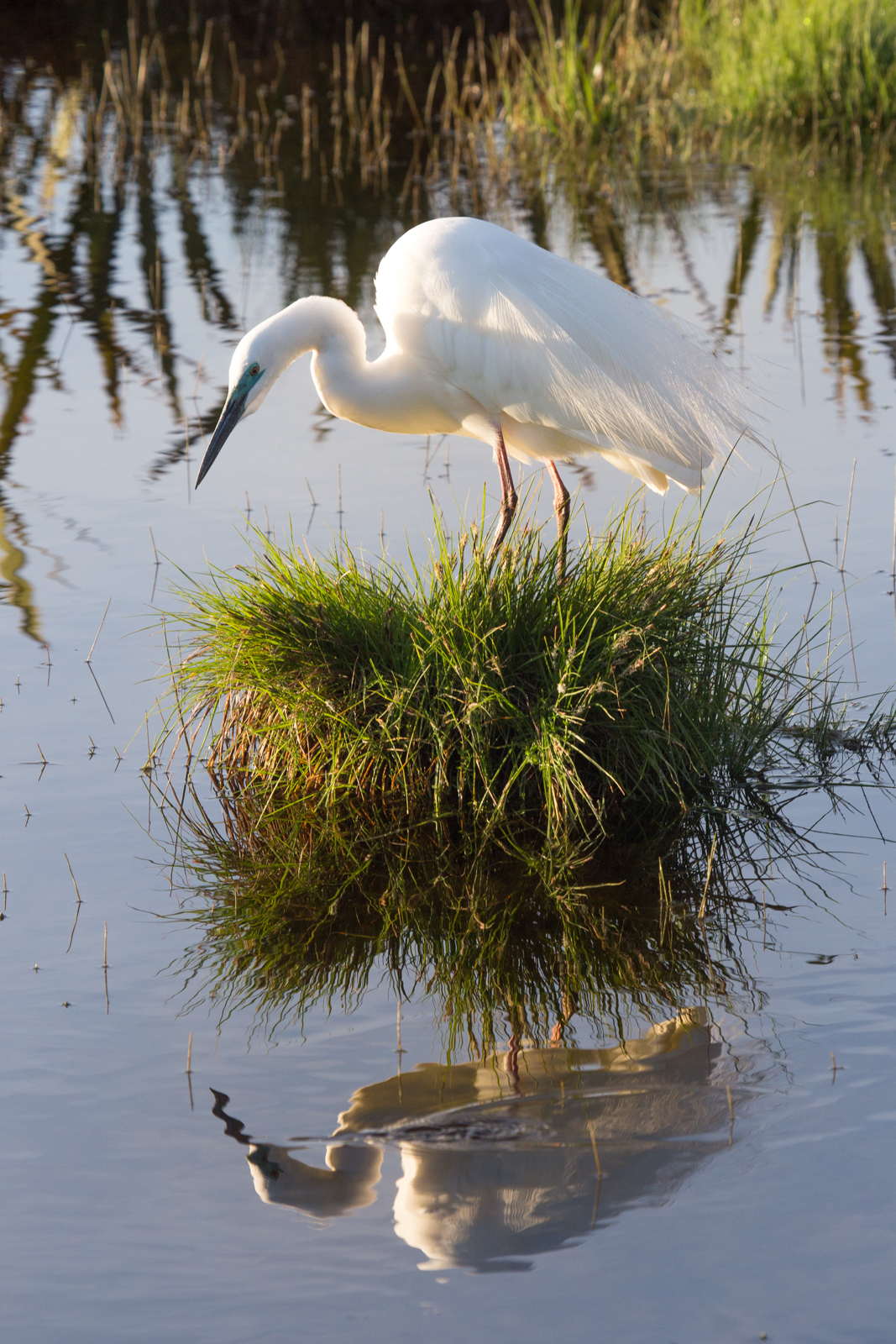
white heron

== Family ==
Hinemihi and Tū-te-tawhā had three sons and one daughter:

- Te Rangi-ita, ancestor of the Ngāti Te Rangiita hapū
- Tuara-kino
- Parapara-hika
- Turu-makina, the ancestor of Ngāti Turumakina, who married her cousin Tukino, grandson of Hinemihi's brother Tū-hereua and was the ancestor of Herea Te Heuheu Tukino I.

== Ngāti Hinemihi ==
The Ngāti Hinemihi hapū of Ngāti Tūwharetoa is descended from Hinemihi. It currently makes use of three marae:

- Kauriki Marae, with the wharenui Te Ōhākī, in Ngāpuke, which is shared with Ngāti Turumakina,
- Maniaiti Marae (Wallace Pā), with the wharenui Te Aroha o Ngā Mātua Tūpuna, which is shared with Ngāti Manunui,
- Petania Marae with the wharenui Hinemihi near Taringamotu, which is shared with the Ngāti Maniapoto hapū of Hinemihi, Parewaeono and Rōrā

== Bibliography ==
- Locke, Samuel (1882). "Historical Traditions of Taupo and East Coast Tribes". Transactions and Proceedings of the Royal Society of New Zealand. 15: 433–459.
- Te Hata, Hoeta; Fletcher, H. J. (1916). "Ngati-Tuhare-toa occupation of Taupo-nui-a-tia". Journal of the Polynesian Society. 25: 104–116, 150–162.
- Grace, John Te Herekiekie (1970) [1959]. Tuwharetoa: The history of the Maori people of the Taupo District. Auckland [N.Z.]: A.H. & A.W. Reed. ISBN 9780589003739.
- McCallum-Haire, Hermione; Te Nana, Rihi; Gallagher, Joanne (2021). "Hihiko O Mangarautawhiri: Power Sovereignty for a Prosperous Whānau and Hapū". Scope: Contemporary Research Topics (Kaupapa Kai Tahu) (6): 33–43. doi:10.34074/scop.2006011. S2CID 244679019.
