= Hinemihi =

Hinemihi may refer to:

- Hinemihi (Ngāti Tūwharetoa) (fl. 17th century), Māori woman of New Zealand
- Hinemihi (whare) in Taumaranui, a Māori meeting house
- Hinemihi (Rotorua marae) at Ngapuna, a Māori communal place and meeting house
