= Te Herekiekie =

New Zealand tribal leader

Te Herekiekie (c. 1810s – 13 June 1861) was a New Zealand tribal leader. Of Māori descent, he identified with the Ngāti Tūwharetoa iwi.
