= Ngāti Pou =

Ngāti Pou may refer to:

- A sub-tribe of Ngāpuhi
- A sub-tribe of Te Uri Taniwha
- A sub-tribe of Ngāti Tūwharetoa
- A sub-tribe of Waikato Tainui
