= Tū-te-tawhā (son of Taringa) =

Māori rangatira (chieftain)

Places in the life of Tū-te-tawhā
1 Lake Rotoaira
2 Pukawa
3 Whareroa
4 Karangahape
5 Hauhangaroa
6 Puke-tapu
7 Motuwhara Island
8 Kuratau (Battle of Uwhi-uwhi-hiawai)

Tū-te-tawhā was a 17th-century Māori rangatira (chieftain) of Ngāti Tūwharetoa from the region around Lake Taupō, New Zealand. He established the border between Ngāti Tūwharetoa and Ngāti Maniapoto to the west. Along with his brother-in-law Tū-hereua, he defeated Ngāti Whitikaupeka in the Battle of Uwhiuwhi-hiawai, but he was subsequently killed in an ill-advised attempt to take the Ngāti Apa fortress of Orangi-te-taea. He is sometimes known as Tū-te-tawhā I to distinguish him from his grandson Tū-te-tawhā Whare-oneone / Tū-te-tawhā II.

== Life ==
Tū-te-tawhā was the son of Taringa and Hinetuki. Through both of his parents, he was a descendant of Tūwharetoa i te Aupōuri. He had a younger brother, Te Rapuhora. Taringa was one of the war leaders during the original Ngāti Tūwharetoa invasion of Taupō.

=== Establishing the border with Ngāti Maniapoto ===
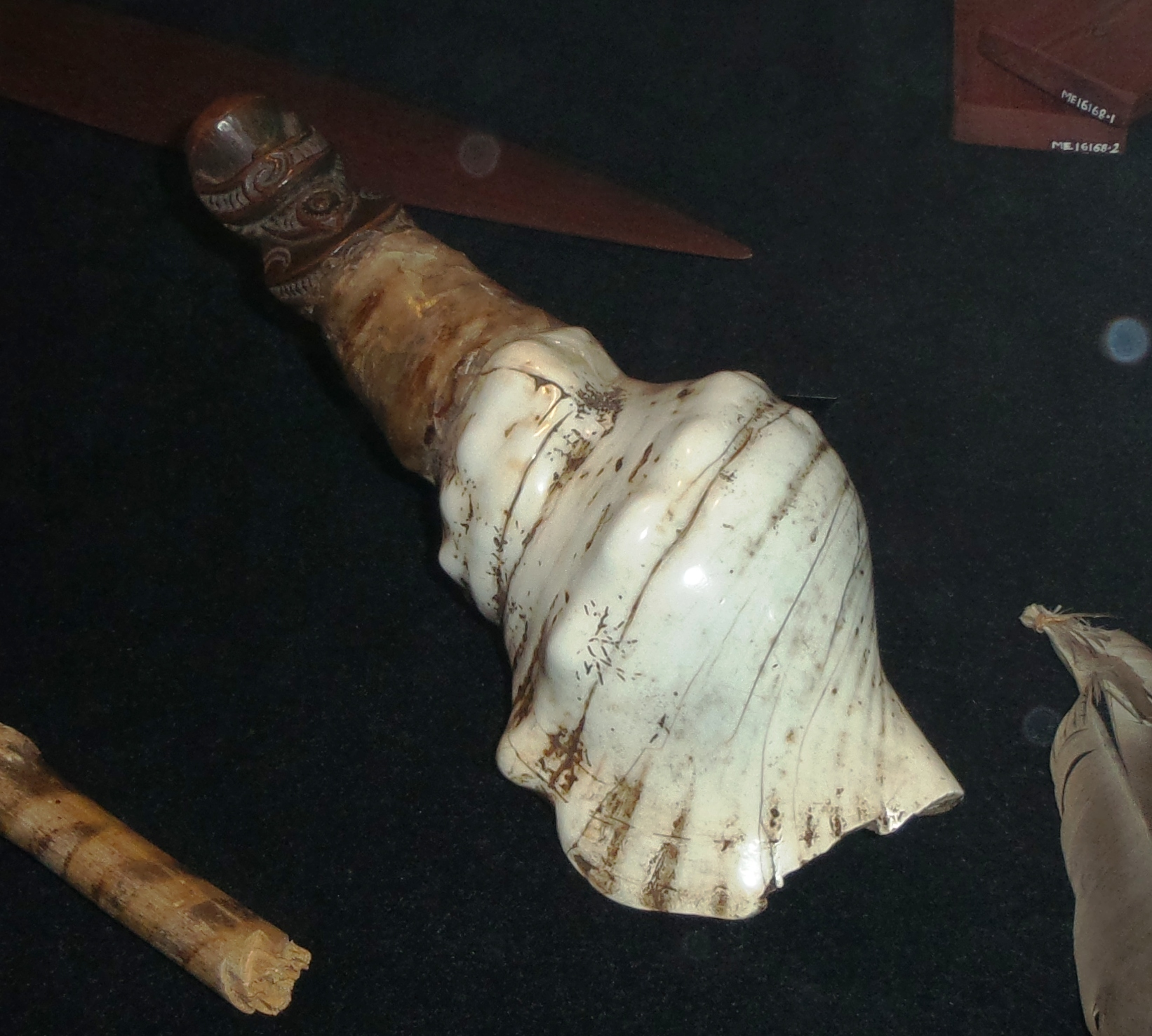
A pūtātara (conch shell trumpet).

When Tū-te-tawhā had become one of the main rangatira of Tūwharetoa and was settled at Lake Rotoaira, he sought to define Tūwharetoa's western border with Ngāti Maniapoto and take possession of the Tūhua region west of Lake Taupō. He set out with his younger brother Te Rapuhoro, travelling along the shore of Lake Taupō via Pukawa, Whare-roa, Karangahape, Hauhunga-roa.

They had made it to Puke-tapu, near modern Taumarunui, when Te Kanawa, the rangatira of Ngāti Maniapoto, blew on his pūtātara (conch shell trumpet), and his mana was so great that Tū-te-tawhā fell over, at the place named Takaputīraha-o-Tū-te-tawhā or Tīrahatanga-o-Tū-te-tawhā (Tū-te-tawhā's fall). All the places on this journey, up to the location of Tū-te-tawhā's fall were subsequently settled by his descendants.

=== Battle of Uwhi-uwhi-hiawai ===
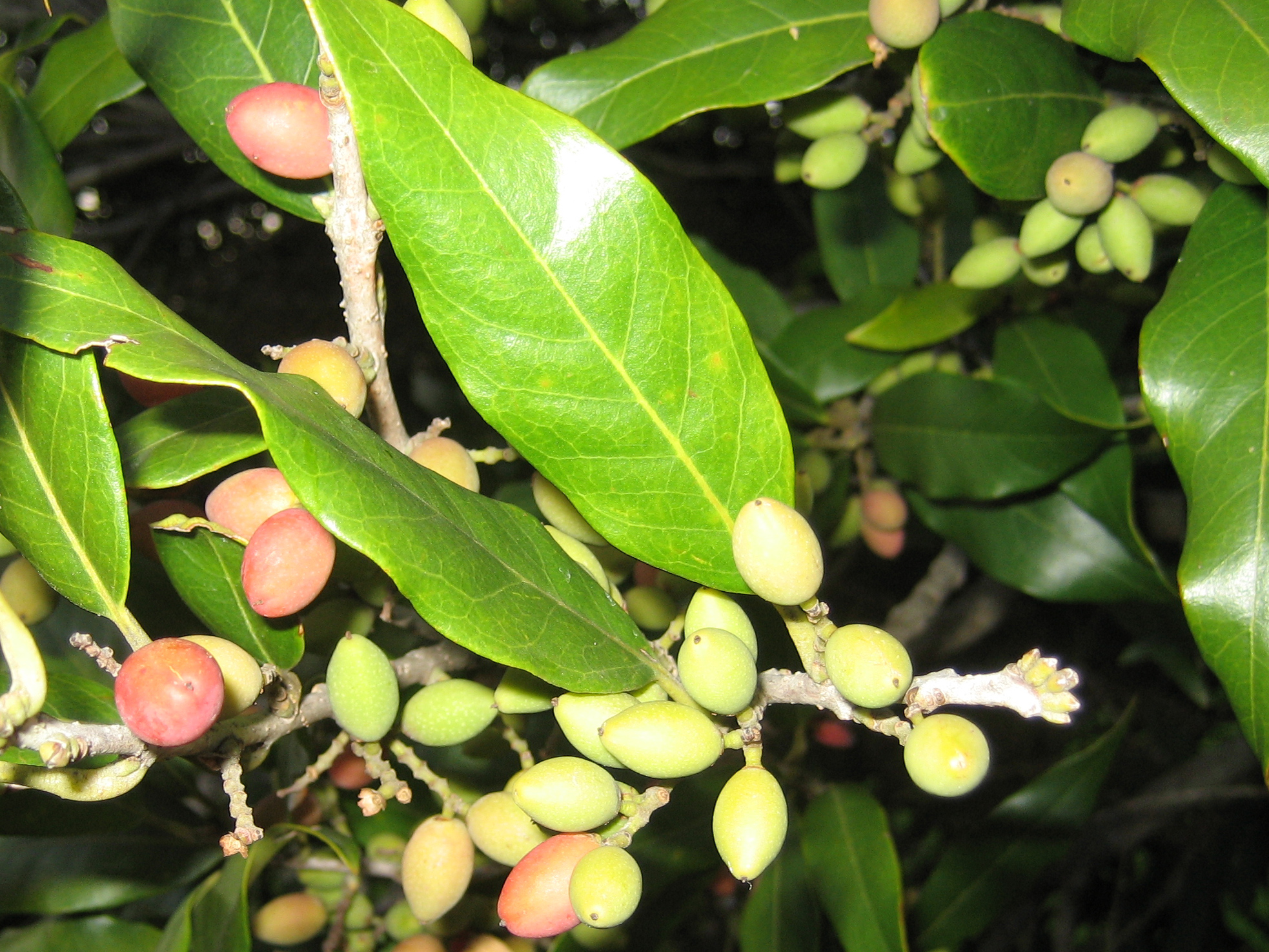
Maire berries.

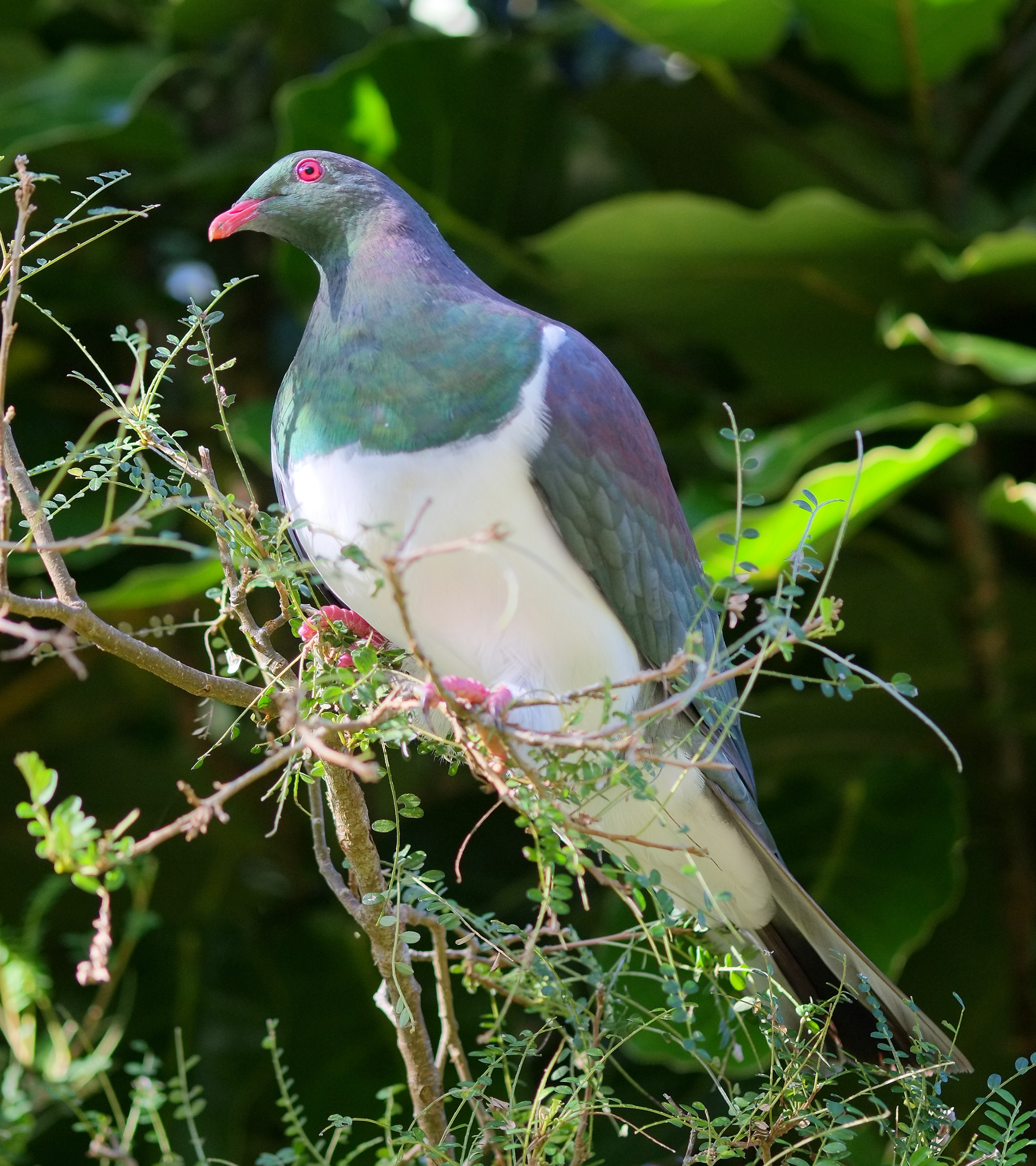
Kererū.

Due to disagreements with Ngāti Whitikaupeka, Tū-te-tawhā subsequently resettled from Lake Rotoaira, to the Karangahape cliffs at the south end of Lake Taupō, where he made his fortress on Motuwhara Island.

Shortly before moving there, Tū-te-tawhā had married Hinemihi, a woman of Ngāti Awa from Whakatane in the Bay of Plenty. After some time, her brother, Tū-hereua decided to visit Hinemihi and meet his new brother-in-law. He arrived when Tū-te-tawhā was away, gathering maire berries and catching kererū at Huahunga-roa, so Hinemihi, her sister Te Ahi-pare, and a few slaves had to welcome Tū-hereua and prepare a feast of fernroot and huahua on their own. Tū-te-tawhā sounded his trumpet, Ngā-tai-o-para-nui, to indicate that he was on his way, and arrived just as the food was being served. Tū-hereua was so taken with the region that he married a lady of Waikato, Wai-pare and settled by Lake Taupō.

Tū-hereua advised Tū-te-tawhā that Motuwhara Island would not be a good location to defend in the event of an attack, so the two of them set out in a canoe to find a new location. They visited various locations under Tū-te-tawhā's control: Whaka-uenuku and Whareroa, but Tū-hereua did not think either of them were suitable. Therefore, Tū-te-tawhā took them to Kuratau, considered a strategic location because it had a bay big enough for several canoes, unaware that it had been occupied by Ngāti Whitikaupeka.

As they came in, Tū-te-tawhā noticed the enemy, already rowing towards them, so he leapt out of the canoe, grabbed the bows of two enemy canoes, one in each hand, and pushed them back to shore. Tū-hereua leapt to the shore with his taiaha and struck a man dead, shouting "The first fish is mine!" (nāku¬ te ika tuatahi), while Tū-te-tawhā killed the second and replied, "I have killed the next." In total, they killed four rangatira: Kuratau, Te Rae, Te Mori, and Te Tatao, and put the rest of the enemy to flight. The place was named Kuratau, after the first man to be killed there, while the battle was named Uwhi-uwhi-hiawai.

After this, there was peace, for a while, with Ngāti Whitikaupeka, and Tū-hereua returned to Whakatane, taking his sisters, Hinemihi, Hine-aro, and Te Aki-pare with him.

=== Death ===
Matangikaiawha, son of Umu-ariki of Ngāti Tūwharetoa and Kahu-pounamu of Ngāti Apa had a fortress on Lake Rotoaira, called Orangi-te-taea. He assaulted his wife, the daughter of Waikari, who then led a force to attack Orangi-te-taea. Tū-te-tawhā and Te Rapuhora came to the fortress and decided to go into the fortress and speak to Ngāti Apa directly.

Before they did so, they covered themselves in kōkōwai (red ochre), as part of a ritual called makama. Fletcher says that they did this since touching someone with kōkōwai was a method of cancelling out someone's tapu. John Te Herekiekie Grace says that it was intended to conceal their identities and that they intended to mark the Ngāti Apa men with it, so that Wakari would know who to kill when they conquered the fortress.

When they had done this, Hinemihi and Te Rapuhoro's wife said "your kokowai has an evil smell; it is an omen of misfortune," but they replied "No; it is a sign of good luck." They went by canoe to Rangi-te-taea and were welcomed into the village, performing the hongi with all the men and women. However, the Ngāti Apa rangatira attacked them. They fought back with their taiaha, Moeiti and Moerahi, but Miromiro killed them both, cut off their heads, and threw them into the latrine or stuck them on posts beside the latrine.

After this, Ngāti Apa decided to flee, since their position was untenable, and Waikari recovered the heads of Tū-te-tawhā and Te Rapuhora. He conducted a special ritual to end the tapu created by their deaths, by erecting a shrine at the edge of the water called Waitapu a Waikari and lighting a fire in it. Tū-te-tawhā and Te Rapuhora's heads were interred in a cave at Whakarongo-tukituki.

== Family ==
Tū-te-tawhā married Hine-mihi and had three sons and one daughter:

- Te Rangi-ita, ancestor of the Ngāti Te Rangiita hapū
- Tuara-kino
- Parapara-hika
- Tūrū-makina, the ancestor of Ngāti Tūrū-makina, who married her cousin Tukino, grandson of Hinemihi's brother Tū-hereua and was the ancestor of Herea Te Heuheu Tukino I.

== Bibliography ==
- Locke, Samuel (1882). "Historical Traditions of Taupo and East Coast Tribes". Transactions and Proceedings of the Royal Society of New Zealand. 15: 433–459.
- Gudgeon, W. E. (1904). "The Toa Taua or Warrior". Journal of the Polynesian Society. 13: 238–264.
- Te Hata, Hoeta; Fletcher, H. J. (1916). "Ngati-Tuhare-toa occupation of Taupo-nui-a-tia". Journal of the Polynesian Society. 25: 104–116, 150–162.
- Te Hata, Hoeta; Fletcher, H. J. (1917). "Ngati-Tuhare-toa occupation of Taupo-nui-a-tia". Journal of the Polynesian Society. 26: 19–30, 69–99, 180–187.
- Te Hata, Hoeta; Fletcher, H. J. (1918). "Ngati-Tuhare-toa occupation of Taupo-nui-a-tia". Journal of the Polynesian Society. 27: 38–46.
- Grace, John Te Herekiekie (1959). Tuwharetoa: The history of the Maori people of the Taupo District. Auckland [N.Z.]: A.H. & A.W. Reed.
- Jones, Pei Te Hurinui; Biggs, Bruce (2004). Ngā iwi o Tainui : nga koorero tuku iho a nga tuupuna = The traditional history of the Tainui people. Auckland [N.Z.]: Auckland University Press. ISBN 1869403312.
- McCallum-Haire, Hermione; Te Nana, Rihi; Gallagher, Joanne (2021). "Hihiko O Mangarautawhiri: Power Sovereignty for a Prosperous Whānau and Hapū". Scope: Contemporary Research Topics (Kaupapa Kai Tahu) (6): 33–43. doi:10.34074/scop.2006011.
