= Hepi Te Heuheu Tūkino VII =

Ngati Tuwharetoa leader, trust board chairman

Sir Hepi Te Heuheu Tūkino VII KBE OStJ
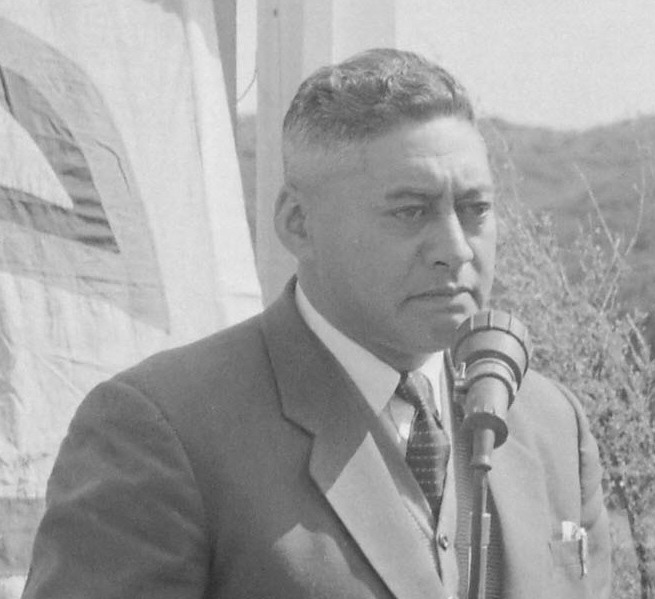
- Hepi Te Heuheu speaking in 1961

Chief of the Ngāti Tūwharetoa iwi
- In office April 27, 1944 – 31 July 1997
- Preceded by: Hoani Te Heuheu Tūkino VI
- Succeeded by: Tumu Te Heuheu Tūkino VIII

Personal details
- Born: Hepi Hoani Te Heuheu Tūkino VII; 26 January 1919 Wellington, New Zealand
- Died: 31 July 1997 (aged 78) Taupō Hospital, Taupō, New Zealand
- Spouse: Pauline Hinepoto (Tuutu) Te Moanapapaku
- Children: 6
- Parent(s): Hoani Te Heuheu Tūkino VI (father); Raukawa Tawhirau Maniapoto (mother)

Sir Hepi Hoani Te Heuheu Tūkino VII KBE OStJ (26 January 1919 – 31 July 1997) was the seventh elected chief of the Ngāti Tūwharetoa iwi, a Māori tribe of the central North Island, and an influential figure among Māori people throughout New Zealand.

== Biography ==
Hepi Te Heuheu Tūkino VII was born in Wellington, New Zealand, on 26 January 1919. He was the son of Hoani Te Heuheu Tūkino VI and his wife Raukawa Tawhirau Maniapoto, the daughter of Te Maniapoto and Wakahuia of Taupō.

After his father died on 27 April 1944, Hepi succeeded him as elected chief of Ngāti Tūwharetoa at the age of 25, in a ceremony conducted by the Māori King, Korokī. In his early years as chief, he concentrated on promoting the tribe's economic foundation through the development of farms and forests. He was influential in selling many lands early settlers required to developed, with strong opposition from traditionally non-selling families. Through his leadership, many families lost thousands of acres of ancestral lands, however it secured his goodwill with the Pakeha government. From 1956 until his death he was chair of the Tūwharetoa Trust Board. His leadership led to the tribe becoming one of the strongest and most independent Māori tribes. He was also a member of the board of the Tongariro National Park.

He was a key figure in forming the Federation of Maori Authorities in 1985–86 and was its first chair. He led representations to the government in 1985 which resulted in the principles of the Treaty of Waitangi being protected in the State Owned Enterprises Act 1986. He was instrumental in the formation of the National Maori Congress in 1990. He led the congress in a successful effort to retain and increase the number of Māori electorates, and in opposition to the Runanga Iwi Act 1990 which was repealed in 1991. Then in 1995 he played a leading role in opposing the government's proposal to set a capped budget ("fiscal envelope") for the settlement of historic Treaty of Waitangi claims.

Te Heuheu died at Taupō Hospital on 31 July 1997 aged 78 and was buried at Waihi. His eldest son Tumu succeeded him as paramount chief of Ngāti Tūwharetoa.

== Family ==
Hepi married Pauline Hinepoto (Tuutu) Te Moanapapaku, of Ngāti Tūwharetoa and Ngāti Maru descent on 27 January 1941. She died in August 1998. They had six children, including:

- Tumu Te Heuheu VIII (22 August 1941 – 23 September 2025), who succeeded his father as paramount chief of Ngāti Tūwharetoa
- Timoti ("Timi") Te Heuheu (24 January 1944 – 12 July 2012), a Ngāti Tūwharetoa leader, who often represented his brother. His wife Georgina te Heuheu was a National Party MP and cabinet minister from 1996 to 2011.

== Honours and awards ==
In 1953, Te Heuheu was awarded the Queen Elizabeth II Coronation Medal. In 1966, he was appointed as an Officer of the Order of St John. In the 1979 New Year Honours, he was appointed a Knight Commander of the Order of the British Empire, for services to the Māori people and community. In 1990, Te Heuheu was awarded the New Zealand 1990 Commemoration Medal.
