= Te Rohu =

Te Rohu (fl. 1820–1850) was a notable New Zealand tribal leader. Of Māori descent, she identified with the Ngāti Tūwharetoa iwi. She was active from about 1820. Active as the adviser of her father in peace and war, she became known for defeating an enemy army during the Musket wars.
