= Kura Te Whiria Ensor =

Māori fashion entrepreneur (1925–2015)

- Born: Kura Te Whiria Davis; 24 February 1925; Manunui, Manawatū-Whanganui, New Zealand
- Died: 18 January 2015 (aged 89); Thames, Waikato, New Zealand
- Burial place: Totara Memorial Park Cemetery
- Education: Thames High School
- Occupation: Fashion entrepreneur
- Organization(s): Māori Women’s Welfare League; New Zealand Modelling Association
- Children: 1

Kura Te Whiria Ensor (née Davis, 24 February 1925 – 18 January 2015) was a Māori fashion entrepreneur based in Auckland, New Zealand. She was associated with the 1970s renaissance in Māori-influenced design and is known for her dress "Tania."

== Biography ==
Ensor was born on 24 February 1925 at the small sawmilling settlement of Manunui, Manawatū-Whanganui, near Taumarunui, New Zealand. Her parents were Violet Moeroa Wilkinson and Robert Tiopira Davis. She was descended from rangatira Hiria Tiopira of Iwi Tapu on her paternal line. She had three younger brothers.

Ensor was educated at Thames High School and was taught sewing by her mother.

Ensor married pākehā butcher Donald Henry Ensor on 31 December 1946. They had one son together and the family moved to Auckland in 1951.

== Career ==
In Auckland, Ensor worked in the office of Coca Cola until 1952, then at a menswear manufacturer and supporting her husband's butchery business. She joined the Māori Women’s Welfare League's Auckland branch and fundraised for the organisation by hosting fashion parades.

Ensor began her fashion career designing clothes showcasing Māori motifs and patterns for her extended family. She engaged in some modelling work and was a member of the New Zealand Modelling Association. In 1969, Ensor established her own fashion label, Gay Forties Limited, which focused on producing garments for older, fuller-figured women. Ensor became associated with the 1970s renaissance in Māori-influenced design, alongside Sandy Ansett and Janice Hopper, and was a popular designer.

Ensor designed the wool evening dress "Tania," which featured a screen-printed panel with a kowhaiwhai motif in red, black and white, and was inspired by the shape of a Māori cloak. The dress was worn by Whetu Tirikātene-Sullivan, Minister of Tourism, during a promotional tour in Australia; was worn by Miss New Zealand, Pam King, at a Wool Board fundraising parade; and was showcased at the Sydney Opera House in 1974. It was also featured in the February 1975 issue of Vogue France.

== Death ==
Ensor died on 18 January 2015 at Thames, Waikato, New Zealand, aged 89. She was buried at Totara Memorial Park Cemetery.
