= Maniaiti Marae (Wallace Pā) =

Marae in New Zealand

- Wallace Pā
- Marae
- Location within New Zealand
- Coordinates: 38°53′32″S 175°23′02″E
- Location: Manunui, New Zealand
- Iwi: Ngāti Tuwharetoa (main); Ngāti Kahungunu (associated)
- Hapū: Ngāti Manunui

Maniaiti Marae or Wallace Pā is a marae in Manunui, 8 km south-east from the outskirts of Taumarunui, in the central North Island of New Zealand.

Members of the marae are mostly the descendants of Nehuora and Te Wakatahurangi Te Warahi (née Chadwick), the latter being better known as "Nanny Maraea". Nanny Maraea was a staunch and well-respected matriarch, and was responsible for much of the marae's development. Nehuora was also greatly respected and performed the duty of delivering the family's children. It is thought he may have delivered over a hundred children during his lifetime, possibly many more as it was not restricted to just his family.

The marae is also known as Wallace Pā, as "Warahi" was transliterated to "Wallace" during the time when Māori people were being encouraged to take European names. The Wharenui, meeting house was Nanny Marea's own family house. The house was moved from up above on her farm and placed as part of Maniaiti Marae. Maniaiti translates to small flats, Now though many descendants of Warahi, and Chadwick and many family or whānau have other names, including Chadwick, Roderick, and Te Wano.

== Tribal affiliation ==
The iwi (tribe) most affiliated with the marae is Ngāti Tuwharetoa, although Ngāti Kahungunu (the tribe of Nanny Maraea) are also closely associated. Most descendants associate with both iwi.

Through Ngāti Tuwharetoa, the whānau claim Ngāti Manunui as their hapū (subtribe), and Taupō-nui-a-Tia as their moana (lake). It is important in Māori culture to be able to show where lineage and rohe (area of origin) are located. An example is shown below of a common Ngāti Tuwharetoa pepeha (speech of introduction) or statement reflecting this:

Mihi	Translation
Ko Tongariro te Maunga Ko Taupō te Moana; Ko Tuwharetoa te Iwi; Ko Te Heuheu te Tangata	Tongariro is the Mountain Taupō is the Lake; Tuwharetoa is the Tribe; Te Heuheu is the Man*
*Te Heuheu, being the hereditary name of the paramount chief

== Environment ==
The region of Ngapuke is a rural forestry area. The Pungapunga River runs to the back of the marae and is used for swimming and catching eel in hinaki (net catchments).

== Future ==
In 2012, the marae received funding for a new wharepaku (bathroom and toilet block).

Some family members still live on the marae, but many live in other parts of New Zealand and Australia. Family members have been trying to raise funds to ensure the legacy of the Marae, and meeting notices are posted for gatherings to rebuild the Pā.

On 21 July 2012, the Wharepuni at Maniati was demolished by controlled burn, and will be replaced by new buildings.

A wharekai (dining hall) was moved and installed on the site in 2015.

In October 2020, the Government committed $1,560,379 from the Provincial Growth Fund to upgrade the marae and 7 other nearby marae, creating 156 jobs.
