= Thames High School =

Location
- 300 Sealey Street, Thames, New Zealand; 37°8′23″S 175°32′43″E

Information
- Type: State, Co-educational, Secondary
- Motto: Ut prosim patriae "That I may be worthy of my country"
- Established: 1880
- Ministry of Education Institution no.: 111
- Principal: Nil -vacancy
- Enrolment: 402
- Socio-economic decile: 5M
- Website: www.thameshigh.school.nz

Thames High School is a public high school in Thames, Waikato, New Zealand. Established in 1880, it is the second-oldest secondary school in the former Auckland Province.

== Academics ==
At all grade levels, Māori language courses are offered, with emphasis on developing confidence in speaking Māori and on an appreciation of Māori culture and values.

Thames seniors have access to Gateway, a student work program designed to educate students about real-life work.

Thames High School's Distance Learning programs include collaborations with the Correspondence School, the Open Polytechnic, Otago Polytechnic and Travel Careers and Training Ltd.

== Notable alumni ==
- Kura Te Whiria Ensor (1925–2015), Māori fashion entrepreneur

== See also ==
- Category:People educated at Thames High School
