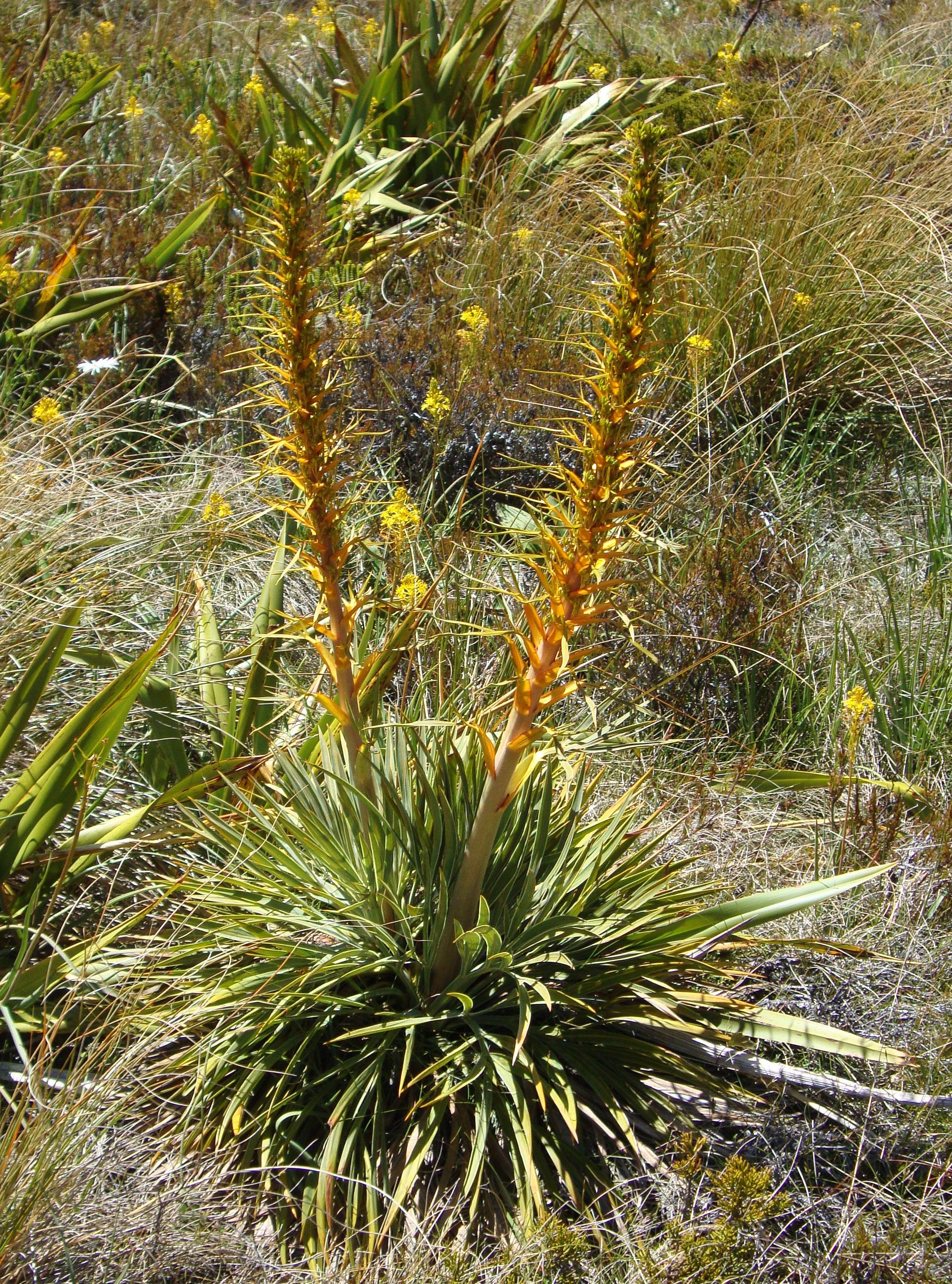
- Spaniard in flower

Scientific classification
- Kingdom: Plantae
- Clade: Tracheophytes
- Clade: Angiosperms
- Clade: Eudicots
- Clade: Asterids
- Order: Apiales
- Family: Apiaceae
- Genus: Aciphylla
- Species: A. colensoi

Binomial name
- Aciphylla colensoi Hook.f.

= Aciphylla colensoi =

Species of flowering plant

Aciphylla colensoi is a species of Aciphylla, commonly known as giant speargrass, Spaniard, or by its Māori-language name taramea. Individual plants may be up to 90 cm (35 in) in diameter and up to 1 metre (39 in) high when in flower, and consist of sharp spines, all pointing out from the centre. The leaflets are thick, and have rough margins and red-orange midribs. Yellow flowers may also be present, located on long, narrow, and strong stems. A. colensoi is endemic and can be found in both main islands of New Zealand, typically in altitudes from 900 to 1,500 m (3,000 to 4,900 ft).

== Taxonomy and naming ==
Joseph Hooker first described the plant in 1864. The specific epithet, colensoi, honours William Colenso.

== Distribution ==
It is found on both the North and South Islands of New Zealand from south of Mount Hikurangi through to the middle of Canterbury. It is found from 900 to 1,500 metres (3,000 to 4,900 ft) in subalpine to low alpine areas. They are often found in moist conditions on sites featuring a mix of snow tussock scrub, grassland, and herbfields.

== Conservation ==
The decline of A. colensoi due to browsing from rabbits was noted as early as 1883. Its conservation status as of 2023 is Not Threatened.

== Gallery ==
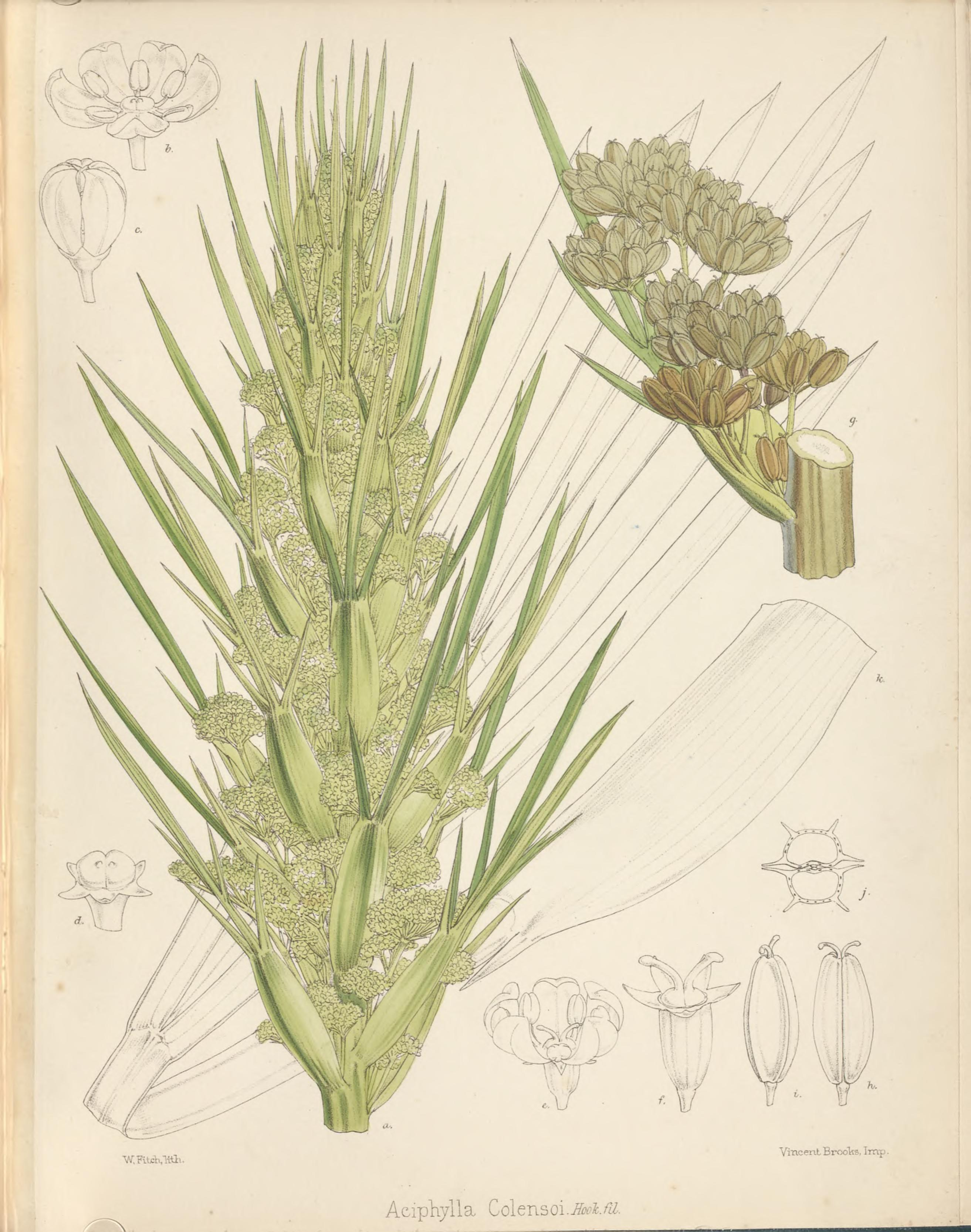
1868 botanical illustration

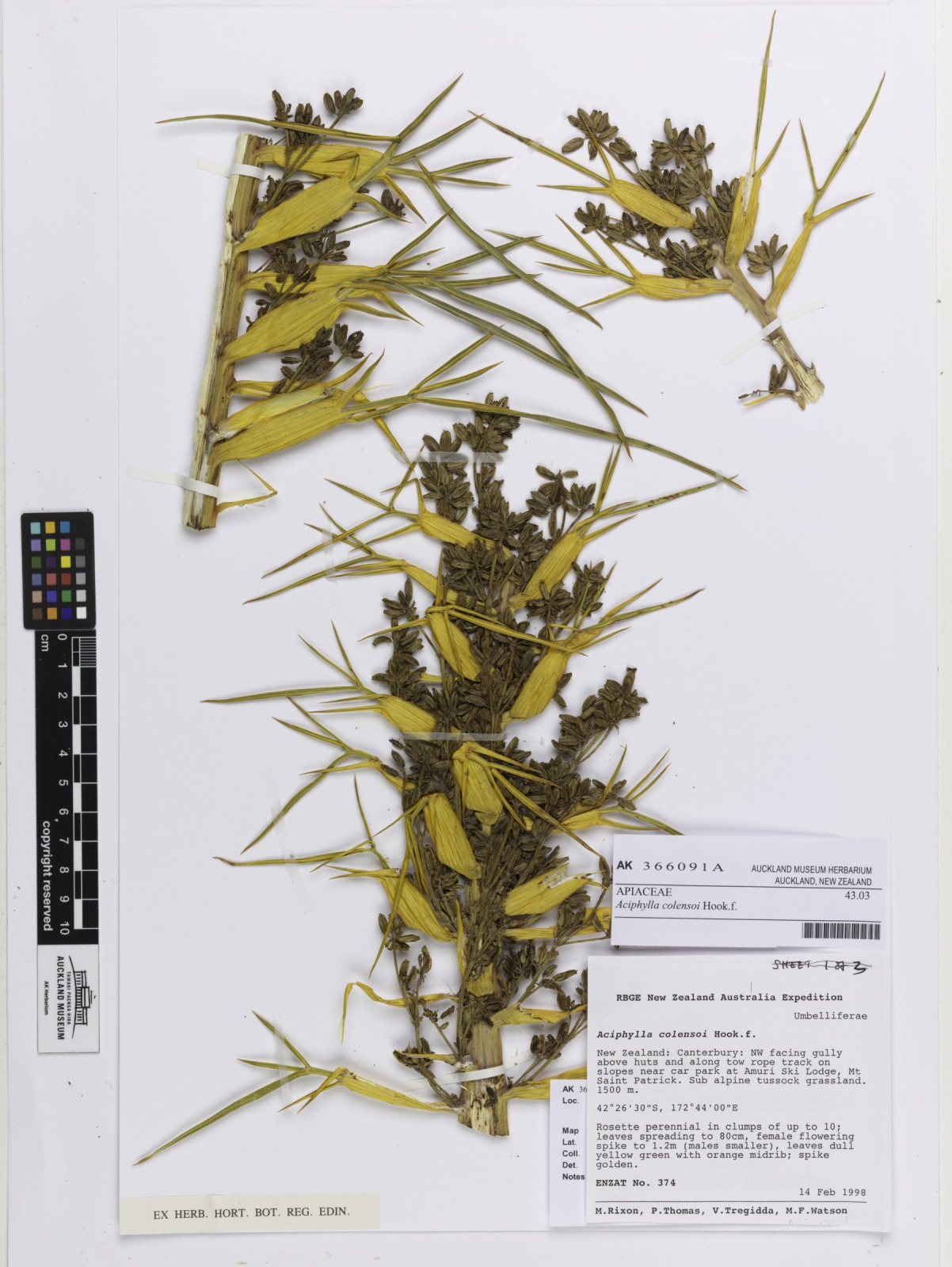
Herbarium specimen

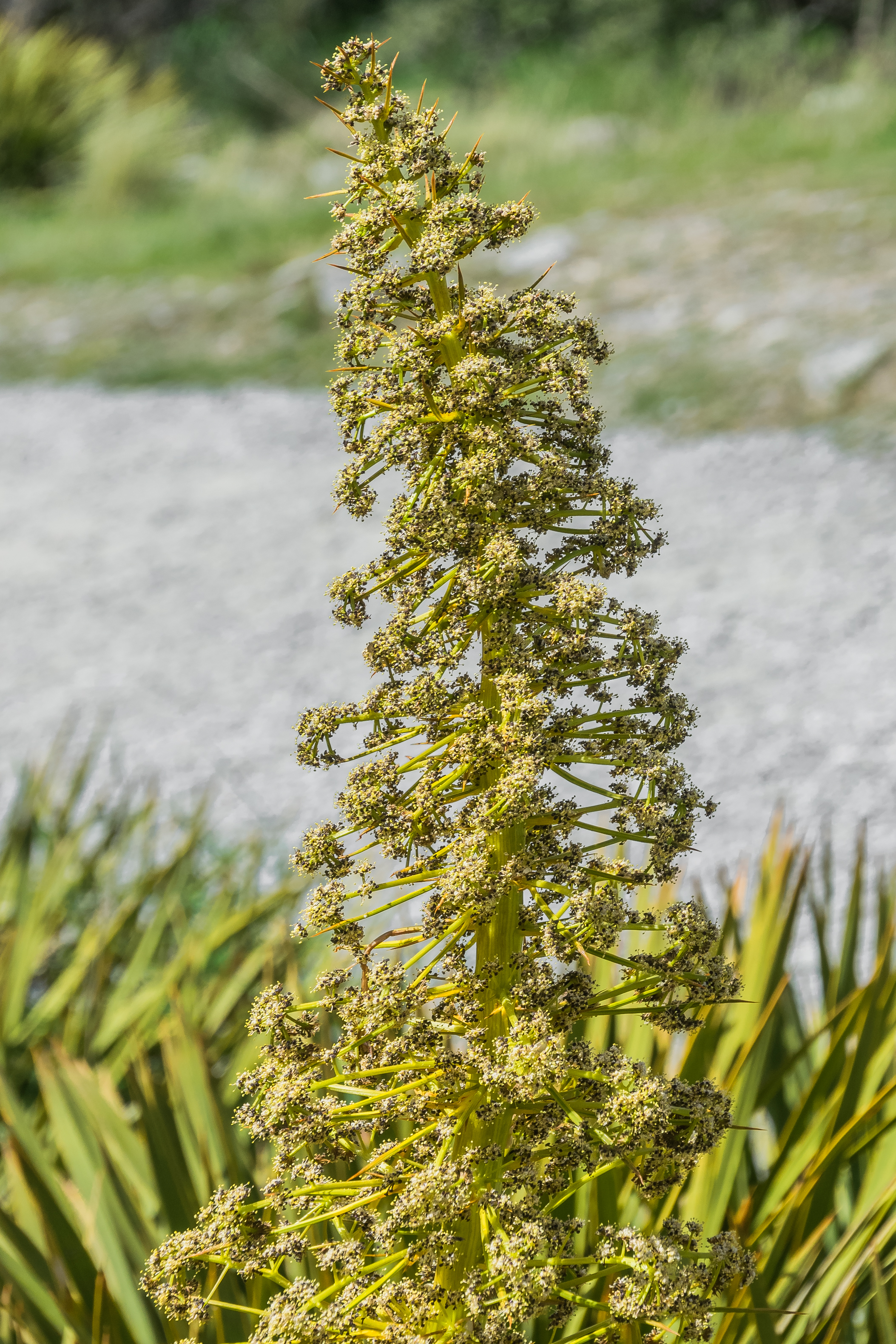
Inflorescence of a plant at Aoraki / Mount Cook National Park

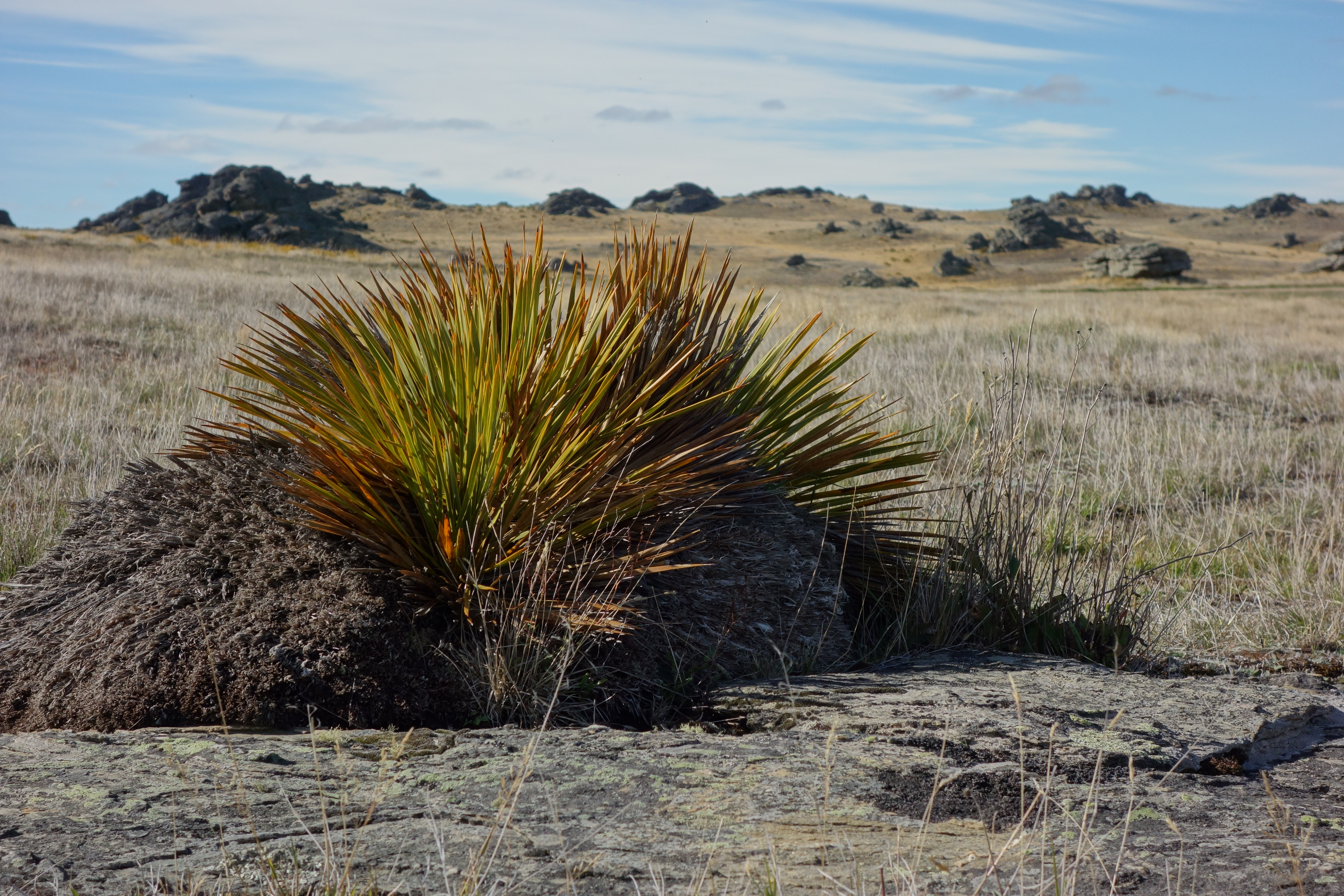
Aciphylla colensoi growing near Poolburn Reservoir
