= Te Heuheu Tūkino IV =

Māori chief in New Zealand (1821–1888)

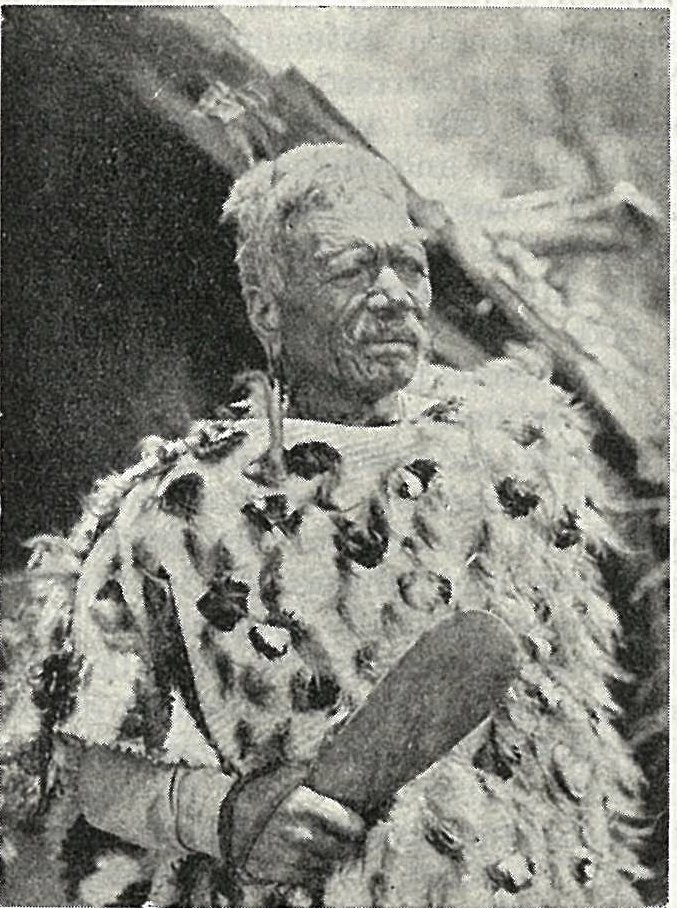
Portrait of Te Heuheu Tukino IV

Horonuku Te Heuheu Tukino IV (1821–1888), also known as Patātai (also spelt Patatai or Pataatai), was paramount chief of Ngāti Tūwharetoa, a Māori tribe of the central North Island of New Zealand. His birth name was Patātai; he assumed the name Horonuku – meaning landslide – after the death of his parents in a landslide in 1846. He was placed under house arrest by the Crown. He gifted the mountains of Ruapehu, Tongariro and Ngauruhoe in 1887 for the creation of Tongariro National Park.

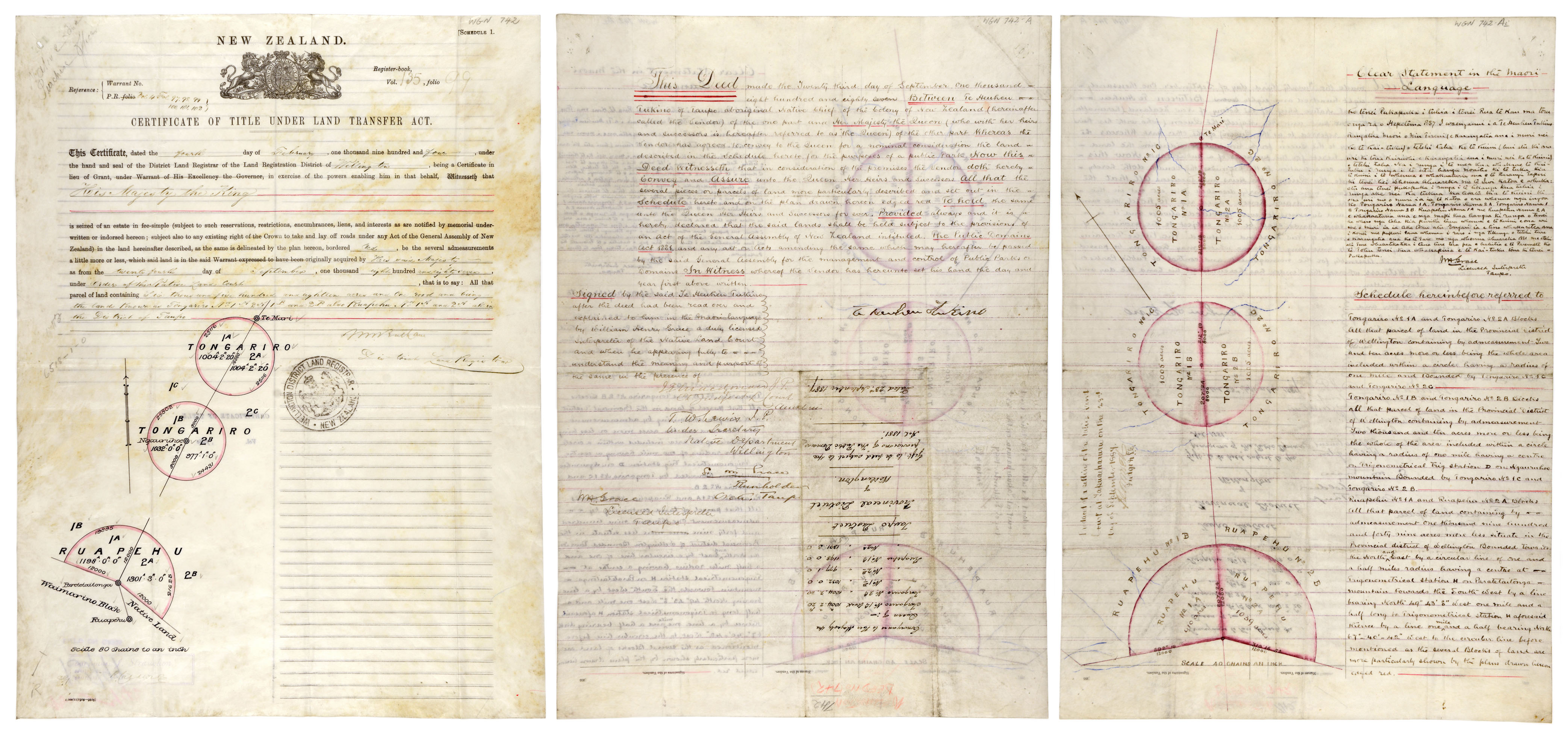
Tongariro deed of gift between Horonuku Te Heuheu Tūkino IV of Ngāti Tūwharetoa and the Crown (1887)

Horonuku's father Mananui Te Heuheu Tūkino II was a famous warrior who led the tribe successfully in many wars. Mananui allegedly stood well over two metres tall and was heavily built, and was not only a formidable warrior but also a fine military tactician. Horonuku succeeded him after his death in a landslide, but because he was at such a young age of 16, Mananui's brother, Iwikau Te Heuheu Tūkino III, was put in control of the iwi.

When Iwikau died in 1862 Horonuku succeeded his uncle as paramount chief. Although Horonuku was not renowned as a warrior he was an intelligent and far-sighted statesman who attempted to do the best for his people. In the 1860s Ngāti Tūwharetoa lands in the central North Island were leased to European settlers farming sheep, but a decade later the Tūwharetoa were worried that the mountains were to be surveyed and that Europeans would break traditional tapu. Horonuku, having discussed the subject with other chiefs of his tribe, put a proposition to the government – that the land be bequeathed to the nation as a national park, on the condition that the government should remove from the mountains the remains of their famous predecessors, including Mananui, and erect a suitable tomb. The government agreed and the deed was signed by John Ballance as Native Minister and Horonuku, in 1887.

He fought alongside Te Kooti against government forces at the Battle of Te Pōrere in October 1869. Defeated, he surrendered and was briefly exiled to Napier. He returned to the Taupō region in 1870.

Horonuku's sons included Tūreiti Te Heuheu Tūkino V, his successor as paramount chief of Ngāti Tūwharetoa.

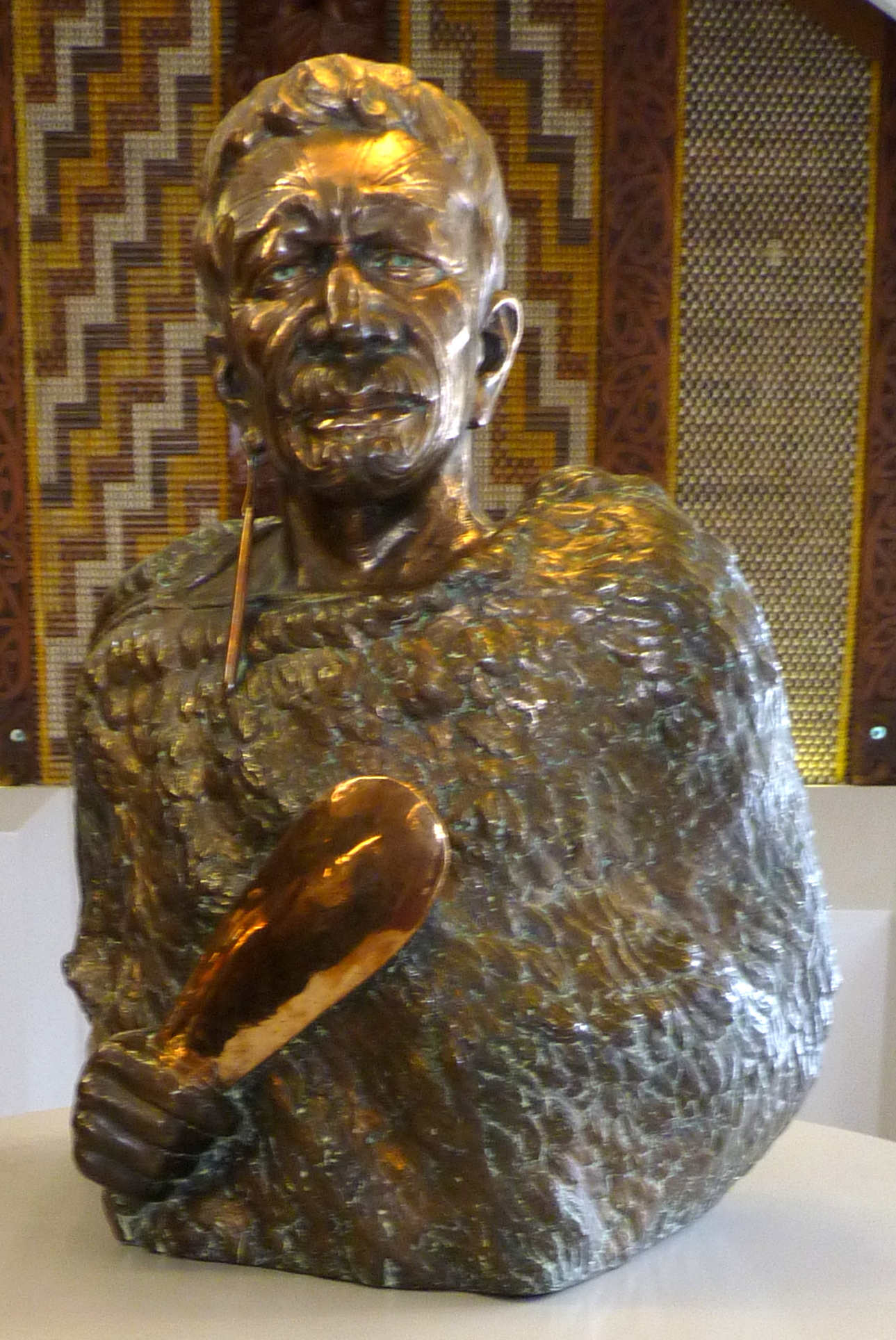
Bust of Te Heuheu Tūkino IV in Tongariro National Park Visitor Centre
