= Hoani Te Heuheu Tūkino VI =

Hoani Te Heuheu Tūkino VI (1897–1944) was a notable New Zealand tribal leader and trust board chairman. Of Māori descent, he identified with the Ngāti Tūwharetoa iwi. He was born in Waihi, New Zealand in 1897, the younger son of Tūreiti Te Heuheu Tūkino V.

In 1935, he was awarded the King George V Silver Jubilee Medal.
