= Tūreiti Te Heuheu Tūkino V =

Ngāti Tuwharetoa leader, politician

Tūreiti Te Heuheu Tūkino V (c. 1865 – 1 June 1921) was a notable New Zealand tribal leader and politician. Of Māori descent, he identified with the Ngāti Tūwharetoa iwi, and was the son of Te Heuheu Tūkino IV. He was born in Waihi, New Zealand in about 1865. He was appointed to the Legislative Council on 7 May 1918. He served until his death.

In 1900 he was living with his wife Te Rerehau Kahotea and their family in Lyall Bay.

He unsuccessfully contested the 1893 election in the Eastern Maori electorate against Wi Pere, and unsuccessfully stood in the Western Maori electorate in 1899, 1902, 1905, and 1908.
