= Tumu Te Heuheu Tūkino VIII =

New Zealand Māori tribal leader (1941–2025)

Sir Tumu Te Heuheu KNZM
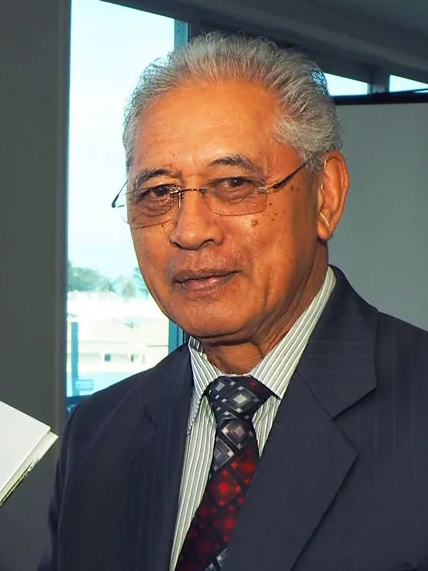
- Te Heuheu in 2015

Paramount chief of Ngāti Tūwharetoa
- In office 1997 – 23 September 2025
- Preceded by: Sir Hepi Hoani Te Heuheu Tūkino VII
- Succeeded by: Gerard Te Rangimaheu Te Heuheu Tukino IX

Personal details
- Born: Tumu Gerard Te Heuheu Tūkino; 22 August 1941 Little Waihi, New Zealand
- Died: 23 September 2025 (aged 84)
- Spouse(s): Susan, Lady Te Heuheu
- Parent: Sir Hepi Hoani Te Heuheu Tūkino VII (father)
- Education: St Patrick's College, Silverstream

Sir Tumu Gerard Te Heuheu Tūkino VIII KNZM (22 August 1941 – 23 September 2025) was a New Zealand Māori tribal leader. He was the eighth elected ariki and paramount chief of the Ngāti Tūwharetoa iwi in the central North Island, and an influential figure among Māori people throughout New Zealand.

== Early life and family ==
Te Heuheu was born at Little Waihi on 22 August 1941, the son of Hepi Te Heuheu Tūkino VII, the previous elected chief, and Pauline Te Heuheu. He was educated at St Patrick's College, Silverstream. He was a pilot and a former employee of Air New Zealand.

Te Heuheu was married to Susan, Lady Te Heuheu, and they lived in Taupō.

== Roles ==
Te Heuheu succeeded his father as ariki in 1997. He was the chair of the New Zealand Historic Places Trust's Māori Heritage Council from 2004 to 2014, a patron of the Tukia Group Board, was the chair of the UNESCO World Heritage Committee, the chairman of the Tūwharetoa Trust Board and chairman of the Lake Taupō and Lake Rotoaira Forest Trusts, and was a patron of the University of Auckland's Polynesian Society. He was a supporter of the Ahuwhenua Trophy for excellence in Māori farming and agriculture. Te Heuheu played a vital role in getting Tongariro National Park to have dual World Heritage status in 1993. As part of his final wishes, he called for the return of Tongariro National Park to the Māori.

== Death ==
Te Heuheu died on 23 September 2025, at the age of 84. His son Gerrard Te Rangimaheu Te Heuheu Tūkino IX succeeded him as ariki.

== Honours and awards ==
In 1990, Te Heuheu received the New Zealand 1990 Commemoration Medal. In the 2005 New Year Honours, he was appointed a Distinguished Companion of the New Zealand Order of Merit, for services to conservation. Following the restoration of titular honours by the New Zealand government in 2009, he accepted redesignation as a Knight Companion of the New Zealand Order of Merit.

In 2007, Te Heuheu was awarded an honorary DPhil degree by Massey University.
