= Iwikau Te Heuheu Tūkino III =

Iwikau Te Heuheu Tūkino III (died October 1862) was a 19th-century New Zealand Māori leader of the Ngāti Tūwharetoa tribe (iwi).
