= Ngāti Tūwharetoa =

Māori iwi (tribe) in Aotearoa New Zealand

- Iwi (tribe) in Māoridom
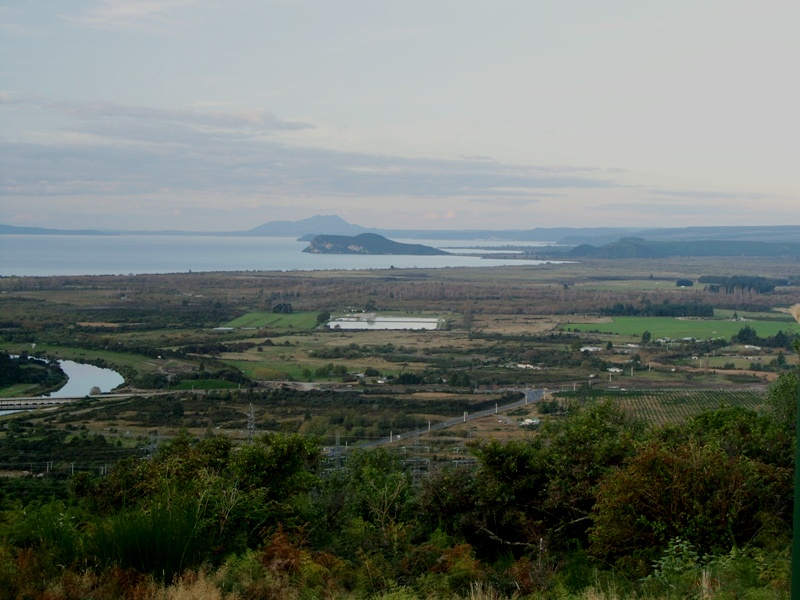
- Eastern Lake Taupō, Tūrangi to Taupō

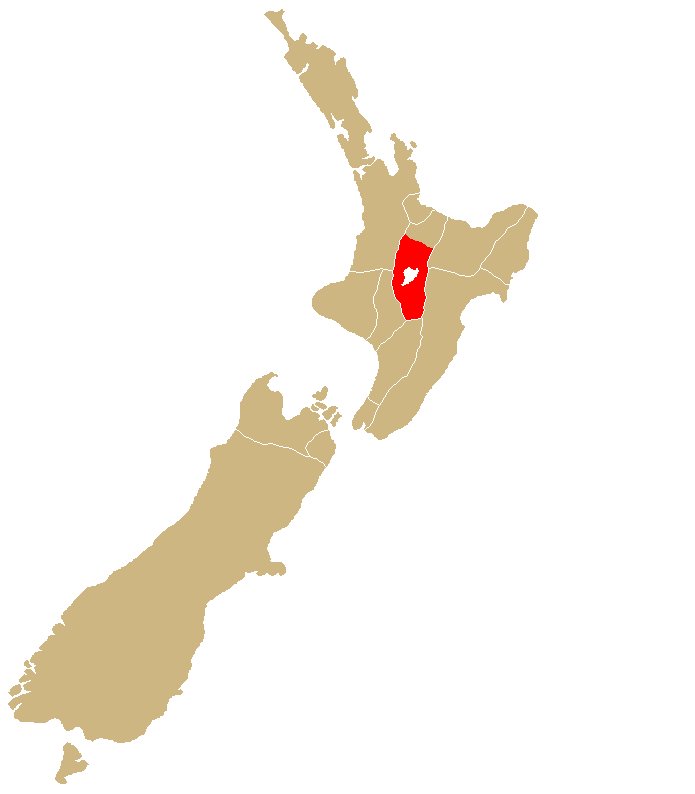
- Rohe (region): Central North Island
- Waka (canoe): Arawa
- Population: 47,103
- Website: www.tuwharetoa.iwi.nz

Ngāti Tūwharetoa is an iwi descended from Ngātoro-i-rangi, the priest who navigated the Arawa canoe to New Zealand. The Tūwharetoa region extends from Te Awa o te Atua (Tarawera River) at Matatā across the central plateau of the North Island to the lands around Mount Tongariro and Lake Taupō. The tribe consists of a number of hapū (subtribes) represented by 33 marae (meeting places). The collective is bound together by the legacy of Ngātoro-i-rangi as epitomised in the ariki (paramount chief), currently Te Rangimaheu Te Heuheu Tūkino IX.

Ngāti Tūwharetoa is the sixth largest iwi in New Zealand. It had a population of 35,877 in the 2013 New Zealand census, with 40% of its people under the age of 15. By the 2018 New Zealand census, there were at least 47,103 people identifying with the iwi, including 44,448 identifying with the Taupō branch, and 2,655 identifying with the Kawerau branch.

== History ==
=== Early history ===
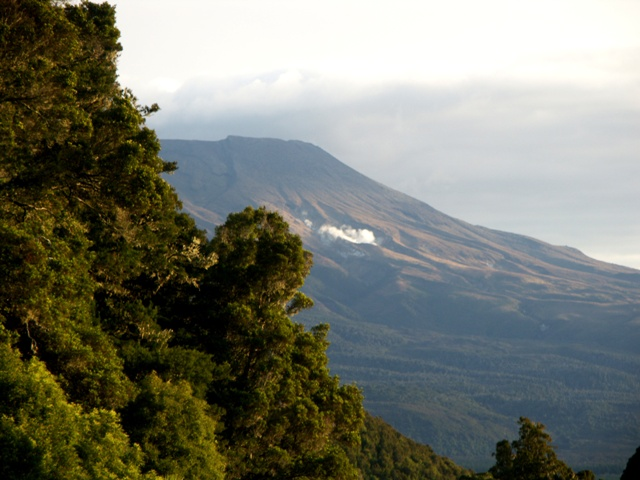
Ketetahi Springs

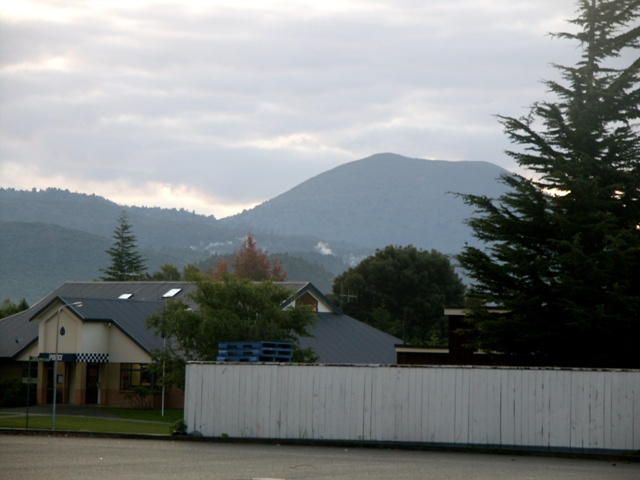
Western Taupō Steam and Hot Springs

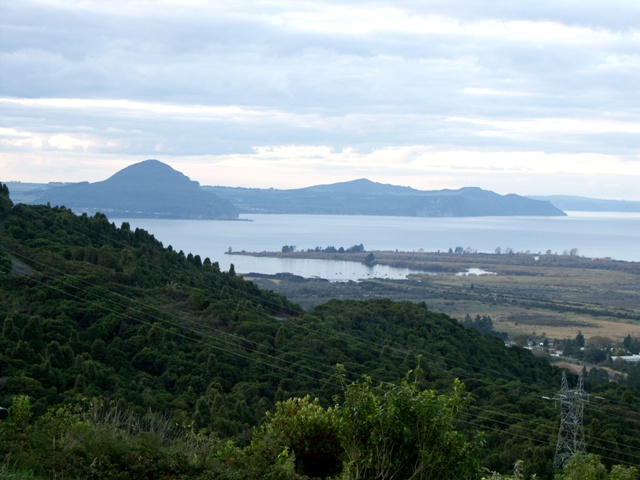
Western Taupō looking north

Ngāti Tūwharetoa are descendants of the eponymous male warrior Tūwharetoa i te Aupōuri. The main tribal areas of his people are based from Te Awa o te Atua in Matatā to Tongariro. He gains his mana principally from the powerful tohunga and navigator Ngātoro-i-rangi who piloted the great waka Te Arawa from Hawaiki to Aotearoa and also the great navigator Toroa of the Mātaatua waka. Ngātoro-i-rangi was tricked onto the Te Arawa waka by the chief Tama-te-kapua as it was considered good luck to have him aboard. He was originally destined to travel aboard the Tainui waka. This greatly angered Ngātoro-i-rangi and his disdain and animosity of the Te Arawa chief led to his leaving the group soon after arrival.

In Aotearoa they made landfall at Te Awa o Te Atua, and Ngātoro-i-rangi departed heading inland to Te Takanga i o Apa (Kawerau area), thence to Ruawahia there he encountered the monstrous Tama o Hoi and eventually reaching Taupō district where he climbed Mount Tauhara. From Tauhara, Ngātoro-i-rangi made his way to Tongariro with the intention of standing on its summit and thus claiming the district as his own. While climbing the mountain a powerful southerly wind whipped his face, icy gales chiselled the warmth from his body while the frozen volcano cut painfully into his feet eventually bringing him to his knees with cold. As Ngātoro-i-rangi lay dying he called to his sisters Kuiwai and Haungaroa in Hawaiki, to send fire to warm him, "Kuiwai e! Haungaroa e! Ka riro au i te tonga! Tukuna mai he ahi!" (Oh Kuiwai! Oh Haungaroa! I am seized by the cold south wind! Send fire to me!)

Heeding his call, they sent fire in the form of two taniwha, Te Pupu and Te Hoata. As they travelled underground the flames first erupted at Whakaari, then Rotorua and Taupō, finally bursting at the feet of Ngātoro-i-rangi, welling up from the large vent in the volcano’s summit, warming the tohunga and thus allowing him to achieve his goal. On the summit of Tongariro Ngātoro-i-rangi gave thanks and established 'Te Wharetoa o Tūmatauenga' The Warrior House of Tū – the legacy of Tūwharetoa.

Ngātoro-i-rangi did not remain at Tongariro, instead returning to the coast to live out his life at Mōtītī Island. His descendants settled at Te Awa o Te Atua inland to Kawerau increasing over the generations until the time of Mawake Taupō, 8th generation descendant of Ngātoro-i-rangi. Mawake Taupō married an ariki of Hapuoneone named Hahuru, whose lineage included the original inhabitants of the area and their son Manaia would eventually take the name Tūwharetoa.

The sons of Tūwharetoa moved from Kawerau across Waiariki and eventually into the district around Taupō and by skill at arms, strategy and might eventually established the rohe of Tūwharetoa settling in three divisions at Kawerau, Waiariki and Tongariro. Mai Te Awa o Te Atua Ki Tongariro, Tūwharetoa Ki Kawerau, Tūwharetoa Ki Waiariki, Tūwharetoa Ki te Tonga (From Te Awa-o-te-Atua to Tongariro, Tūwharetoa at Kawerau, Tūwharetoa at Waiariki, Tūwharetoa at Tongariro). This pepeha (tribal saying) describes the tribal boundaries of Ngāti Tūwharetoa extending from Te Awa o Te Atua (a confluence of rivers at Matatā) south to Tongariro.

=== Modern history ===
Ngāti Tūwharetoa were very active during the early 19th century through military and diplomatic actions amongst the surrounding iwi. From about 1822 to 1832 they fought battles against Ngati Maru. Although the location of Tūwharetoa in the Central North Island kept them isolated from European contact until 1833, the iwi was nonetheless very aware of Pākehā impact on the coast both through the introduction of new crops and stock (horses) and due to upheavals and conflicts amongst neighboring iwi to the north caused by the introduction of muskets. Te Rauparaha sought shelter with Tūwharetoa during his early rise to prominence and the Tūwharetoa war party met with Hongi Hika during the 1820s as part of the Roto-a-tara campaign at Heretaunga. Most notably Tūwharetoa actions during this period consolidated its position as the dominant iwi of the central plateau and the mana (authority) of Te Heuheu Mananui as paramount ariki.

In 1840 Iwikau Te Heuheu and others were in the upper North Island trading flax and later attended the meeting at Waitangi. However he did not have the authority to sign as that right was held by his older brother Mananui as ariki. Later during the Flagstaff War Mananui attempted to support Hōne Heke, but was dissuaded from doing so by Waikato. Iwikau Te Heuheu replaced his brother in 1846 and was a key supporter of the founding of the Kingitanga movement after hearing of growing abuses and land theft by the British Colonials.

Tūwharetoa did not take part in any of the early 1863 raids and battles in Auckland. Their first effort to join the Kingitanga movement was the Battle of Ōrākau. A few Ngāti Tūwharetoa men, women and children fought the Colonials with their fellow soldiers inside the Ōrākau fortifications. The bulk of Horonuku Te Heuheu's Tūwharetoa warriors were prevented from entering the rebel stronghold by the early arrival of government troops, who quickly formed a ring around the stronghold to prevent reinforcement. Tūwharetoa warriors were left to watch from a hillside 900 metres away where they were intermittently bombarded by Armstrong cannons. They could only encourage the defenders with haka from a safe distance.

Later in 1869, Tūwharetoa joined with the Māori sovereignty warrior Te Kooti and his Hau Hau supporters. Te Kooti had challenged the Māori King Tāwhiao at Te Kūiti for his position but been rebuffed. However the Kingitanga kept a close eye on Te Kooti as he fought with the government and settlers and loyal Māori. Tūwharetoa joined with Te Kooti's Hau Hau at Te Pōrere Redoubt, which was styled after a European fort. The result of the Battle of Te Pōrere was a decisive defeat for Tūwharetoa and Te Kooti. Women taken prisoner at Te Pōrere by the government soldiers indicated that Tūwharetoa were reluctant to fight. Te Kooti had kept the Tūwharetoa women under Hau Hau guard to ensure the Tūwharetoa men would fight. Donald McLean the native minister realised that confiscating significant Tūwharetoa land could cause further anti-colonial dissent. Instead, Tūwharetoa were forced to give some land – Mount Tongariro – to the crown.

== Mana ==
Ngāti Tūwharetoa academic Hemopereki Simon wrote that the mana, in particular the mana whenua and mana motuhake, of Ngāti Tūwharetoa is derived from the arrival of Ngātoro-i-rangi and that this is best demonstrated culturally through Puhiwahine's mōteatea, "He waiata aroha mo Te Toko", more commonly known as "Ka Eke ki Wairaka."

The following lines from this moteatea relate to the history of Ngātoro-i-rangi.

Kāti au ka hoki ki taku whenua tupu

Ki te wai koropupū i heria mai nei

I Hawaiki rā anō e Ngātoroirangi

E ōna tuāhine Te Hoata, Te Pupū

E hū rā i Tongariro, ka mahana i taku kiri.

== Chiefs ==
The following Ngā Ariki o Te Whare Ariki o te Heuheu (paramount chiefs) have held the position of Ariki of Ngāti Tūwharetoa.

The ariki are listed here in chronological order:

- Herea Te Heuheu Tūkino I – Elected to position. Hereditary title belonged to Wairere and Toteka of the Rongomai-Te-Ngagana
- Mananui Te Heuheu Tūkino II, (famous warrior/military tactician)
- Iwikau Te Heuheu Tūkino III, (famous statesman)
- Horonuku Pataatai te Heuheu Tūkino IV, (bequeathed Tongariro National Park to the nation)
- Tūreiti Te Heuheu Tūkino V
- Hoani Te Heuheu Tūkino VI, (Kakahi-Pūkawa Railway Line)
- Hepi Te Heuheu Tūkino VII KBE, (Lake Taupō negotiations)
- Tumu Te Heuheu Tūkino VIII KNZM, (Appointed in 2006 World Heritage Chairperson)
- Te Rangimaheu Te Heuheu Tūkino IX

== Media ==
Tuwharetoa FM is the official radio station of Ngāti Tūwharetoa. It began at Waiariki Polytechnic in Tūrangi in February 1991, was taken off air in late 1992, relaunched in 1993, and added a frequency reaching as far as Taumarunui. An off-shot station, Tahi FM, began in February 1993 but is no longer operating. Tuwharetoa FM broadcasts on 97.6 FM in Tūrangi, and 95.1 FM in the areas of Taumarunui, National Park, Whakapapa and Raetihi.

== See also ==
- Te Heuheu (disambiguation)
- Te Rohu
- Maniaiti Marae
