= Tauranga Taupō =

Settlement in Waikato, New Zealand

- Rural settlement
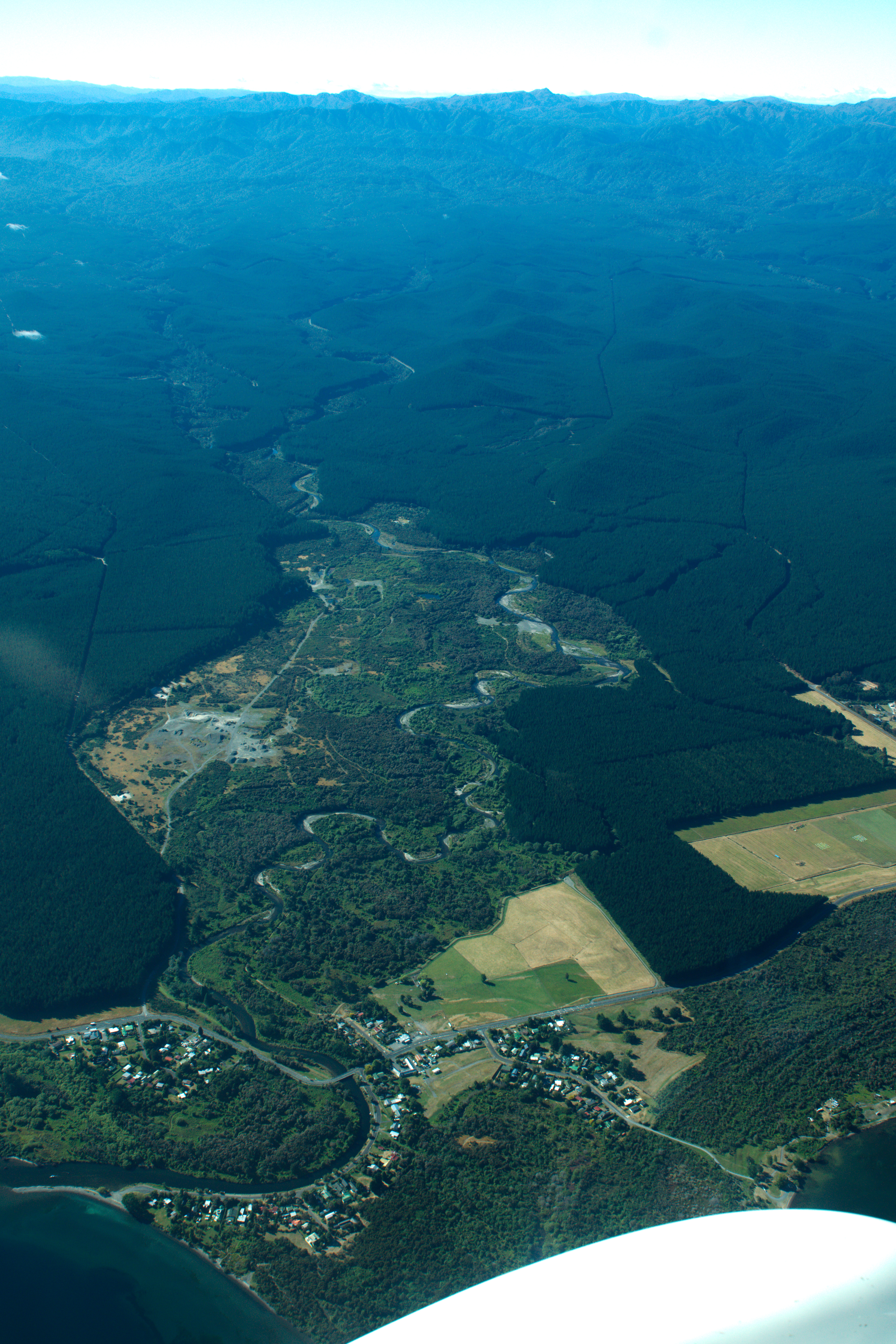
- Tauranga Taupō River and settlement
- Interactive map of Tauranga Taupō
- Coordinates: 38.910881°S 175.903644°E
- Country: New Zealand
- Region: Waikato region
- District: Taupō District
- Ward: Turangi-Tongariro Ward
- Community: Turangi-Tongariro Community
- Electorates: Taupō; Waiariki (Māori)

Government
  - Territorial Authority: Taupō District Council
  - Regional council: Waikato Regional Council
  - Mayor of Taupō: John Funnell
  - Taupō MP: Louise Upston
  - Waiariki MP: Rawiri Waititi

Area
  - Total: 2.75 km^{2} (1.06 sq mi)

Population (June 2025)
  - Total: 190
  - Density: 69/km^{2} (180/sq mi)

Tauranga Taupō is a semi-rural area located at the mouth of Tauranga Taupō River, on the southern shores of Lake Taupō in New Zealand's North Island.

== Settlements ==
The area includes three contiguous settlements: Oruatua, near the mouth of the Tauranga Taupō River. Te Rangiita or Rangiita, and Waitetoko or Waitetoko Beach. These settlements are located southwest to northeast on State Highway 1.

The closest towns are Tūrangi which is 13 km south of Te Rangiita and Taupō, which is 37 km northwest.

== History ==
The shores of Lake Taupō were first inhabited by Ngāti Hotu during the fourteenth century. Māori legends speak about explorers Tia and Ngātoro-i-rangi, who competed to claim land along the shores of Lake Taupō and passed through Tauranga Taupō. The children of Ngātoro-i-rangi's descendant Tūwharetoa came to the Taupō District and created the iwi Ngāti Tūwharetoa. A descendant of Tūwharetoa named Te Rangi-ita and his son Tama-mutu became important figures in the iwi around the seventeenth century. They were warrior chiefs who established territories in the Taupō District and established the Ngāti Te Rangi-ita hapū in the Tauranga Taupō area.

=== Colonisation ===
Europeans began arriving to the Taupō area in the early nineteenth century. The first road along the south eastern side of the lake was built in 1883. 1924 saw the construction of the Tauranga-Taupō bridge completing the road from Taupō to Tokaanu. This would later become State Highway One.

== Māori Sites ==
The local Waitetoko Marae is a marae for the local Ngāti Tūwharetoa hapū of Ngāti Te Rangiita. It includes Te Kapua Whakapipi meeting house.

== Demographics ==
Statistics New Zealand describes Oruatua-Te Rangiita-Waitetoko as a rural settlement, which covers 2.75 km^{2} (1.06 sq mi). It had an estimated population of 190 as of June 2025, with a population density of 69 people per km^{2}. The settlement is part of the larger Lake Taupō Bays statistical area.

Historical population
Year	Pop.	±% p.a.
2006	147	—
2013	147	+0.00%
2018	162	+1.96%
2023	186	+2.80%

Oruatua-Te Rangiita-Waitetoko had a population of 186 in the 2023 New Zealand census, an increase of 24 people (14.8%) since the 2018 census, and an increase of 39 people (26.5%) since the 2013 census. There were 102 males, 81 females, and 3 people of other genders in 90 dwellings. 4.8% of people identified as LGBTIQ+. The median age was 49.0 years (compared with 38.1 years nationally). There were 27 people (14.5%) aged under 15 years, 24 (12.9%) aged 15 to 29, 84 (45.2%) aged 30 to 64, and 48 (25.8%) aged 65 or older.

People could identify as more than one ethnicity. The results were 79.0% European (Pākehā); 27.4% Māori; 1.6% Pasifika; 1.6% Asian; 1.6% Middle Eastern, Latin American and African New Zealanders (MELAA); and 3.2% other, which includes people giving their ethnicity as "New Zealander". English was spoken by 98.4%, Māori by 8.1%, and other languages by 3.2%. No language could be spoken by 1.6% (e.g. too young to talk). The percentage of people born overseas was 8.1, compared with 28.8% nationally.

Religious affiliations were 27.4% Christian, 3.2% Māori religious beliefs, 3.2% New Age, 1.6% Jewish, and 1.6% other religions. People who answered that they had no religion were 58.1%, and 6.5% of people did not answer the census question.

Of those at least 15 years old, 24 (15.1%) people had a bachelor's or higher degree, 99 (62.3%) had a post-high school certificate or diploma, and 33 (20.8%) people exclusively held high school qualifications. The median income was $37,500, compared with $41,500 nationally. 12 people (7.5%) earned over $100,000 compared to 12.1% nationally. The employment status of those at least 15 was 63 (39.6%) full-time, 30 (18.9%) part-time, and 3 (1.9%) unemployed.
