= Kaingaroa Forest =

Forest plantation in New Zealand

Coordinates: 38°45′S 176°34′E

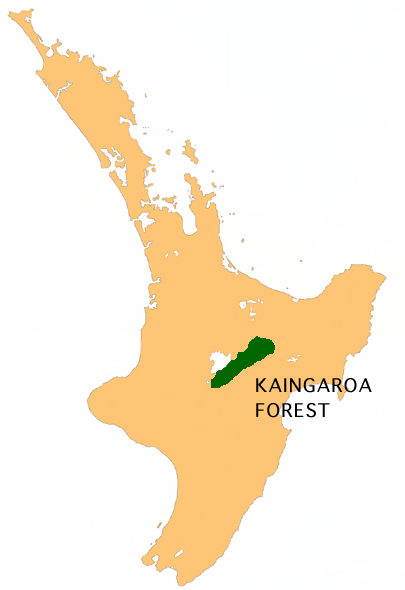
Location of the forest

Kaingaroa Forest covers 2,900 square kilometres (1,100 sq mi) of the Bay of Plenty Region of New Zealand, stretching from Lake Taupō in the south to Kawerau to the north. It has roughly 20 million trees. It is the largest forest plantation in New Zealand, and the second largest in the Southern Hemisphere (after the 6,000 square kilometres (2,300 sq mi) Sabie/Graskop plantation in South Africa). Prior to planting, the area was a tussock and scrub plateau (ranging between 500 and 2,481 ft (152 and 756 m) high), formed on volcanic ash. The headquarters of the forest are at the small settlement of Kaingaroa, 50 kilometres (31 mi) southeast of Rotorua. New Zealand State Highway 38 crosses the forest from Waiotapu to Murupara.

== History ==
Haungaroa was a legendary Māori woman who journeyed from Hawaiki to New Zealand with several women servants to see her brother Ngātoro-i-rangi. As they travelled inland across the Kaingaroa plains towards Lake Taupō they stopped to eat. Haungaroa took so long with her meal that the other women commented on it, and the area became named Te Kaingaroa-a-Haungaroa ("the long meal of Haungaroa"). In one account, the women left Haungaroa behind, and when she tried to rejoin them, they kept speeding up so she could not catch up. Haungaroa responded by using a karakia to turn them into ti (cabbage trees). In another account, Haungaroa hit two of the maids when they teased her about her slow eating and they ran away. She chased after them and turned them into two large tī trees, which remained until pine trees were planted there. It was said that when travellers were crossing the plains, no matter how much they approached the two trees, they seemed to remain the same distance away and could never be reached.

The forest was first planted in the late 1920s and owned as a state asset by the New Zealand government. Experimental planting of douglas fir and radiata pine began on a 5 acres (2.0 ha) block at Kaingaroa in 1901 and continued from 1906 using Waiotapu prison labour. By 1932 the pines averaged 128 ft (39 m) high and 2.1 ft (0.64 m) in diameter. Later planting was as an unemployment relief scheme. While under government control it was known as the Kaingaroa State Forest.

In the 1980s the government sought to sell the forests to private interests. Several Māori iwi went to Court to prevent the sale, arguing that they were the traditional owners of the land, that the land had been wrongfully taken from them, and that the government should retain the land until a settlement of Waitangi treaty claims had been reached. It took 20 years to settle the claims and to see the lands returned to the traditional owners. On 1 July 2009, it passed to a group of tribes who were the traditional land owners, in partial settlement of their claims that the Crown breached the Treaty of Waitangi. The forests themselves (the trees) continue to be owned by a private company (Kaingaroa Timberlands Ltd), which holds a forestry licence over the land.

== Climate ==
Climate data for Wairapukao Forest, elevation 437 m (1,434 ft), (1968–1987 normals, extremes 1951–1987)
Month	Jan	Feb	Mar	Apr	May	Jun	Jul	Aug	Sep	Oct	Nov	Dec	Year
Record high °C (°F)	32.8 (91.0)	32.1 (89.8)	29.3 (84.7)	26.1 (79.0)	21.1 (70.0)	21.6 (70.9)	16.5 (61.7)	18.4 (65.1)	23.0 (73.4)	27.7 (81.9)	27.6 (81.7)	30.0 (86.0)	32.8 (91.0)
Mean maximum °C (°F)	28.9 (84.0)	28.3 (82.9)	25.2 (77.4)	21.6 (70.9)	17.8 (64.0)	15.9 (60.6)	14.5 (58.1)	15.2 (59.4)	18.1 (64.6)	21.5 (70.7)	24.9 (76.8)	26.5 (79.7)	29.5 (85.1)
Mean daily maximum °C (°F)	23.1 (73.6)	22.9 (73.2)	20.8 (69.4)	17.4 (63.3)	13.9 (57.0)	11.4 (52.5)	10.9 (51.6)	12.0 (53.6)	14.0 (57.2)	16.4 (61.5)	19.1 (66.4)	21.1 (70.0)	16.9 (62.4)
Daily mean °C (°F)	16.5 (61.7)	16.2 (61.2)	14.6 (58.3)	11.2 (52.2)	7.8 (46.0)	5.8 (42.4)	5.2 (41.4)	6.4 (43.5)	8.2 (46.8)	10.4 (50.7)	12.9 (55.2)	14.9 (58.8)	10.8 (51.5)
Mean daily minimum °C (°F)	9.8 (49.6)	9.5 (49.1)	8.4 (47.1)	4.9 (40.8)	1.6 (34.9)	0.2 (32.4)	−0.6 (30.9)	0.8 (33.4)	2.4 (36.3)	4.3 (39.7)	6.6 (43.9)	8.7 (47.7)	4.7 (40.5)
Mean minimum °C (°F)	1.9 (35.4)	2.1 (35.8)	−0.3 (31.5)	−2.7 (27.1)	−5.0 (23.0)	−6.5 (20.3)	−7.0 (19.4)	−5.7 (21.7)	−4.5 (23.9)	−3.4 (25.9)	−1.3 (29.7)	0.9 (33.6)	−7.7 (18.1)
Record low °C (°F)	−1.0 (30.2)	−1.1 (30.0)	−3.6 (25.5)	−5.1 (22.8)	−6.4 (20.5)	−8.5 (16.7)	−13.0 (8.6)	−8.2 (17.2)	−7.7 (18.1)	−5.7 (21.7)	−4.0 (24.8)	−3.9 (25.0)	−13.0 (8.6)
Average rainfall mm (inches)	99.2 (3.91)	79.1 (3.11)	99.0 (3.90)	104.1 (4.10)	116.1 (4.57)	130.8 (5.15)	110.2 (4.34)	131.2 (5.17)	117.2 (4.61)	112.9 (4.44)	91.8 (3.61)	135.9 (5.35)	1,327.5 (52.26)
Source: NIWA

Climate data for Kaingaroa Village, elevation 544 m (1,785 ft), (1981–2010 normals, extremes 1951–1999)
Month	Jan	Feb	Mar	Apr	May	Jun	Jul	Aug	Sep	Oct	Nov	Dec	Year
Record high °C (°F)	31.7 (89.1)	30.7 (87.3)	29.0 (84.2)	26.2 (79.2)	23.7 (74.7)	18.3 (64.9)	17.8 (64.0)	17.8 (64.0)	23.4 (74.1)	26.7 (80.1)	28.0 (82.4)	29.4 (84.9)	31.7 (89.1)
Mean maximum °C (°F)	27.1 (80.8)	26.4 (79.5)	23.4 (74.1)	20.1 (68.2)	17.6 (63.7)	14.7 (58.5)	13.3 (55.9)	14.3 (57.7)	16.6 (61.9)	20.0 (68.0)	23.2 (73.8)	25.0 (77.0)	27.8 (82.0)
Mean daily maximum °C (°F)	21.6 (70.9)	21.6 (70.9)	19.6 (67.3)	16.5 (61.7)	13.3 (55.9)	10.9 (51.6)	10.3 (50.5)	11.2 (52.2)	13.5 (56.3)	15.5 (59.9)	18.0 (64.4)	20.1 (68.2)	16.0 (60.8)
Daily mean °C (°F)	16.1 (61.0)	16.3 (61.3)	14.1 (57.4)	11.1 (52.0)	8.4 (47.1)	6.4 (43.5)	5.7 (42.3)	6.5 (43.7)	8.4 (47.1)	10.4 (50.7)	12.4 (54.3)	14.8 (58.6)	10.9 (51.6)
Mean daily minimum °C (°F)	10.5 (50.9)	10.9 (51.6)	8.5 (47.3)	5.7 (42.3)	3.6 (38.5)	2.0 (35.6)	1.1 (34.0)	1.7 (35.1)	3.3 (37.9)	5.4 (41.7)	6.9 (44.4)	9.5 (49.1)	5.8 (42.4)
Mean minimum °C (°F)	3.3 (37.9)	3.9 (39.0)	−0.1 (31.8)	−2.1 (28.2)	−3.3 (26.1)	−4.6 (23.7)	−4.9 (23.2)	−4.7 (23.5)	−3.2 (26.2)	−0.8 (30.6)	0.6 (33.1)	2.8 (37.0)	−5.8 (21.6)
Record low °C (°F)	0.2 (32.4)	0.8 (33.4)	−6.0 (21.2)	−4.8 (23.4)	−7.0 (19.4)	−7.7 (18.1)	−9.4 (15.1)	−7.3 (18.9)	−5.6 (21.9)	−5.8 (21.6)	−1.9 (28.6)	−0.8 (30.6)	−9.4 (15.1)
Average rainfall mm (inches)	90.6 (3.57)	91.2 (3.59)	119.3 (4.70)	136.9 (5.39)	113.5 (4.47)	148.8 (5.86)	142.2 (5.60)	109.8 (4.32)	139.3 (5.48)	109.7 (4.32)	94.5 (3.72)	119.7 (4.71)	1,415.5 (55.73)
Source: NIWA (rain 1991–2020)

Climate data for Waimihia Forest, elevation 743 m (2,438 ft) (1961–1990 normals, extremes 1951–1989)
Month	Jan	Feb	Mar	Apr	May	Jun	Jul	Aug	Sep	Oct	Nov	Dec	Year
Record high °C (°F)	29.7 (85.5)	28.9 (84.0)	27.5 (81.5)	24.6 (76.3)	18.9 (66.0)	15.6 (60.1)	13.8 (56.8)	15.5 (59.9)	21.0 (69.8)	24.3 (75.7)	25.3 (77.5)	28.3 (82.9)	29.7 (85.5)
Mean maximum °C (°F)	25.5 (77.9)	25.1 (77.2)	22.3 (72.1)	18.9 (66.0)	15.2 (59.4)	13.1 (55.6)	11.8 (53.2)	12.7 (54.9)	15.0 (59.0)	18.7 (65.7)	21.5 (70.7)	23.4 (74.1)	26.3 (79.3)
Mean daily maximum °C (°F)	19.9 (67.8)	19.6 (67.3)	17.7 (63.9)	14.4 (57.9)	11.1 (52.0)	8.8 (47.8)	8.0 (46.4)	9.1 (48.4)	10.9 (51.6)	13.5 (56.3)	15.9 (60.6)	18.2 (64.8)	13.9 (57.1)
Daily mean °C (°F)	14.5 (58.1)	14.4 (57.9)	12.9 (55.2)	9.8 (49.6)	6.9 (44.4)	5.0 (41.0)	4.3 (39.7)	5.0 (41.0)	6.7 (44.1)	8.8 (47.8)	10.9 (51.6)	13.1 (55.6)	9.4 (48.8)
Mean daily minimum °C (°F)	9.2 (48.6)	9.2 (48.6)	8.0 (46.4)	5.2 (41.4)	2.7 (36.9)	1.1 (34.0)	0.5 (32.9)	1.0 (33.8)	2.5 (36.5)	4.1 (39.4)	5.9 (42.6)	8.0 (46.4)	4.8 (40.6)
Mean minimum °C (°F)	2.0 (35.6)	1.8 (35.2)	0.2 (32.4)	−1.5 (29.3)	−3.8 (25.2)	−5.2 (22.6)	−5.3 (22.5)	−4.8 (23.4)	−3.7 (25.3)	−2.6 (27.3)	−1.5 (29.3)	1.0 (33.8)	−6.2 (20.8)
Record low °C (°F)	−1.3 (29.7)	−2.1 (28.2)	−4.0 (24.8)	−6.7 (19.9)	−7.5 (18.5)	−8.0 (17.6)	−8.3 (17.1)	−8.4 (16.9)	−7.0 (19.4)	−5.0 (23.0)	−6.1 (21.0)	−3.3 (26.1)	−8.4 (16.9)
Average rainfall mm (inches)	123 (4.8)	113 (4.4)	127 (5.0)	111 (4.4)	139 (5.5)	157 (6.2)	160 (6.3)	156 (6.1)	155 (6.1)	143 (5.6)	124 (4.9)	156 (6.1)	1,664 (65.4)
Source: NIWA
