= Te Rangiita, New Zealand =

Small settlement in Tauranga Taupō, Taupō District, New Zealand

Te Rangiita is a small settlement in the Tauranga Taupō area of the Taupō District, New Zealand.

== Location ==
Te Rangiita is one of three settlements of Tauranga-Taupō. It is located on the south eastern shores of Lake Taupō and west of the Tauranga-Taupō River.

Oruatua and Waitetoko are the other two settlements that boarder either side of Te Rangiita. State Highway One connects the settlements to each other and with the rest of the North Island. Oruatua is located south and is near the mouth of the Tauranga Taupo River. Waitetoko is north and is known for its beachside location on Lake Taupo.

The closest towns are Tūrangi which is 13 km south of Te Rangiita and Taupō, which is 37 km northwest.

== History ==
The shores of Lake Taupō were first inhabited by Ngāti Hotu during the fourteenth century. Māori legends speak about explorers Tia and Ngātoro-i-rangi. Both competed to claim land along the shores of Lake Taupō. and would have passed through what would later be named Te Rangiita. The children of Ngātoro-i-rangi's descendant Tūwharetoa came to the Taupō District and created the iwi Ngāti Tūwharetoa. A descendant of Tūwharetoa named Te Rangi-ita and his son Tama-mutu became important figures in the iwi around the seventeenth century. They were warrior chiefs who established territories in the Taupō District and established the Ngāti Te Rangi-ita hapū in the Tauranga Taupō area.

Some descendants of Te Rangi-ita still bear his name as a surname and the hapū is still based in the Tauranga-Taupo area.

=== Colonisation ===
Europeans began arriving to the Taupō area in the early nineteenth century. The first road along the south eastern side of the lake was built in 1883. 1924 saw the construction of the Tauranga-Taupō bridge completing the road from Taupō to Tokaanu. This would later become State Highway One.

=== Modern day ===
The traditional names for the three settlements in Tauranga-Taupō became their formal place names in recent times. Te Rangiita remains a small settlement with less than 100 permanent residents. There is a petrol station, cafe and some accommodation along the main road. Its close proximity to the lake make it a popular destination for visitors especially during the summer.
