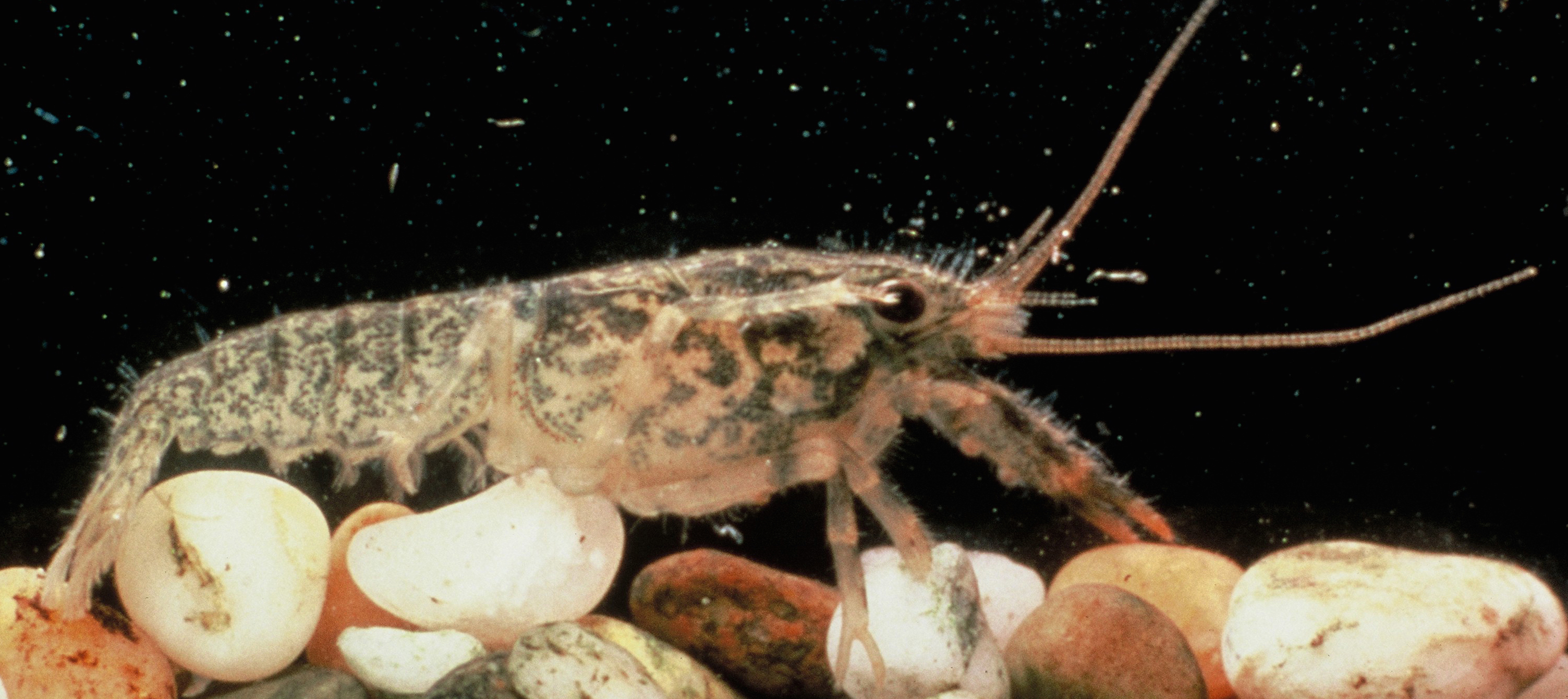

Conservation status
- Least Concern (IUCN 3.1)

- Not Threatened (NZ TCS)

Scientific classification
- Kingdom: Animalia
- Phylum: Arthropoda
- Clade: Pancrustacea
- Class: Malacostraca
- Order: Decapoda
- Suborder: Pleocyemata
- Family: Parastacidae
- Genus: Paranephrops
- Species: P. planifrons

Binomial name
- Paranephrops planifrons White, 1842
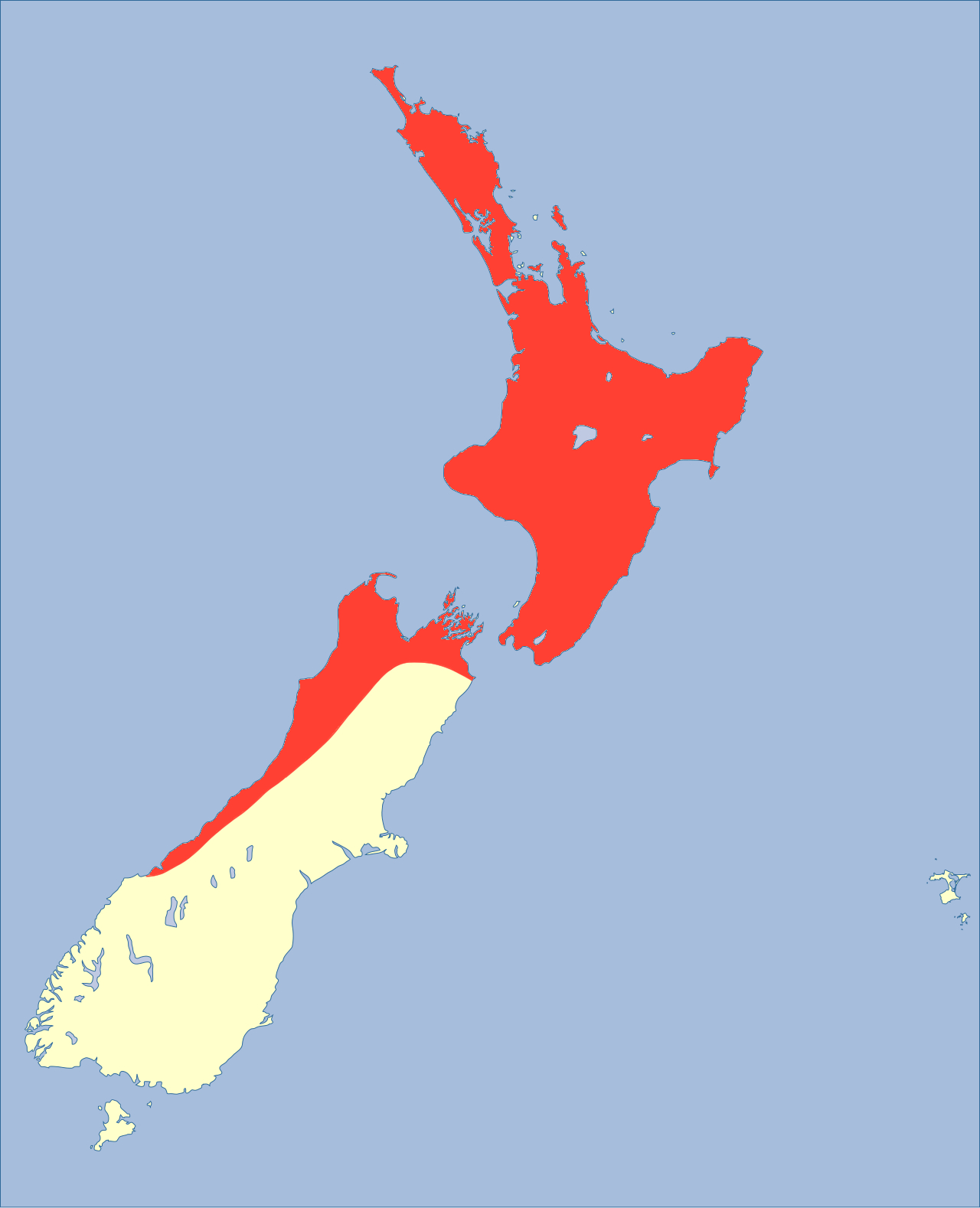

Synonyms
- Paranephrops tenuicornis Dana, 1852

= Paranephrops planifrons =

Species of crayfish

Paranephrops planifrons or northern kōura is a species of southern crayfish in the family Parastacidae. It is found in New Zealand. P. planifrons is one of two indigenous species of freshwater crayfish found in New Zealand. They are more commonly found in the North Island and the West Coast of the South Island while the P. zealandicus is found in the east and south of the South Island. Both species of Paranephrops are important resources to the indigenous Māori, particularly in the Te Arawa and Lake Taupō regions.

== Taxonomy ==
Paranephrops planifrons was first described in taxonomic literature in 1842 by Scottish zoologist Adam White from specimens collected from Waihou River (then called Thames River) in the North Island. The species has been redescribed numerous times, but was most recently revised in 1970. The holotype specimen is stored in the Natural History Museum of London.

== Etymology ==
Paranephrops planifrons is commonly known as the northern crayfish or northern kōura in English, though its more specific name is the North Island freshwater crayfish. In the indigenous Māori language, it has several names: karawai (a generic term), kēkēwai, kēwai koeke and kōura (also a generic term).

== Description ==
Paranephrops planifrons is smaller than the southern kōura, Paranephrops zealandicus, and has front claws that are less hairy.

== Conservation status ==
The International Union for Conservation of Nature's conservation status of P. planifrons is "least concern", with no immediate threat to the species' survival. Likewise, the New Zealand Threat Classification System lists the species as "Not Threatened".
