= Rongomai =

Māori mythology

In Māori mythology, Rongomai refers to several entities:

- a deity by whose assistance Haungaroa traveled from Hawaiki to New Zealand as she went to tell Ngātoro-i-rangi that he had been cursed by Manaia.
- a being in whale form which attacked and almost wiped out the war-party of Maru.
- a god of comet.
- the war god of the tribes in the Lake Taupō region.
- a celebrated demi-god ancestor of some iwi. He went with Ihinga and others of his friends to visit the dread Miru in her abode in the underworld. There they were taught incantations, witchcraft, religious songs, dances, and certain games. One of Rongomai's men was caught, and was claimed by Miru in sacrifice, as payment for having imparted the sacred knowledge, but Rongomai and the others got safely back to the world again.
- the chief of the Mahuhu canoe in its voyage from Hawaiki to New Zealand. He was drowned when the canoe overturned, and his body was eaten by the araara fish, since held sacred by the Ngā Puhi and Rarawa iwi, who claim descent from Rongomai. Until they embraced Christianity, those iwi would not eat the araara (or trevally, Caranx georianus) .
- a meteor or comet, seen in the full light of day when in comparatively recent times, the Ngāti Hau tribe were besieging the fortress named Rangiuru at Ōtaki, occupied by the Ngāti Awa.Ronngomai can mean princess or sunshine said in many Māori dictionaries and the big book of names.
