= Haungaroa =

Haungaroa was a legendary Māori woman who travelled from Hawaiki to New Zealand to warn her brother Ngātoro-i-rangi that Manaia was planning to attack him. She was responsible for the naming of Kaingaroa and other places in the central North Island, according to Te Arawa and Ngāti Tūwharetoa traditions.

== Life ==
Haungaroa was born in Hawaiki. Her brother Ngātoro-i-rangi was a powerful priest who travelled to New Zealand on the Arawa canoe and became a founding ancestor of Ngāti Tūwharetoa. Her sister Kuiwai was married to Manaia, an important chief in Hawaiki. Some time after the Arawa departed from Hawaiki for New Zealand, Manaia held a feast. The food prepared by Kuiwai was found to be under-cooked, and Manaia angrily cursed his wife and threatened to cook her brother Ngātoro-i-rangi as poorly as she had cooked the meal. Kuiwai invoked the gods Kahukura, Itupawa, and Rongomai and received approval to send warning to Ngātoro-i-rangi, who was now in New Zealand.

=== Journey to Taupō ===
Different traditions agree that Haungaroa undertook this voyage, but disagree about who she travelled with and how she travelled. Walter Gudgeon says that Haungaroa and Kuiwai travelled to New Zealand in the canoe Utupawa. John Grace reports the Tūwharetoa tradition that Haungaroa and Kuiwai travelled with a man called Tanewhakaraka and two maids in the canoe Rewarewa and made landfall at Tawhiuwhiu in Hawkes' Bay. They took with them two gods, Maru and Kahukura. Don Stafford reports the Arawa tradition, according to which Haungaroa travelled with Kuiwai's daughter and three maids. Stafford says that they were carried over the sea by the gods, until they reached Whakaari / White Island and came ashore at Tawhiuwhiu.

They travelled inland towards Lake Taupō, where Ngātoro-i-rangi had settled. When the party reached Waiwhakaari in the Taupō area, they found that Ngātoro-i-rangi had departed.

According to Grace, the god Horomatangi, who had been brought to New Zealand by Ngātoro-i-rangi, came from Whakaari / White Island to guide the travellers. He travelled underground to Lake Taupō and then burst up, spraying pumice all around, so that they travellers saw him. Diving back down he created a whirlpool. This act is said to have created the deep current in the lake east of Motutaiko Island, as well as a periodic whirlpool. He squirted out a jet of water pointing north to show them the direction that they needed to travel. This spray became the Karapiti blowhole. Horomatangi remained in the lake, where he is identified with a particular black rock, although he is also said to come ashore as a lizard called Ihumataotao.

=== Naming of Kaingaroa ===
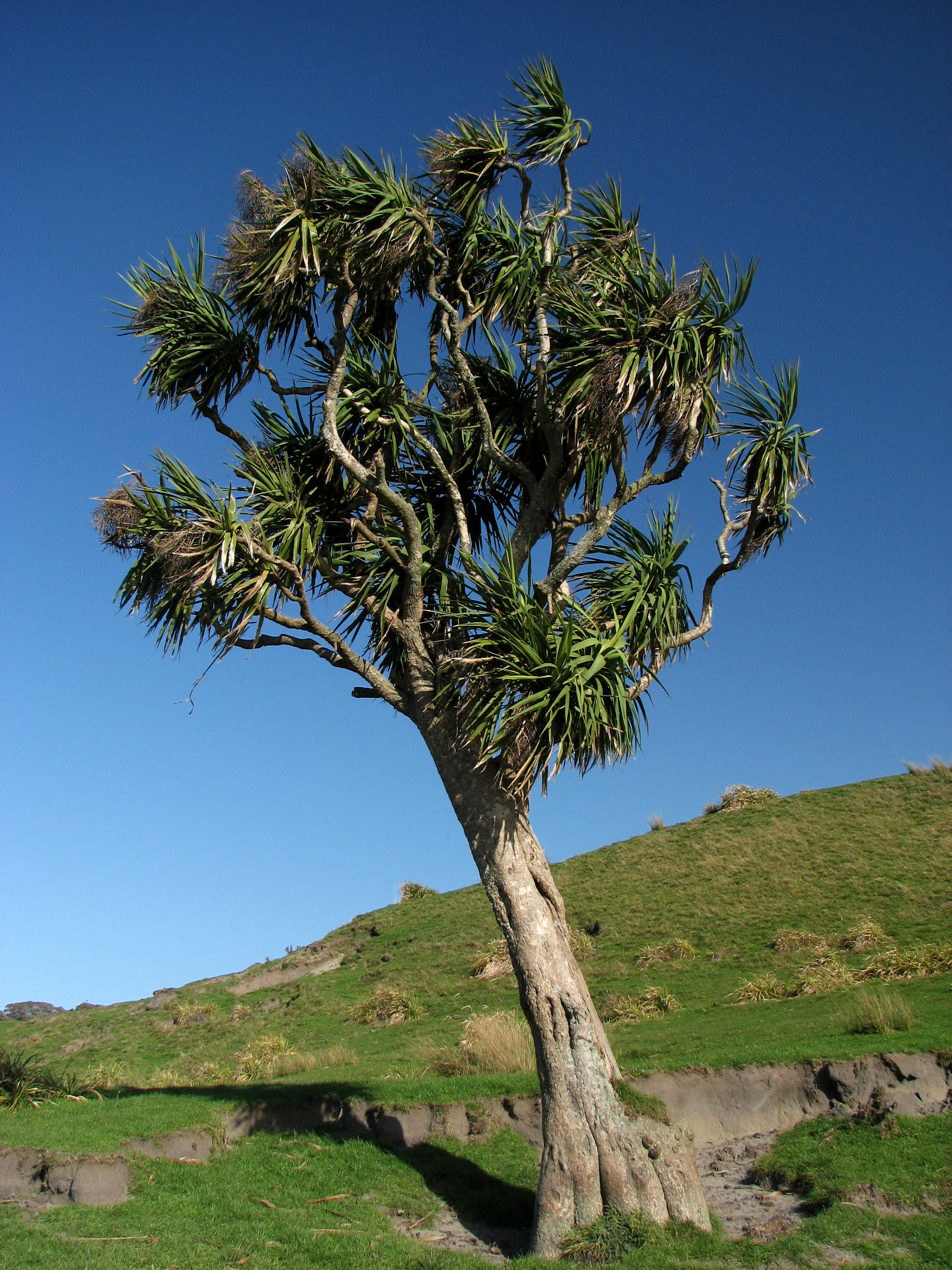
Ti tree

After travelling inland they stopped to eat and Haungaroa took so long with her meal that the other women commented on it. As a result the area was named Kaingaroa or Te Kaingaroa-a-Haungaroa ("the long meal of Haungaroa"). According to Grace, this happened before reaching Taupō; according to Stafford it happened afterwards. In Grace's account, the women left Haungaroa behind. When she tried to rejoin them, they kept speeding up so that she could not catch up and Haungaroa responded by using a karakia to turn them into ti trees. In Stafford's account, Haungaroa hit two of the maids when they complained about her slow eating and they fled into the forest. She chased after them and turned them into tī trees. These trees were pointed out by travellers and it was said that, when travellers approached them, they would move away and could never actually be reached. Later in the journey, Haungaroa cried because she missed the people of Hawaiki. The hilltop where this happened was named Te Tangihanga ("the weeping") as a result.

The travellers caught sight of Lake Rotorua from a high hill called Piopio, then travelled on towards it, stopping to sit and take in the view from the east end of Te Tihi-o-tonga. They also caused the beginning of geothermal activity at Whakarewarewa.

=== Arrival at Maketu ===
Finally, they found Ngātoro-i-rangi's house at Maketu. Instead of entering by the gate, they climbed over the fence and sat in the most sacred part of the compound. This was a violation of tapu and news of it was taken to Ngātoro-i-rangi, but he realised who they must be and welcomed them without complaint. They told Ngātoro-i-rangi the story and he launched an expedition back to Hawaiki to get revenge on Manaia.

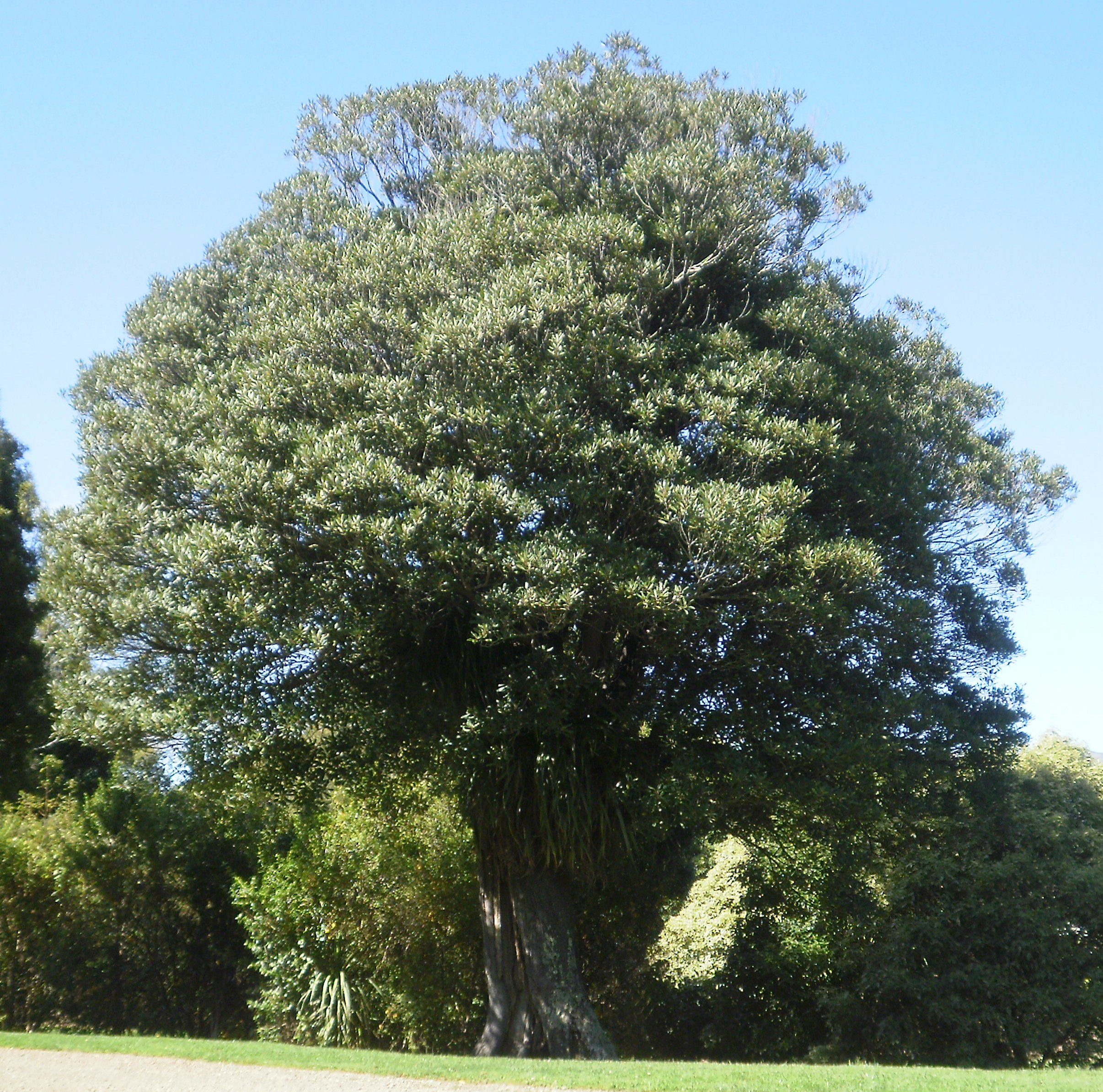
A hinau tree

Gudgeon reports that a hinau tree called Hunahuna-o-po on the Horomanga-o-po stream near Galatea, which was still visible in 1906, was said to have been brought from Hawaiki by Haungaroa and Kuiwai, but he concluded that the tradition was unreliable because the story did not record the reason why they had brought this tree.

== Bibliography ==
- Gudgeon, W. E. (1906). "The Tipua-kura and other manifestations of the spirit world". Journal of the Polynesian Society. 15: 27–57.
- Grace, John Te Herekiekie (1970) [1959]. Tuwharetoa: The history of the Maori people of the Taupo District. Auckland: A.H. & A.W. Reed. ISBN 9780589003739.
- Stafford, D. M. (1967). Te Arawa: A History of the Arawa People. Rotorua, New Zealand: A.H. & A.W. Reed.
