= Waitahanui River =

Coordinates: 38.828°S 176.097°E

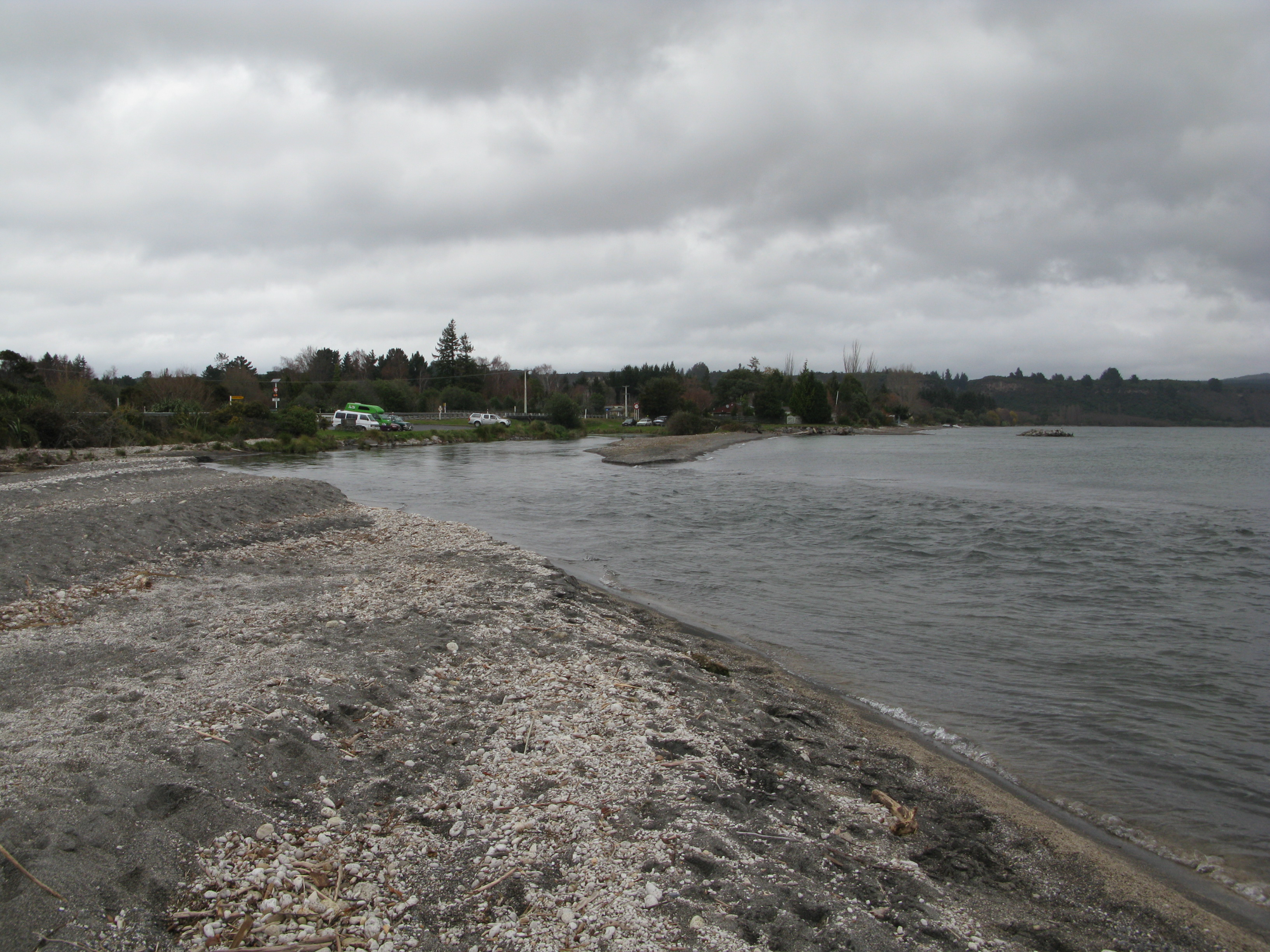
- Waitahanui River entering Lake Taupō

- Location of Waitahanui River in New Zealand

Physical characteristics
- Source: Kaimanawa Ranges
- Mouth: Lake Taupō
  - location: Waitahanui, New Zealand

The Waitahanui River is a river in the North Island of New Zealand.

== Location ==
The Waitahanui River is one of the three main rivers that flow into Lake Taupō (the others being the Tongariro River and the Tauranga Taupō River). The Waitahanui flows out of the foothills of the Kaimanawa Ranges and is crossed by State Highway 1 as the river passes through the township of Waitahanui, before entering Lake Taupō.

== Fishing ==
The Waitahanui is a popular fishing stream. Rainbow trout run up the river in winter to spawn and brown trout enter the river in autumn. At times anglers stand shoulder to shoulder across the rivermouth, trying to catch trout as they move out of the lake, a formation nicknamed the 'Picket Fence'.
