= Manaia (legendary chief) =

Chief of Hawaiki in Māori mythology

In Māori mythology, Manaia was a chief of the mythological land Hawaiki. He developed a fierce rivalry with his brother-in-law Ngātoro-i-rangi, the ancestor of Ngati Tuwharetoa, but was defeated by him in Hawaiki at the battles of Ihumotomotokia and Tarai-whenua-kura. Eventually, he led a great fleet to attack Ngātoro-i-rangi in New Zealand, but the whole fleet was destroyed by the storm Te Aputahi-a-Pawa and Manaia drowned.

== Life ==
Manaia was born on Hawaiki and was married to Kuiwai, the sister of Ngātoro-i-rangi, a powerful tohunga, who travelled to New Zealand and became the ancestor of Ngati Tuwharetoa. After Ngātoro-i-rangi had departed for New Zealand on the Arawa canoe, Manaia held a feast, at which the food cooked by Kuiwai was found to be under-cooked. Manaia angrily cursed her and threatened to cook her brother Ngātoro-i-rangi as poorly as Kuiwai had cooked the meal - a powerful curse. Kuiwai invoked the gods Kahukura, Itupawa, and Rongomai and received approval to send warning to Ngātoro-i-rangi in New Zealand. Her sister Haungaroa made the journey with some other women, eventually finding him at Maketu in the Bay of Plenty.

=== Battles of Ihumotomotokia and Tarai-whenua-kura ===
Ngātoro-i-rangi performed rituals to ward off the curse, cursed Manaia in return, and set out for Hawaiki with a force of 140 men with a force to take vengeance on Manaia. They built a canoe called Totara-keria from a tree that they found in the Waewaetutuki swamp. They travelled in the canoe for seven days until they reached Hawaiki. At the village of Whaitirikapapa, Manaia's priests prayed continuously for the deaths of Ngātoro-i-rangi and his allies and were so confident that they would win easily that they prepared large ovens to cook Ngātoro-i-rangi and his warriors. Ngātoro-i-rangi landed at Tata-i-whenua in Hawaiki, snuck into Whaitirikapapa and learnt about all of this. He and his men lay down inside the ovens, bloodied themselves, and pretended to be dead, thus laying an ambush. In their over-confidence, Manaia's men assumed that the priests' incantations had successfully killed their enemies and delivered them to the ovens. They advanced recklessly and all Manaia's men and priests were killed; only Manaia himself survived. This battle was known as Ihumotomotokia ("the battle of the bruised noses") because the victors had bloodied themselves by punching their own noses.

Manaia went around to the villages of Hawaiki and gathered a new army to attack the invaders. They attacked one of Ngātoro-i-rangi's men, Rangitu, as he was collecting water for the return voyage in a calabash. He defended himself with the calabash itself, fled to the beach, raised the alarm, and killed one of the pursuers with his whalebone mere. Manaia's men were defeated on the beach, but he escaped again. This battle was called Tarai-whenua-kura.

=== Storm of Te Aputahi-a-Pawa ===
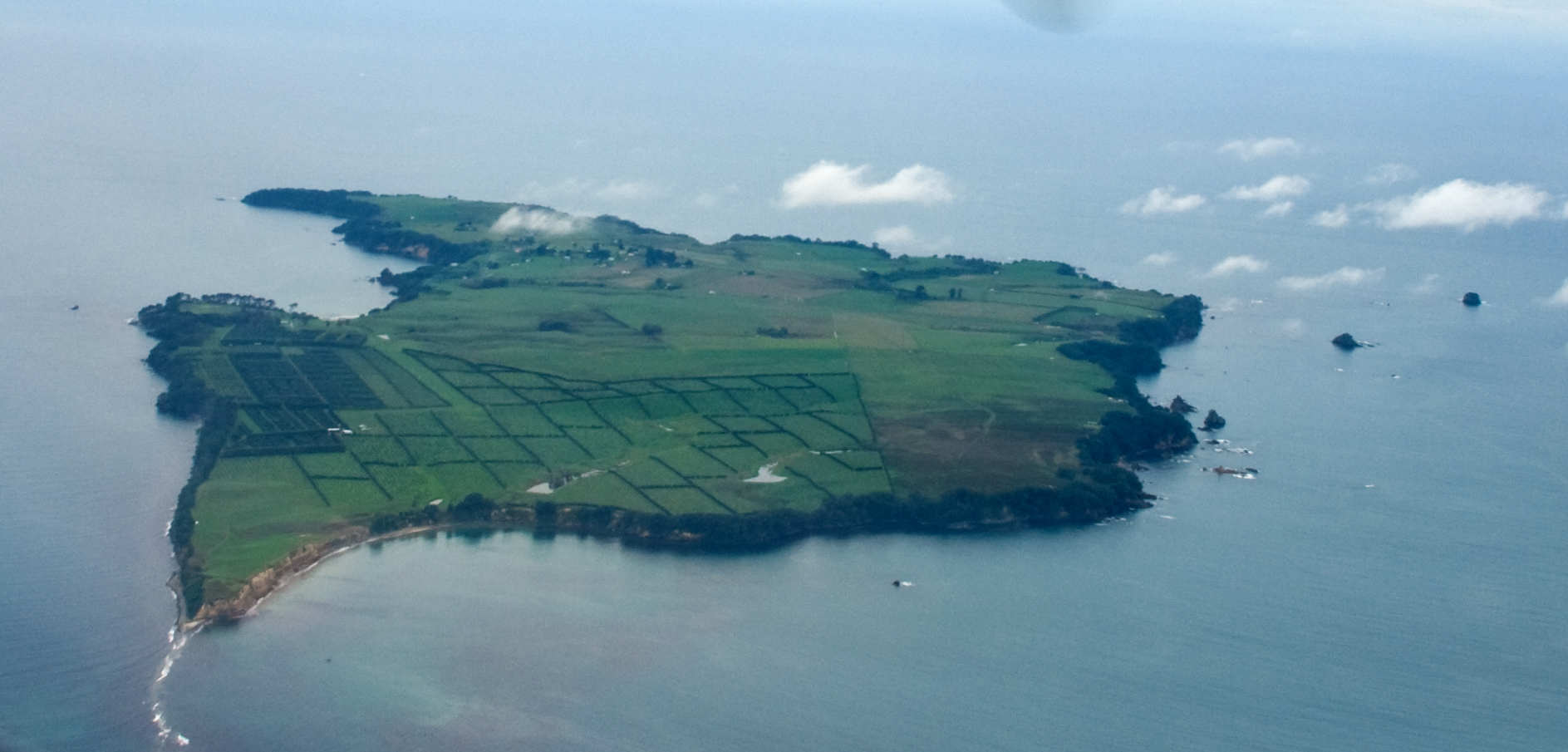
Mōtītī Island.

Ngātoro-i-rangi returned to New Zealand and settled at Matarehua on Mōtītī Island, where he built a house for himself and his wife called Taimaihi-o-Tongo. Manaia gathered an army and set sail to New Zealand to attack them. Manaia sailed into the bay beneath Matarehua, when Ngātoro-i-rangi and his wife were alone on the island, and Manaia issued a challenge. Ngātoro-i-rangi came out and told Manaia to wait until dawn, so that they could see each other when they fought. Ngātoro-i-rangi and his wife, however, performed incantations overnight, as a result of which Tāwhirimātea, the god of wind and storms, sent a great storm called Te Aputahi-a-Pawa that destroyed Manaia's canoes and killed Manaia himself.

Only one canoe from Manaia's fleet escaped, Te Pungapunga. A crewman from this canoe swam ashore and settled at Maketu, where he had descendants.

== Bibliography ==
- Grace, John Te Herekiekie (1970) [1959]. Tuwharetoa: The history of the Maori people of the Taupo District. Auckland [N.Z.]: A.H. & A.W. Reed. ISBN 9780589003739.
- Stafford, D.M. (1967). Te Arawa: A History of the Arawa People. Rotorua, New Zealand: A.H. & A.W. Reed.
- R.D. Craig, Dictionary of Polynesian Mythology (Greenwood Press: New York, 1989), 154.
- E.R. Tregear, Maori-Polynesian Comparative Dictionary (Lyon and Blair: Lambton Quay 1891), 203–204.
