= Matahi Brightwell =

New Zealand carver and waka ama founder (born 1952)

Matahi Brightwell ONZM
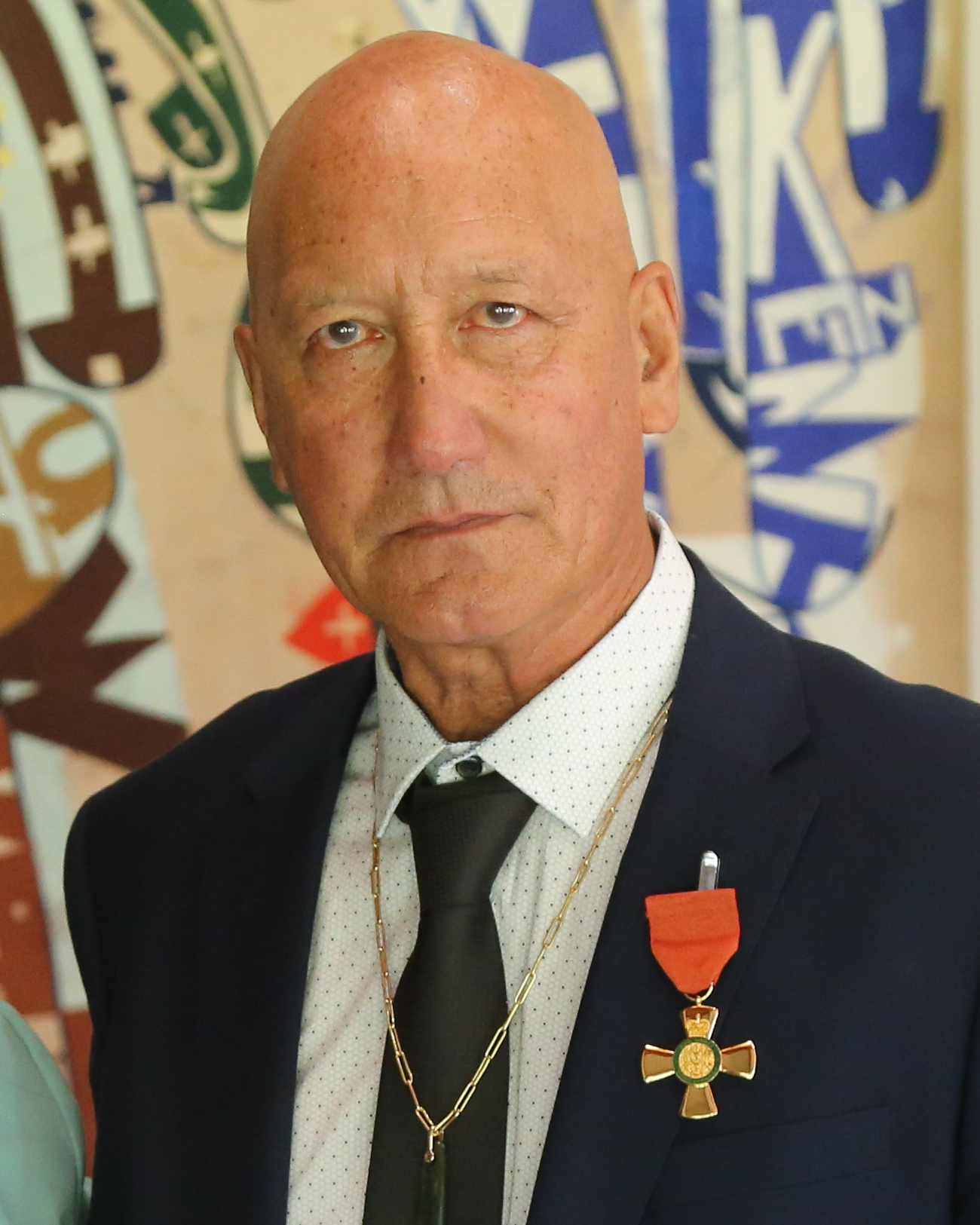
- Brightwell in 2022 after being awarded the New Zealand Order of Merit
- Born: Gregory John Brightwell; 22 July 1952 (age 74); Masterton, New Zealand
- Other names: Matahi Whakataka Brightwell; Matahi Avauli Brightwell
- Occupation: Master carver
- Known for: Reintroducing waka ama in New Zealand
- Notable work: Sculpture of Ngātoro-i-rangi at Mine Bay, Lake Taupō

Matahi Whakataka Brightwell ONZM (born Gregory John Brightwell; 22 July 1952) is a New Zealand master carver. He reintroduced the waka ama sport (outrigger canoe racing) in New Zealand.

His notable artworks include a sculpture in cliffside stone of Ngātoro-i-rangi at Mine Bay, Lake Taupō, carved from 1976 to 1980, which has been recognised as important to the district and local iwi. In 1985, he built the canoe Hawaikinui-1 in Tahiti, which he and others sailed to New Zealand to reflect Māori migration from Polynesia to New Zealand.

== Early life, family and carvings ==
Brightwell was born in 1952 in Masterton, New Zealand. He is of Kāti Huirapa, Ngāti Toa, Te Roro-o-te-Rangi (Ngāti Whakaue), Ngāti Tunohopu and Rongowhakaata descent. Brightwell was a pallbearer for James K. Baxter at his funeral in 1972, and participated in the Māori Land March in 1975.

In 1978, Brightwell carved a tipuna whare (ancestral house) for Ngāti Toa at Takapūwāhia as well as an ancestral pouwhenua for the Kāti Huirapa hapū in the South Island. In 1980, he completed a pouwhenua recording the whakapapa of Parekōhatu, the mother of Te Rauparaha, installed at Tawatawa Reserve in Wellington. In 2022, Brightwell and his daughter Taupuru Ariki Whakataka Brightwell collaborated on restoring and re-designing this pouwhenua. A tōtara sculpture he created in 1998 is held in the art collection at Te Papa, New Zealand's national museum.

In February 2023, Brightwell lost artworks, sculptures, and waka when his Gisborne house was damaged during Cyclone Gabrielle.

== Ngātoro-i-rangi sculpture ==
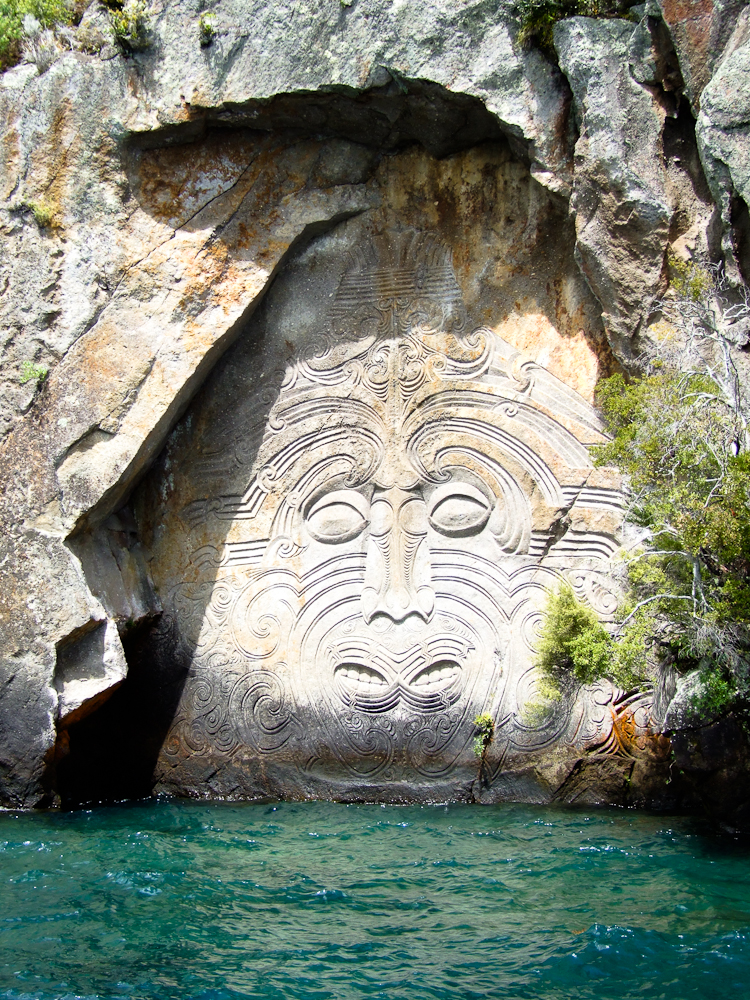
Brightwell's sculpture of Ngātoro-i-rangi at Mine Bay

From 1976 to 1980, Brightwell worked with a team of four others to carve a 14-metre-high (46 ft) sculpture of Ngātoro-i-rangi into the cliffside at Mine Bay, Lake Taupō. The sculpture is surrounded by smaller sculptures of tūpuna (ancestors) and kaitiaki (guardians). Brightwell's grandmother, Te Huatahi Susie Gilbert, had requested that he carve a sculpture of Ngātoro-i-rangi, and Brightwell had been unable to find a suitable tōtara tree.

The sculpture was initially controversial, with a local councillor complaining that "outsiders should not be cutting into our rock". Brightwell decided to leave the sculpture's eyes blank due to the negative reception.

In November 2016, a blessing took place to recognise the importance of the Ngātoro-i-rangi sculpture to the Taupō district and local iwi. Brightwell carved a smaller version of the sculpture on tōtara, Ngatoroirangi Iti, which was displayed at the Taupō visitor centre. In 2019, Brightwell sought donations to support the restoration of some of the smaller sculptures as well as carvers who could take over maintenance.

== Waka carving and waka ama ==
Brightwell has said that he sees waka carving as an artform akin to his sculptural carving. A wooden paddle carved by Brightwell in 1994 is in the collection of the British Museum.

In 1985, Brightwell built the 22 m (72 ft) double-hulled canoe Hawaikinui-1 in Tahiti, using wood from tōtara trees from Whirinaki Te Pua-a-Tāne Conservation Park. To emulate Māori migration from Polynesia to New Zealand, he sailed it to Rarotonga and New Zealand under Tahitian captain Francis Cowan, arriving on 6 January 1986 at Ōkahu Bay, Ōrākei, after a three-month voyage. He was awarded the Blue Water Medal, presented by Paul Reeves, for this achievement. The canoe was subsequently displayed at the Musée de Tahiti et des Îles in Tahiti. His time living in Tahiti also led him to encounter the waka ama sport, which he and his wife Raipoia brought back to New Zealand.

Brightwell founded the Mareikura Canoe Club shortly after, and travelled around New Zealand reintroducing waka ama to local Māori. The club has since developed into the nationwide Waka Ama Club organisation with over 80 clubs. For this work, Brightwell was bestowed with the Samoan chief's title of Avauli in 1998, was named Māori Sports Coach of the Year in 2002 and has been inducted into the New Zealand Waka Ama Hall of Fame. In the 2022 Queen's Birthday and Platinum Jubilee Honours, Brightwell was appointed an Officer of the New Zealand Order of Merit, for services to waka ama.
