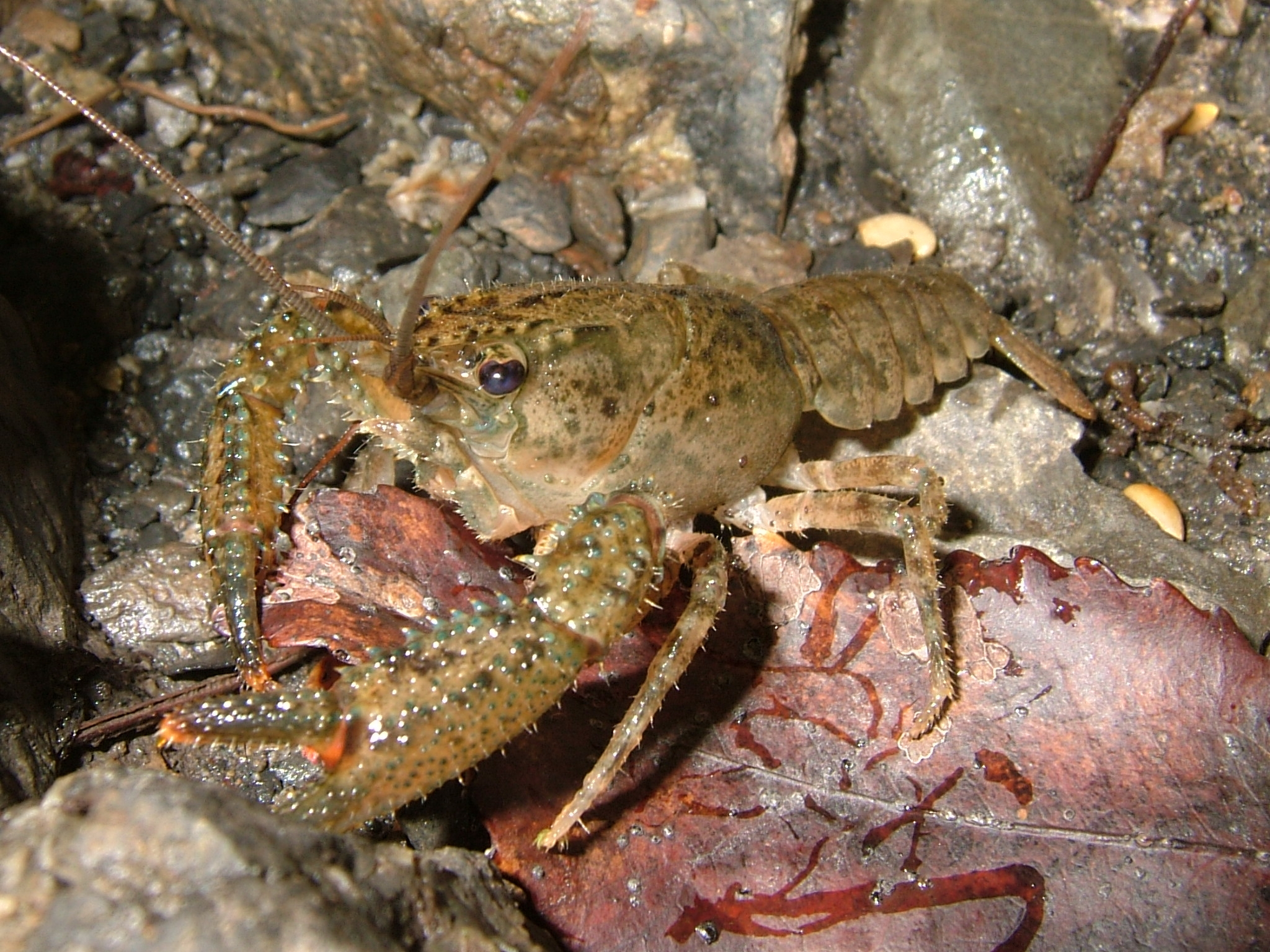

Conservation status
- Least Concern (IUCN 3.1)

Scientific classification
- Kingdom: Animalia
- Phylum: Arthropoda
- Clade: Pancrustacea
- Class: Malacostraca
- Order: Decapoda
- Suborder: Pleocyemata
- Family: Parastacidae
- Genus: Paranephrops
- Species: P. zealandicus

Binomial name
- Paranephrops zealandicus (White, 1847)
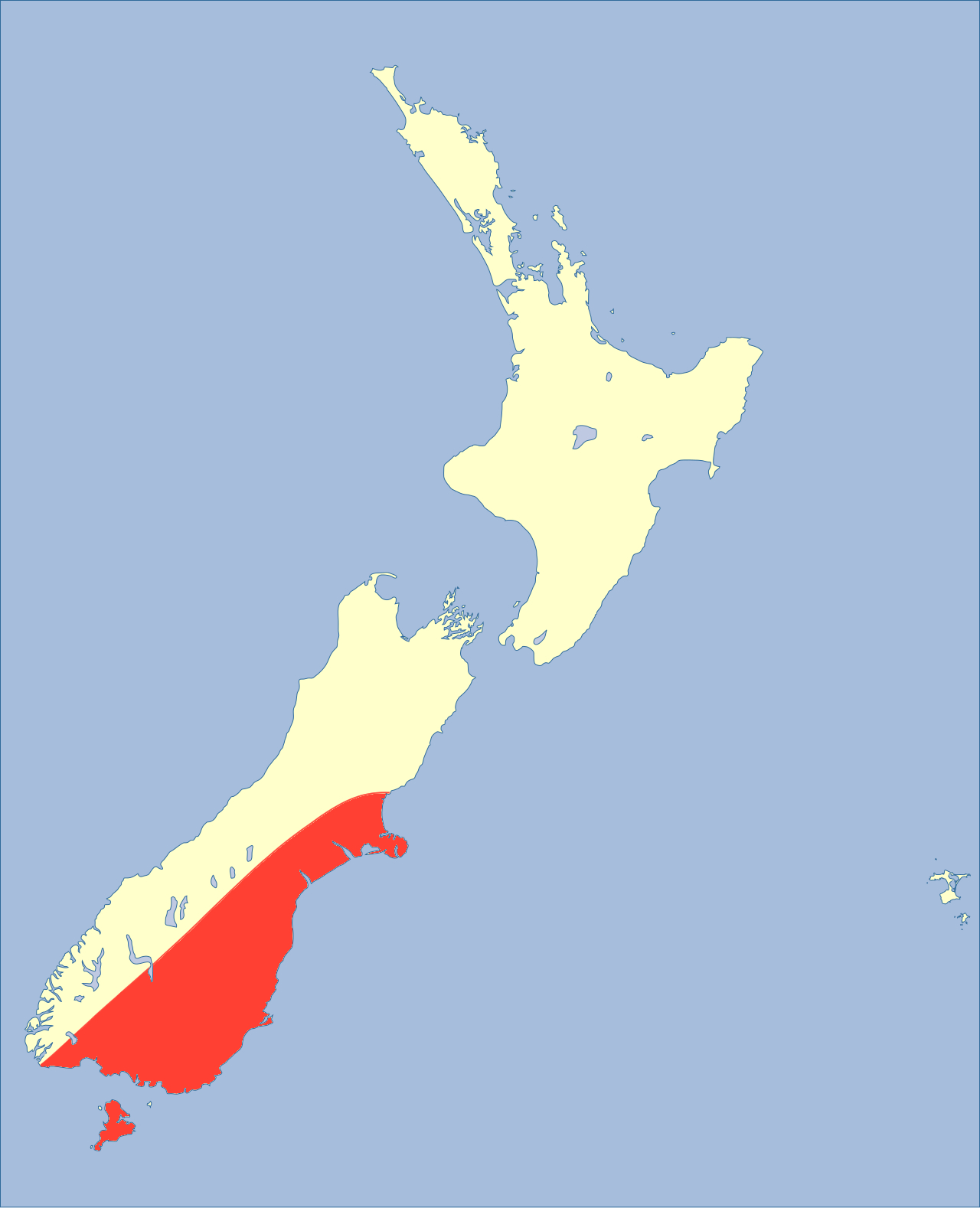

= Paranephrops zealandicus =

Species of crayfish

Paranephrops zealandicus or southern kōura (Māori: kōura) is a species of southern crawfish in the family Parastacidae. It is found in New Zealand.

The IUCN conservation status of Paranephrops zealandicus is "LC", least concern, with no immediate threat to the species' survival.

== Description ==
Paranephrops zealandicus is larger than the northern kōura, Paranephrops planifrons, and has relatively hairier front claws.

== Catching ==
The catching of Paranephrops zealandicus is also known as yabbying in southern New Zealand, not to be confused with the common yabby.
