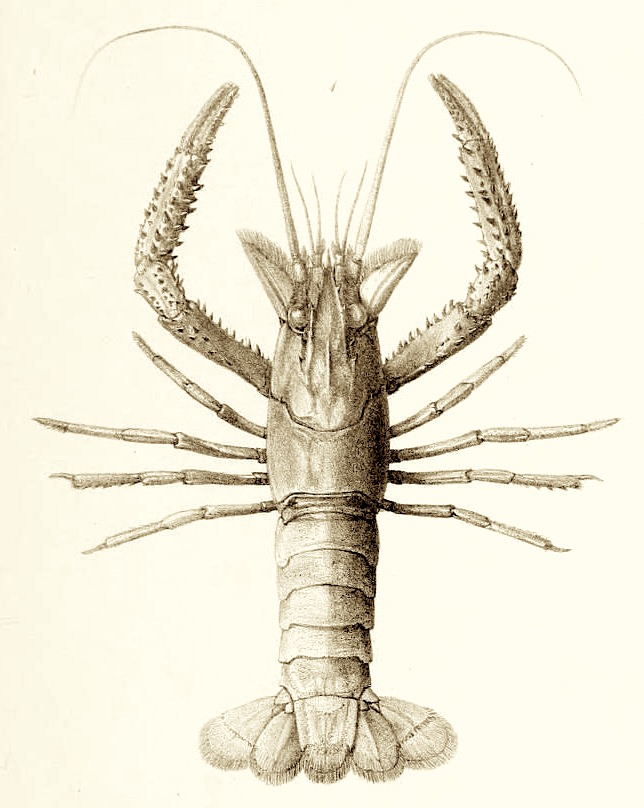
- Northern koura, P. planifrons

Scientific classification
- Kingdom: Animalia
- Phylum: Arthropoda
- Clade: Pancrustacea
- Class: Malacostraca
- Order: Decapoda
- Suborder: Pleocyemata
- Family: Parastacidae
- Genus: Paranephrops; White, 1842

Species
- P. planifrons White, 1842; P. zealandicus (White, 1847)

= Paranephrops =

Genus of crayfishes

Paranephrops is a genus of freshwater crayfish found only in New Zealand. They are known by the English common name freshwater crayfish and the Māori kōura (also written as koura in case lacking macrons).

== Species ==
The two species are:

Image	Name	Distribution
	northern koura, Paranephrops planifrons	the North Island, but also in Marlborough, Nelson, and the West Coast of the South Island
	southern koura, Paranephrops zealandicus	the eastern and southern of the South Island and on Stewart Island / Rakiura

Both species are a traditional food for Māori, and a small koura aquaculture industry supplies the restaurant market.

== Description ==
The northern koura (P. planifrons) reaches lengths of about 70 mm (2.8 in), whereas the southern koura (P. zealandicus) is slightly larger – 80 mm (3.1 in) – with relatively shorter antennae. Their first pair of legs (chelipeds) are pincers used for scavenging food and warding off predators or other koura. The chelipeds in P. zealandicus are much hairier at their tips than those of P. planifrons. The four pairs of well-developed walking legs are used for most movement, but the pleopods are small and no use for swimming; when alarmed, koura can flick their tails forward violently to propel themselves backwards at speed. They can be sexed by looking at their underside; males have a pair of gonads that protrude from the base of the fourth pair of legs, while females have holes at the base of the second pair of legs.

== Ecology ==
=== Diet ===
Koura in natural populations are omnivorous scavengers, consuming a variety of foods, with animal protein contributing the most to growth. Invertebrates including aquatic snails, chironomids, and mayflies are the main food source. Juvenile koura require higher amounts of protein in their diet than adults due to greater growth rate demands with invertebrates forming the bulk of their diet. Koura in lakes have been shown to feed predominantly in the littoral zone where food availability is greatest. Feeding in the littoral zone may reflect diel movement with koura moving to deeper and darker parts of lakes to avoid predation during daylight hours and moving to the littoral zone at night to feed.

=== Habitat ===
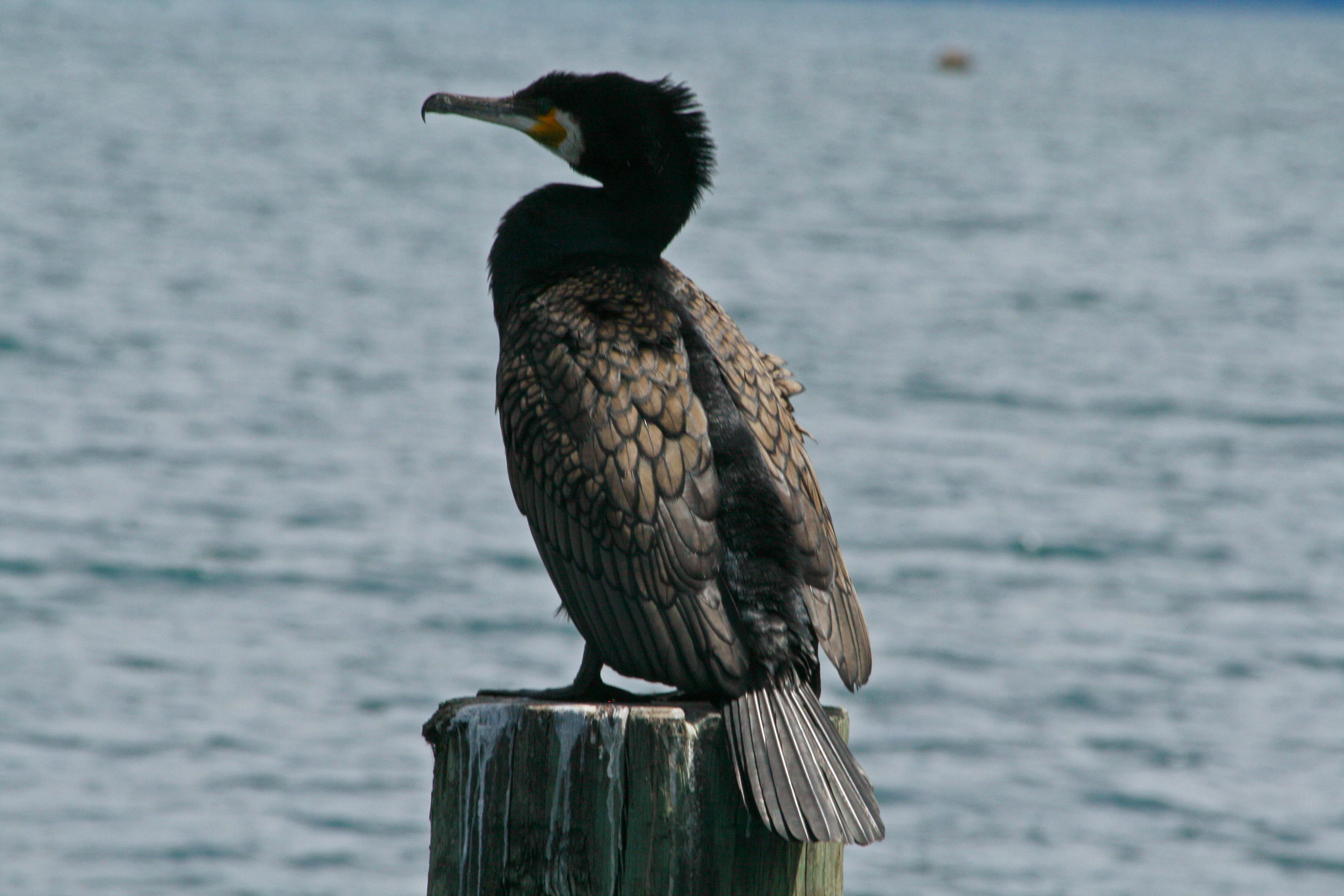
Paranephrops forms much of the diet of the black shag in the Rotorua lakes

Koura occupy freshwater lakes, streams, rivers, and swamps, in mud or gravel substrates. Koura are nocturnal, moving into shallower water at night and deeper water column during the day. During daytime, they find shelter under rocks, debris such as cans and bottles, and vegetation. In soft sediments they may also excavate burrows or fan shaped depressions, in Lake Rotoiti at depths of 5–10 metres (16–33 ft). In streams, koura take cover on the bottom beneath fallen leaf litter, fallen logs, and tree roots and undercut banks. Tree fern roots that project into the stream are thought to provide excellent cover for juveniles. Fossil evidence of Paranephrops in Pleistocene sediment demonstrate occurrence in or near marginal-marine habitat, unfortunately there is little published literature about occurrences of fossilized Paranephrops.

=== Predators, cannibalism and disease ===
Eels, perch, catfish, and trout are the major aquatic predators of koura. Terrestrial predators include rats, kingfishers, shags, scaup, stoats, and kiwi. Shag populations in the Rotorua lakes district in the North Island of New Zealand have been shown to feed on koura as the bulk of their diet. Predation on koura by trout is thought to be restricted to larger adult trout. Streams and lakes with established populations of trout have been shown to affect koura abundance. Cannibalism in koura is most likely to occur when koura are sick or moulting. Cannibalism can be a greater problem in high-density situations where competition for shelter and territory is greatest. Juvenile koura can be consumed whole by larger koura, and this presents problems for aquaculture in ensuring continuity of intergenerational growth. Koura use their chelae for both attack and defence, and when one limb is lost, the koura will divert energy for overall growth to restoring the lost limb. The only disease known to seriously affect koura is "white tail disease" caused by the microsporidian parasite Thelohania contejeani. This parasite causes degeneration of striated muscle in the tail area, which turns the tail a pale white colour and correspondingly leads to death soon after.

== Growth ==
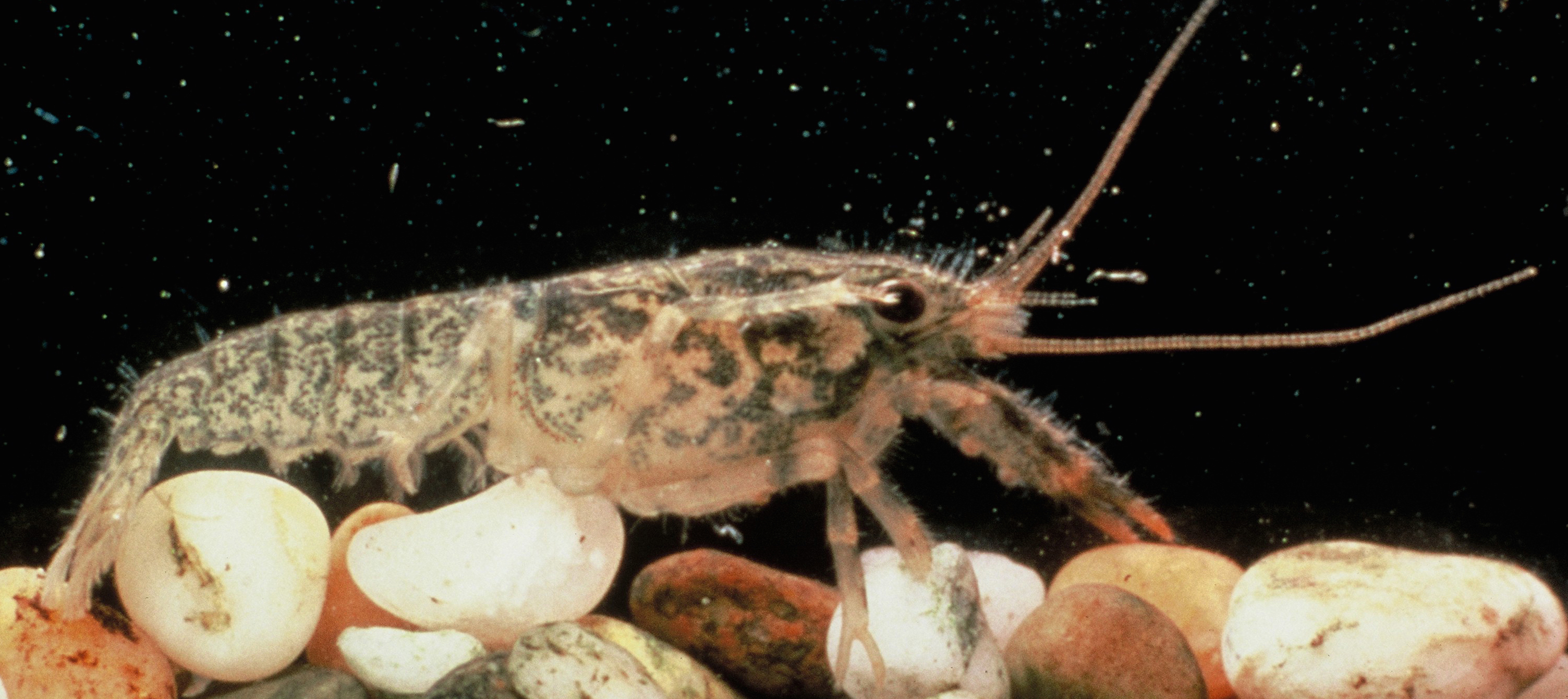
Northern crayfish, P. planifrons

Koura, like all crustaceans, moult their exoskeletons to increase in size. During moulting, the carapace becomes soft with calcium being resorbed and the remaining outer shell shed. The new carapace forms underneath, where it takes a number of days to harden. Calcium for this new outer shell comes from gastroliths that line the stomach wall of the koura, and these produce around 10–20% of the calcium needs for exoskeleton production. The gastroliths drop into the koura's foregut, where they are broken down to allow the adsorption of calcium. After moulting, the demand for calcium to harden the exoskeleton is high, and this demand is met in part by the koura eating its discarded exoskeleton. The remaining calcium required to completely harden the exoskeleton is achieved by absorption from the water. A lower limit of 5 mg/L of calcium in water for temperate species of koura has been suggested as sufficient to support exoskeleton hardening.

Water temperature and calcium concentrations are thought to be the key variables determining koura growth rates. P. zealandicus has high survivability (>80%) rates below 16 °C (61 °F), but temperatures above this correlate with lower rates of survivability. Higher death rates are thought to be associated with increased activity of koura at higher temperatures. Greater activity by koura increases cannibalistic behavior, and increased activity may also affect water quality with the greater production of ammonia as a waste product. Survival of koura also increases with higher calcium concentrations in the water, and this is thought to be in part due to a lower incidence of moulting-related deaths and decreased risk from predation. A calcium concentration value of 20–30 mg/L in water is thought to be ideal for maintaining koura growth and survivability in aquaculture setups.

== Reproduction ==
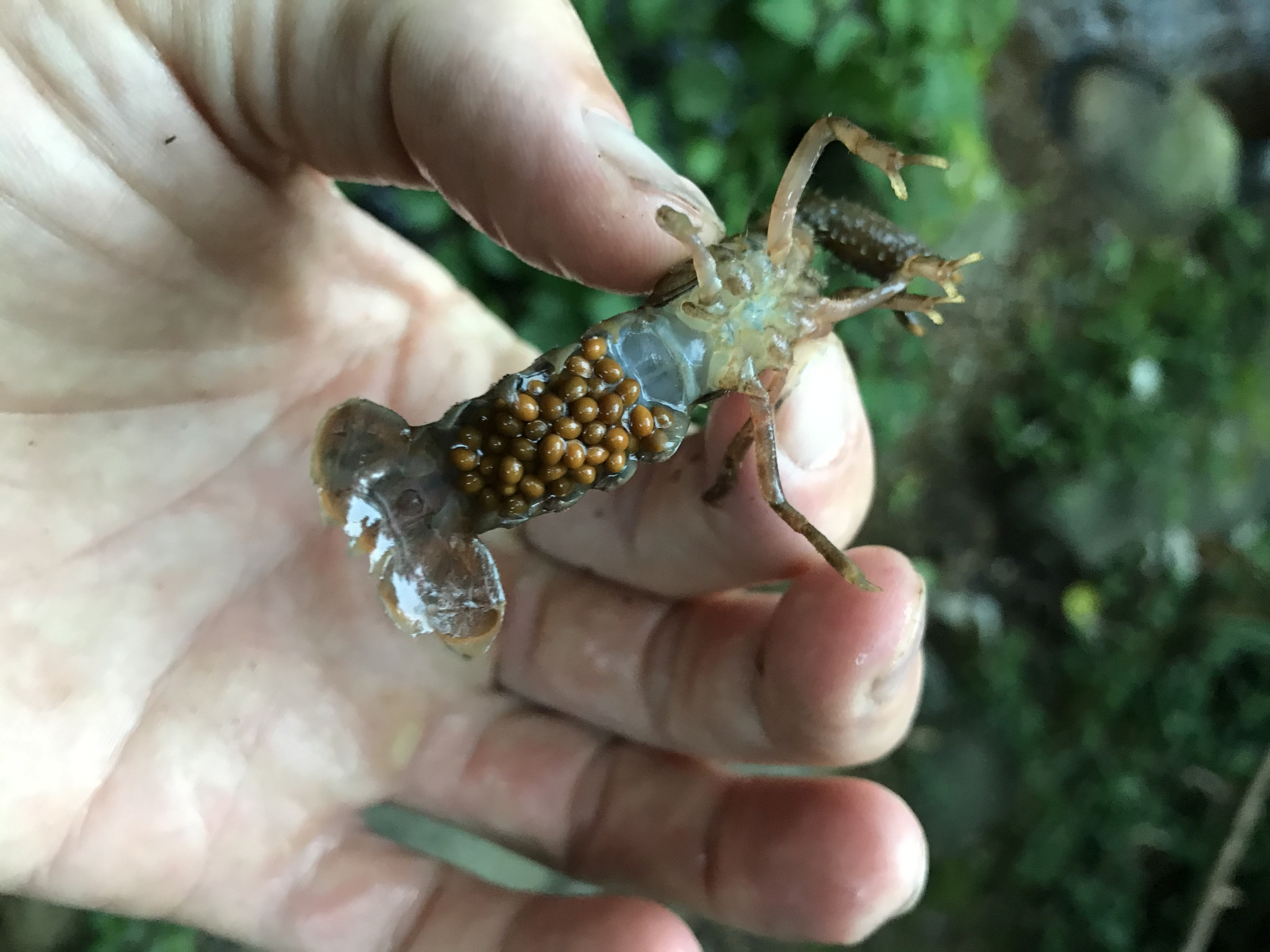
Paranephrops planifrons female carrying eggs

The female carries 20–200 eggs under the side flaps of her abdomen, where they take 3–4 months to hatch. Over this time, male sperm production corresponds with females' reproductivity. Once hatched, juvenile koura cling to their mother's abdomen using their pincers to attach until they have reached a length of 4–10 mm (0.16–0.39 in). At this stage, they resemble adult koura in appearance, having undergone two moults. In Lake Rotoiti in the central North Island of New Zealand, the main breeding period occurs between April and July (autumn–winter), with a second breeding period occurring from October–January (spring–summer). The total breeding length time from peak egg laying to the release of juveniles is estimated to be 28 weeks for the autumn–winter period and 19–20 weeks in spring–summer breeding groups. This difference is attributed to warmer temperatures speeding up the egg development process. In stream populations, this growth period has been shown to take around 25–26 weeks in P. planifrons, and up to 60 weeks for P. zealandicus in Otago streams.

== Aquaculture ==
Farming of koura is currently undertaken by a small number of companies within New Zealand. Sweet Koura Enterprises Ltd and New Zealand Clearwater Crayfish Ltd are two such operators. Koura is sold solely to the high-end restaurant trade, where they are commonly eaten as an entrée dish. Koura are harvestable once larger than 100 mm (3.9 in) in total length, which can take 2–5 years in P. planifrons. Sweet Koura Enterprises Ltd, located in Central Otago, within the South Island of New Zealand, farm P. zealandicus in artificial ponds around 200 m^{2} (2,200 sq ft) in size. These ponds attempt to replicate the natural environment where P. zealandicus grows. Water supplied to the growing ponds is sourced from an aquifer and is artificially aerated. The temperature of the water is controlled to reflect the seasonal temperature variations that would be expected in the natural environment. The optimal temperature for growth in these ponds is achieved at 15–18 °C (59–64 °F), with P. zealandicus sensitive to rapid temperature changes. The natural biological life in a pond can support 3–4 koura per m^{2}. Additional feed in the form of fish-based pellets is supplied to koura to support growth; this feed has been altered to reflect the lower-protein, higher-calcium nutritional requirements of koura. Overstocking of crayfish can lead to higher rates of mortality, which is associated with higher rates of cannibalism and increased competition for shelter and food.

New Zealand Clearwater Crayfish Ltd farm grows the northern koura species P. planifrons using a gravity-fed system with pond culture and raceways. A key step in this koura farm is the depuration of koura in clean running water without food for up to 2 days to purge the gut cavity. This enables the tail to be presented as an appealing white flesh to the consumer.

To breed koura in aquaculture a ratio of one male to five females is suggested during the mating periods, with koura removed and placed in separate tanks according to the life stage once hatched. The creation of artificial habitat in ponds may support koura survival. Plastic containers, tyres, plastic piping, and bottles are all possible habits for koura to occupy when being grown in ponds. The suggested depth for ponds used to farm P. zealandicus is 1.3–5.0 m (4 ft 3 in – 16 ft 5 in).

A number of environmental challenges exist for koura farmers in ensuring optimum growth and survivability of stock. Environmental contamination of fresh water supplied to ponds from other land use activities, such as livestock farming, can affect survival. Other risks come from the introduction into the ponds of predators such as carp, eels, and birds; however, these can be controlled by steps such as placing netting across pond surfaces. Algal blooms creating anoxic conditions and cannibalism caused by high-density stocking of ponds are also challenges to koura farmers.

The outlook for the growth of koura aquaculture in the New Zealand domestic setting may be positive, with the potential for increasing demand in the restaurant and tourism fields. Export of koura to the international market may offer less potential due to competition from other established freshwater crayfish species such as the red swamp crayfish Procambarus clarkii, of which the United States and China annually consume 34,000 tonnes and 88,000 tonnes, respectively.

== History ==
The kōura was formerly abundant in New Zealand, and was a major traditional food source for Māori. The two main ways that kōura could be caught are ruku kōura, free diving to collect crayfish, or tau kōura. Tau kōura are bundles of Pteridium esculentum (bracken fern) that were constructed and placed into the water, where the crayfish would begin to inhabit and feed on the fern spores. The bundles would be carefully lifted out with a net. Kōura was commonly eaten during the early colonial era in New Zealand, but became less popular due to habitat destruction and predation by introduced trout species.
