= Tauranga Taupō River =

Coordinates: 38.908943°S 175.900037°E

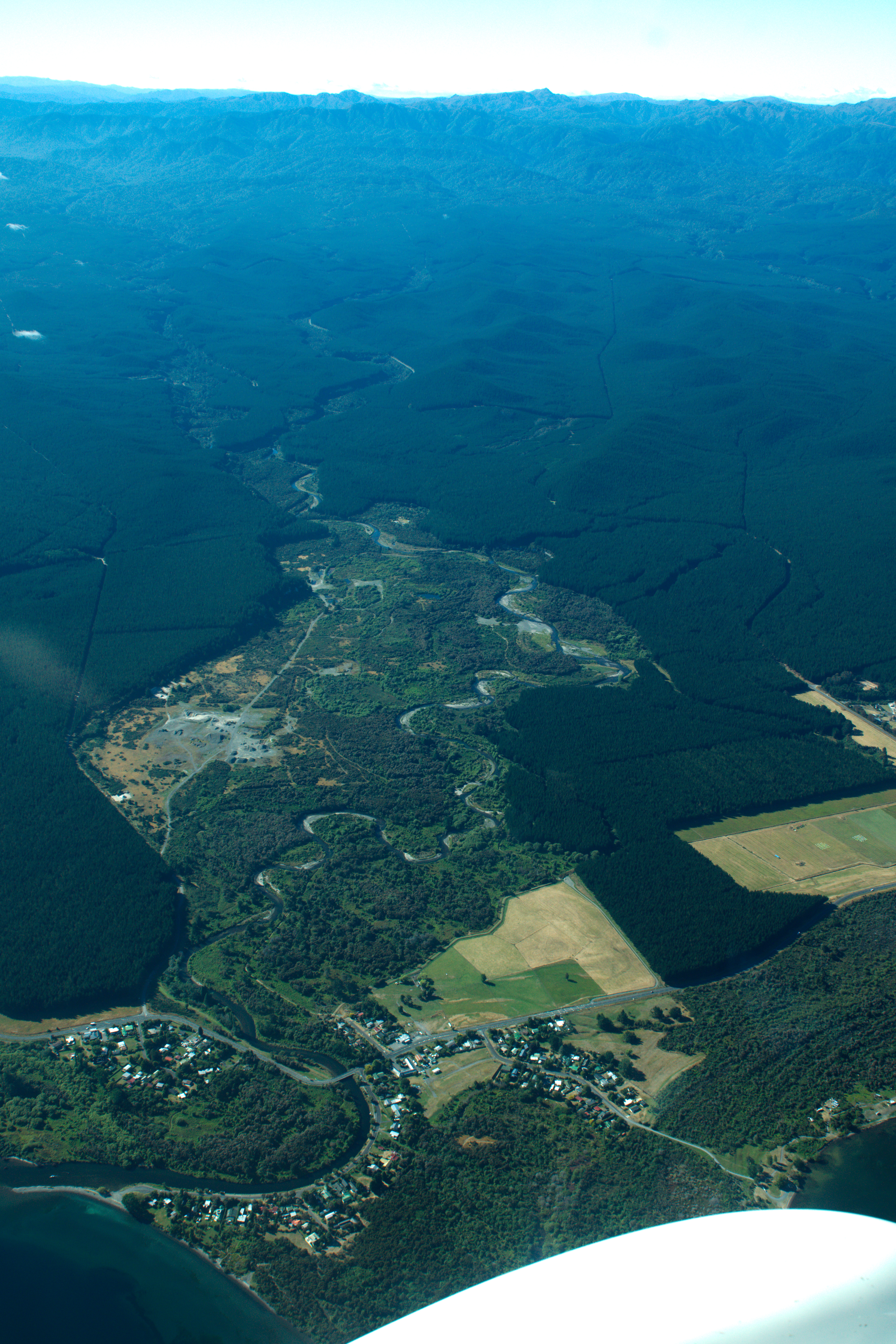
- Tauranga Taupō River and settlement

Location
- Country: New Zealand

Physical characteristics
- Source
  - location: Kaimanawa Range
- Mouth
  - location: Lake Taupō
- Length: 27 km (17 mi)

The Tauranga Taupō River is a river of the Waikato Region of New Zealand's North Island.

It flows northwest from its sources at the western face of the Kaimanawa Range and discharges on the eastern shore of Lake Taupō, close to the settlement of Te Rangiita, 12 kilometres (7 mi) northeast of Tūrangi.

== See also ==
- List of rivers of New Zealand
