= Lake Taupō =

New Zealand's largest lake

- Lake Taupo
- Māori: Taupō-nui-a-Tia; Taupōmoana
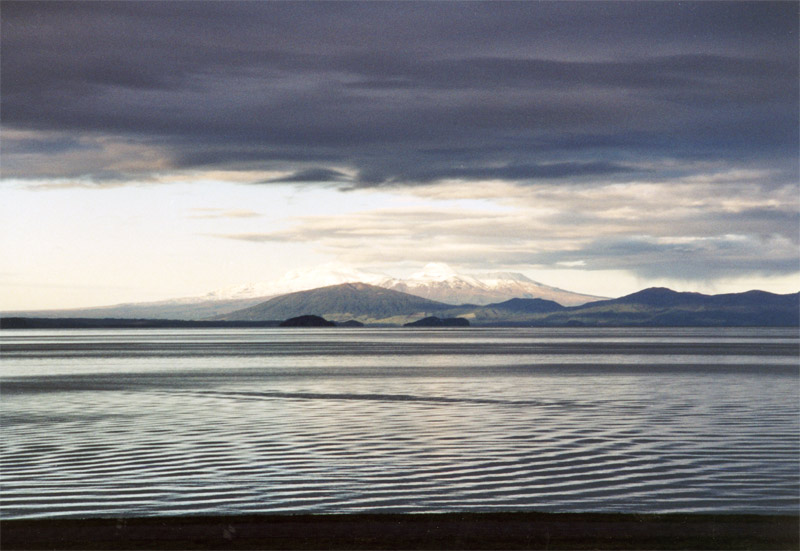

- Location within New Zealand Location within North Island
- Interactive map of Lake Taupō
- Location: Taupō District, Waikato region, North Island
- Coordinates: 38°48′25″S 175°54′28″E
- Type: Crater lake, oligotrophic
- Etymology: From Taupō-nui-a-Tia, Māori for "great cloak of Tia"
- Primary inflows: Waitahanui River, Tongariro River, Tauranga Taupō River
- Primary outflows: Waikato River
- Catchment area: 3,487 km^{2} (1,346 sq mi)
- Basin countries: New Zealand
- Max. length: 46 km (29 mi)
- Max. width: 33 km (21 mi)
- Surface area: 616 km^{2} (238 sq mi)
- Average depth: 110 m (360 ft)
- Max. depth: 186 m (610 ft)
- Water volume: 67.76 km^{3} (16.26 cu mi)
- Residence time: 10.5 years
- Shore length^{1}: 193 km (120 mi)
- Surface elevation: 356 m (1,168 ft)
- Islands: Motutaiko Island (11 ha)
- ^{1} Shore length is not a well-defined measure.

Lake Taupō (also spelled Taupo; Māori: Taupō-nui-a-Tia or Taupōmoana) is a large crater lake in New Zealand's North Island, located in the caldera of Taupō Volcano. The lake is the namesake of the town of Taupō, which sits on a bay in the lake's northeastern shore. With a surface area of 616 km^{2} (238 sq mi), it is the largest lake by surface area in New Zealand, and the second largest freshwater lake by surface area in geopolitical Oceania after Lake Murray in Papua New Guinea. Motutaiko Island lies in the southeastern area of the lake.

== Geography ==
Lake Taupō has a perimeter of approximately 193 km (120 mi) and a maximum depth of 186 m (610 ft). It is drained by the Waikato River (New Zealand's longest river), and its main tributaries are the Waitahanui River, the Tongariro River, and the Tauranga Taupō River. It is a noted trout fishery with stocks of introduced brown and rainbow trout.

The level of the lake is controlled by Mercury Energy, the owner of the eight hydroelectric dams on the Waikato River downstream of Lake Taupō, using gates built in 1940–41. The gates are used to reduce flooding, conserve water and ensure a minimum flow of 50 m^{3}/s (1,800 cu ft/s) in the Waikato River. The resource consent allows the level of the lake to be varied between 355.85 and 357.25 metres (1,167.5 and 1,172.1 ft) above sea level.

== Lake formation and volcanism ==
Lake Taupō is in a caldera created mainly by a supervolcanic eruption which occurred approximately 25,600 years ago. According to geological records, the volcano has erupted 29 times in the last 30,000 years. It has ejected mostly rhyolitic lava, although Mount Tauhara formed from dacitic lava.

Taupō has been active for 300,000 years with a very large event known as the Oruanui eruption occurring approximately 25,600 years ago. It was the world's largest known eruption over the past 70,000 years, ejecting 1170 cubic kilometres of material and causing several hundred square kilometres of surrounding land to collapse and form the caldera. The caldera later filled with water to form Lake Taupō, eventually overflowing to cause a huge outburst flood.

Several later eruptions occurred over the millennia before the most recent major eruption, which was traditionally dated as about 181 CE from Greenland ice-core records. Tree ring data from two studies suggests a later date of 232 CE ± 5 and this is now accepted. Known as the Hatepe eruption, it is believed to have ejected 100 cubic kilometres of material, of which 30 cubic kilometres was ejected in a few minutes. This was one of the most powerful eruptions in the last 5000 years (alongside the Minoan eruption in the 2nd millennium BCE, the Tianchi eruption of Baekdu around 1000 CE and the 1815 eruption of Tambora), with a Volcanic Explosivity Index rating of 7; and there appears to be a correlation, to within a few years, of a year in which the sky was red over Rome and China. The eruption devastated much of the North Island and further expanded the lake. The area was uninhabited by humans at the time of the eruption, as New Zealand was not settled by Māori until about 1280. Possible climatic effects of the eruption would have been concentrated on the Southern Hemisphere due to the southerly position of Lake Taupō. Taupō's last known eruption occurred around 30 years later, with lava dome extrusion forming the Horomatangi Reefs, but that eruption was much smaller than the Hatepe eruption.

Underwater hydrothermal activity continues near the Horomatangi vent, and nearby geothermal fields with associated hot springs are found north and south of the lake, for example at Rotokawa and Tūrangi. These springs are the site of occurrence of certain extremophile micro-organisms, that are capable of surviving in extremely hot environments.

The volcano is considered active and is monitored by GNS Science.

== Biota ==
Much of the watershed of Lake Taupō is a beech and podocarp forest with associate understory ferns being Blechnum filiforme, Asplenium flaccidum, Doodia media, Hymenophyllum demissum, Microsorum pustulatum and Dendroconche scandens, and some prominent associate shrubs being Olearia rani and Alseuosmia quercifolia.

Native faunal species in the lake include northern kōura or crayfish (Paranephrops planifrons) and kōkopu or whitebait (Galaxias species). A community of sponges and associated invertebrates live around the underwater geothermal vents.

The lake is noted for brown trout (Salmo trutta morpha lacustris), introduced from Scotland via Tasmania, in 1887, followed by rainbow trout (Oncorhynchus mykiss) from California in 1898. There has also been a subsequent introduction of smelt (Retropinnidae species) as a food for the trout.

== Tourism ==
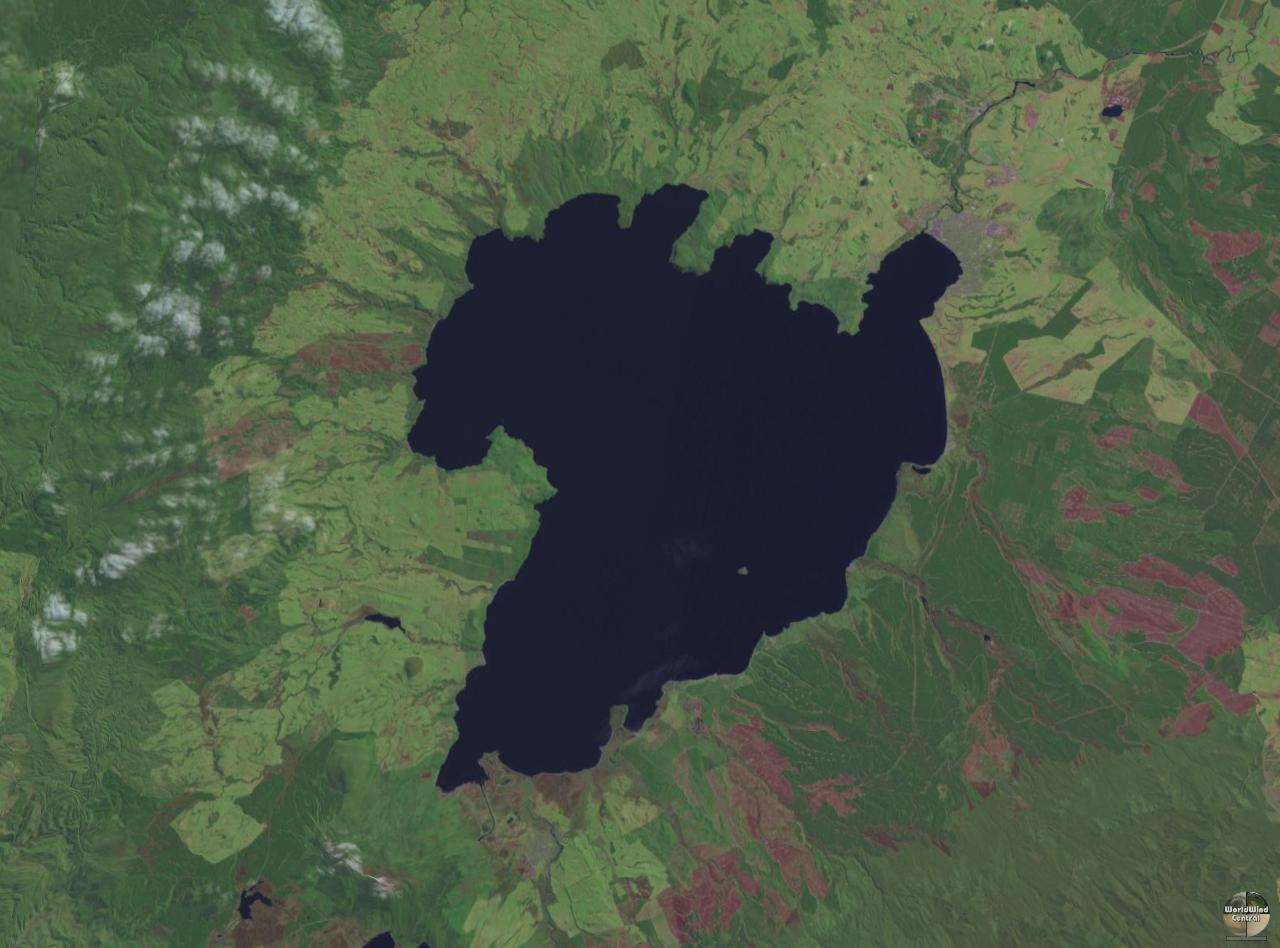
NASA satellite photo of Lake Taupō

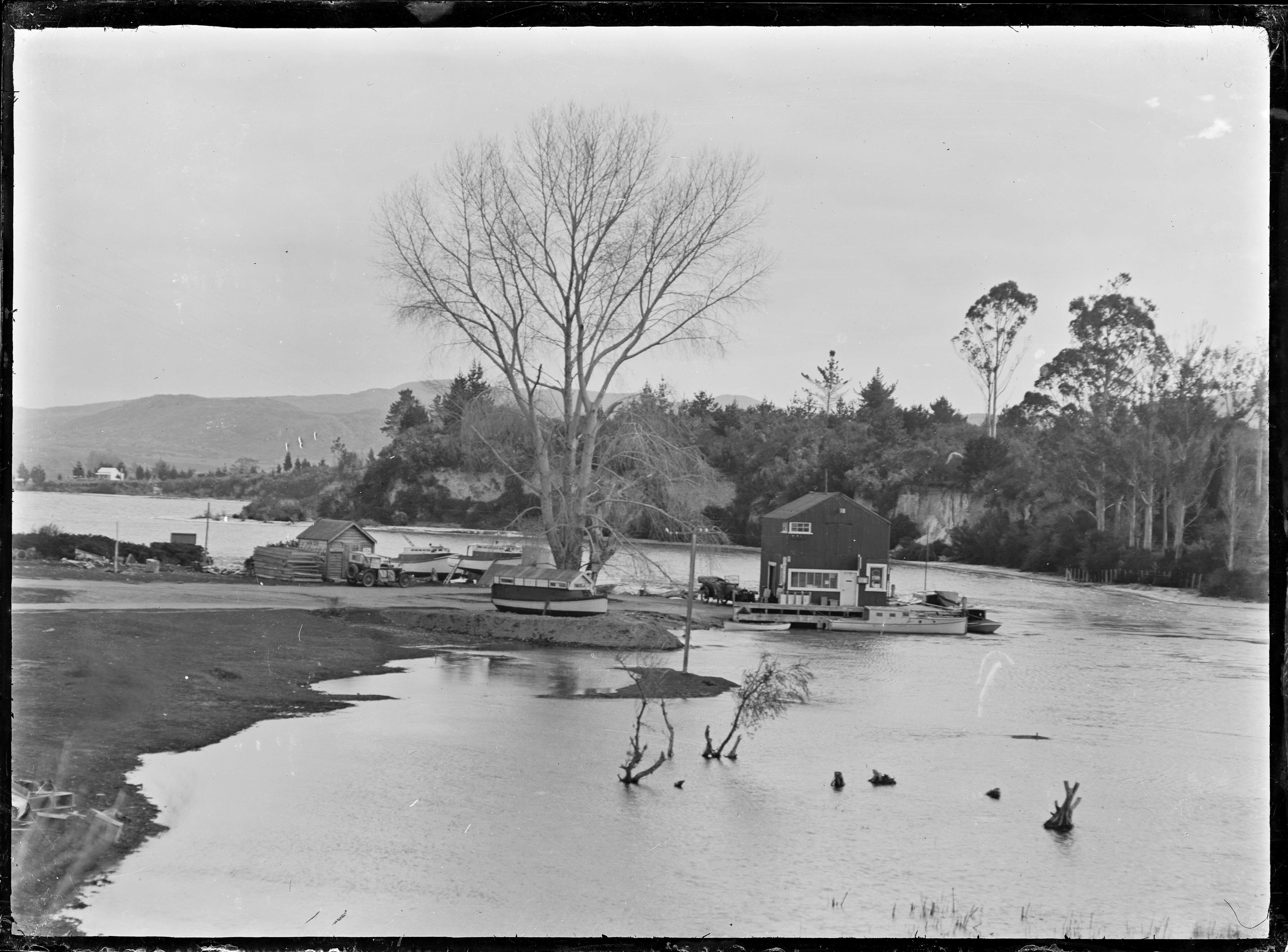
Wharf and small jetty where the Waikato River departs the lake, 1928

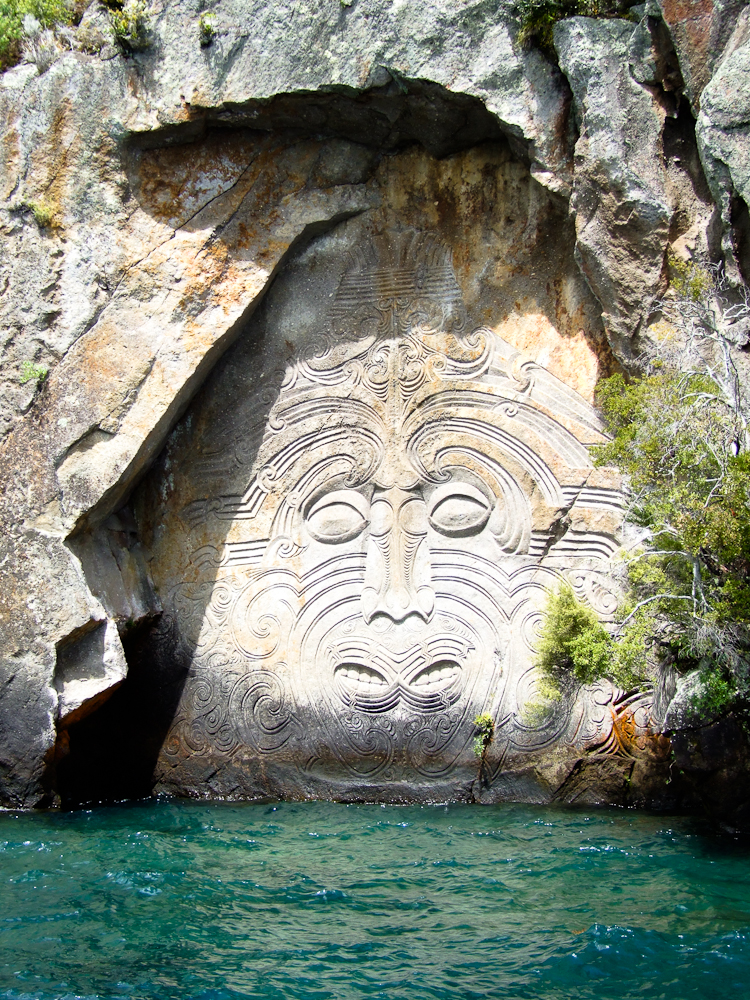
Māori rock carvings at Mine Bay are over 10 metres high and accessible only by boat or kayak.

Tourism is a major component of Taupō's commercial sector. The busiest time for the industry is the high summer season around Christmas and New Year.

The lake area has a temperate climate. Daily maximum temperatures recorded for Taupō range from an average of 23.3 °C in January and February to 11.2 °C in July, while the nighttime minimum temperatures range from 11.6 °C in February down to 2.2 °C in July. Rain falls in all seasons but is greatest in winter and spring, from June to December.

Taupō hosts the Lake Taupo Cycle Challenge, a cycling tour around the lake which can take anywhere between four and ten hours. Skydiving is a popular local sport and tourist attraction. Taupō also hosts the ANZCO Ironman event.

Crossing the 40.2 km length of the lake is a challenge for open-water swimmers. In 2020, Michael Wells from Darwin, Australia, was the first to breaststroke across the lake.

=== Māori rock carving ===
On the north-west side of Lake Taupō on the cliffs of Mine Bay, there are Māori rock carvings created in the late 1970s by Matahi Whakataka-Brightwell and John Randall. Carved in the likeness of Ngātoro-i-rangi, a navigator who guided the Tūwharetoa and Te Arawa tribes to the Taupō area over a thousand years ago according to Māori legend. The 10-metre-high carving is intended to protect Lake Taupō from volcanic activities underneath. The cliff has become a popular tourist destination with hundreds of boats and yachts visiting the spot yearly.

=== Māori iwi ===
Lake Taupō is a taonga (treasure or something special to the person) of Ngāti Tūwharetoa from the Te Arawa waka. Ngāti Tūwharetoa owns the bed of the lake and its tributaries. They grant the public free access for recreational use.

== History ==
Lake Taupō previously housed a Ngāti Tūwharetoa village known as Te Rapa near the springs of Maunga Kākaramea. It was covered in a landslide on 7 May 1846 which killed 60 people, including the iwi's chief Mananui Te Heuheu Tūkino II.

== See also ==
- List of lakes of New Zealand
- Taupō Volcanic Zone
