= Ngātoro-i-rangi =

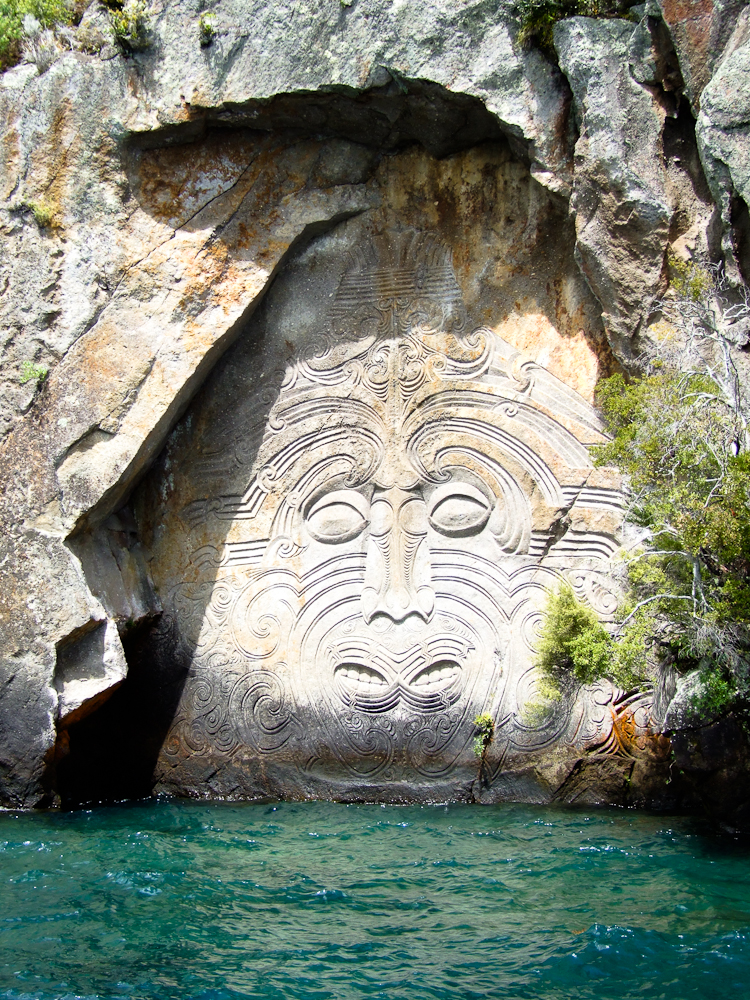
Depiction of Ngātoro-i-rangi at Mine Bay, created in the late 1970s by Matahi Whakataka-Brightwell and John Randall

In Māori tradition, Ngātoro-i-rangi (Ngātoro) is a tohunga (priest) prominent in the settling of New Zealand (Aotearoa) by the Māori people, who came from the traditional homeland Hawaiki on the Arawa canoe. He is the ancestor of Ngāti Tūwharetoa and his travels around Lake Taupō and the Volcanic Plateau are the basis of Ngāti Tūwharetoa's claim to those regions.

== Rangiātea ==
Ngātoro-i-rangi was the son of Rakauri and Hineruarangi and was raised at Te Vaitoa in Rangiātea. He was descended from the Ngāti Ohomairangi tribe and was direct successor to the high priest of Taputapuatea marae at Rangiātea. He also had ancestral connections to Aitutaki, Rarotonga, Rangiātea (Ra'iatea) and other islands in the area. Pūhaorangi, the father of Ohomairangi, was the progenitor of all of the Te Arawa people.

Ngātoro-i-rangi was trained at Taputapuātea marae as a priest and navigator and was renowned for his skills and status. He made a number of journeys around the islands of Hawaiki and eventually rose to become a powerful high priest with the mana (authority or right) to carry the most powerful of deities.

The people of Ngāti Ohomairangi formed two divisions. After the various battles in Hawaiki these two divisions decided to participate in the migration to New Zealand (Aotearoa), and set about building the two great waka (ships) Tainui and Arawa.

== Journey to Aotearoa ==
When the Tainui waka and Te Arawa waka were constructed it was intended that Ngātoro-i-rangi should command the Tainui canoe in its journey from Hawaiki to New Zealand. The two waka were anchored together for the initial sea tests before launching.

However, Ngātoro-i-rangi was persuaded by Tama-te-kapua to come aboard Te Arawa with his wife to perform the final rituals that would allow the waka to make for open water. While this was happening Tama-te-kapua ordered his crew to head for open water, and thus Ngātoro-i-rangi and his wife were kidnapped.

During the course of the voyage, Kearoa, the wife of Ngātoro-i-rangi, had been insulted by Tama-te-kapua. So, Ngātoro-i-rangi called upon a storm to drive the Arawa into Te Korokoro o Te Parata (The throat of Te Parata), a mid-ocean whirlpool. It was only when the shrieks of the women and children moved his heart with pity that Ngātoro-i-rangi relented, and let the canoe emerge safely.

== Central North Island ==
Upon reaching New Zealand (Aotearoa) Ngātoro-i-rangi left the waka at Te Awa o te Atua (near Matata) and headed inland. As he went about, springs of water appeared where he stamped his foot. These springs are still seen all over the area, such as Kawerau, around the Rotorua Lakes district, and through to Tokaanu. He also placed patupaiarehe (human-like spirit beings) on the hills around Maungawhakamana.

As he was crossing the plains near Tarawera, Ngātoro-i-rangi came across a strange figure named Te Tama-hoi. He was a demon (atua) who was directing evil spells towards Ngātoro-i-rangi. Ngātoro-i-rangi struggled against the demon and eventually overcame him. Ngātoro-i-rangi stamped his foot, opening a chasm in the mountain, into which Te Tama-Hoi was buried. The chasm became the volcanic rent of Mount Tarawera.

Ngātoro-i-rangi eventually arrived at Lake Taupō (Taupō-nui-ā-Tia). He climbed Mount Tauhara and looked out across Taupō-nui-ā-Tia to claim the land he saw. Travelling further south, he reached and began to climb the first mountain along with his slave Ngāuruhoe, who had been travelling with him, and named the mountain Tongariro (the name literally meaning 'looking south'), whereupon the two were overcome by a blizzard carried by the cold south wind.

Near death, Ngātoro-i-rangi called back to his two sisters, Kuiwai and Haungaroa, who had also come from Hawaiki but remained on White Island (Whakaari), to send him sacred fire that they had brought from Hawaiki. This they did, sending the geothermal fire in the form of two taniwha (powerful spirits) named Te Pupu and Te Hoata, by a subterranean passage to the top of Tongariro. The tracks of these two taniwha formed the line of geothermal fire that extends from the Pacific Ocean and beneath the Taupō Volcanic Zone, and is seen in the many volcanoes and hot-springs extending from Whakaari to Tokaanu and up to the Tongariro massif. The fire arrived just in time to save Ngātoro-i-rangi from freezing to death, but Ngāuruhoe was already dead by the time Ngātoro-i-rangi turned to give him the fire. Thus Ngāuruhoe remains frozen as the volcanic cone Mount Ngauruhoe today.

Ngātoro-i-rangi named a large number of places in the Central Plateau of the North Island in order to claim the area on behalf of his descendants, who would eventually return under the mantle of the tribe Ngāti Tūwharetoa. Due to the clouds that swarmed around the mountains Pihanga, Ruapehu, Tongariro, and Ngāuruhoe, the Desert Road side was unknown to Ngātoro-i-rangi at this time, which is why the borderlines of Ngati Tuwharetoa are only one side of Mount Ruapehu, the other side being part of the Whanganui tribal area.

During his journey he left seeds (children). The eldest was a son named Tangihia, who married Murirangawhenua of Te Tini o Kawerau. Descent through this marriage comes down to Tuwharetoa-i-te Aupouri at Kawerau (Waitahanui), as well as Tarawhai at Okataina. A prophecy that the descendants of Ngatoroirangi would claim the lands he stamped was fulfilled by the descendants of Tuwharetoa due to battle with Ngāti Hotu, Ngāti Kurapoto and Ngāti Tama. With the help of Ngāti Tuwharetoa of Kawerau they became the overlords of Taupō.

== Later journeys ==
Ngātoroirangi eventually left the Central North Island and returned to Maketu to conduct the rituals to bring Te Arawa waka to rest, before finally settling at Motiti Island.

However, on account of a curse uttered by his brother-in-law Manaia, Ngātoro-i-rangi led an expedition to Hawaiki, and defeated Manaia in the battle of Ihumoto-motokia. Ngātoro-i-rangi also left a son at Tongareva Island. Ngātoro-i-rangi then returned to New Zealand and fortified Mōtītī Island, where he was attacked by Manaia, who, with all his host, perished when by mighty spells Ngātoro-i-rangi raised a huge storm called Te Aputahi-ā-Pawa.

It is said that as an old man Ngātoro-i-rangi attempted to travel to Kawhia to visit his cousin Hoturoa who had taken command of the Tainui waka, but he never arrived. Many years later his bones were recovered from the Waikato River with his facial tattoo (tāmoko) still identifiable. It is uncertain where his remains were finally buried with both Kawhia and Motiti island being possible sites.

== Mana of Ngāti Tūwharetoa ==
Ngāti Tūwharetoa academic Hemopereki Simon wrote that the mana in particular the mana whenua and mana motuhake of Ngāti Tūwharetoa is derived from the arrival of Ngātoro-i-rangi and that this is best demonstrated culturally through Puhiwahine's moteatea, He waiata aroha mo Te Toko or more commonly known as "Ka Eke ki Wairaka."

The following lines from the moteatea relate to the history of Ngātoro-i-rangi.

Kāti au ka hoki ki taku whenua tupu
Ki te wai koropupū i heria mai nei
I Hawaiki rā anō e Ngātoroirangi
E ōna tuāhine Te Hoata, Te Pupū
E hū rā i Tongariro, ka mahana i taku kiri.

== Bibliography ==
- R.D. Craig, Dictionary of Polynesian Mythology (Greenwood Press: New York, 1989), p185.
- John TH Grace, Tuwharetoa: A history of the Māori People of the Taupo District (Wellington: Reed, 1959).
- Simon, Hemopereki, "Te Arewhana Kei Roto i Te Rūma: An Indigenous Neo-Disputatio on Settler Society, Nullifying Te Tiriti, ‘Natural Resources’ and Our Collective Future in Aotearoa New Zealand," Te Kaharoa, 9 (1), https://www.tekaharoa.com/index.php/tekaharoa/article/view/6/4
- E.R. Tregear, Maori-Polynesian Comparative Dictionary (Lyon and Blair: Lambton Quay 1891), pp280–281.
- Waitangi Tribunal, He Maunga Rongo: Report on the Central North Island Claims Vol.4, (Legislation Direct: Wellington, 2008), p1282, pp1468–1469.
- Mataara Wall, Bruce Stirling and Lennie Johns, Ngati Tutemohuta: A Maori History of North East Taupo (Pakira Publishing: Taupo, 2009).
