= 2021 Birthday Honours (New Zealand) =

Awards list for New Zealand

2021 Queen's Birthday Honours
- Previous: 2021 New Year Honours; Next: 2021 Special Honours
- Type: New Zealand royal honours: New Zealand Order of Merit; Queen's Service Order; Queen's Service Medal; Distinguished Service Decoration
- Date: 7 June 2021
- Country: New Zealand
- Total recipients: 170

The 2021 Queen's Birthday Honours in New Zealand, celebrating the official birthday of Queen Elizabeth II, were appointments made by the Queen in her right as Queen of New Zealand, on the advice of the New Zealand government, to various orders and honours to reward and highlight good works by New Zealanders. They were announced on 7 June 2021.

The recipients of honours are listed here as they were styled before their new honour.

== New Zealand Order of Merit ==
=== Dame Companion (DNZM) ===
- Professor Carolyn Waugh Burns CBE – of Roslyn. For services to ecological research.
- Judith Anne Kilpatrick CNZM – of Kumeū. For services to nursing education.
- Hinewehi Mohi MNZM – of Havelock North. For services to Māori, music and television.
- Ruia Mereana Morrison MBE – of Rotorua. For services to tennis.
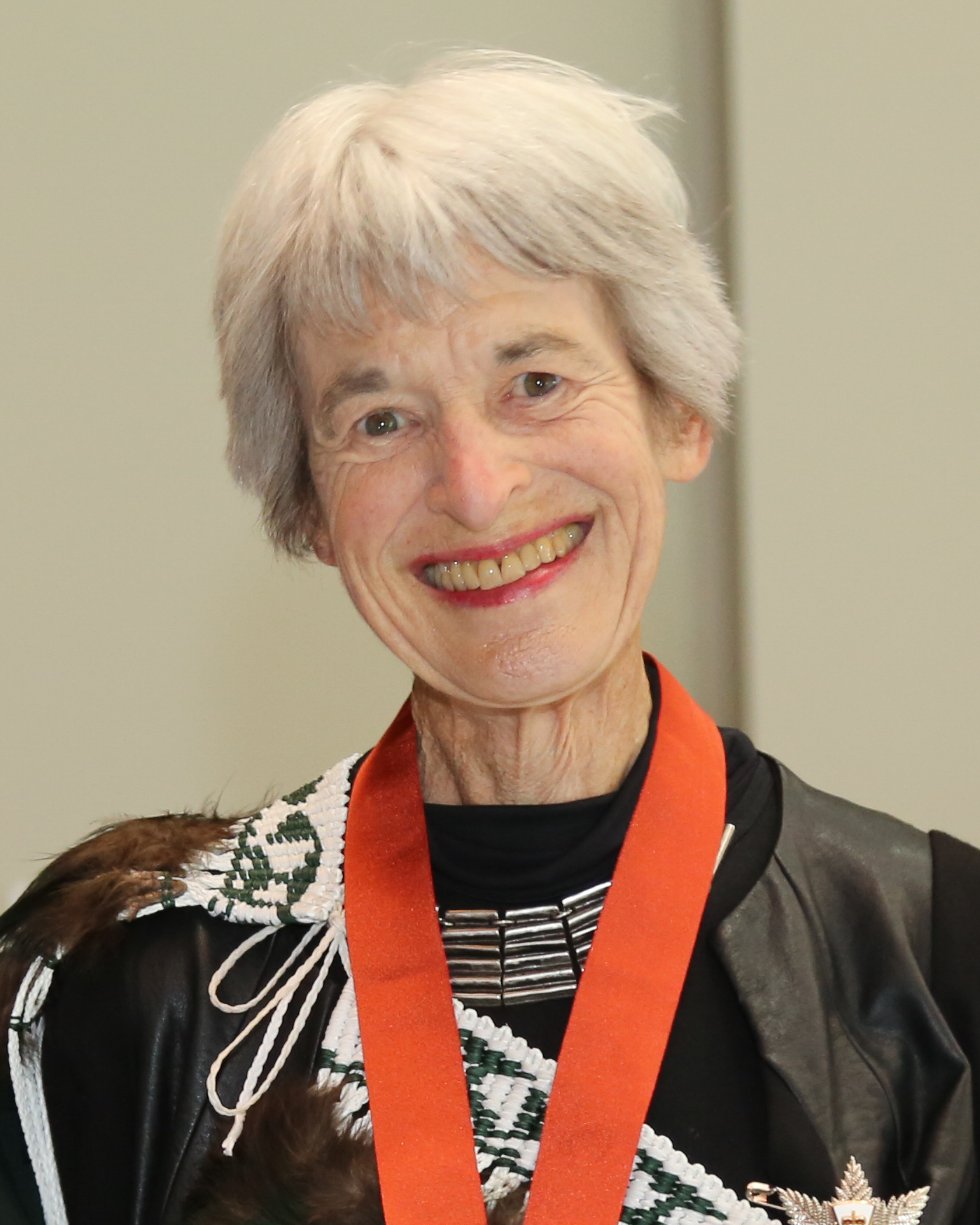
Dame Carolyn Burns

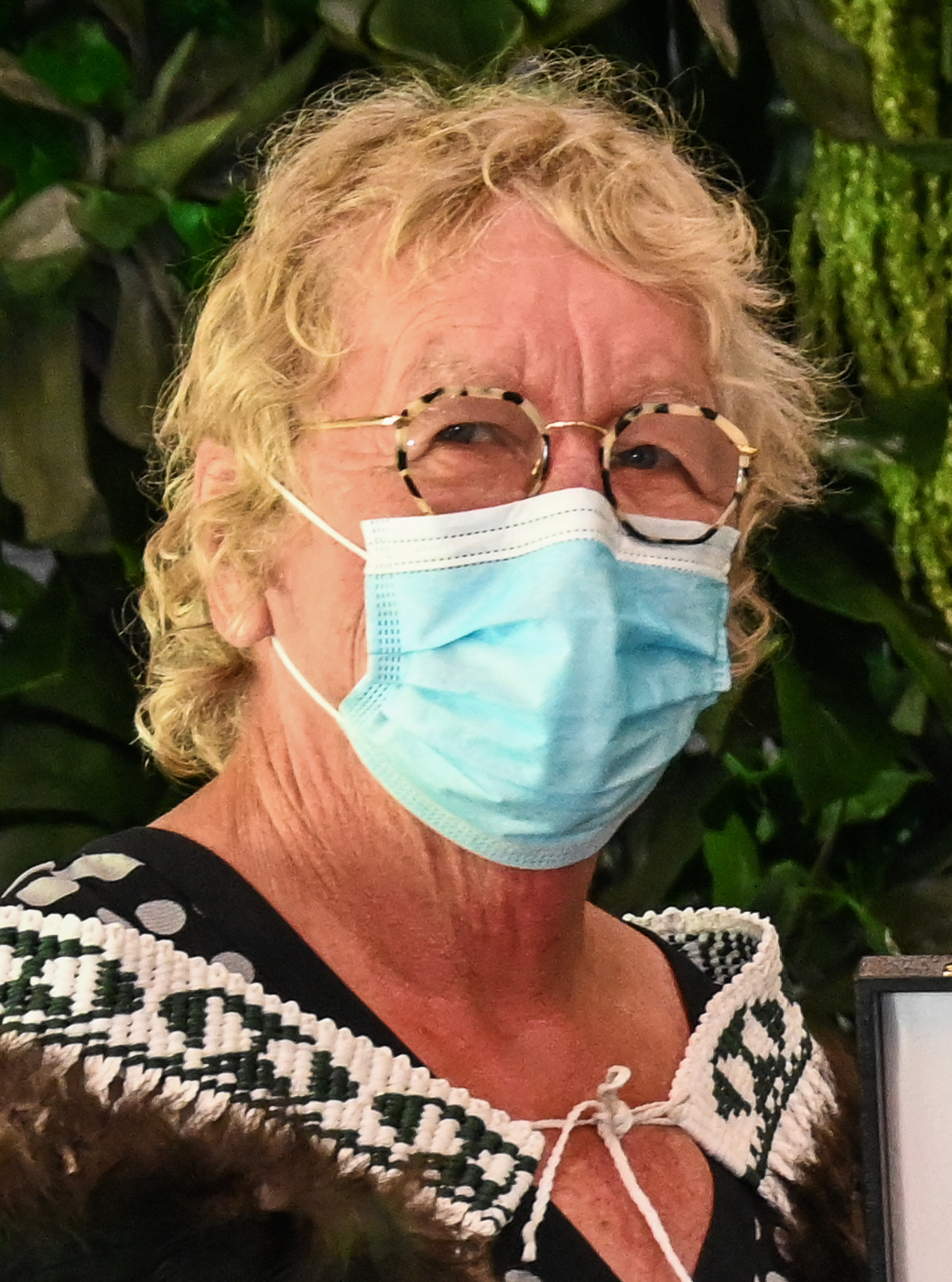
Dame Judy Kilpatrick

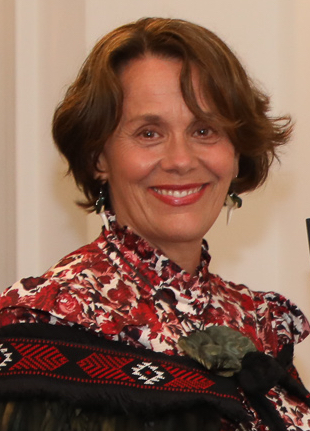
Dame Hinewehi Mohi

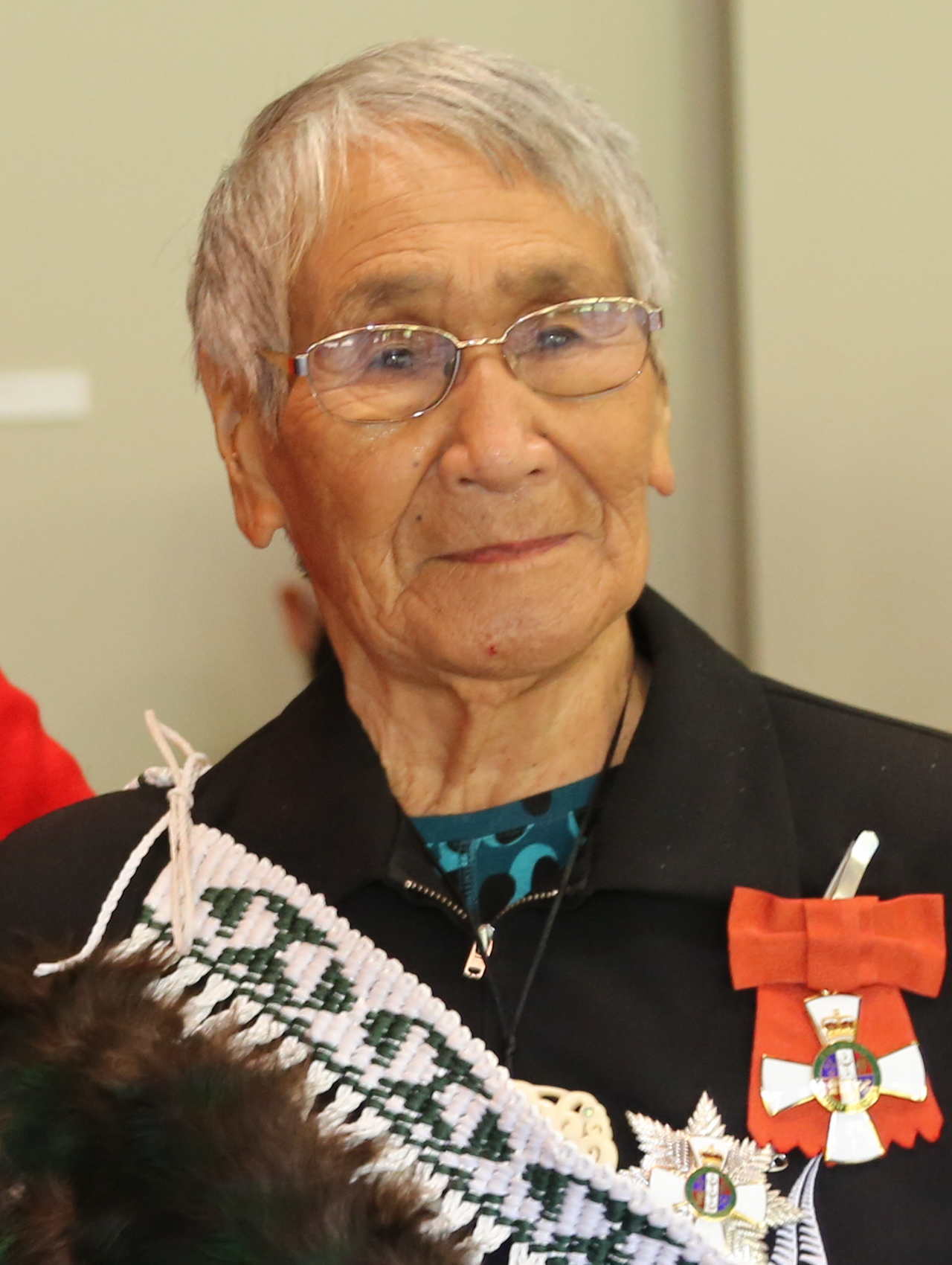
Dame Ruia Morrison

=== Knight Companion (KNZM) ===
- Michael Grenfell Daniell – of Herne Bay. For services to business, healthcare and governance.
- Distinguished Professor William Alexander Denny ONZM – of Pakuranga. For services to medical research.
- Wayne Thomas Shelford MBE – of Red Beach. For services to rugby and the community.
- Grahame Charles Sydney ONZM – of Oturehua. For services to art.
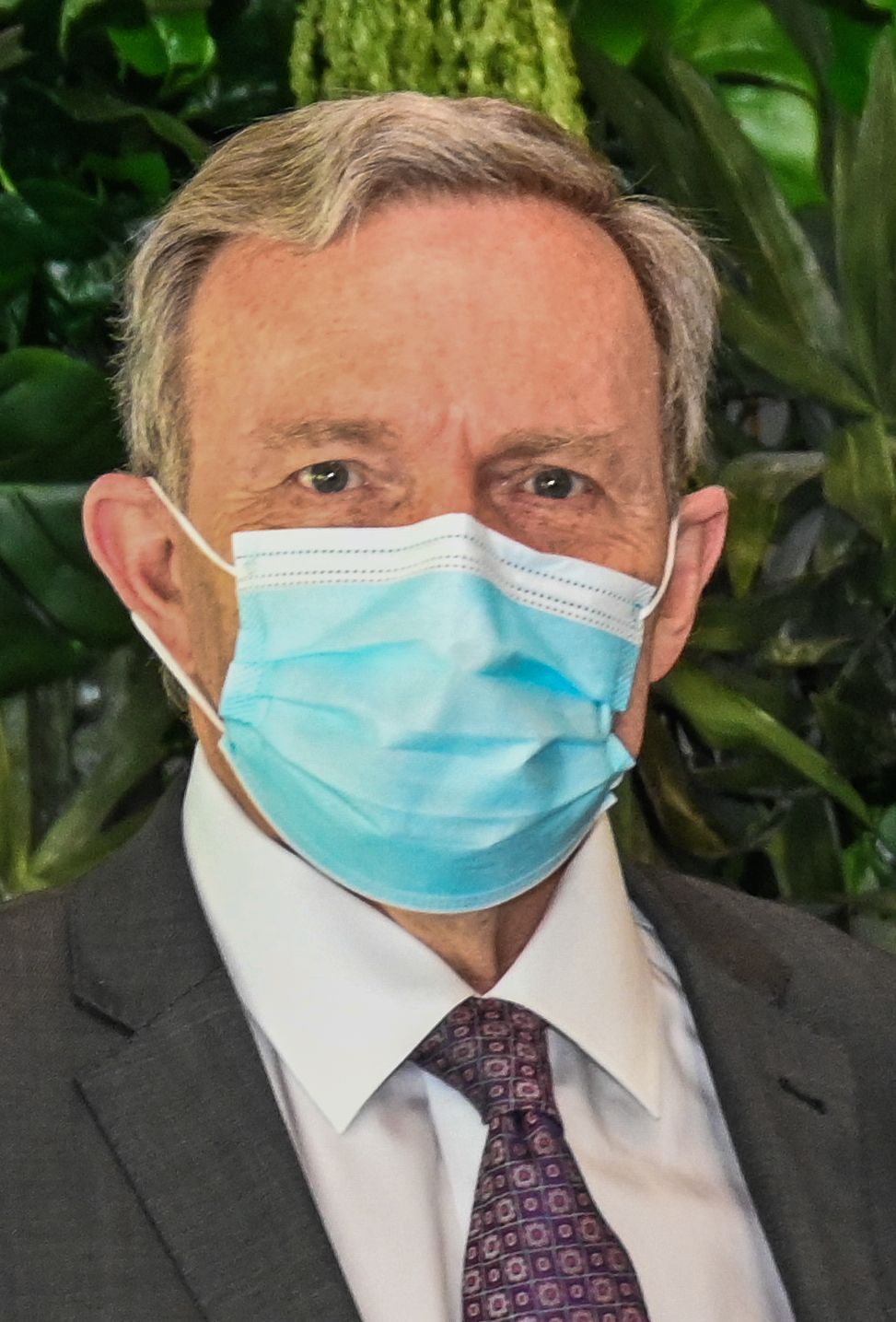
Sir Michael Daniell

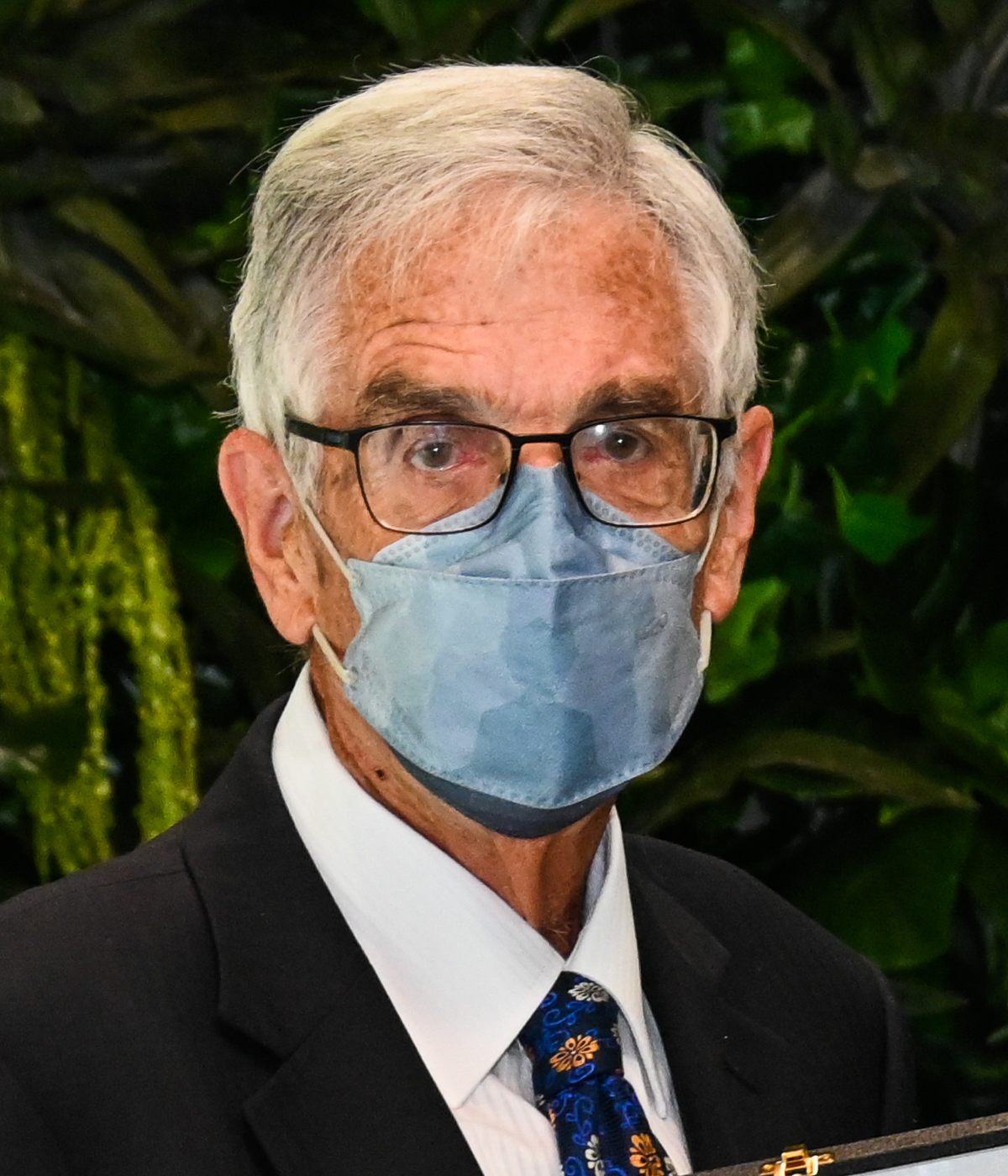
Sir Bill Denny

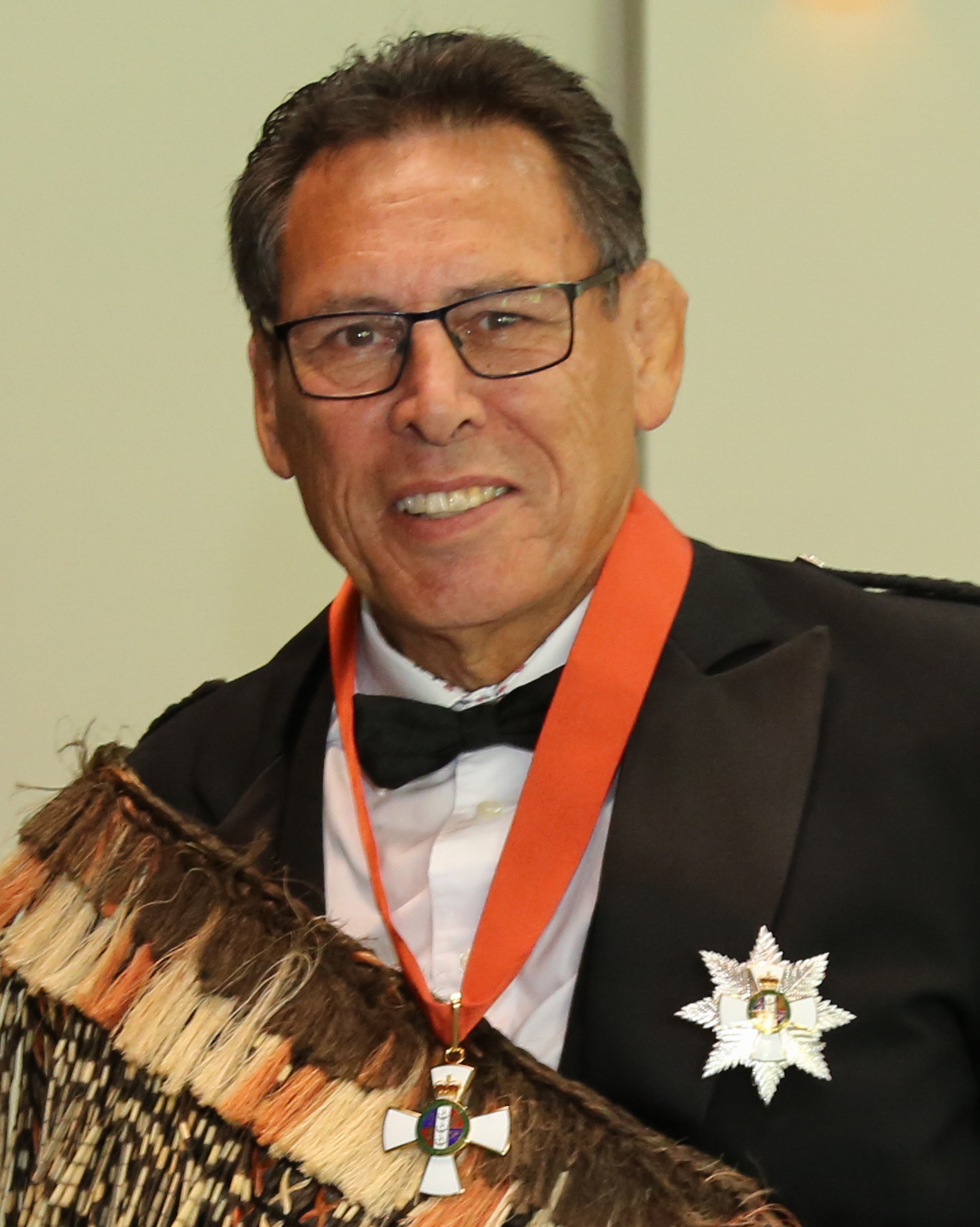
Sir Wayne Shelford

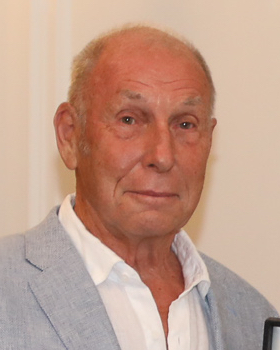
Sir Grahame Sydney

=== Companion (CNZM) ===
- Dr Evelyn Imelda Coxon – of Auckland. For services to Pacific and tertiary education.
- David Charles Cull – of Dunedin. For services to local government. (Note: Deceased. Her Majesty's approval of this appointment took effect on 26 April 2021, before the date of death.)
- Robert Charles Francis QSO MBE JP – of Masterton. For services to the community and conservation.
- Professor Angus Hikairo Macfarlane – of Ilam. For services to education, psychology and Māori.
- Dr Kevin Raymond Marshall – of Seatoun. For services to food science and technology.
- Harry Haerengarangi Mikaere – of Coromandel. For services to the aquaculture industry and Māori.
- John Stewart Ombler QSO – of Wānaka. For services to the public service.
- Professor Suzanne Carolyn Purdy – of Greenlane. For services to audiology and communication science.
- Professor Emeritus David Eric Richmond – of Mount Wellington. For services to health and education.
- Dr Robert Simon Hearn Rowley – of Mount Eden. For services to paediatric and neonatal care.
- Dr Maxwell Gilbert Shepherd JP – of Wānaka. For services to biotechnology and business.
- John Webster Te Kapene Thatcher – of Tauranga. For services to Māori and education.
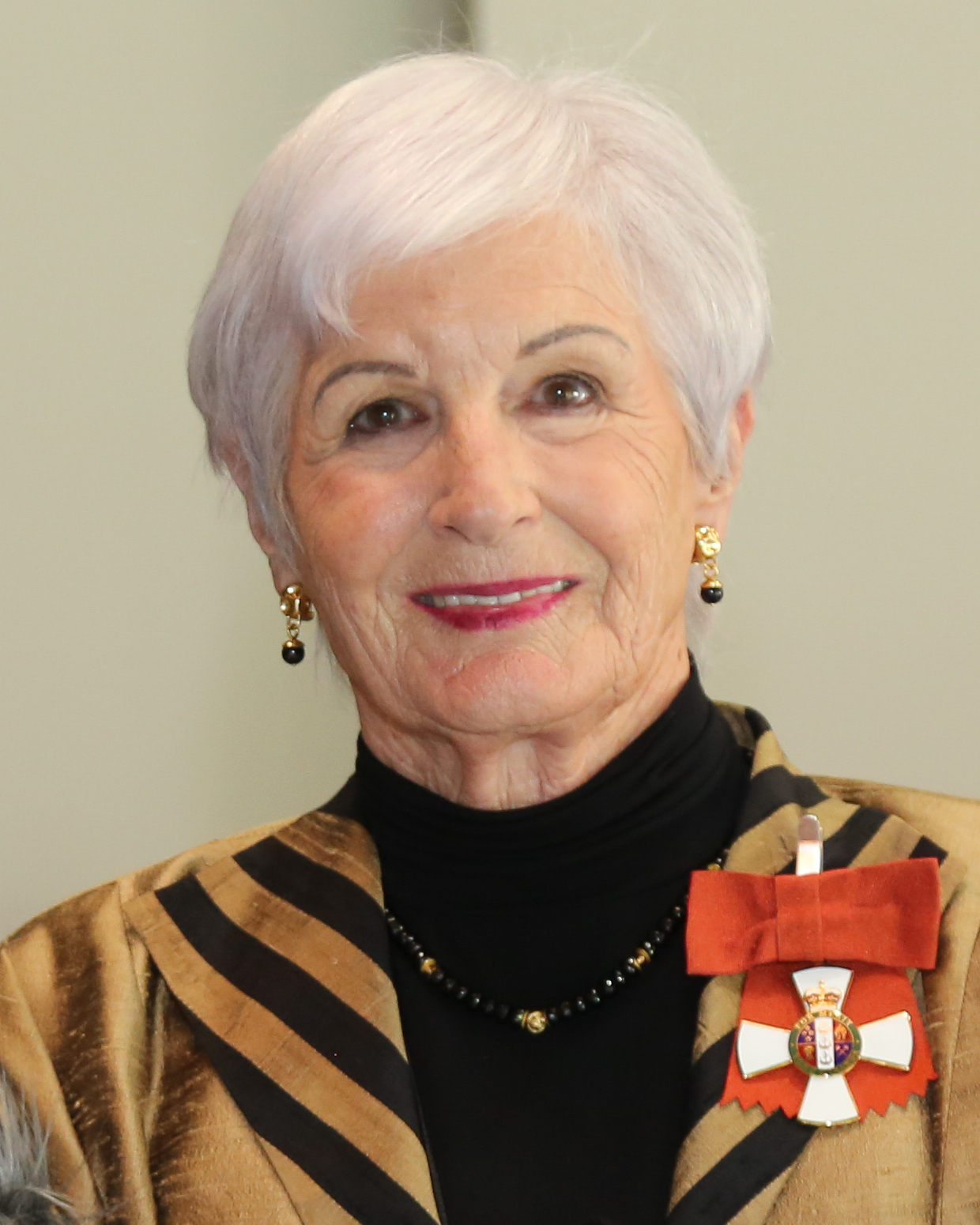
Eve Coxon

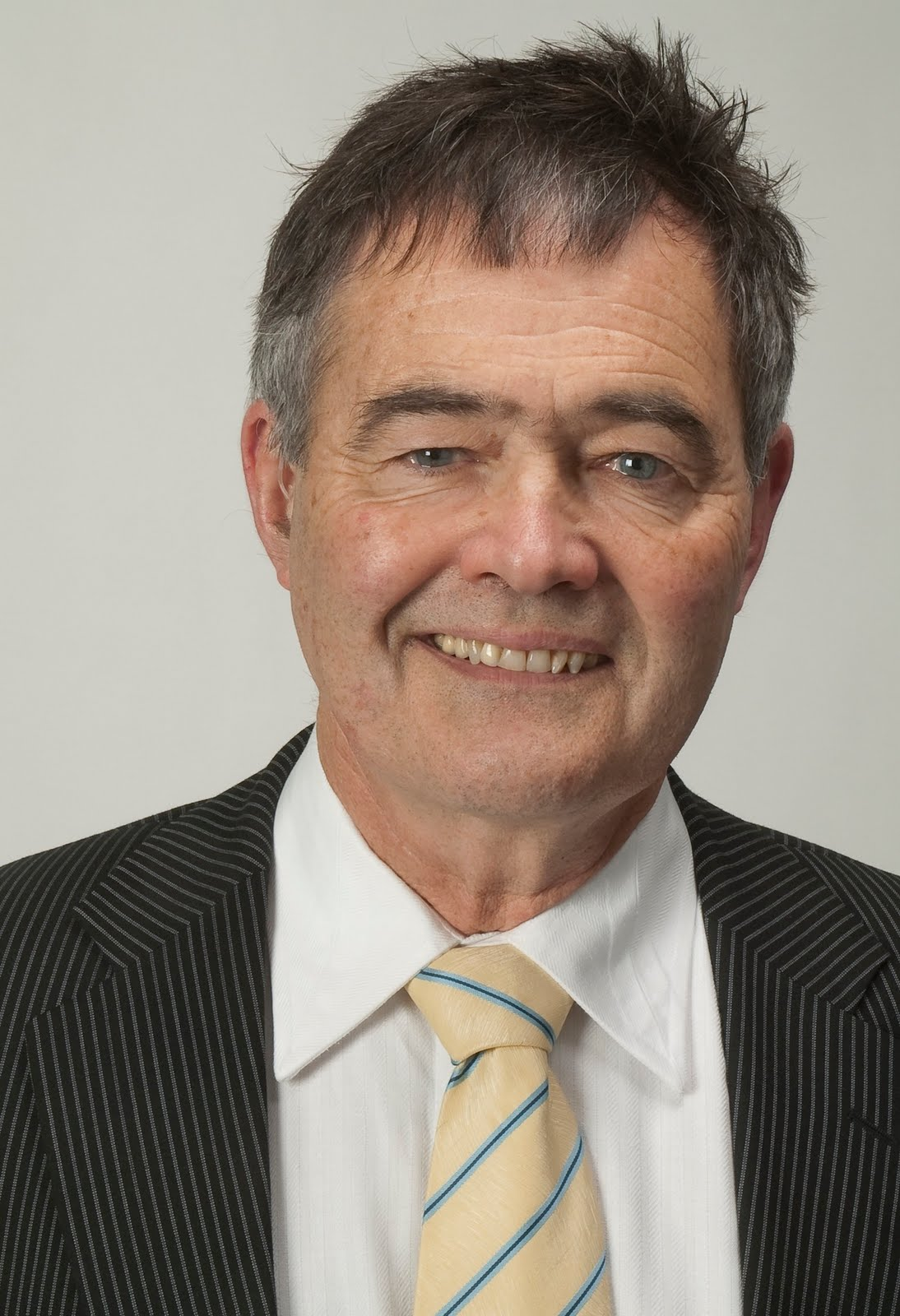
Dave Cull

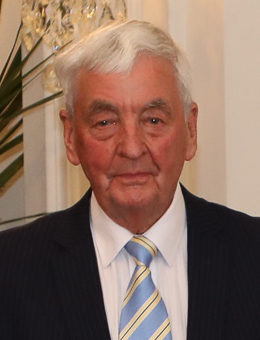
Bob Francis

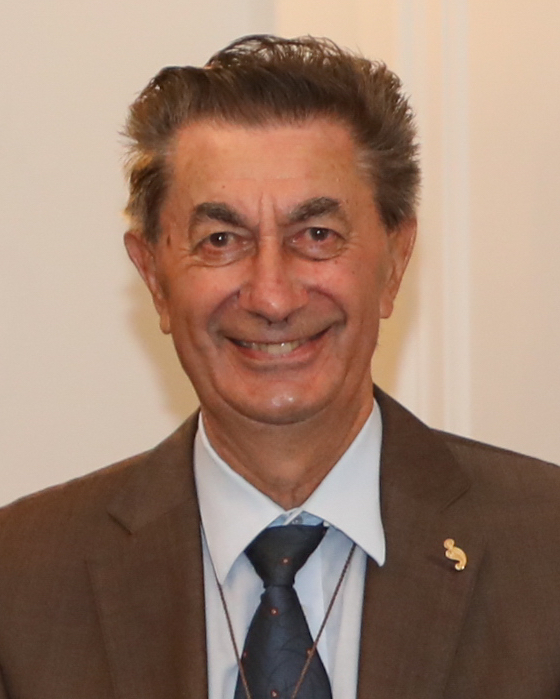
Angus Macfarlane

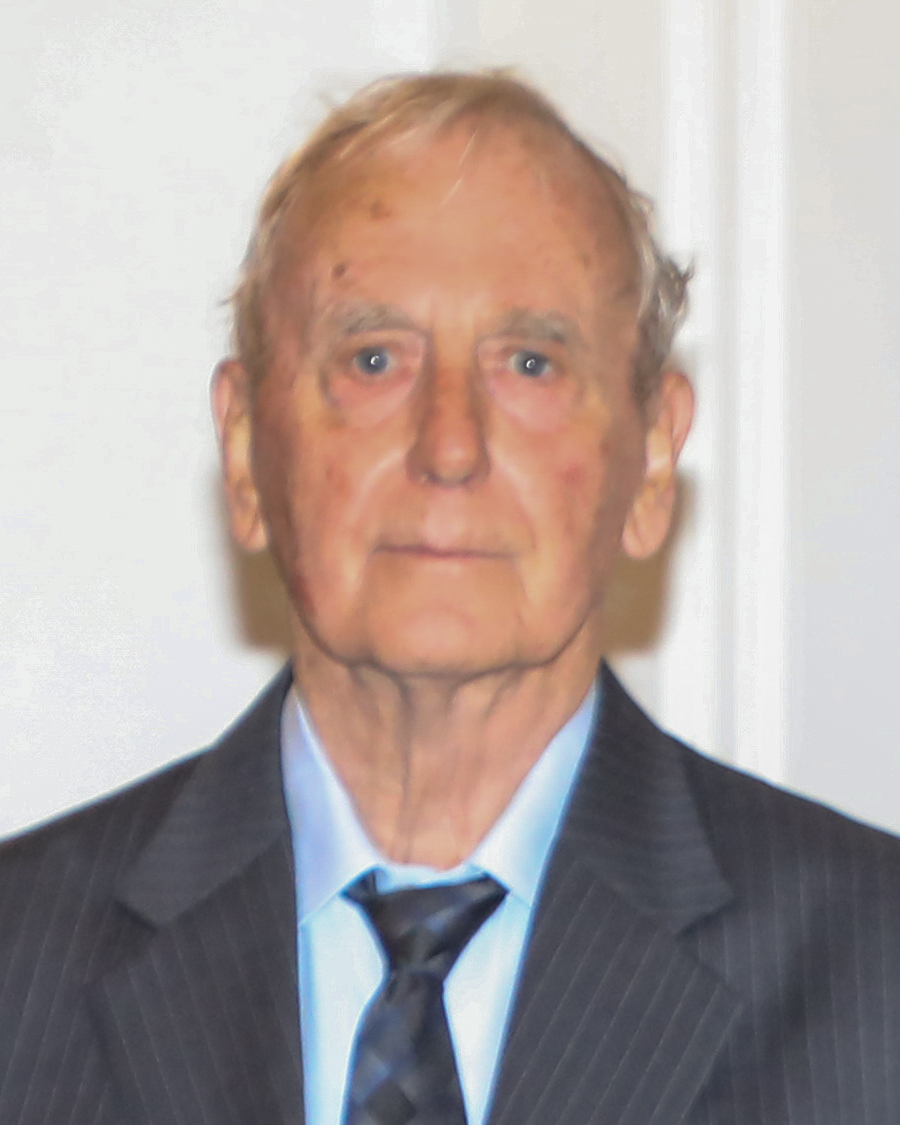
Kevin Marshall

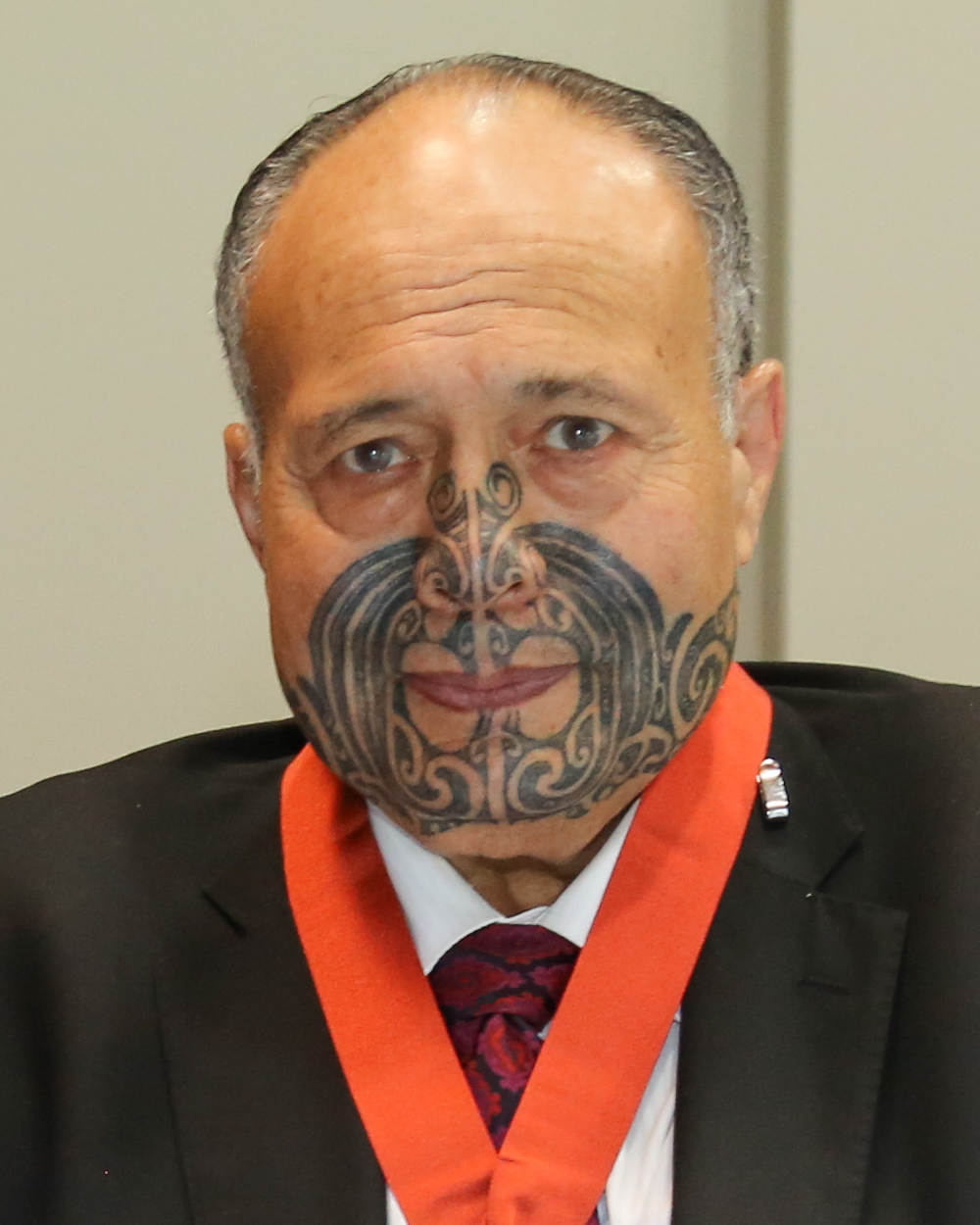
Harry Mikaere

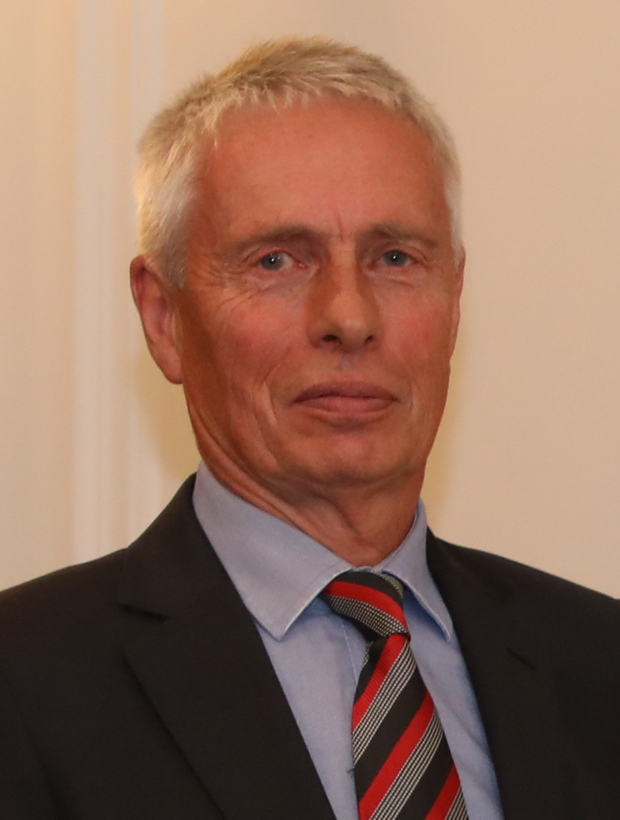
John Ombler

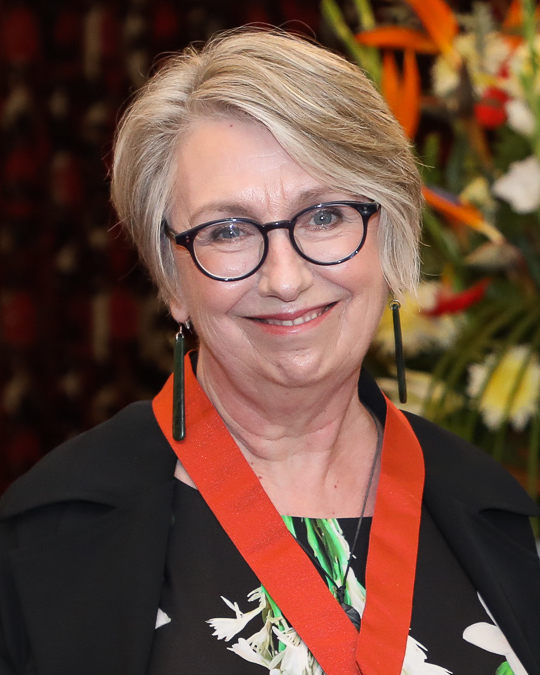
Suzanne Purdy

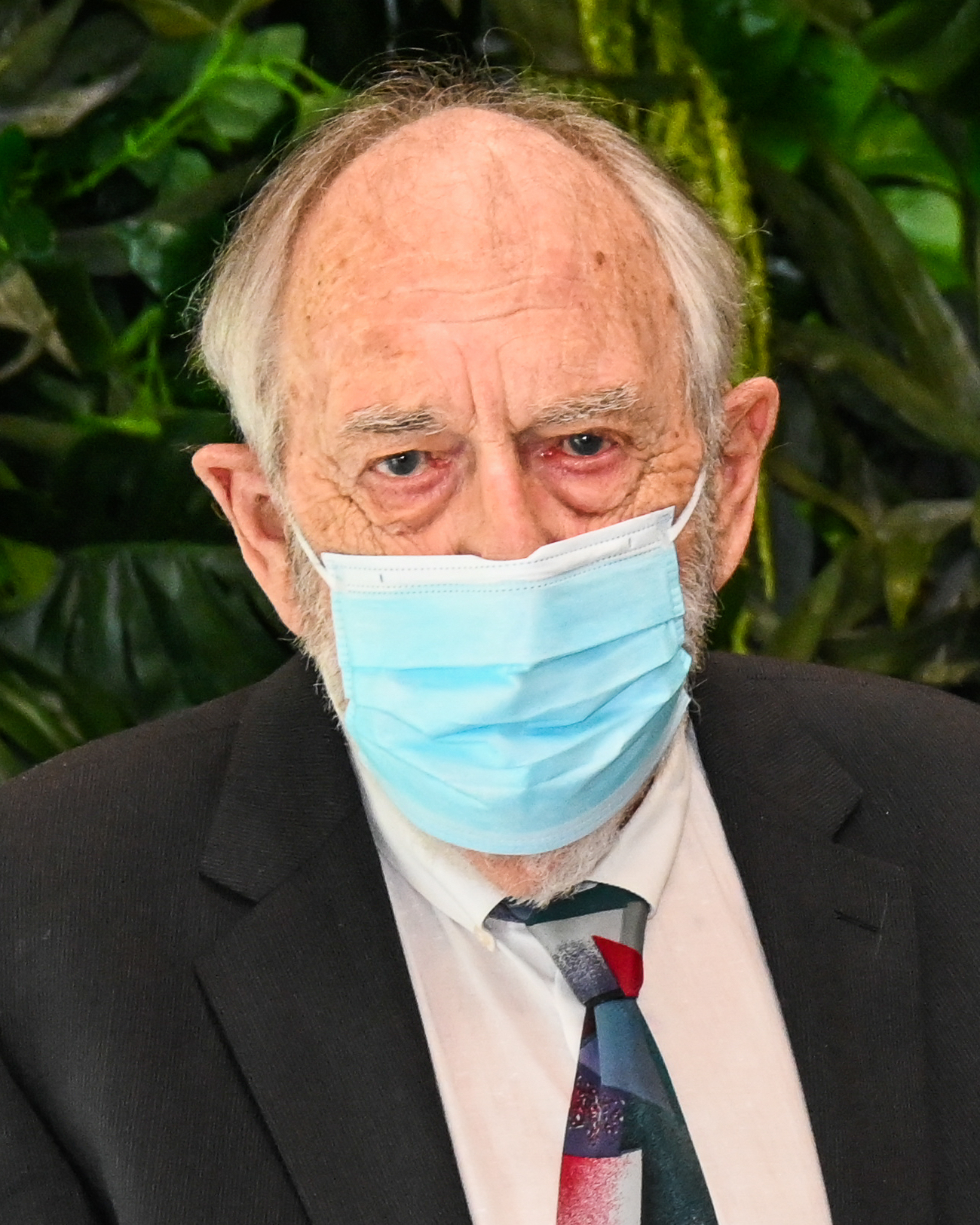
David Richmond

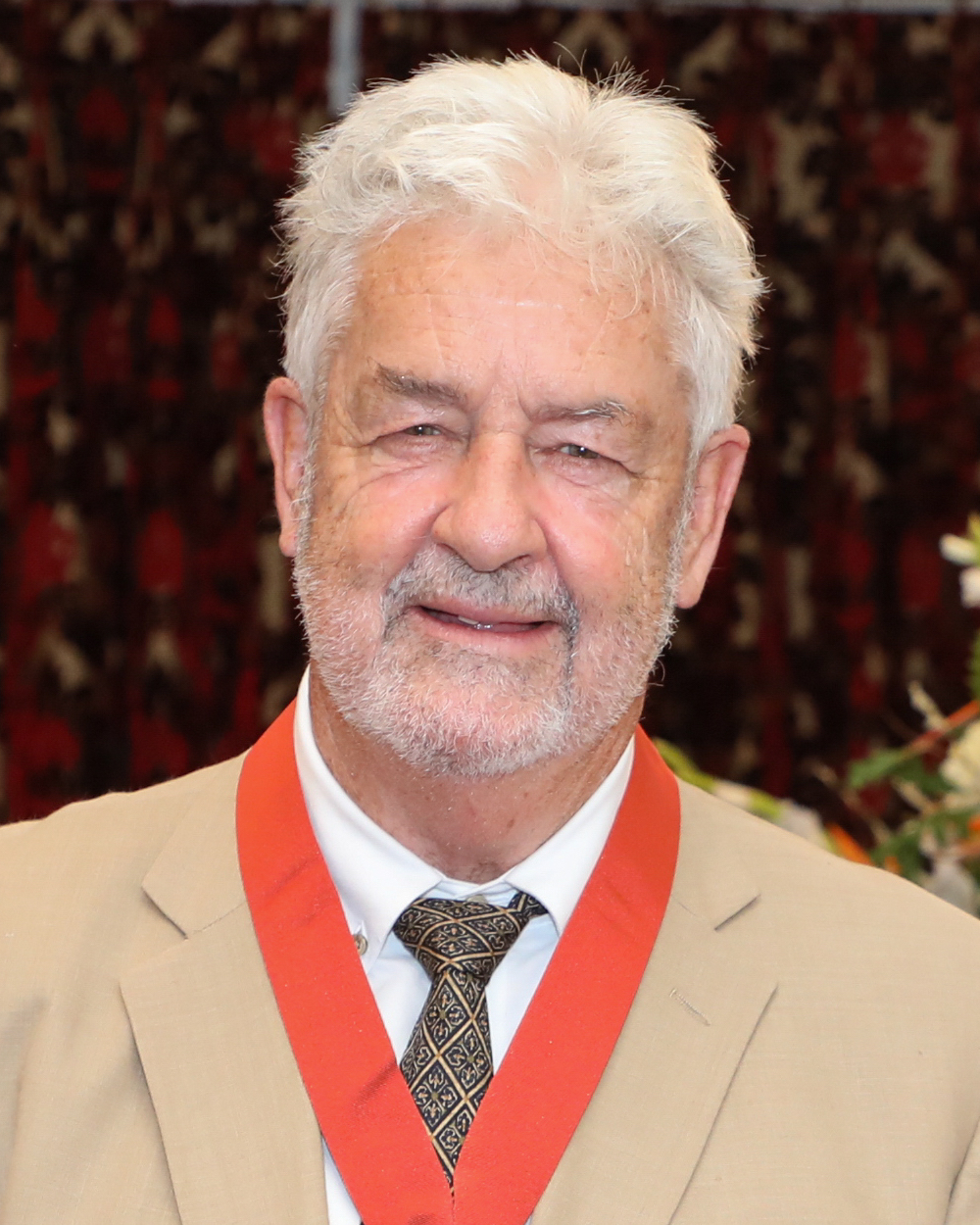
Simon Rowley

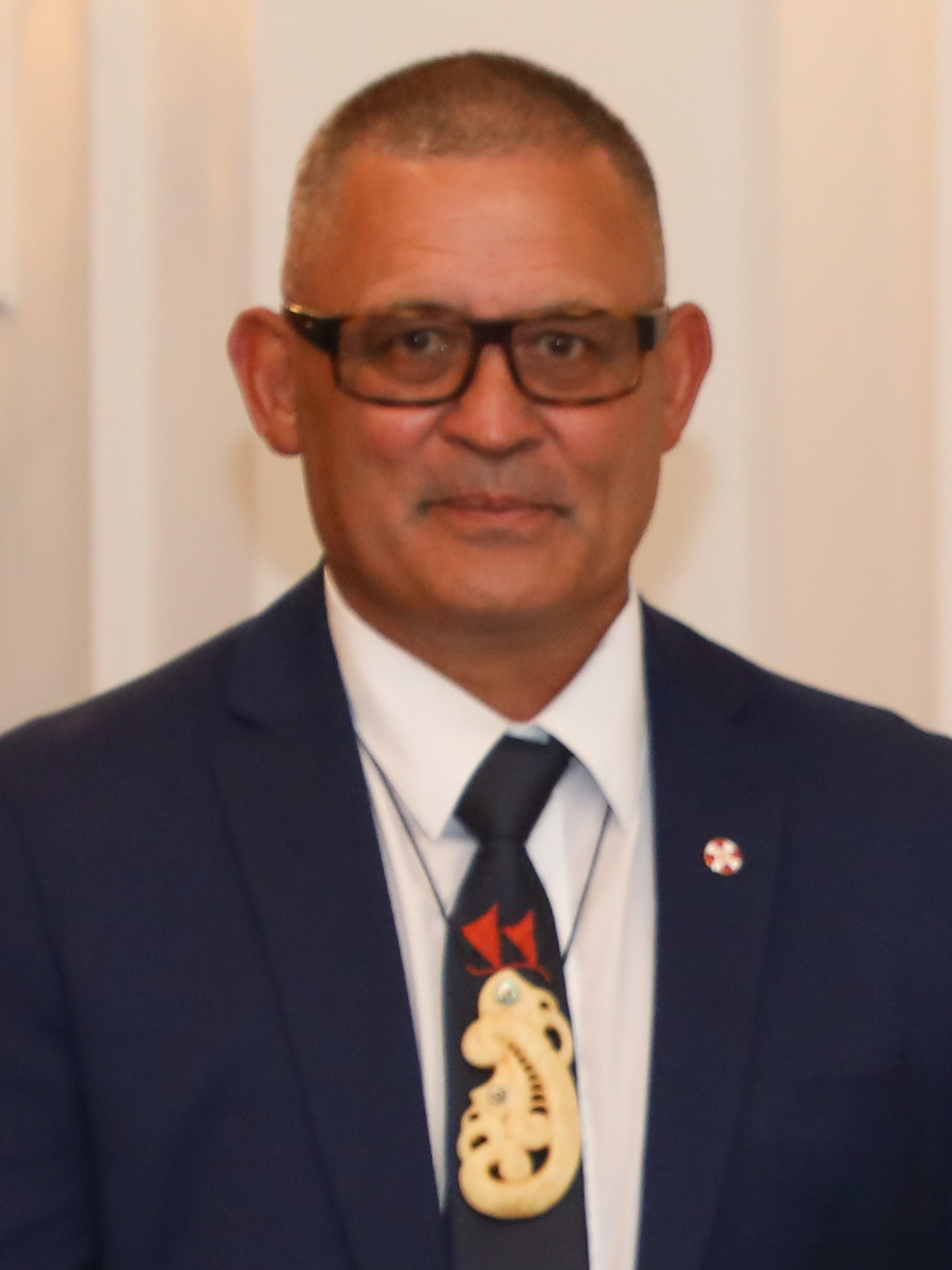
Jack Thatcher

=== Officer (ONZM) ===
- Murray Ian Bain – of Kerikeri. For services to tertiary education and digital learning.
- Margaret Mary Baker – of Hastings. For services to Special Olympics.
- Carol Ann Beaumont – of Epsom. For services to the union movement and women's rights.
- David Ross Black – of Wānaka. For services to health.
- James Anthony Brownlie – of Wairoa. For services to agriculture and education.
- Jamie Bull – of Ōtaki Beach. For services to the performing arts and the community.
- Hugh Jason Paul Canard – of Spreydon. For services to conservation and paddle sports.
- Garry Keith Carnachan – of New Plymouth. For services to secondary school sport.
- Margaret Agnes Chapman – of Geraldine. For services to rural women and rural communities.
- Reverend Iliafi Talotusitusi Esera – of Whanganui. For services to the Samoan community and Christian ministry.
- Fiona Mary Gower – of Tuakau. For services to rural women and governance.
- Dr Anne Denise Guy – of Karori. For services to infant mental health.
- Susan Jean Hassall JP – of Cambridge. For services to education.
- Anne Lynette Hawker QSM – of Broadmeadows. For services to people with disabilities.
- Professor Emerita Paula Elizabeth Jameson – of Fendalton. For services to plant science.
- Esther Rata Jessop QSM – of London. For services to Māori and to New Zealand–British relations.
- Takutai Moana Natasha Kemp – of Papakura. For services to street dance and youth.
- Robert Henry Ludbrook – of Hillsborough. For services to family law and children's rights.
- Mary Joan McFarlane – of St Clair. For services to swimming.
- Dr Benjamin Frank Pittman – of Hikurangi. For services to Māori and art.
- Fiona Jocelyn Riddell – of Kingsland. For services to cardiac physiology.
- Dr Linda Janet Robertson – of St Clair. For services to occupational therapy and seniors.
- Itamua Muaiao'omalo Mataiva Dorothy Robertson – of New Plymouth. For services to women, youth and the Pacific community.
- Riccardo Michele Salizzo – of New Jersey, United States. For services to sports media.
- Noma Jeanne Shepherd MNZM – of Kawakawa. For services to the community.
- Professor Harold John Simpson – of Fendalton. For services to art education.
- Darien Ruth Takle – of Mount Eden. For services to the performing arts.
- Gwendoline Tepania-Palmer – of Forest Lake. For services to Māori and health.
- Philip Spencer Trusttum – of Christchurch Central City. For services to art.
- Beverley Celia Watson – of Avondale. For services to race relations and youth.
- Bruce William Massy Wills – of Hastings. For services to agriculture and the environment.
- Neil Bernard Woodhams – of Herald Island. For services to people with multiple sclerosis.

Honorary

- Dr Wolfgang Scholz – of Milford. For services to engineering and metals-based industry.
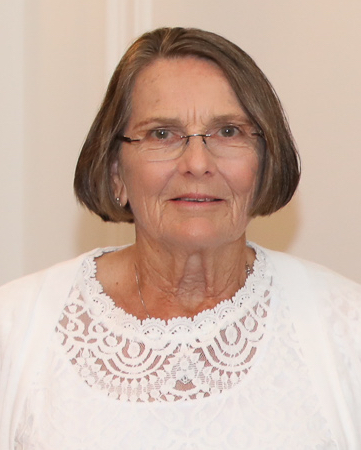
Margaret Baker

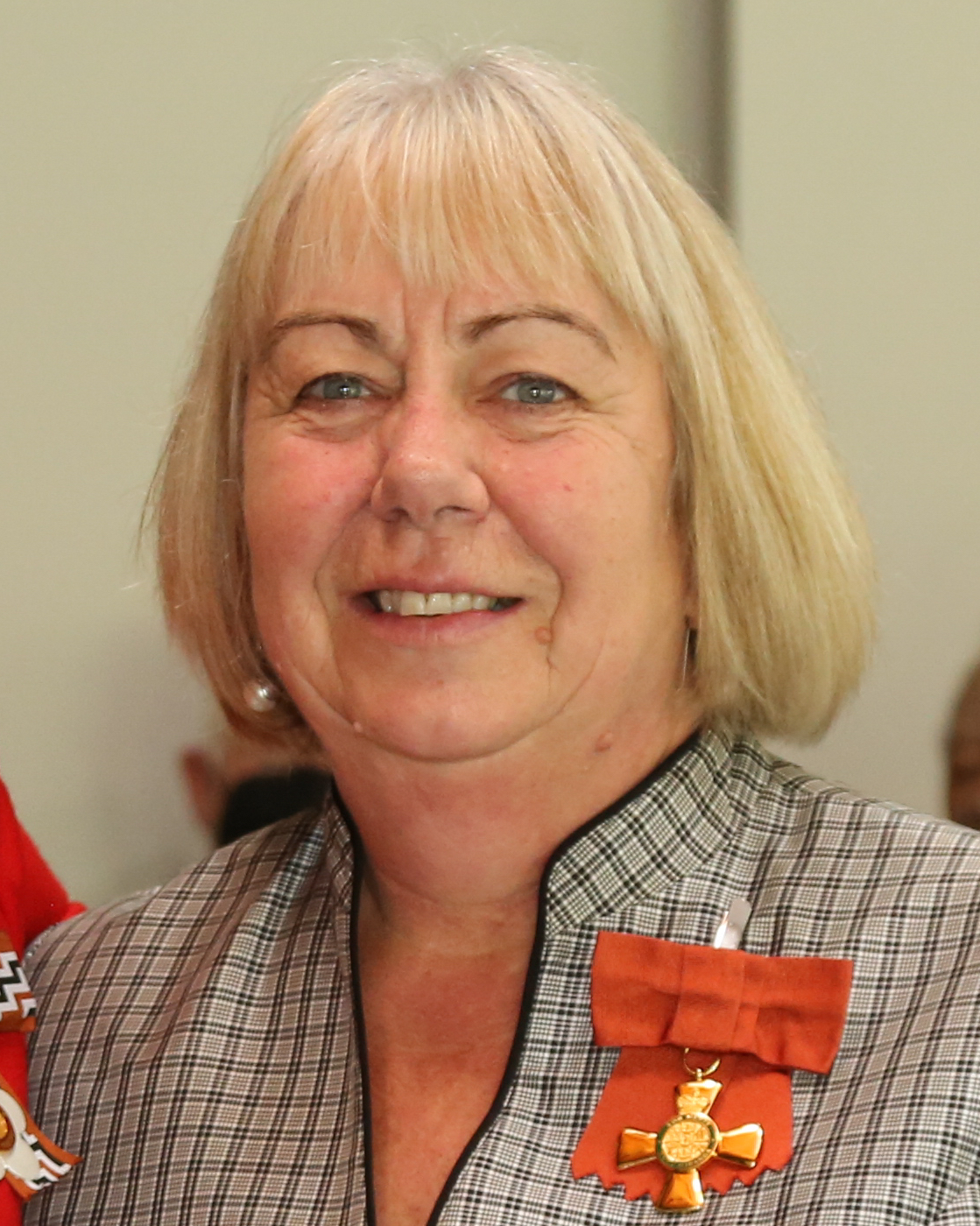
Carol Beaumont

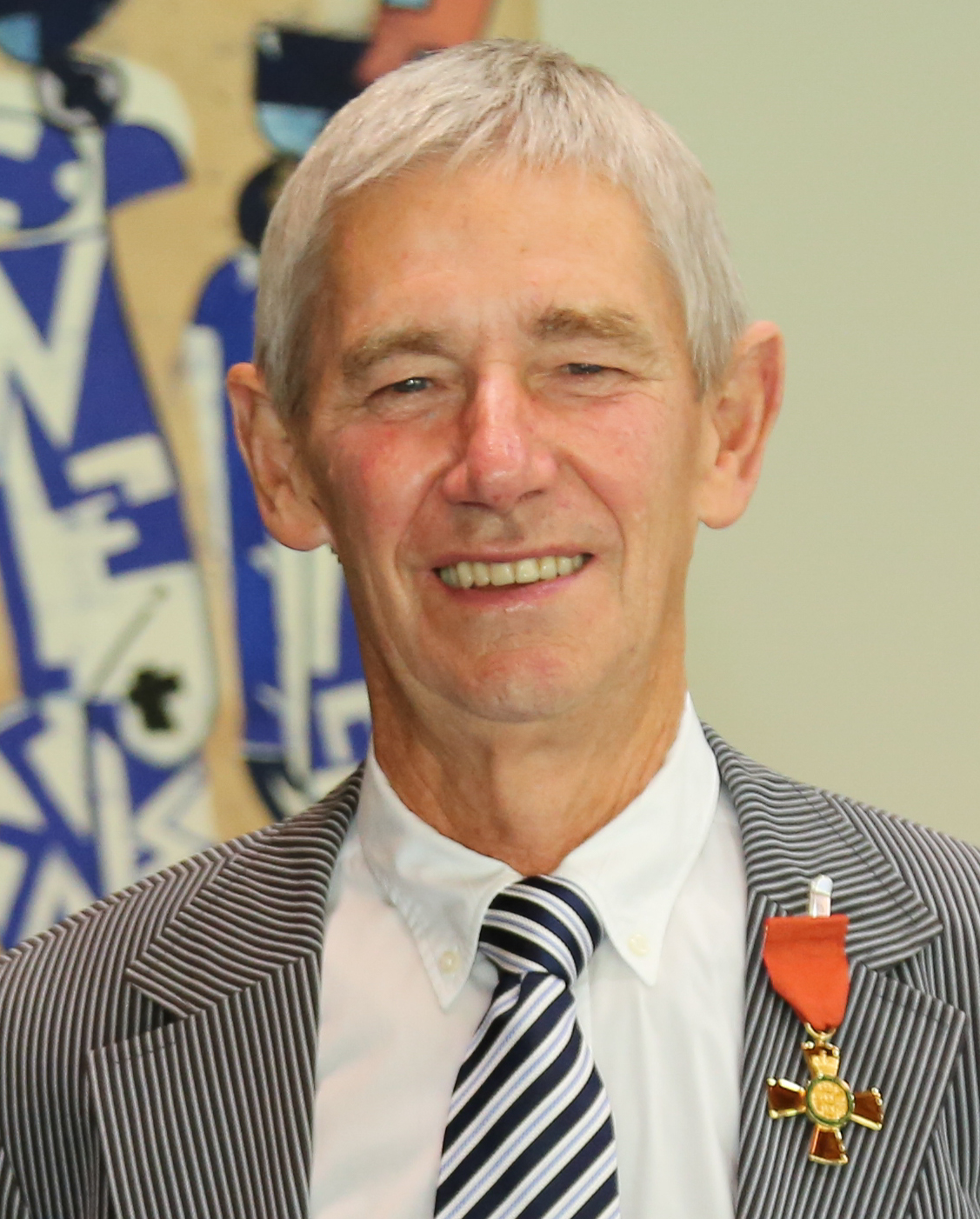
Ross Black

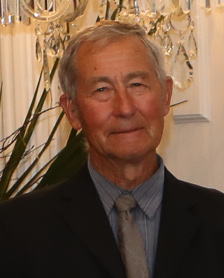
James Brownlie

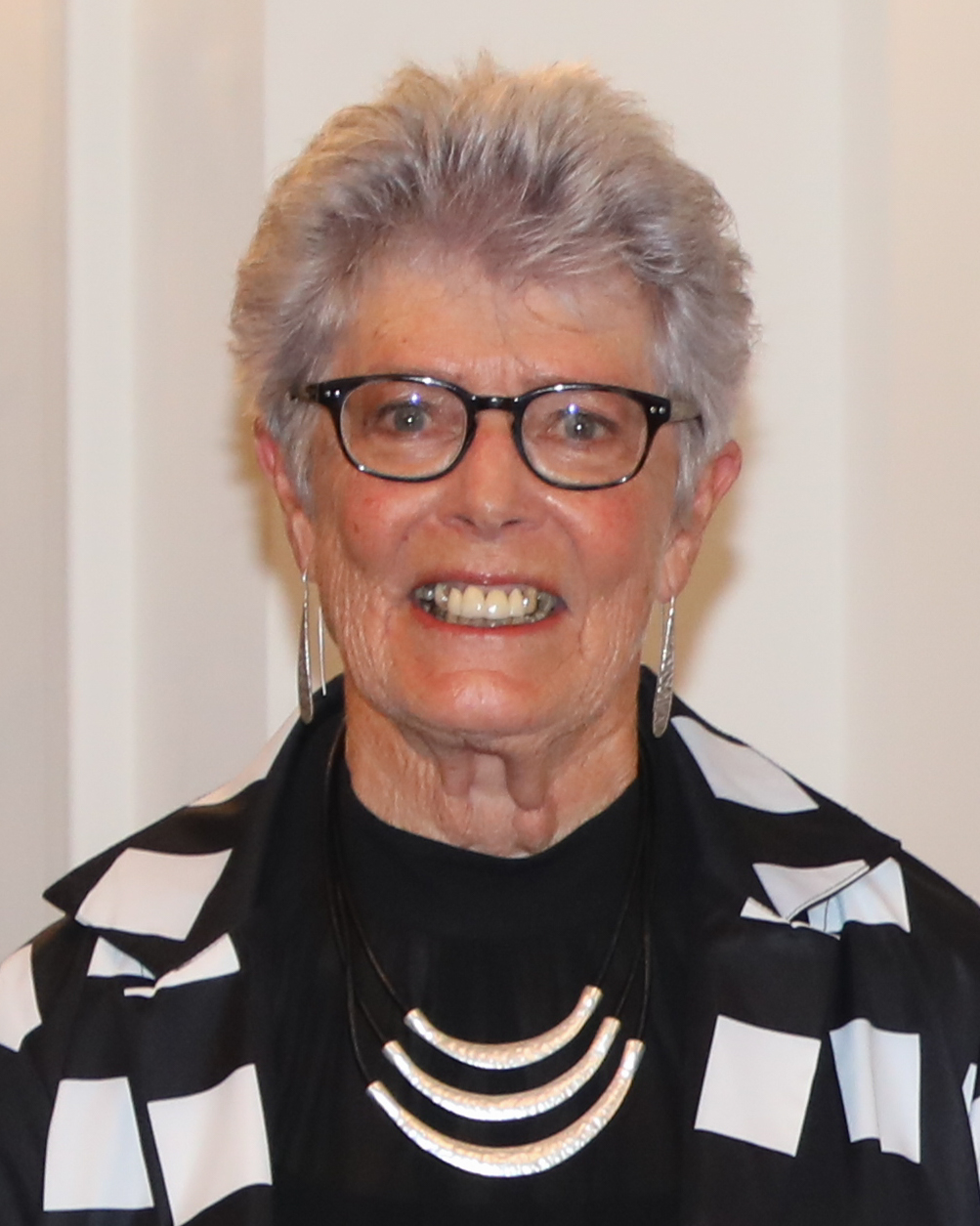
Jamie Bull

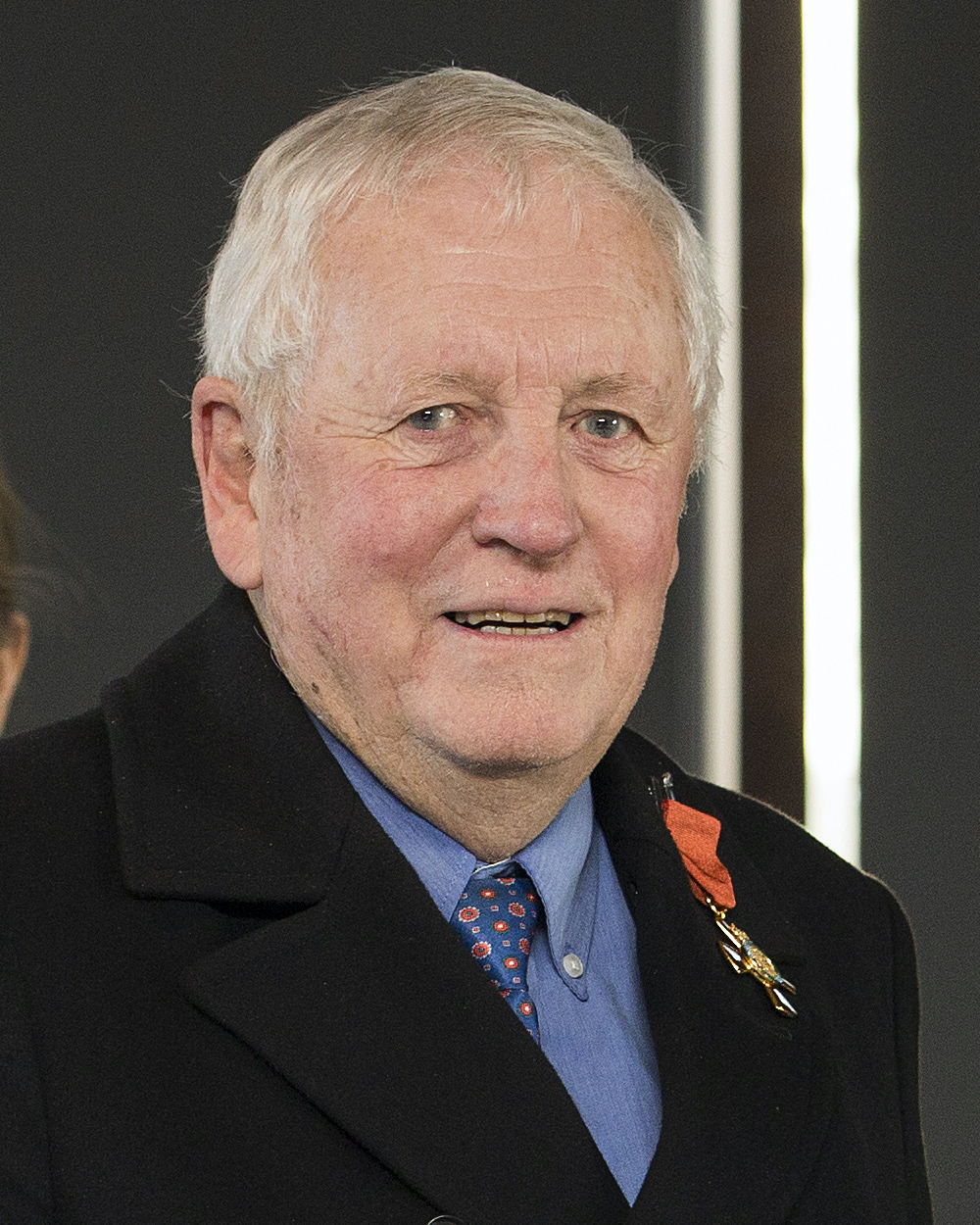
Hugh Canard

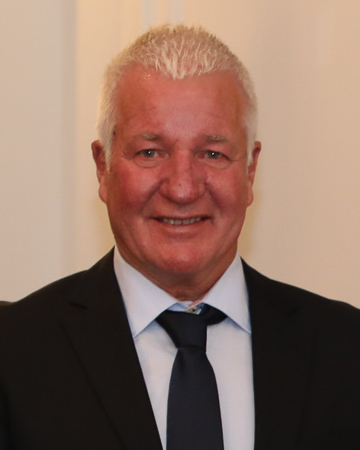
Garry Carnachan

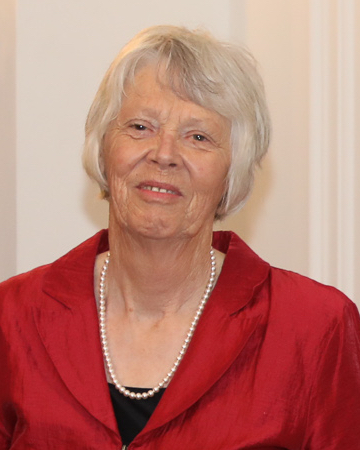
Margaret Chapman

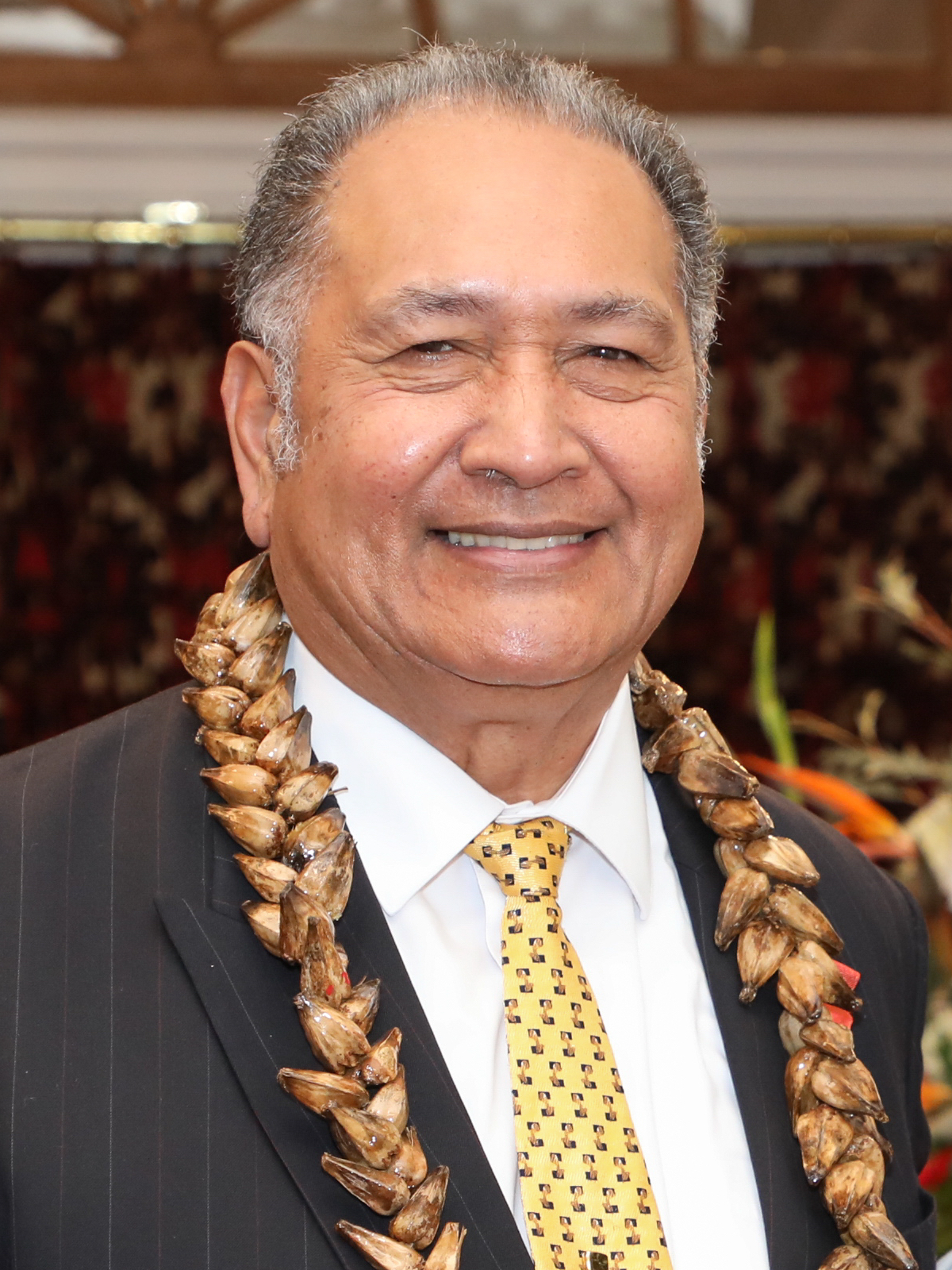
Iliafi Esera

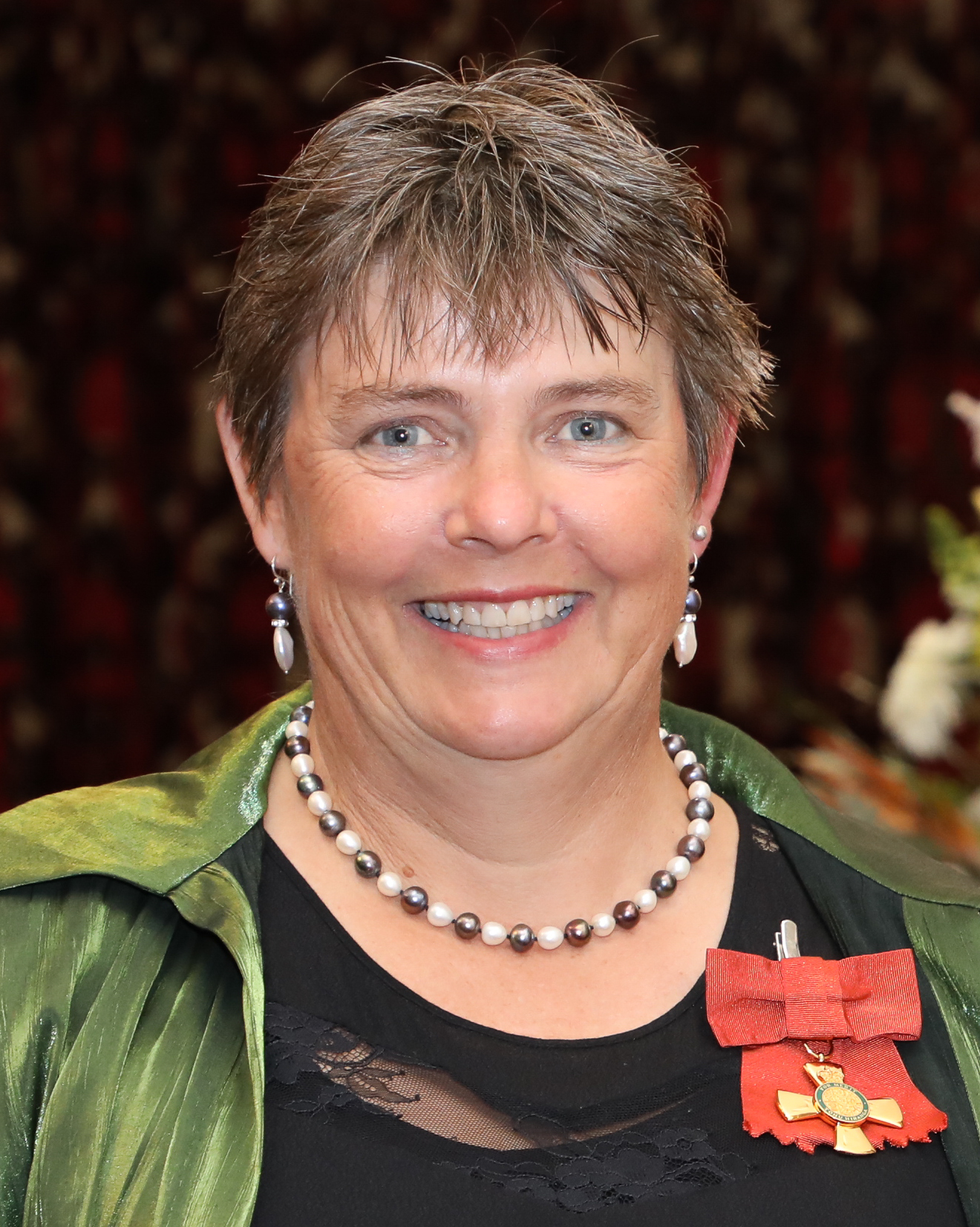
Fiona Gower

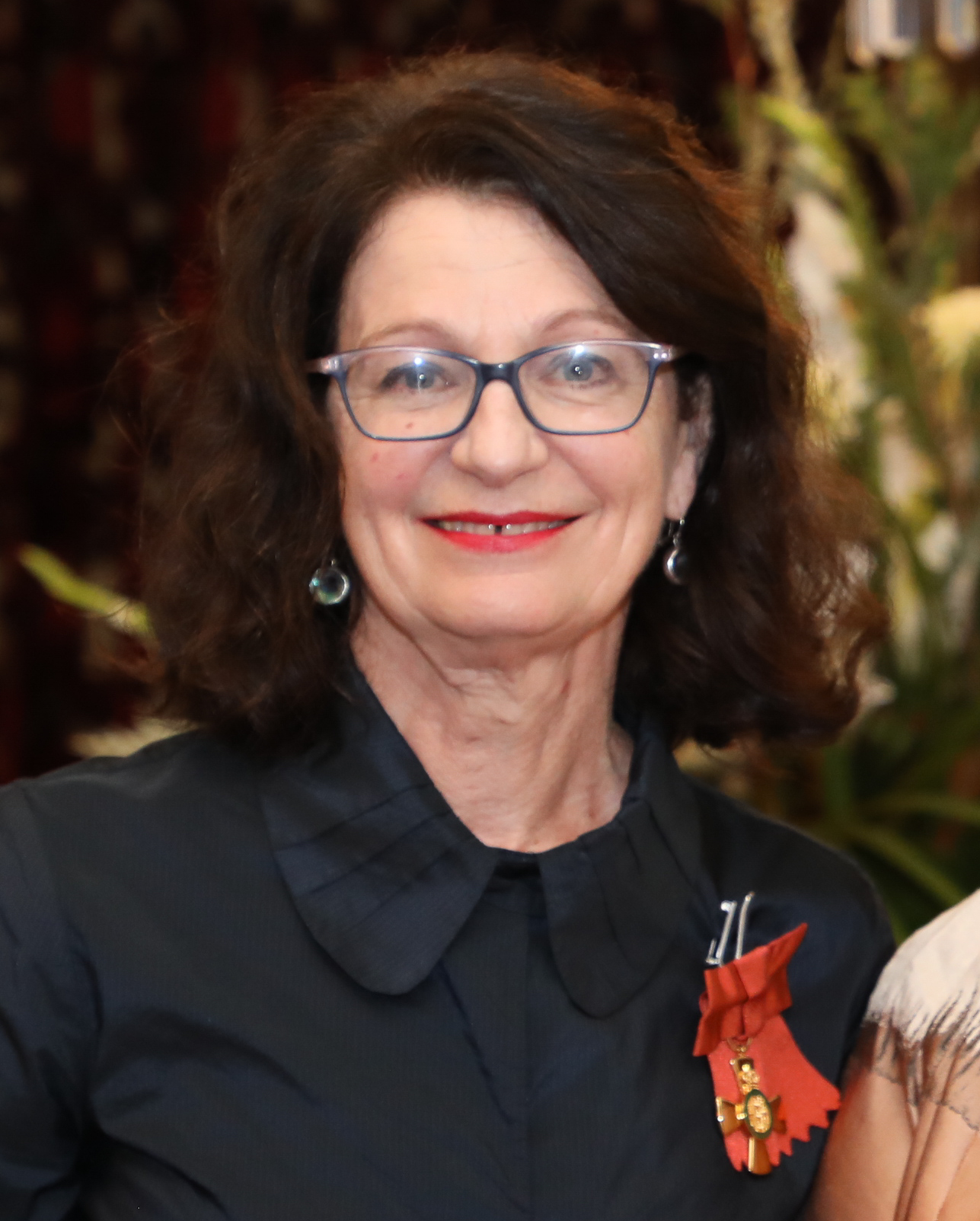
Denise Guy

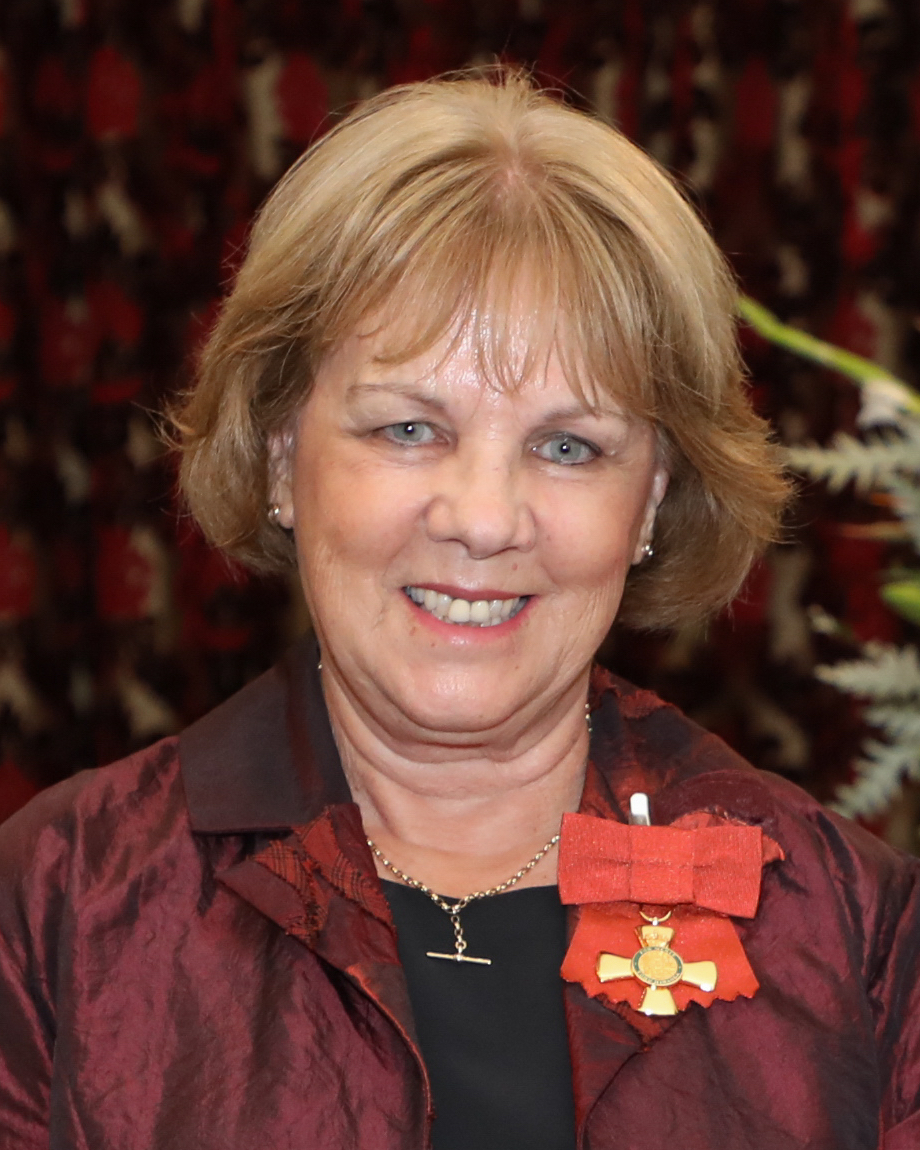
Susan Hassall

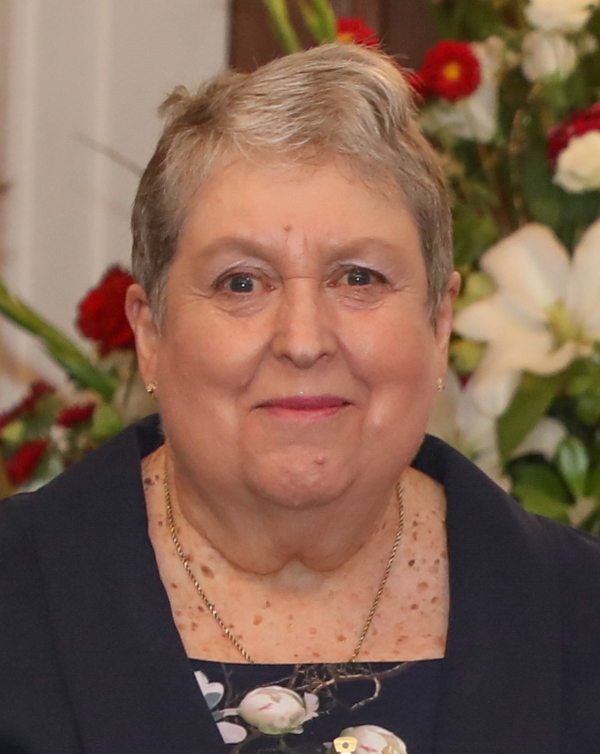
Anne Hawker

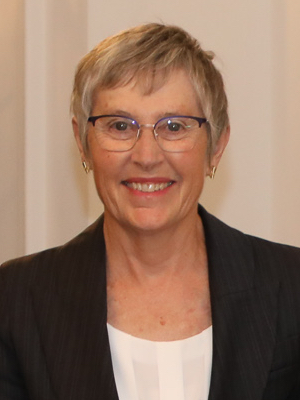
Paula Jameson

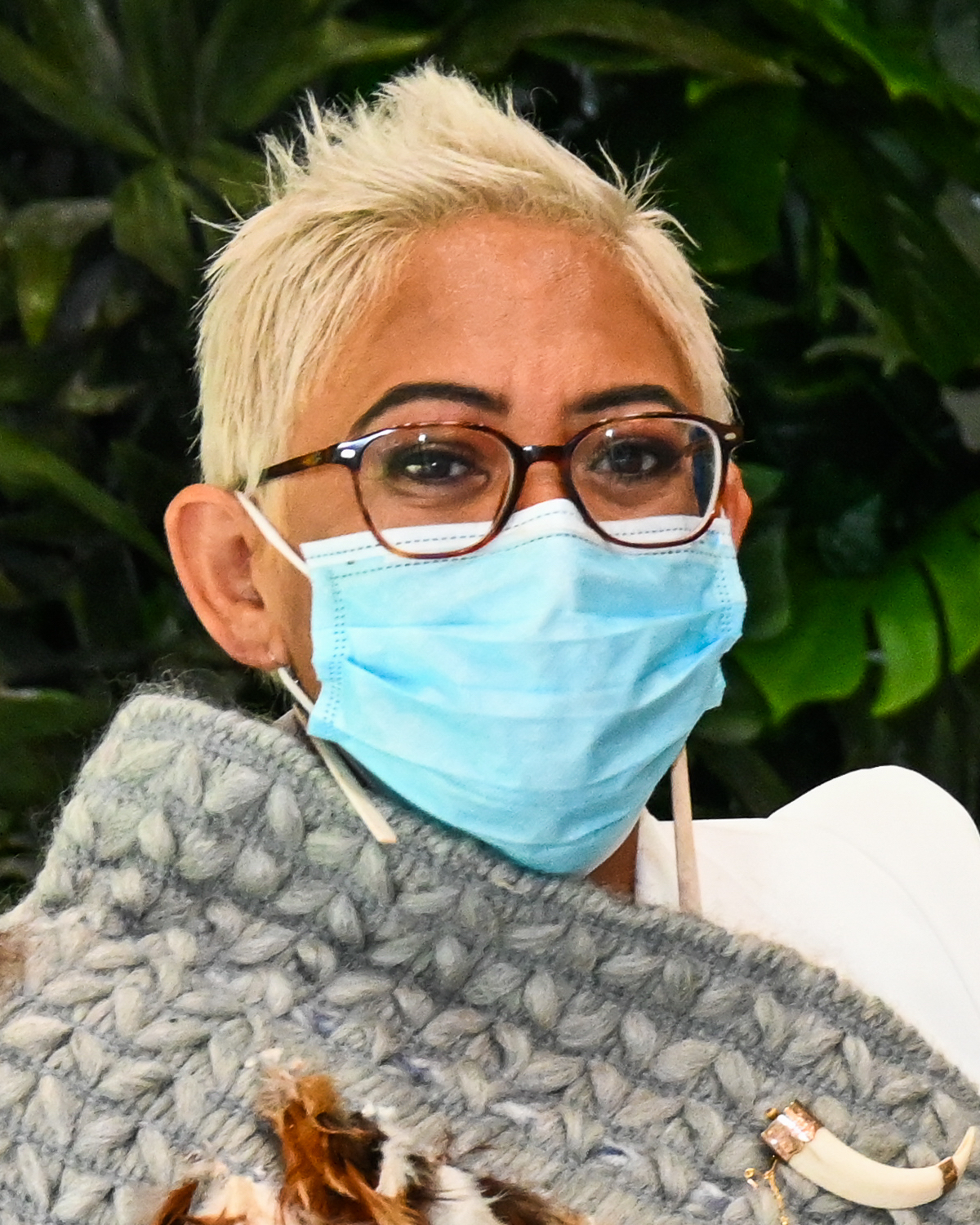
Takutai Tarsh Kemp

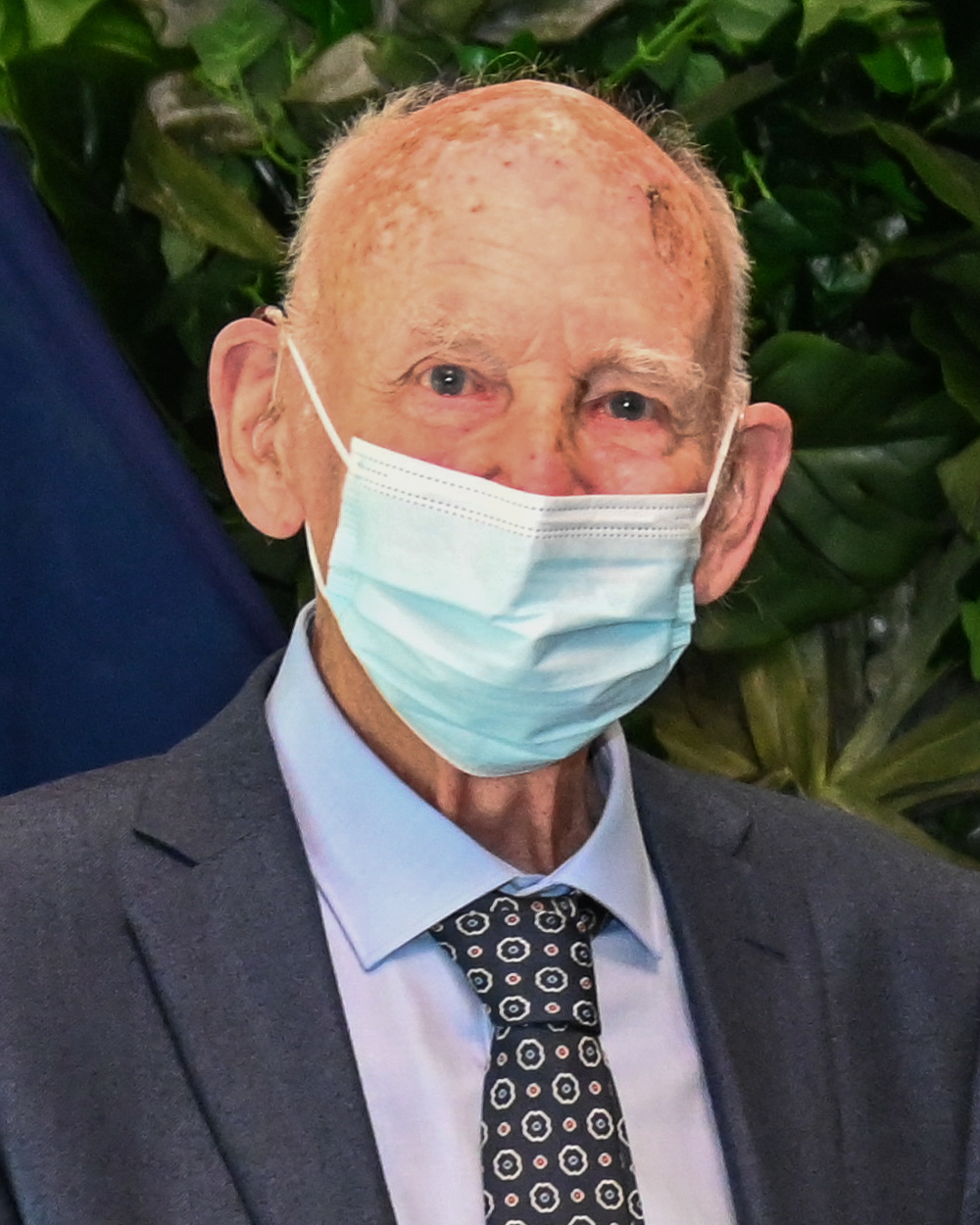
Robert Ludbrook

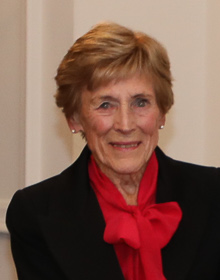
Mary McFarlane

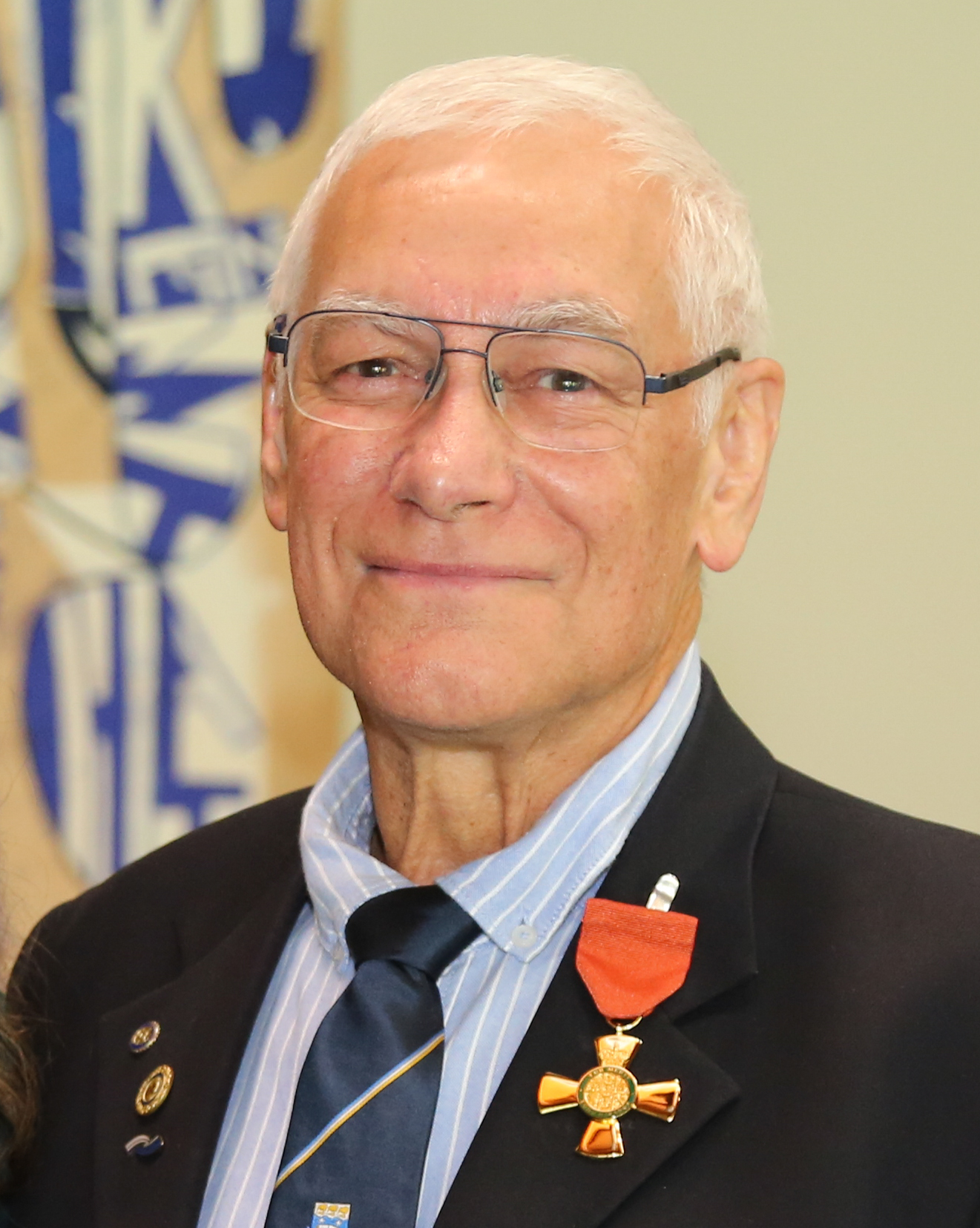
Benjamin Pittman

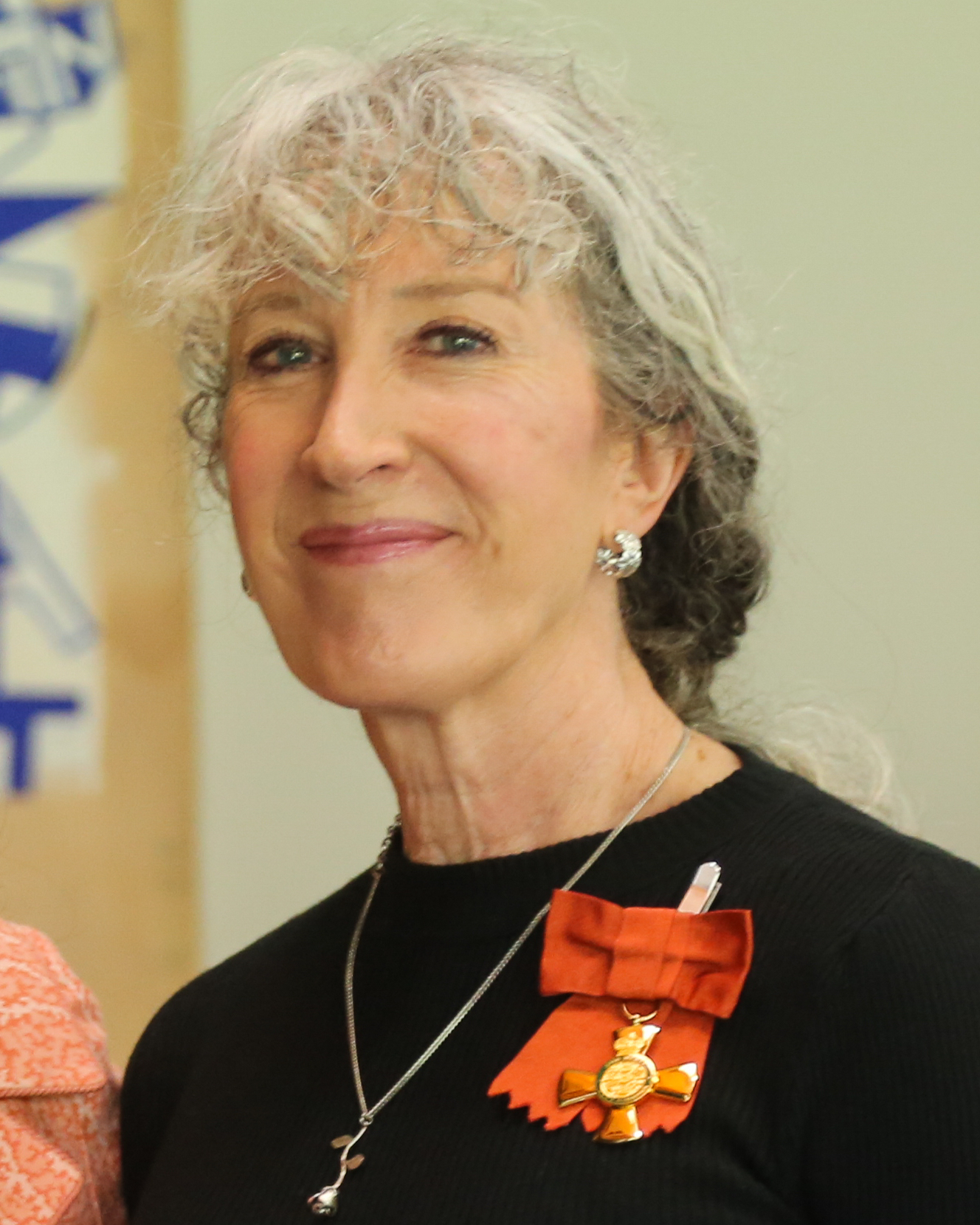
Fiona Riddell

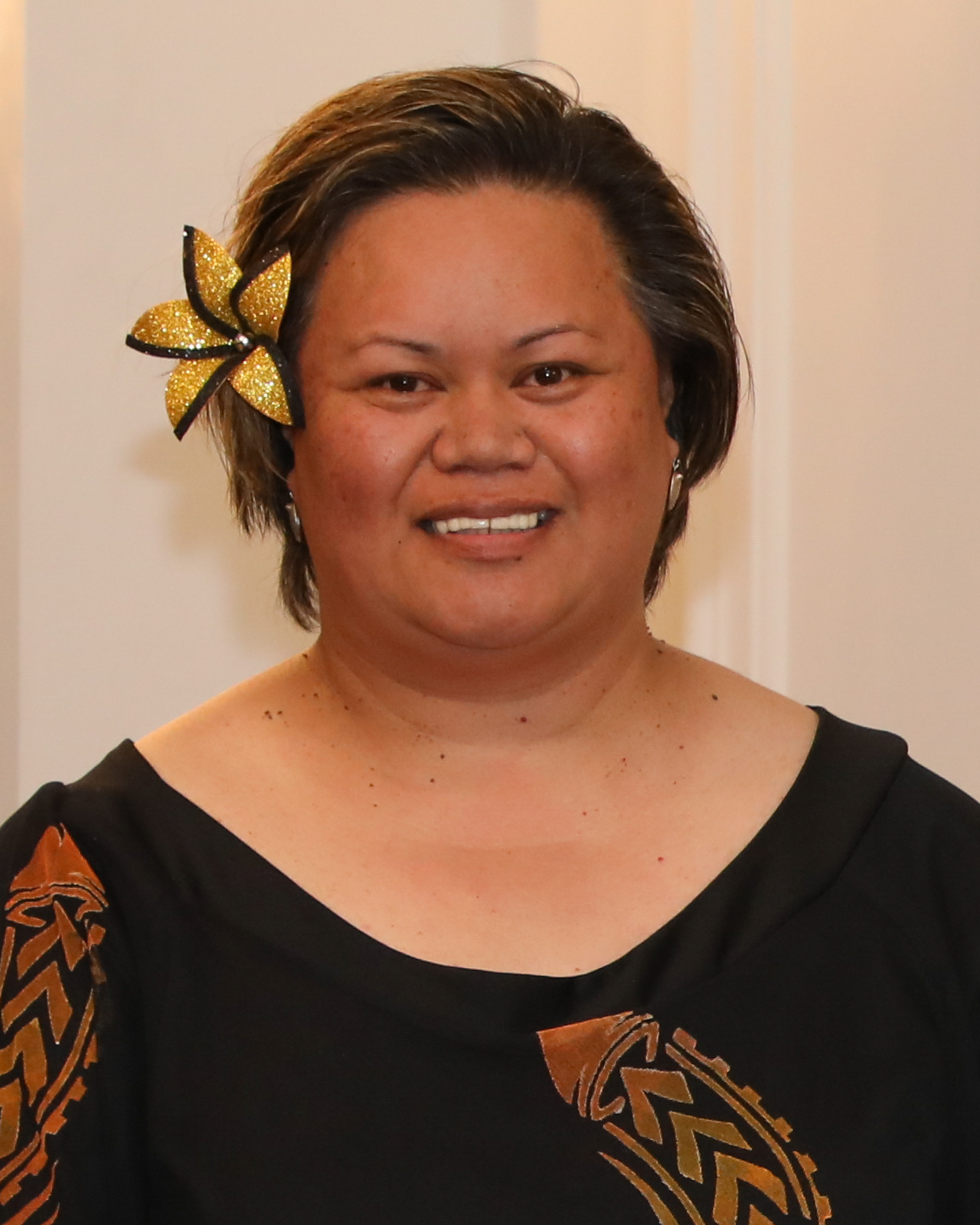
Mataiva Robertson

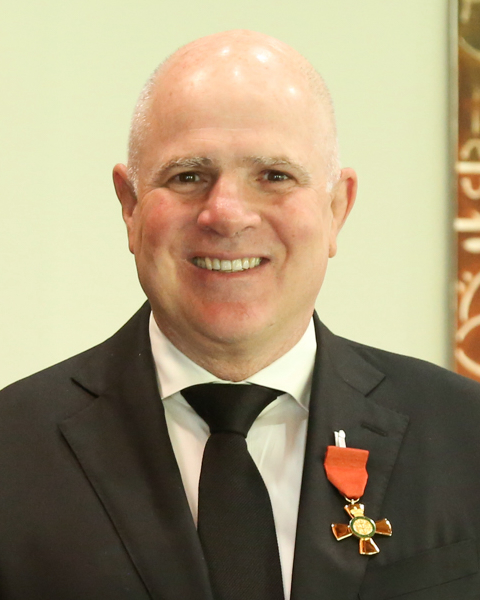
Ric Salizzo

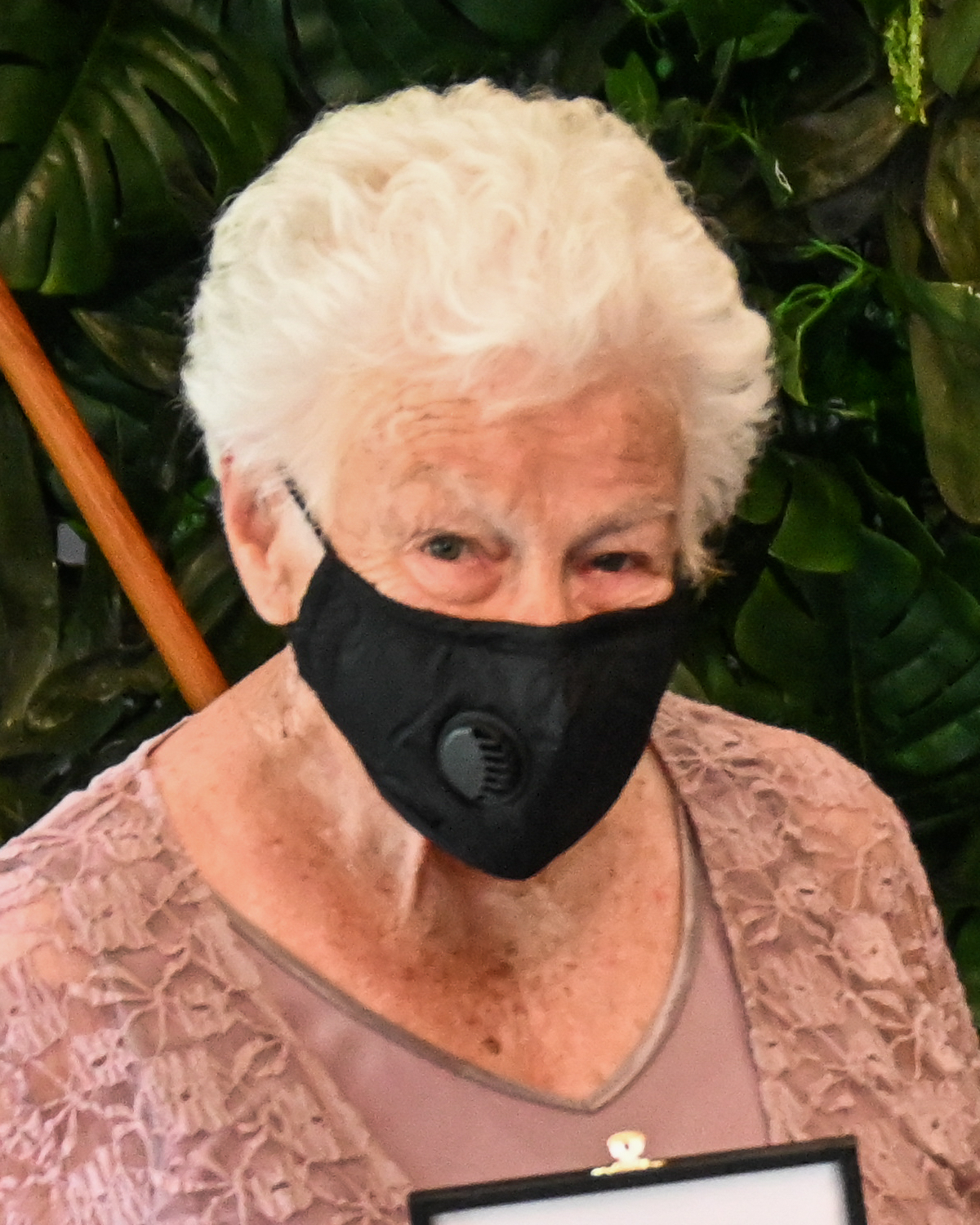
Noma Shepherd

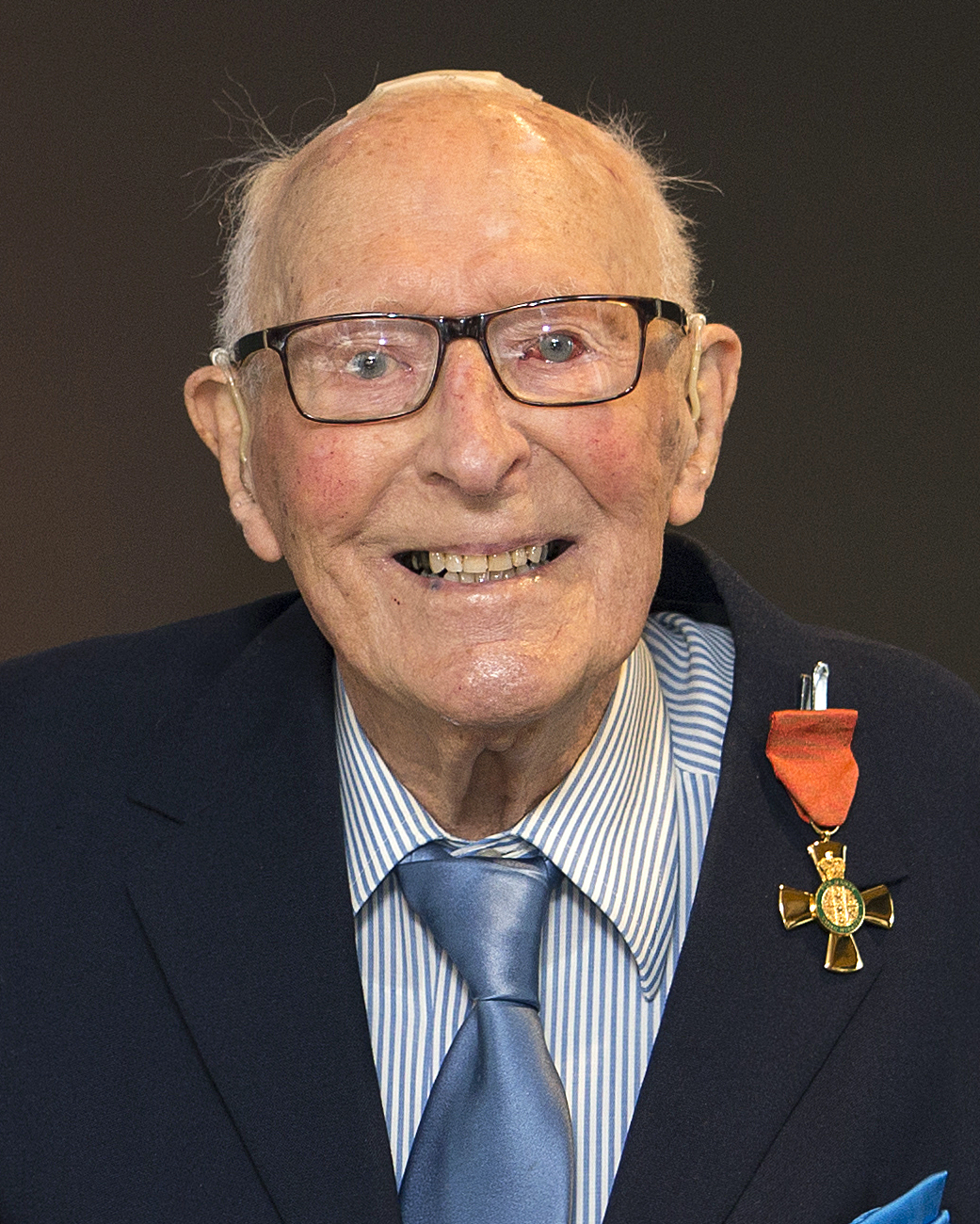
John Simpson

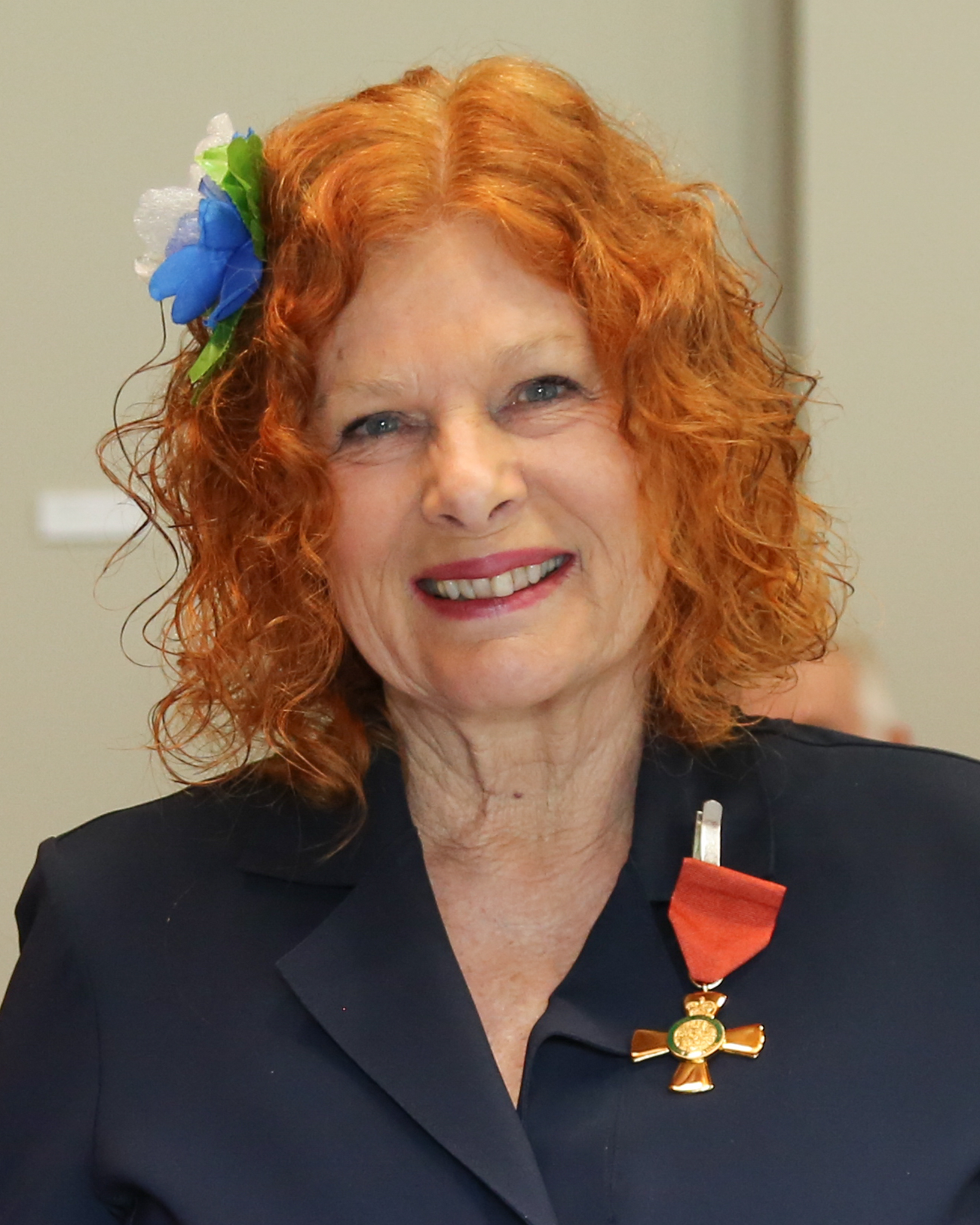
Darien Takle

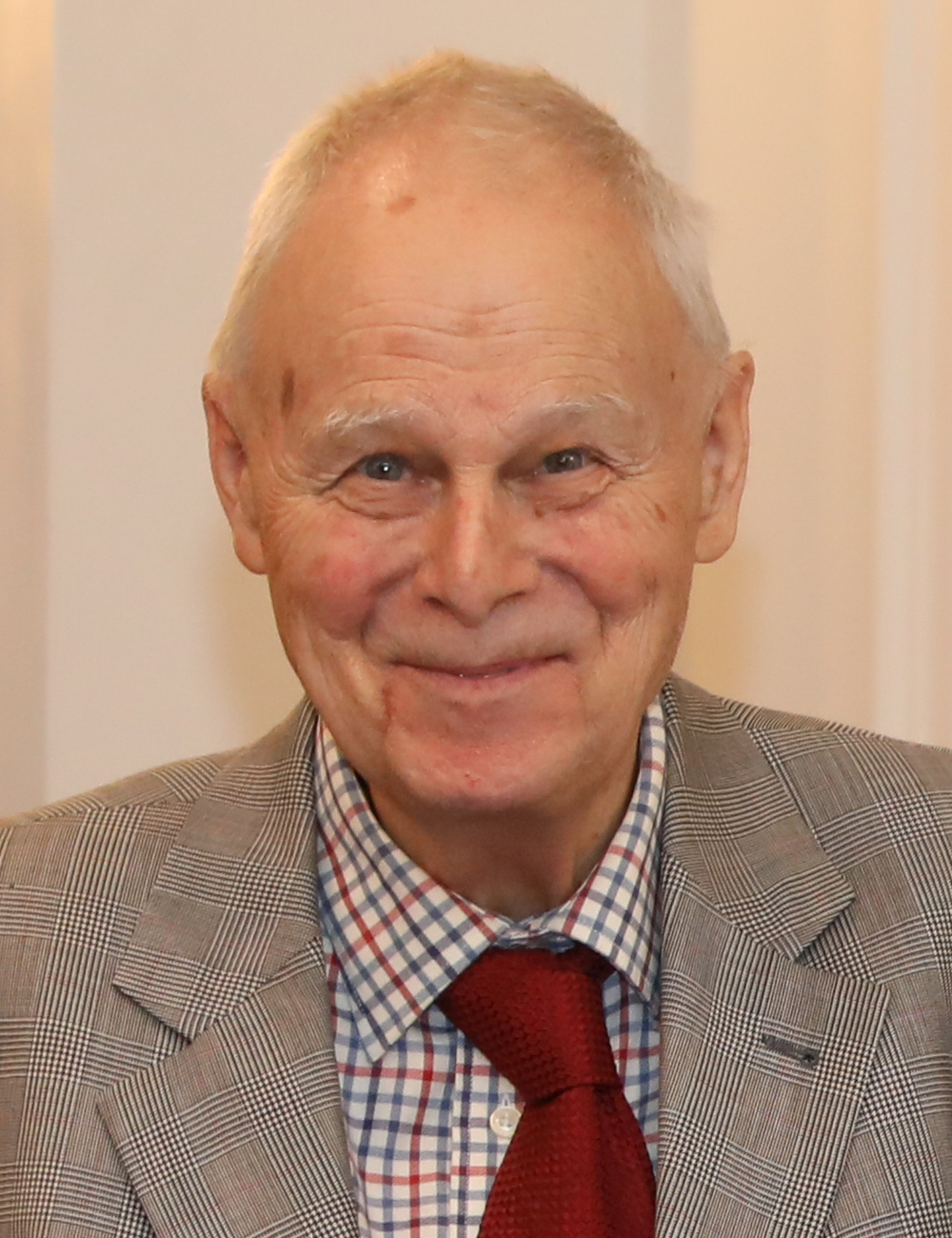
Philip Trusttum

=== Member (MNZM) ===
- Lynette Kaye Anderson – of Casebrook, Christchurch. For services to the zoological industry and conservation.
- David John Appleyard – of Stokes Valley. For services to education.
- Ryan Jeffrey Archibald – of Westmere. For services to hockey.
- Jane Ross Arnott – of Acacia Bay. For services to Pacific communities and conservation advocacy.
- Sergeant Gurpreet Singh Arora – of Golflands. For services to the New Zealand Police and ethnic communities.
- Richard Douglas Benge – of Newtown. For services to arts accessibility.
- Danielle Rachelle Bergin JP – of Point England. For services to the community, particularly the homeless.
- Murray Frank Binning – of Kumeū. For services to Fire and Emergency New Zealand.
- Adam Ngawati Blair – of Westmere. For services to rugby league.
- Cynthia Margaret Bowers – of Waipawa. For services to the community and local government.
- Dorothy Joy Burt – of Point England. For services to digital learning.
- Catherine Frances Cooney JP – of Holdens Bay. For services to health and the community.
- Yvette Louise Couch-Lewis – of Lyttelton. For services to conservation and Māori.
- Nicola Jane Denholm – of Mission Bay. For services to humanitarian advocacy and photography.
- Mustafa Ismail Derbashi – of Titirangi. For services to migrant and refugee communities.
- Margaret Ann Dodds – of Halswell. For services to special education.
- Graeme Alexander Downes – of Ōtaki. For services to music and music education.
- Miles Denis Ellery – of Ilam. For services to youth, education and the community.
- Siale Katoa Latu Pasa Faitotonu JP – of Upper Riccarton. For services to Pacific education.
- Kathleen Margaret Farrell – of Fitzroy, Hamilton. For services to netball.
- Margaret Marie Farry-Williams – of New Lynn. For services to the fashion industry and charitable fundraising.
- Dr Michael John Fletcher – of Strathmore. For services to social and public policy.
- Dr Janet Seymour Frater – of Greenlane. For services as a general practitioner.
- Lala Athene Frazer QSM – of Broad Bay. For services to conservation.
- Sameer Handa – of Parnell. For services to business and New Zealand–India relations.
- Iqbal Manzoor (Bali) Haque – of New Plymouth. For services to education governance.
- Bruce Henry Hart – of Kelson. For services to education.
- Francis William Helps – of Akaroa. For services to wildlife conservation.
- Shireen May Helps – of Akaroa. For services to wildlife conservation.
- Michael David Holdsworth – of Thorndon. For services to Special Olympics.
- Margaret Anne Hopkins – of Oban. For services to conservation and the community.
- Peter Ronald Horne – of Taitā. For services to bowls and Paralympic sport.
- Sally Anne Jackson JP – of Waikanae. For services to special education.
- Shirley Diane Kerr – of Rotorua. For services to mycology.
- Mary Louise Kisler – of Freemans Bay. For services to art history and curation.
- Hoani Sydney Langsbury – of Dunedin. For services to conservation.
- Shirley Audrey Lanigan – of Epuni. For services to nursing.
- Kenneth Bernard Laurent – of Whakatāne. For services to wildlife conservation.
- Susanne Maire Laurent – of Whakatāne. For services to wildlife conservation.
- Colleen Janice Lyons – of St Clair. For services to netball and education.
- Dr Peter Alexander Maddison – of Katikati. For services to conservation.
- Posenai Samoa Mavaega – of Mount Roskill. For services to Pacific performing arts.
- Tanya Soliali'i Mavaega (Tanya Muagututi'a) – of Mount Roskill. For services to Pacific performing arts.
- Phillis-Jean Meti – of Avondale. For services to sport, particularly golf.
- Mani Bruce Mitchell – of Brooklyn. For services to intersex advocacy and education.
- Ted Turua Ngataki – of Papakura. For services to Māori and the community.
- Caron Orelowitz – of Mount Albert. For services to podiatry.
- Karoline Fuarosa Park-Tamati (Ladi6) – of Mount Eden. For services to music.
- Janet Louise Peters – of Mount Maunganui. For services to mental health.
- Stephen Leslie Phillips JP – of Rolleston. For services to seniors and the community.
- Samantha Anne Powell (Dr Samantha Murton) – of Brooklyn. For services to medical education, particularly general practice.
- Tere Veronica Rapley – of Auckland. For services to music and television.
- Maxine Khrona Shortland – of Kawakawa. For services to netball and governance.
- Robin John Simmons – of Kimbolton. For services to the rail industry.
- Gina Solomon – of Kaikōura. For services to conservation and governance.
- Reverend Janice Ellen Stead – of Parklands. For services to sport and the community.
- Mairehe Louise Marie Tankersley – of Sydenham. For services to prisoners' welfare and Māori.
- Gabriel Pikiao Edward Te Moana – of Tūrangi. For services to Māori and governance.
- Helen Theresa Cecilia Varney – of Devonport. For services to education, particularly Pacific education.
- Karen Vercoe – of Victoria, Rotorua. For services to governance and sport.
- Graeme Douglas Watts – of Whangamatā. For services to the community and charity fundraising.
- Heather Margaret Williamson JP – of Tokoroa. For services to netball and the community.
- Tracey Lee Wright-Tawha – of Windsor, Invercargill. For services to health and Māori

Honorary

- Louisa Humphry – of Thames. For services to the Kiribati community and culture.
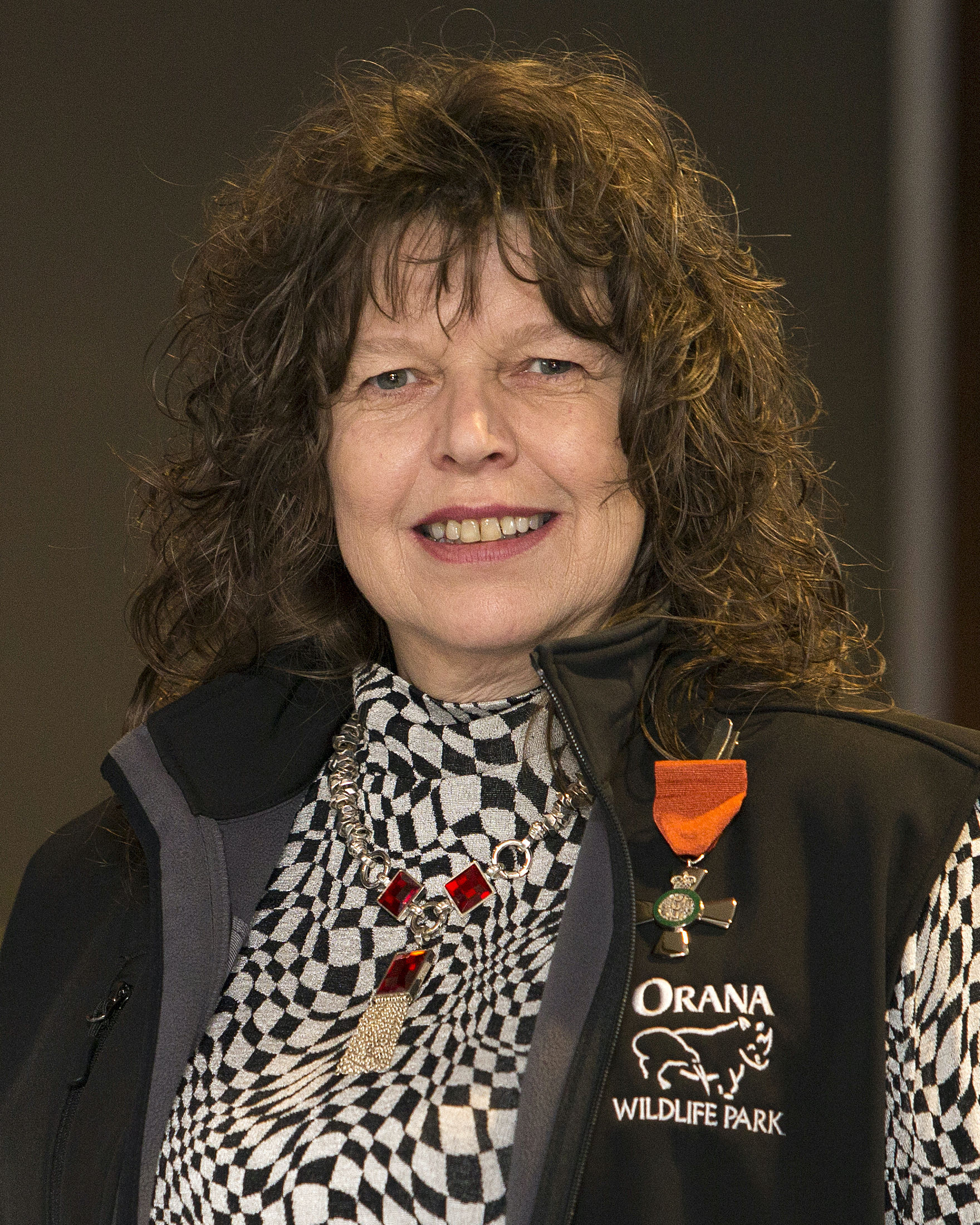
Lynn Anderson

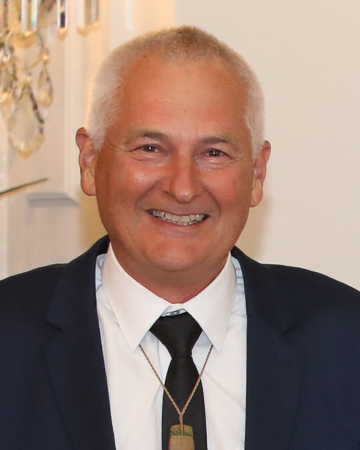
Dave Appleyard

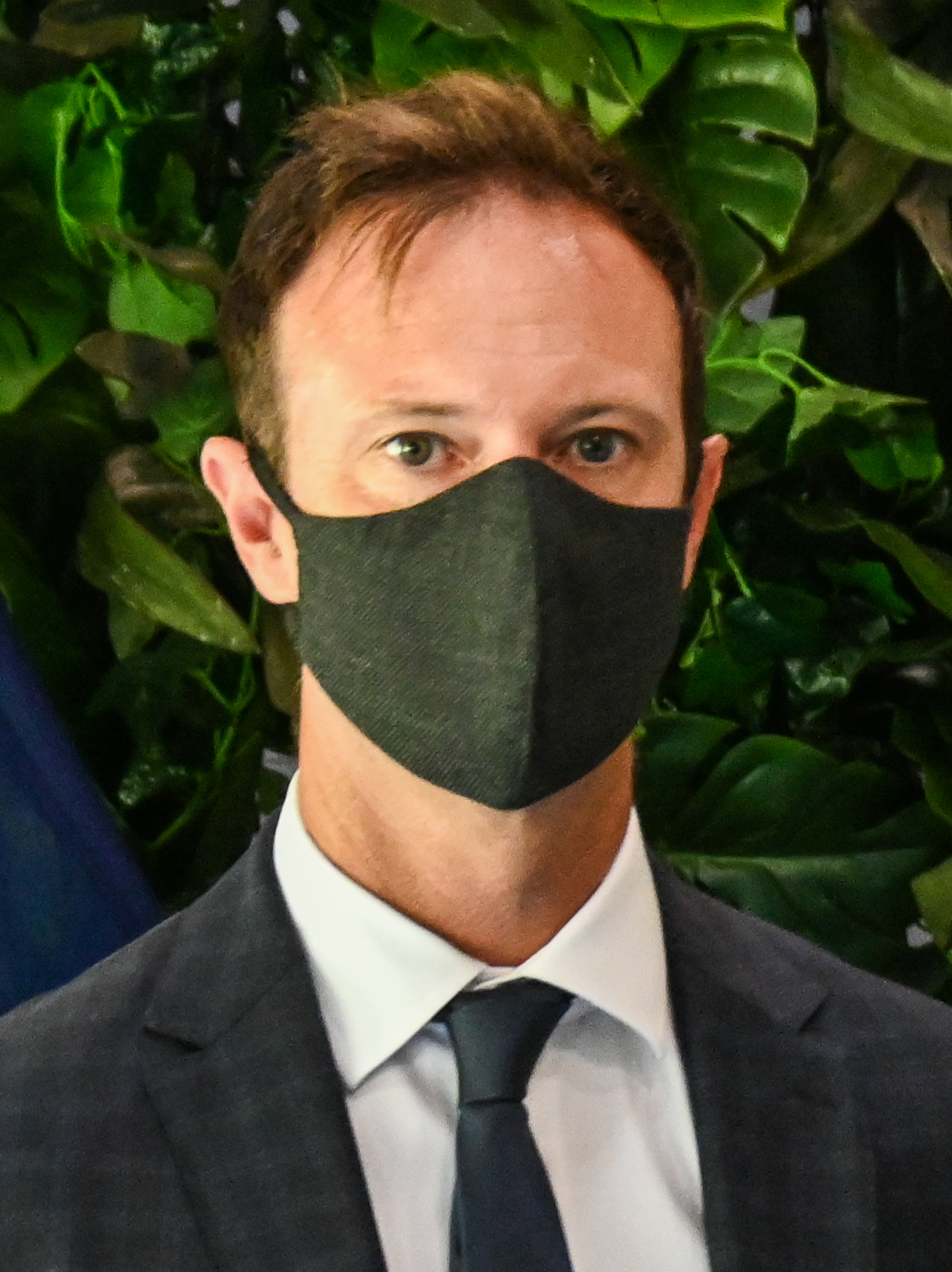
Ryan Archibald

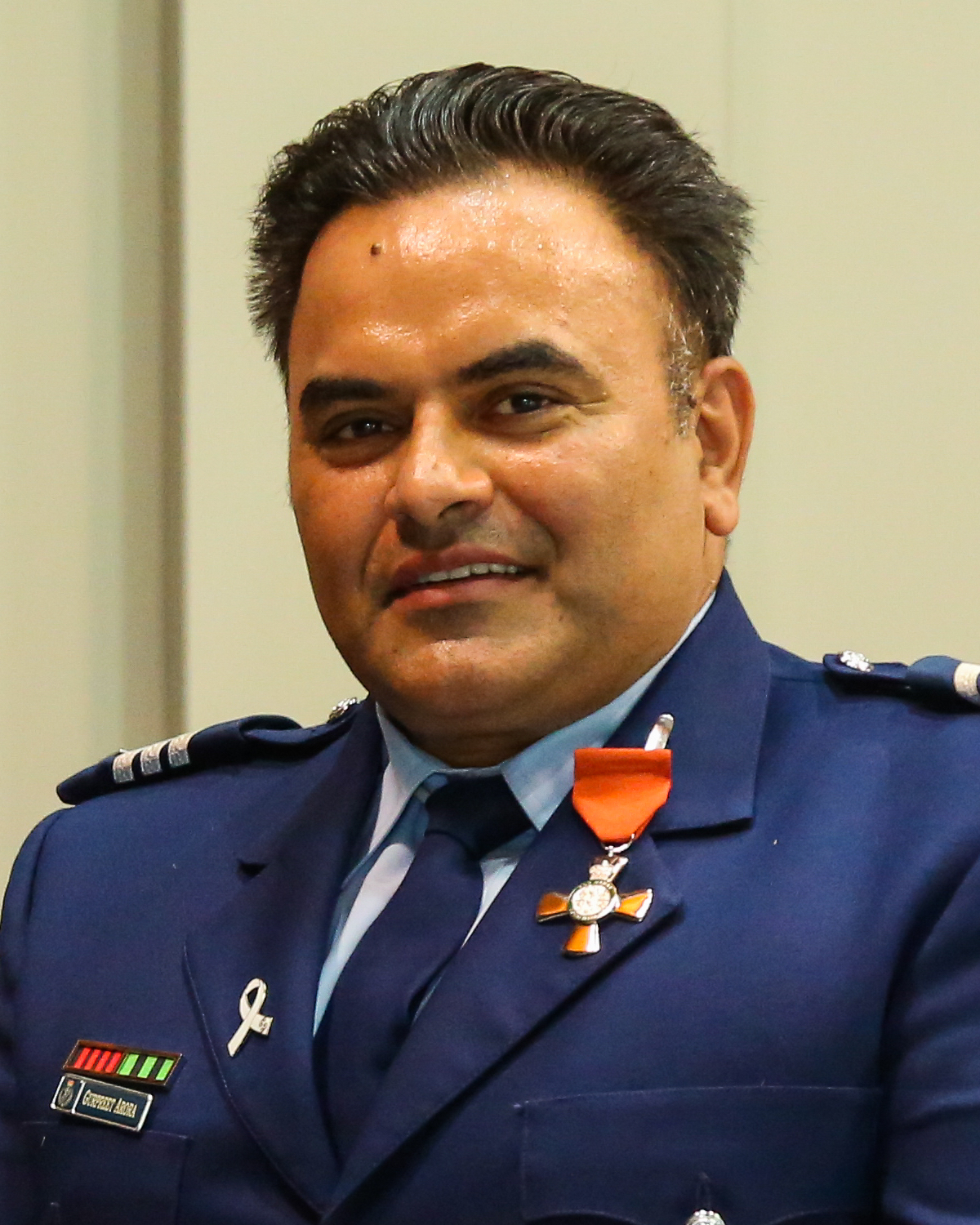
Gurpreet Arora

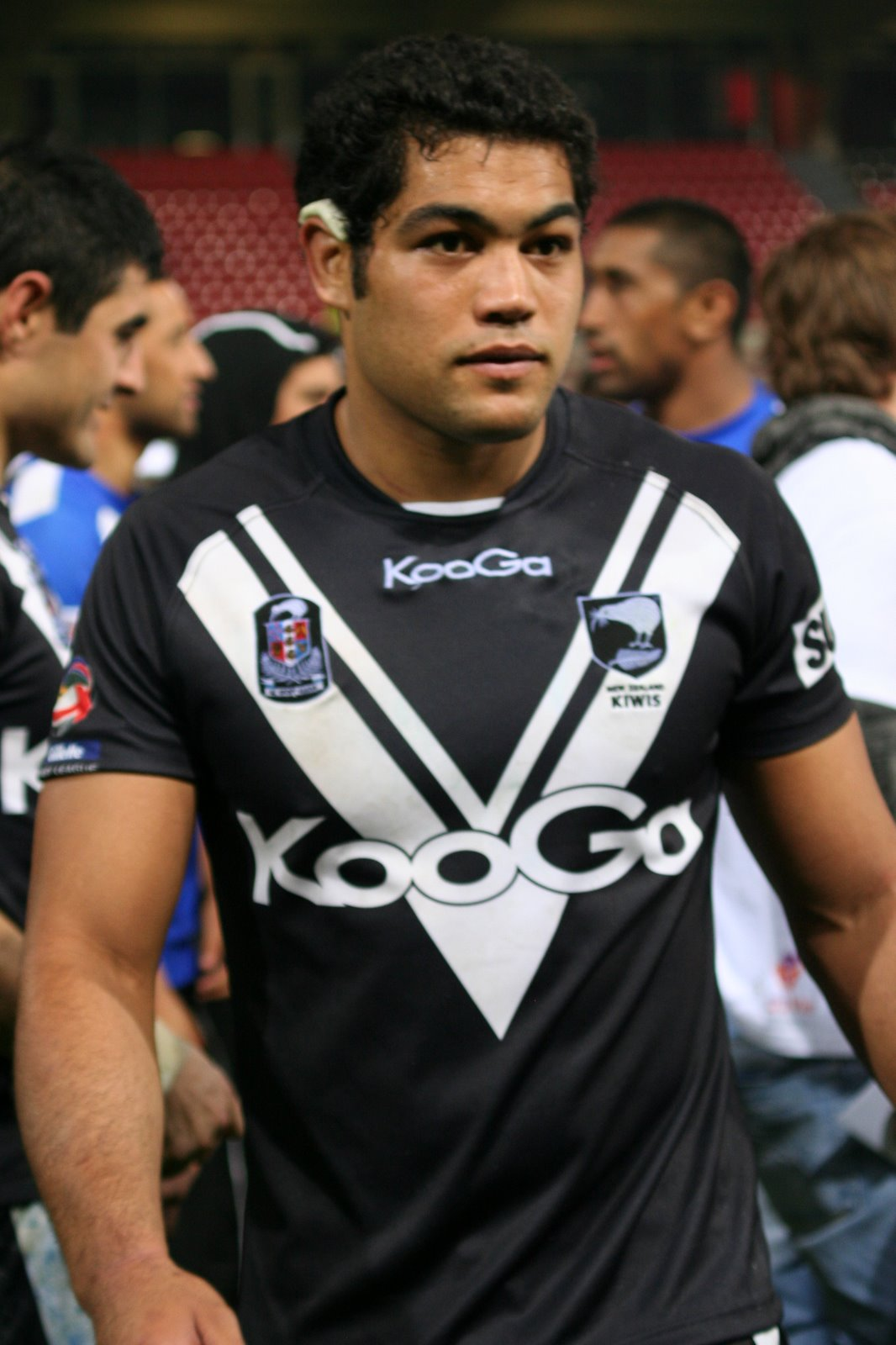
Adam Blair

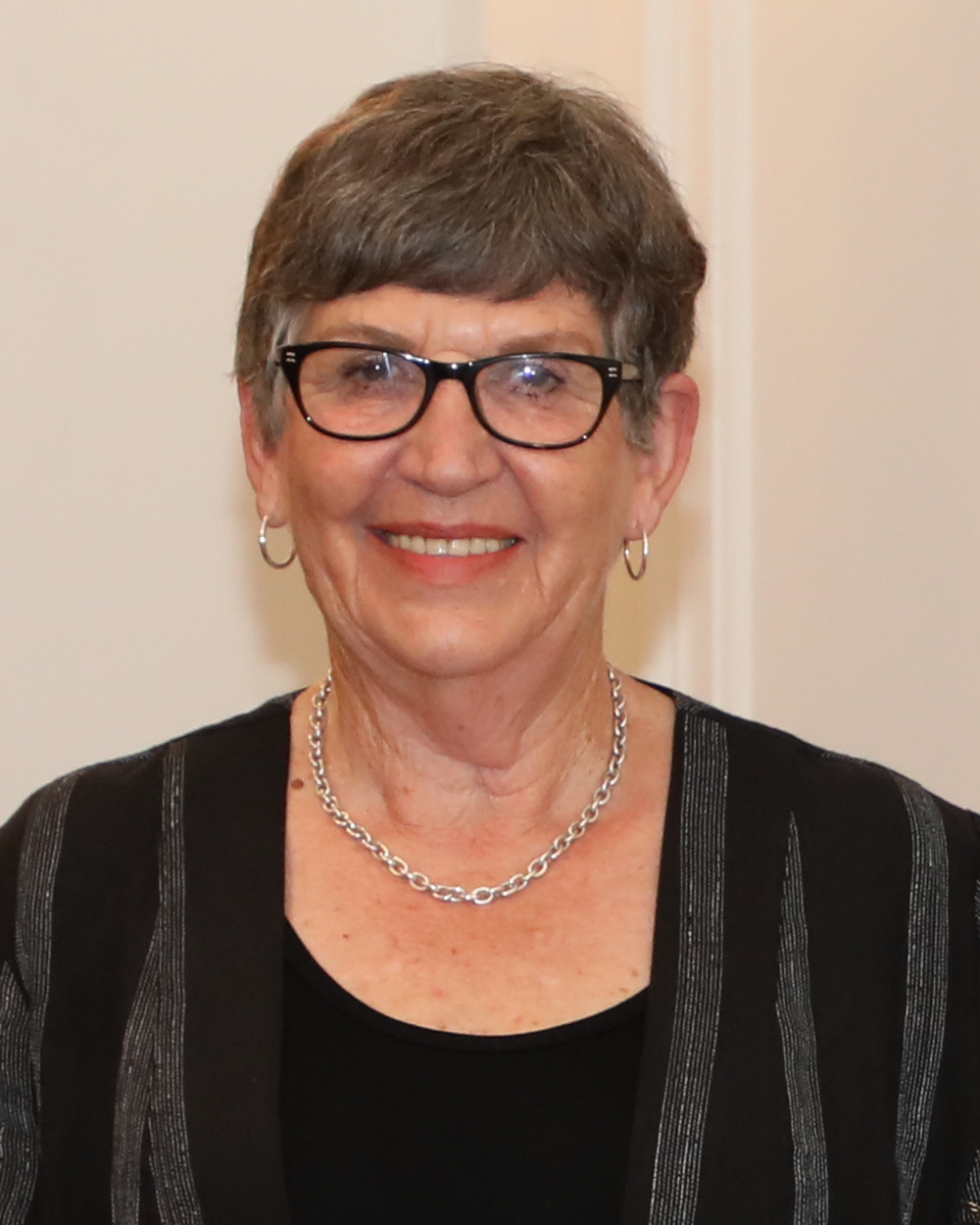
Cynthia Bowers

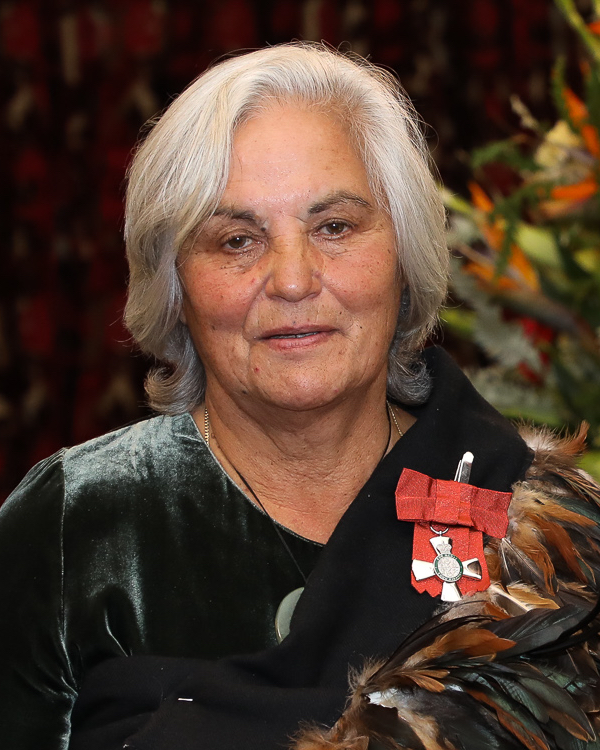
Yvette Couch-Lewis

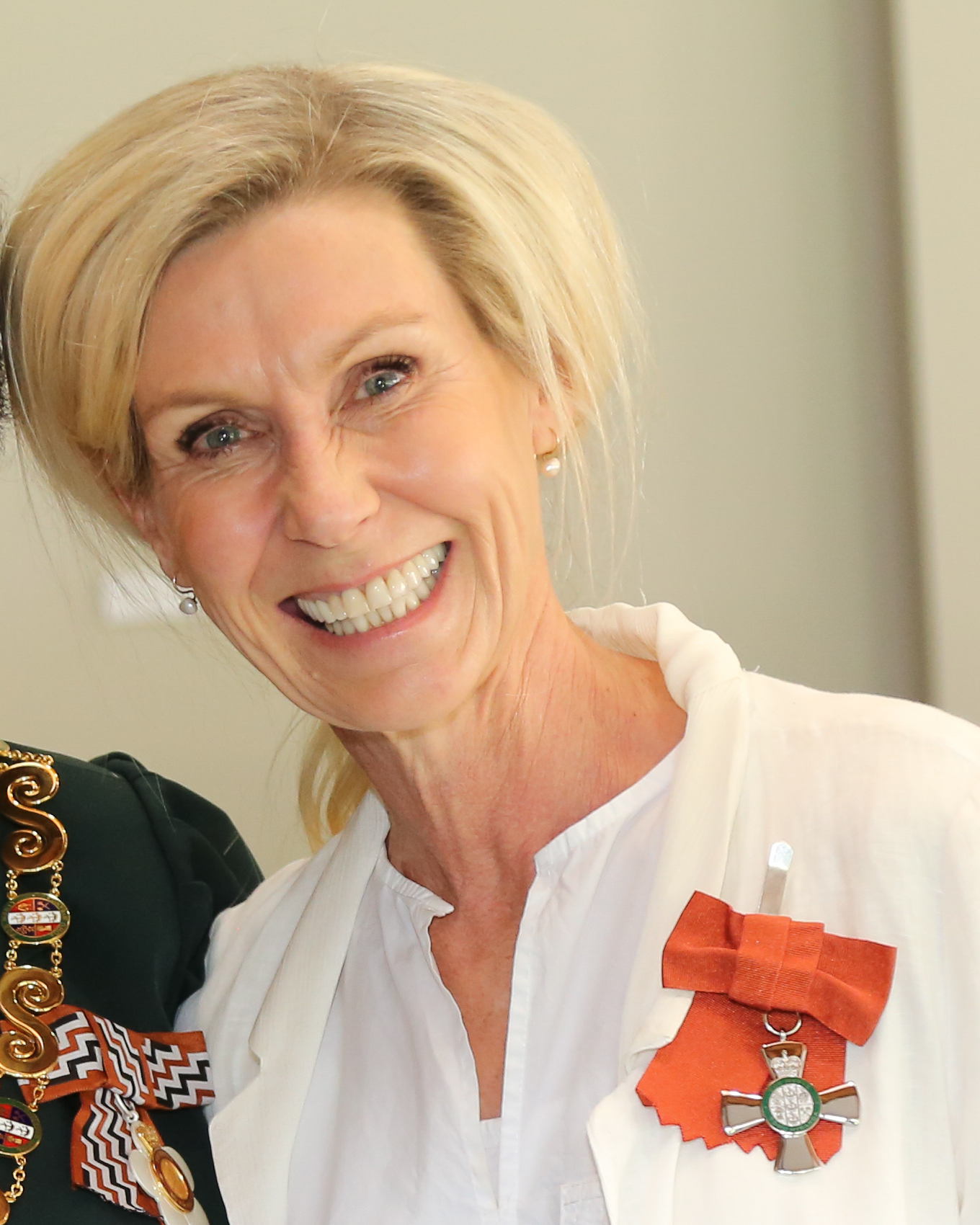
Nikki Denholm

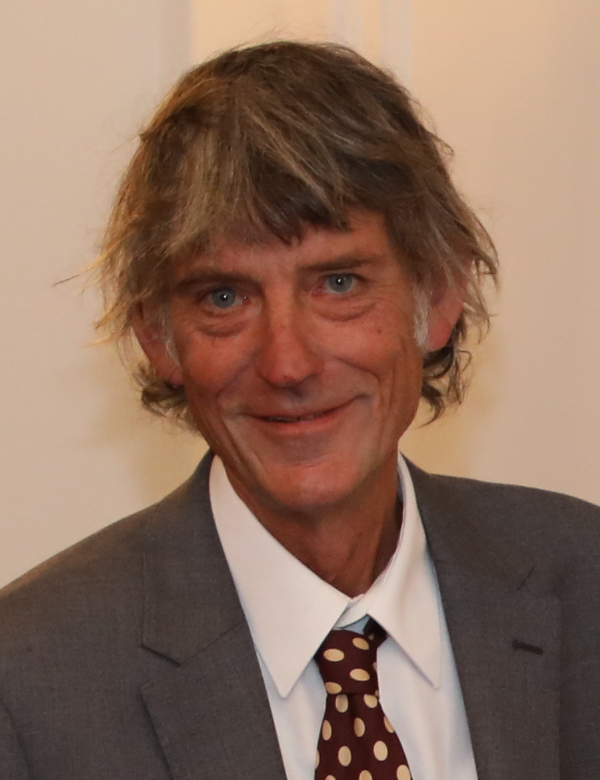
Graeme Downes

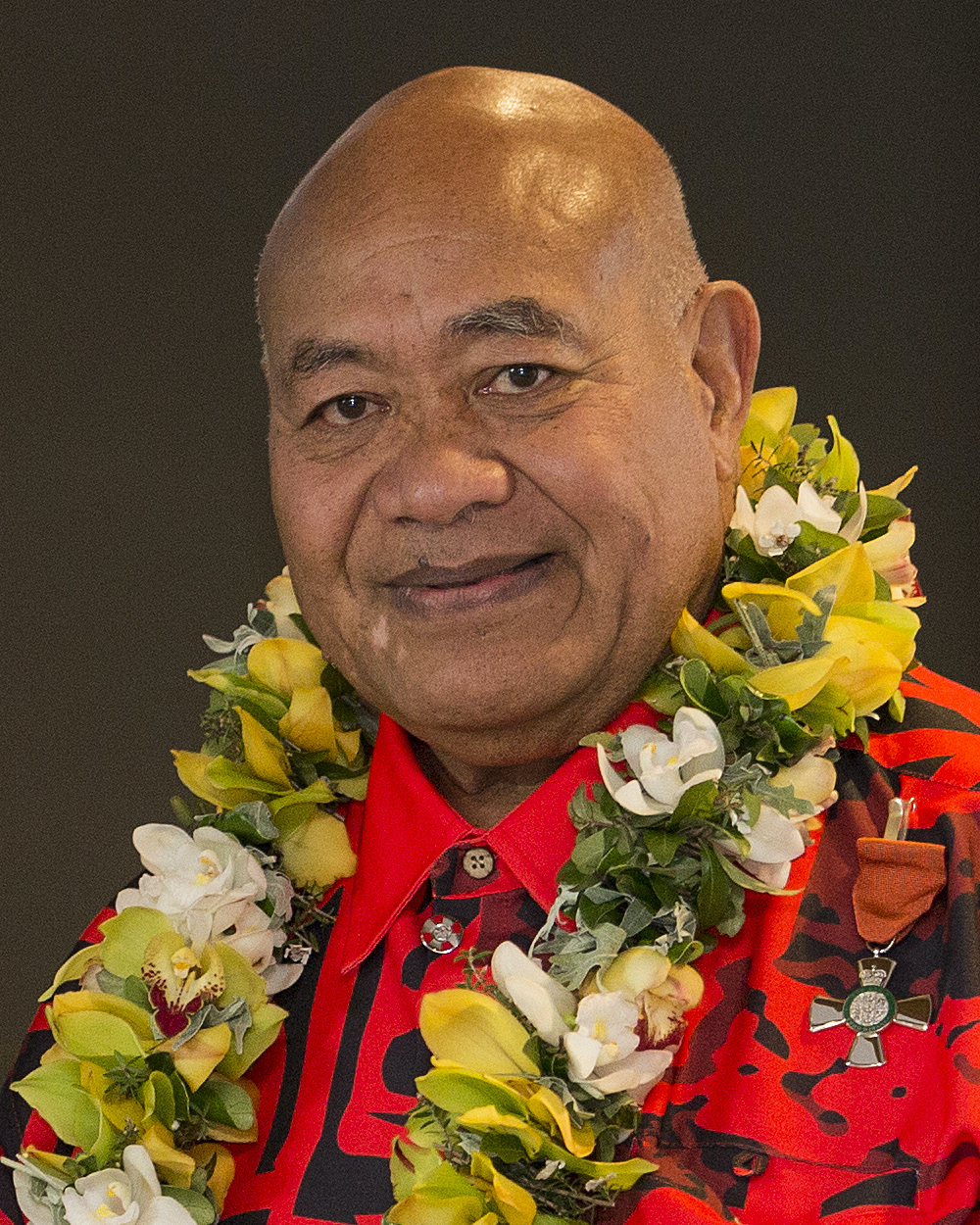
Siale Faitotonu

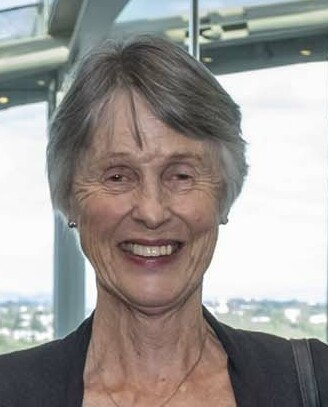
Janet Frater

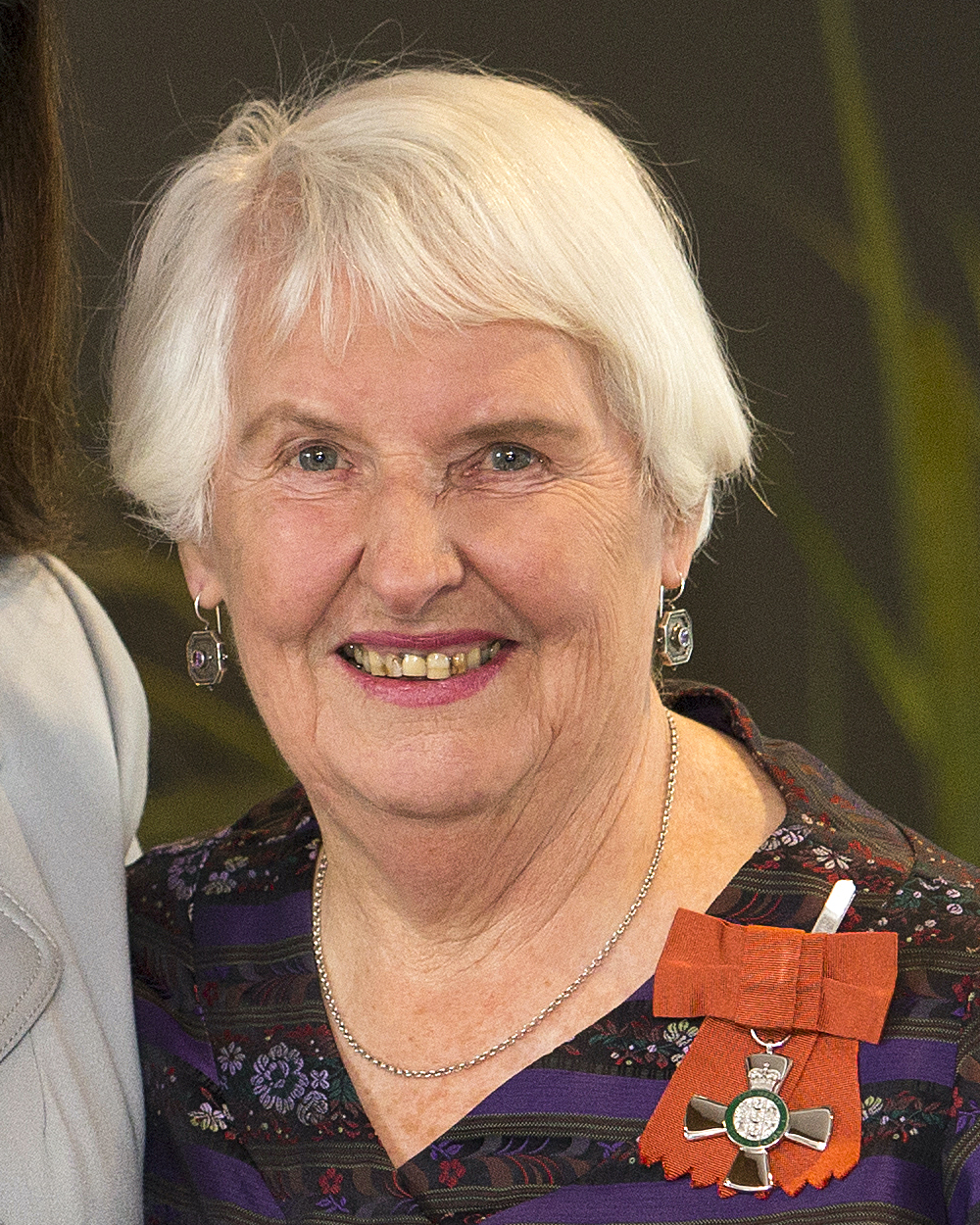
Lala Frazer

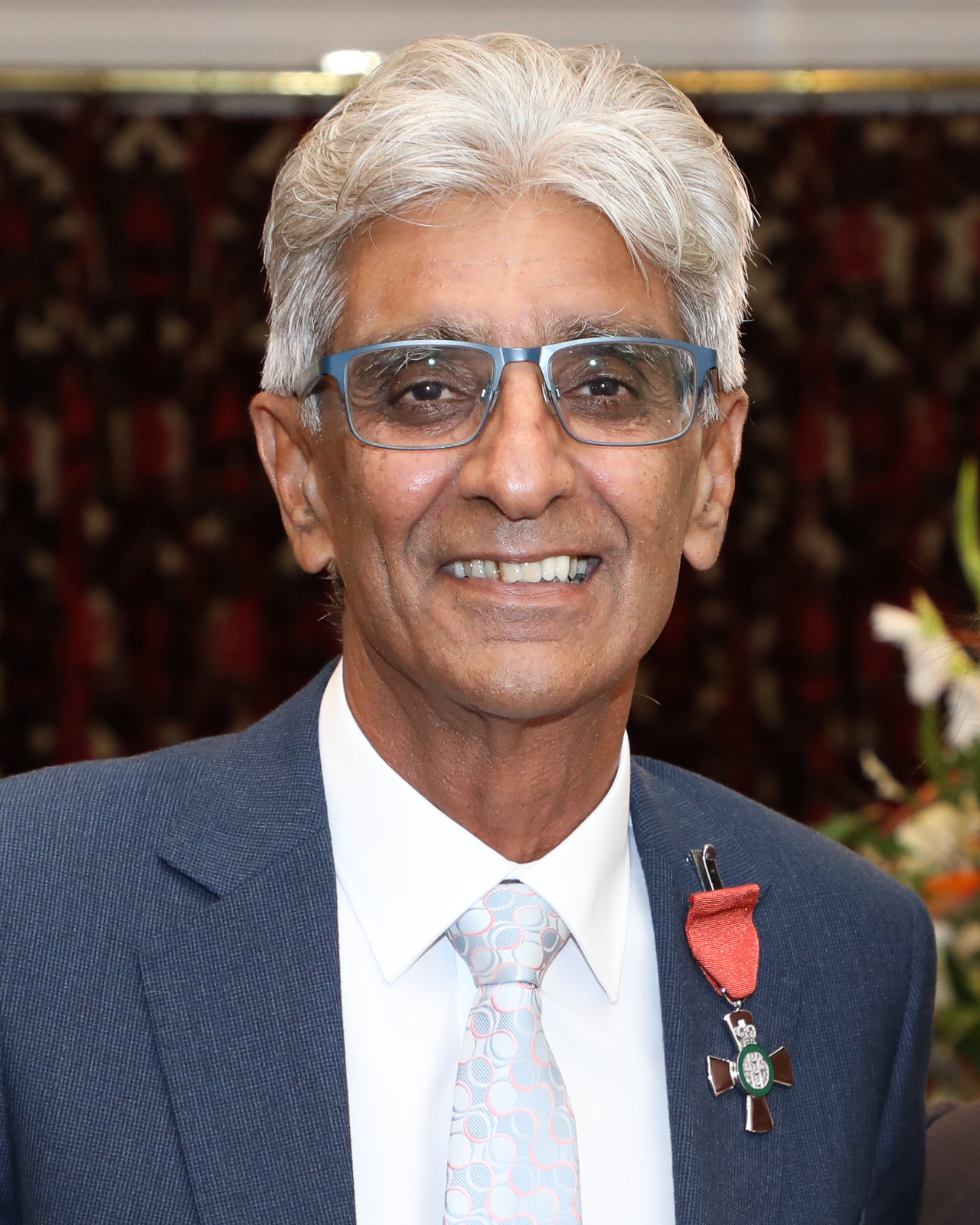
Bali Haque

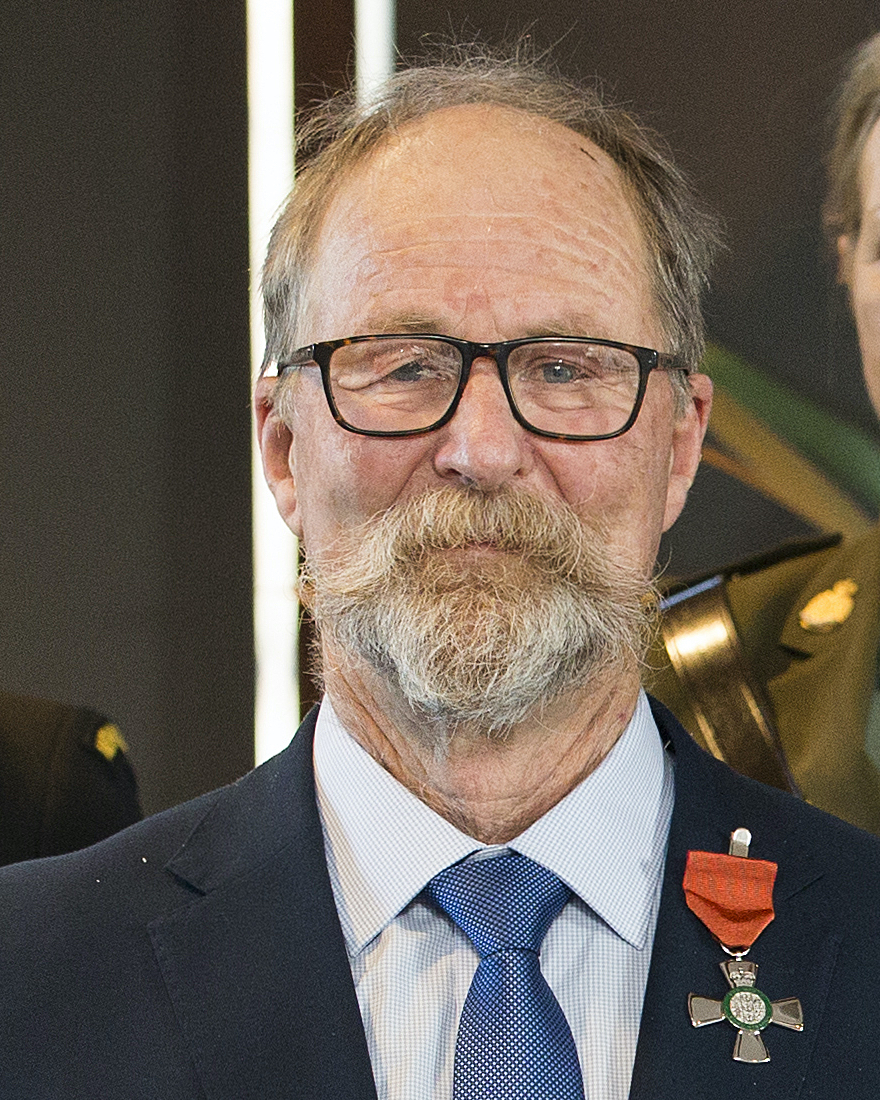
Francis Helps

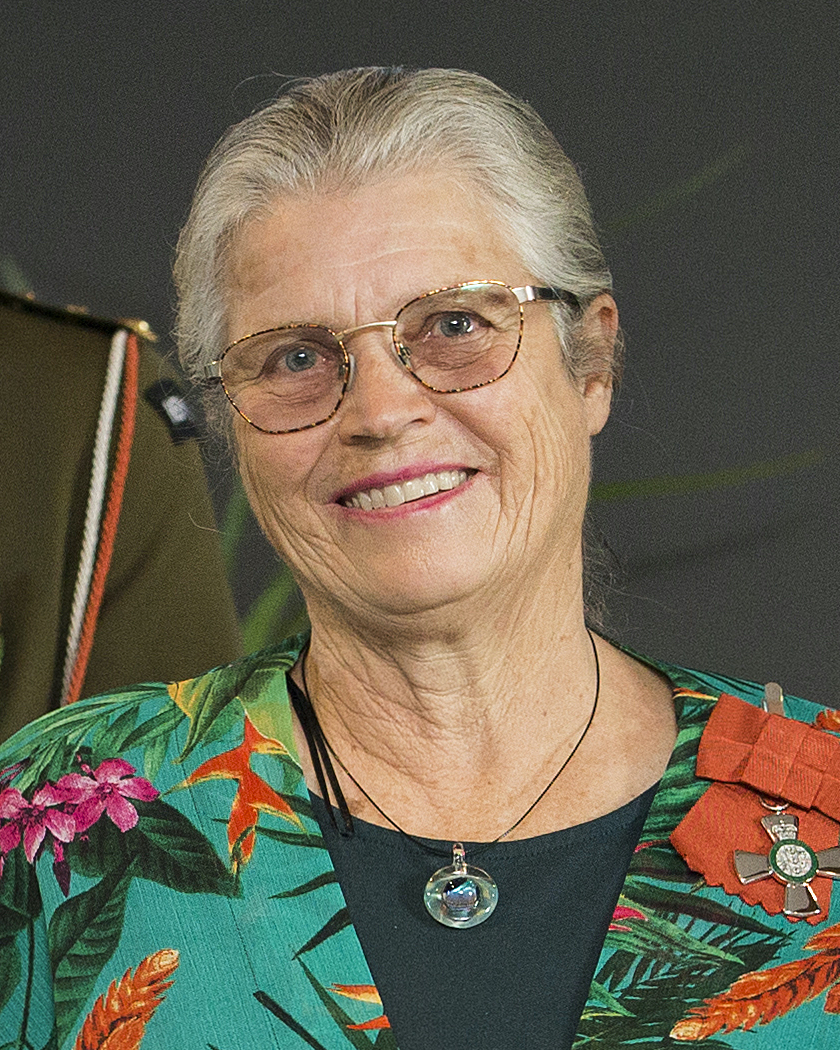
Shireen Helps

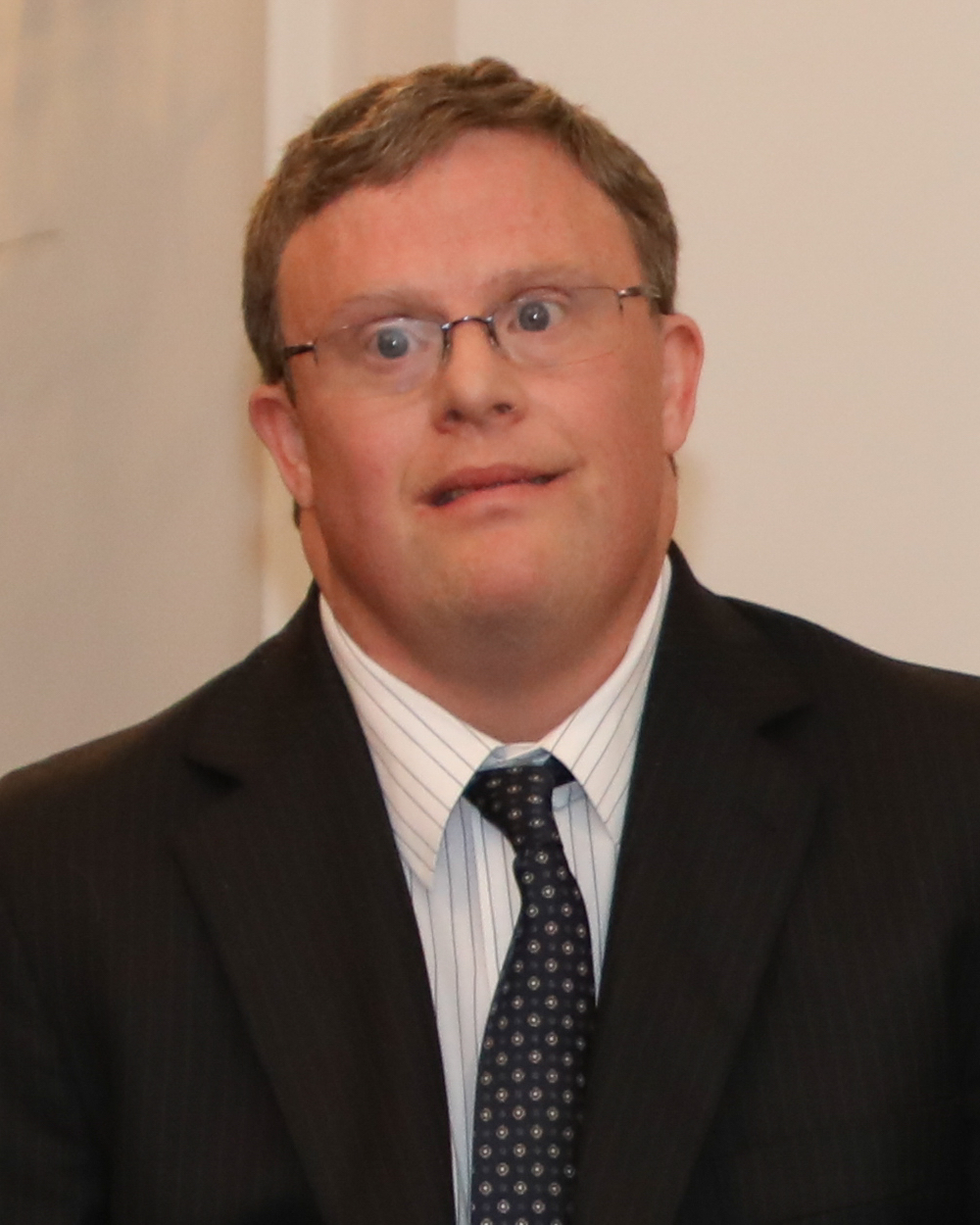
Michael Holdsworth

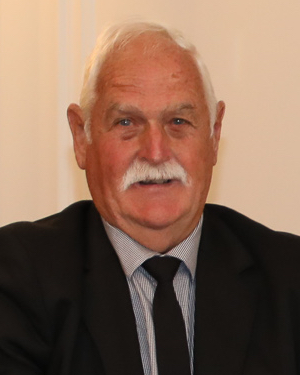
Peter Horne

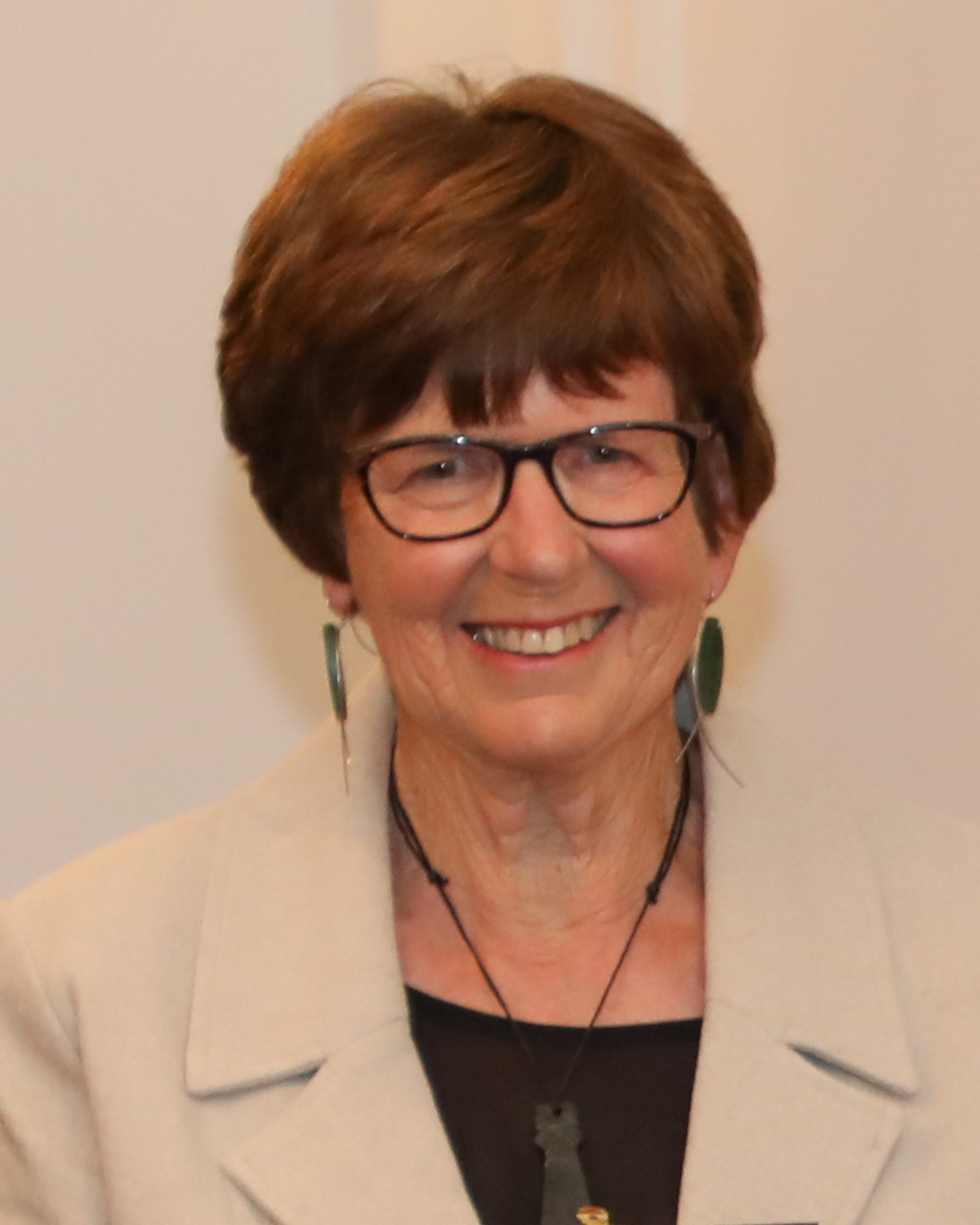
Sally Jackson

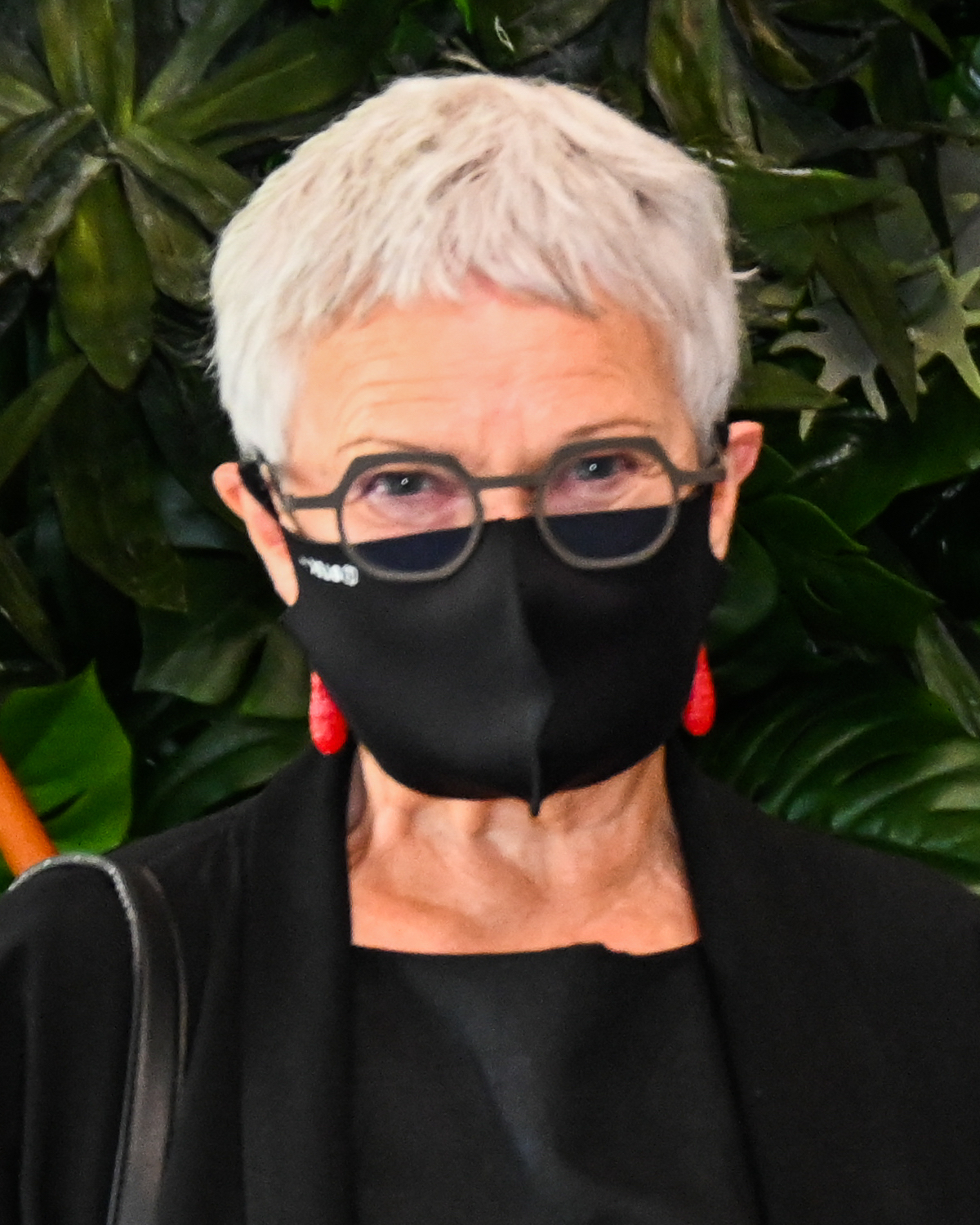
Mary Kisler

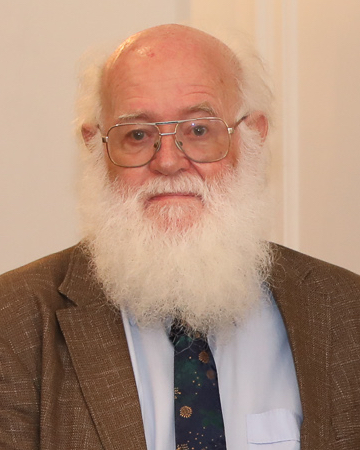
Peter Maddison

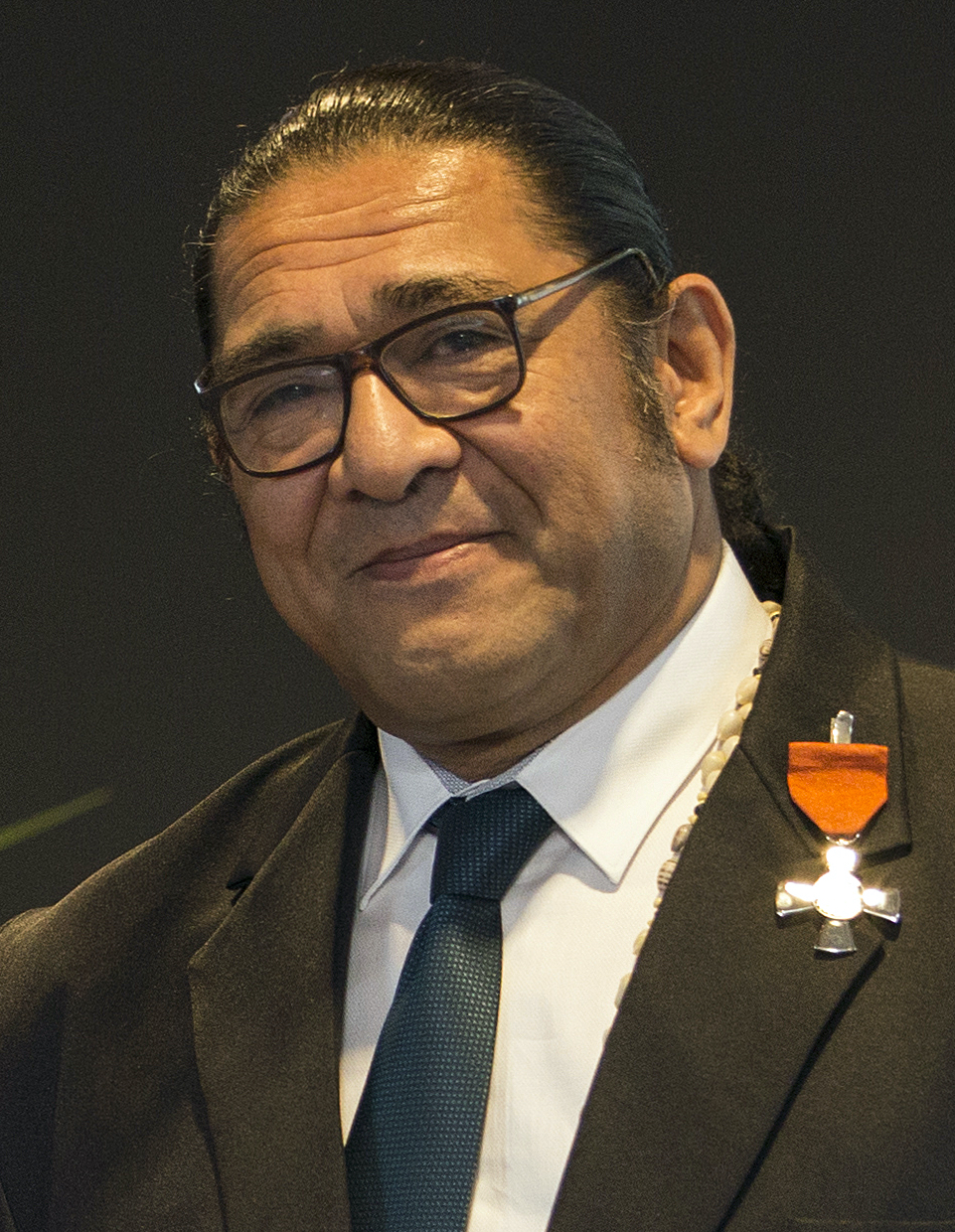
Posenai Mavaega

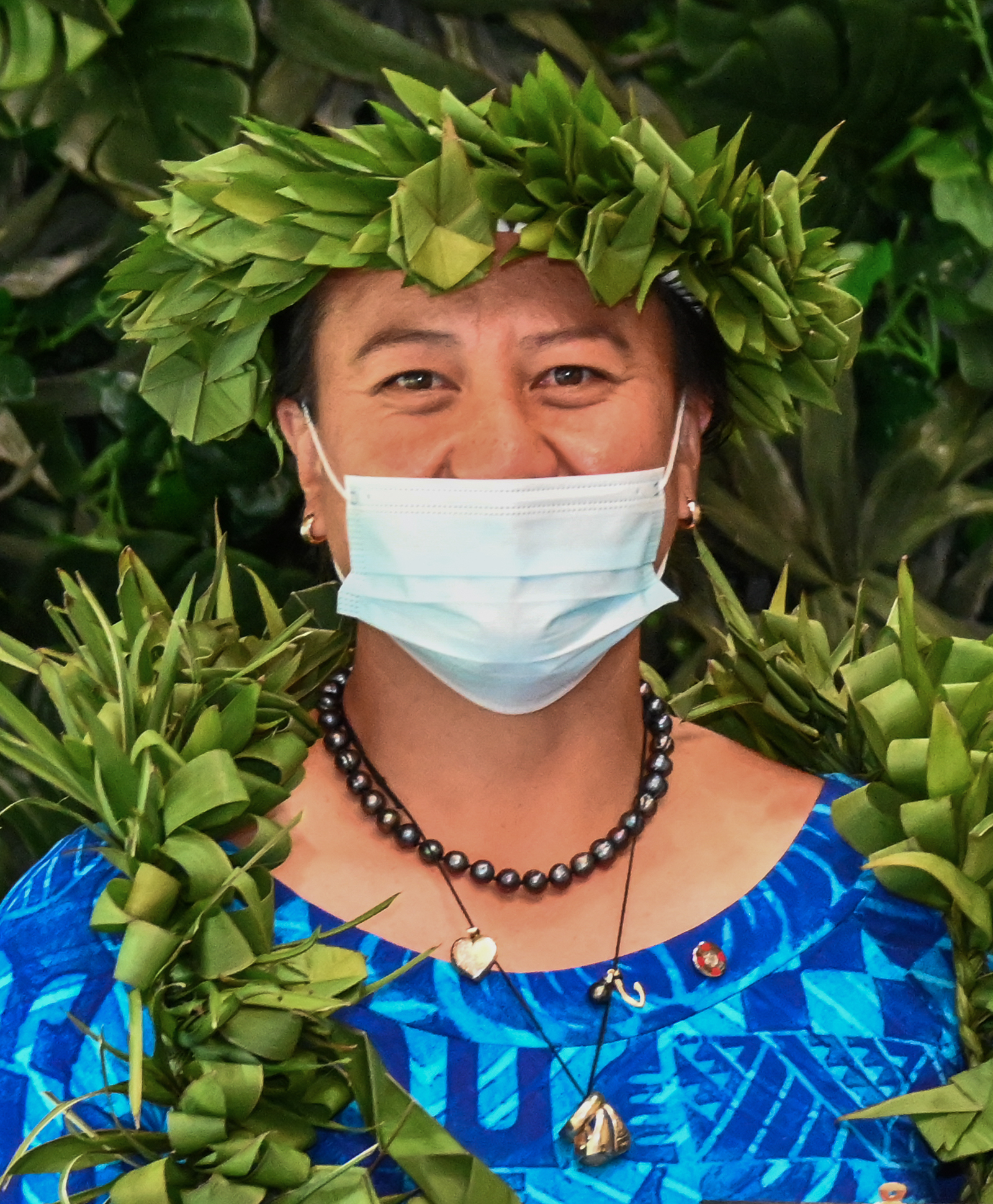
Phillis Meti

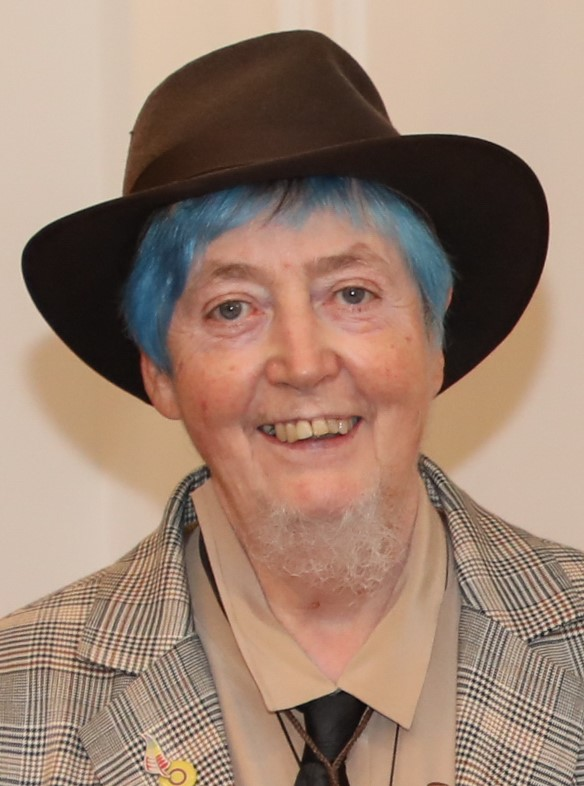
Mani Mitchell

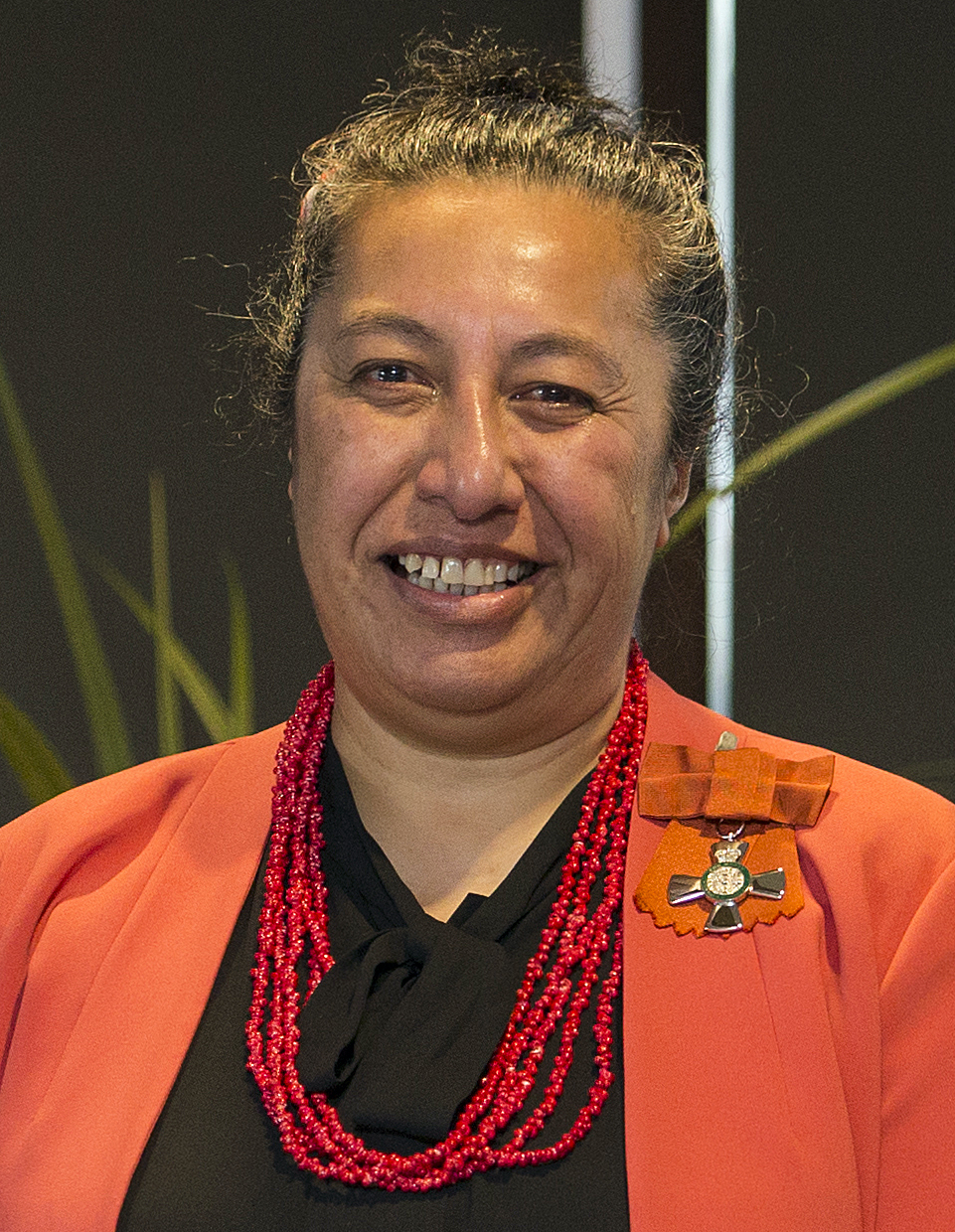
Tanya Muagututi'a

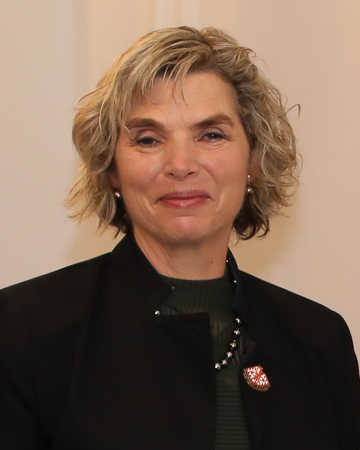
Samantha Murton

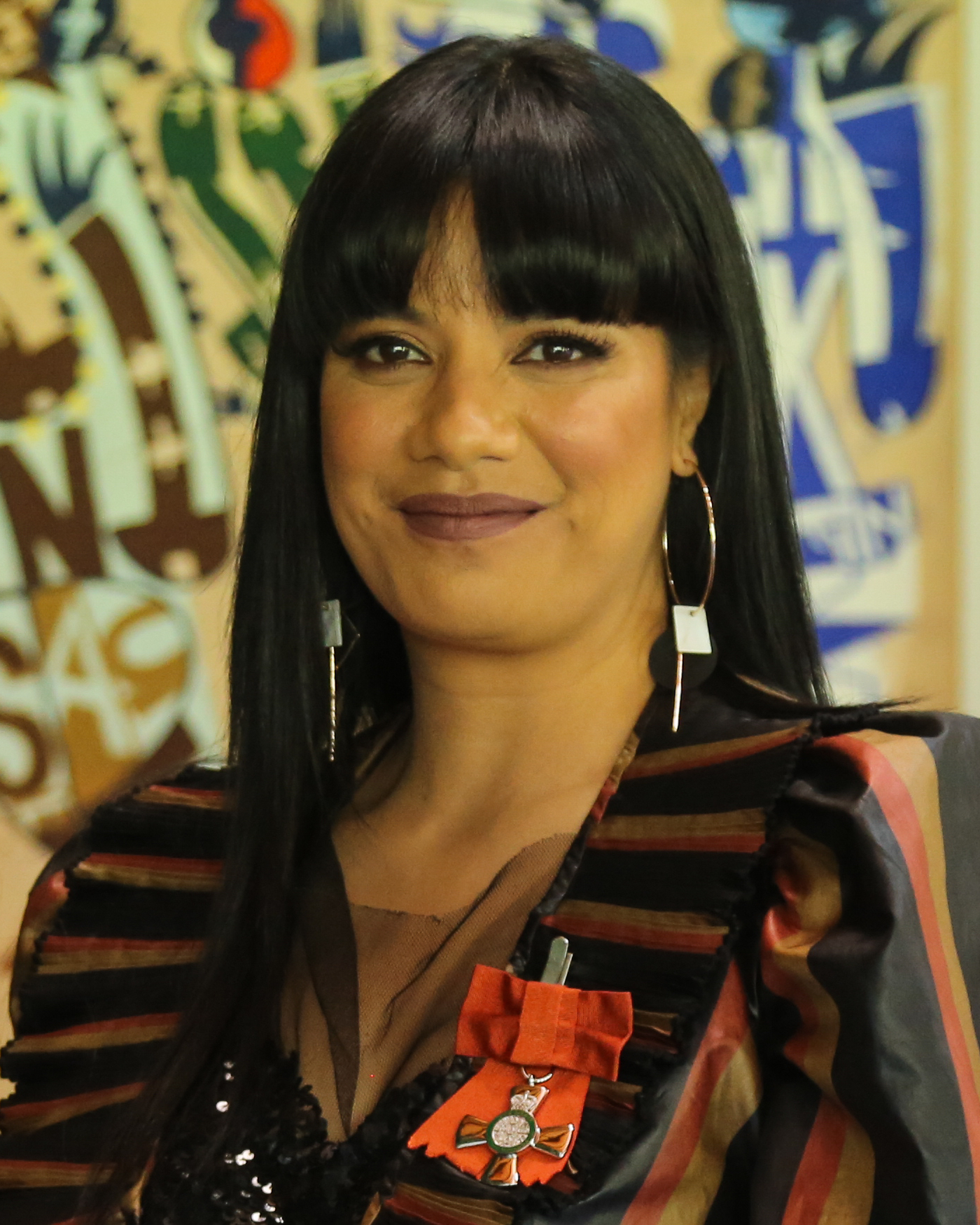
Ladi6

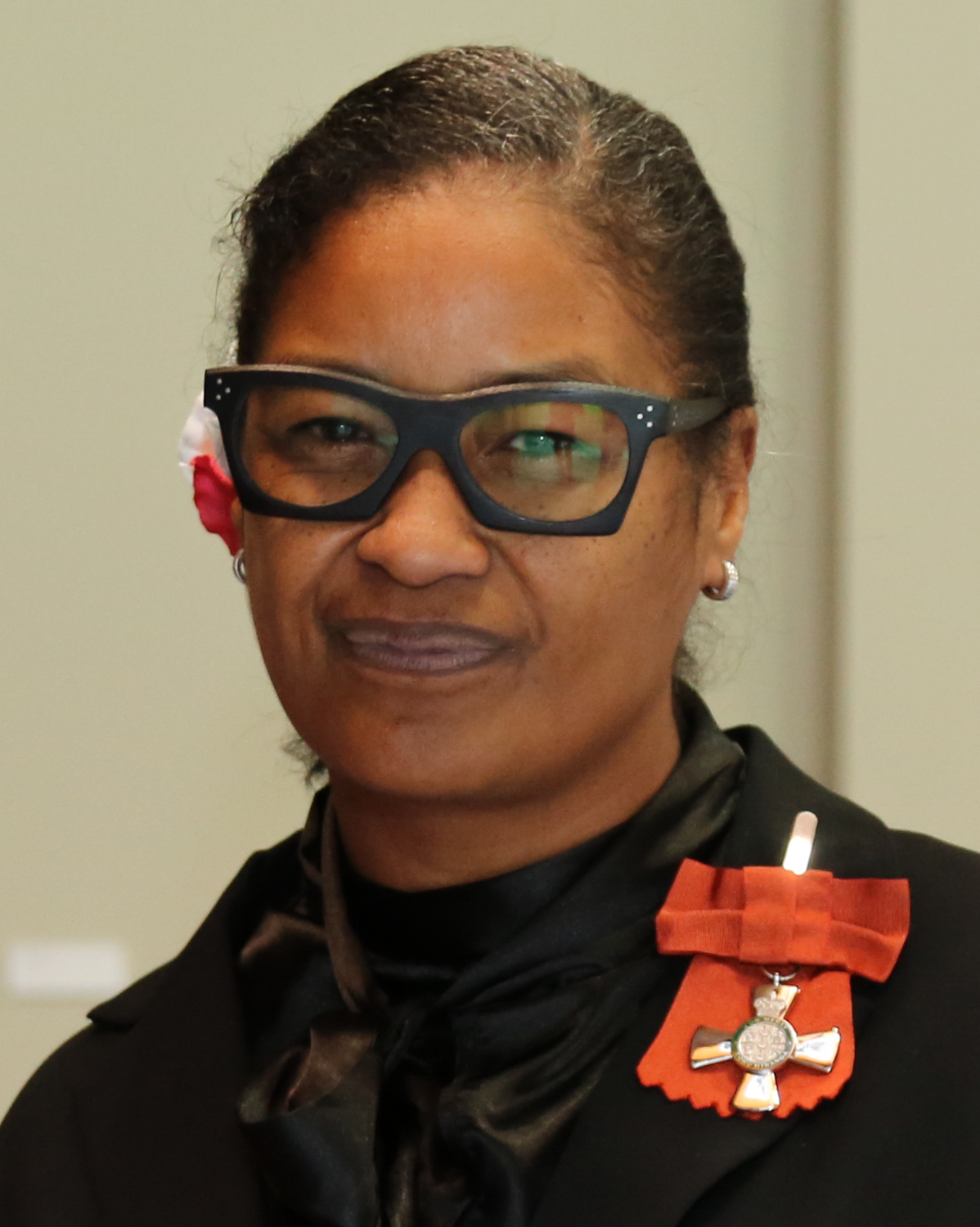
Teremoana Rapley

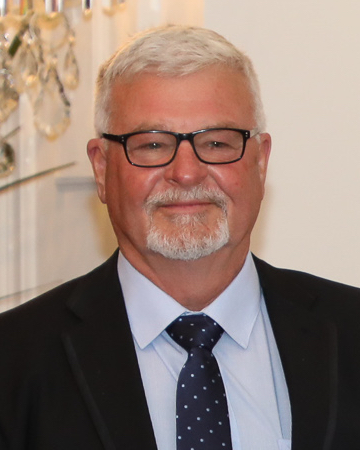
Robin Simmons

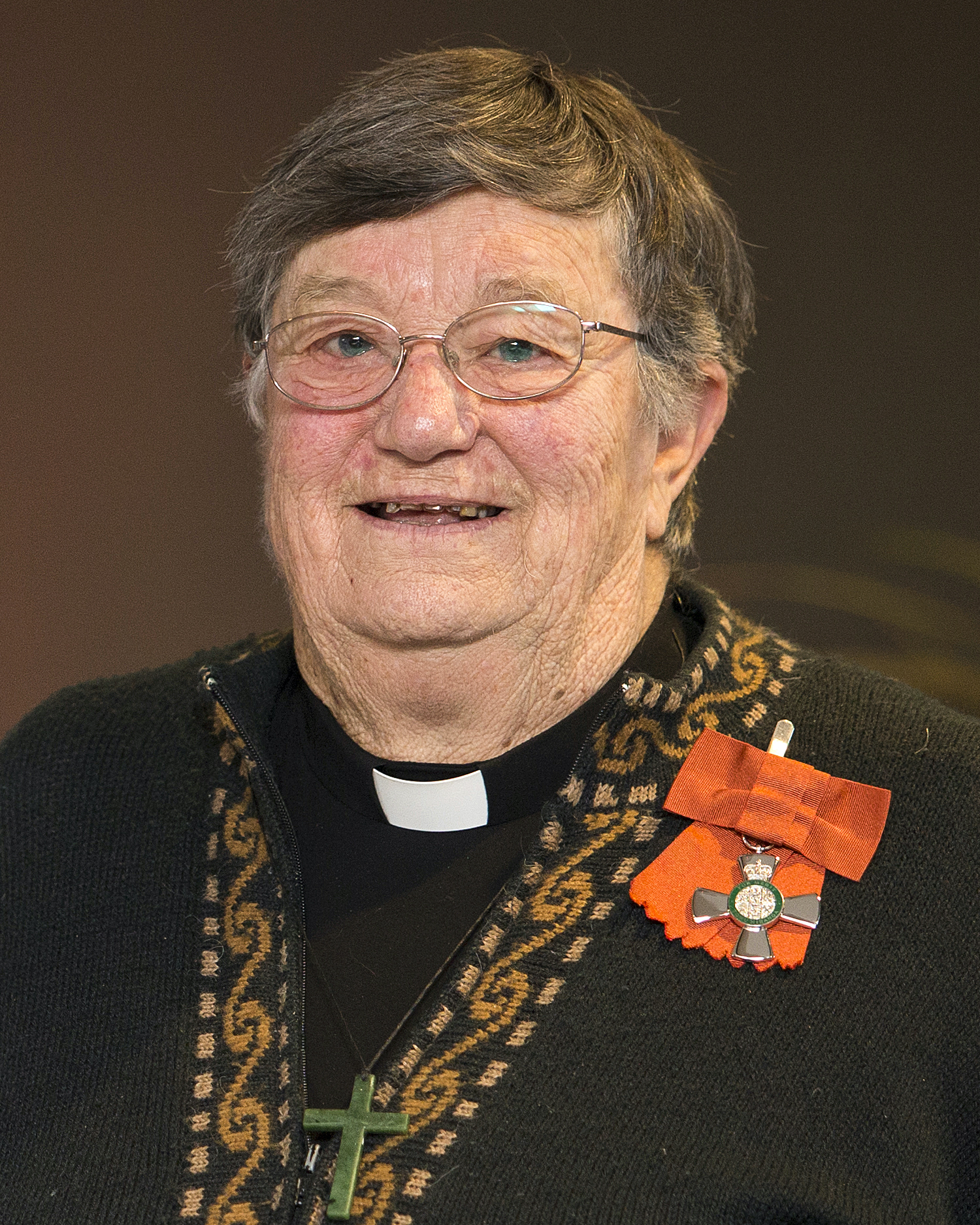
Janice Stead

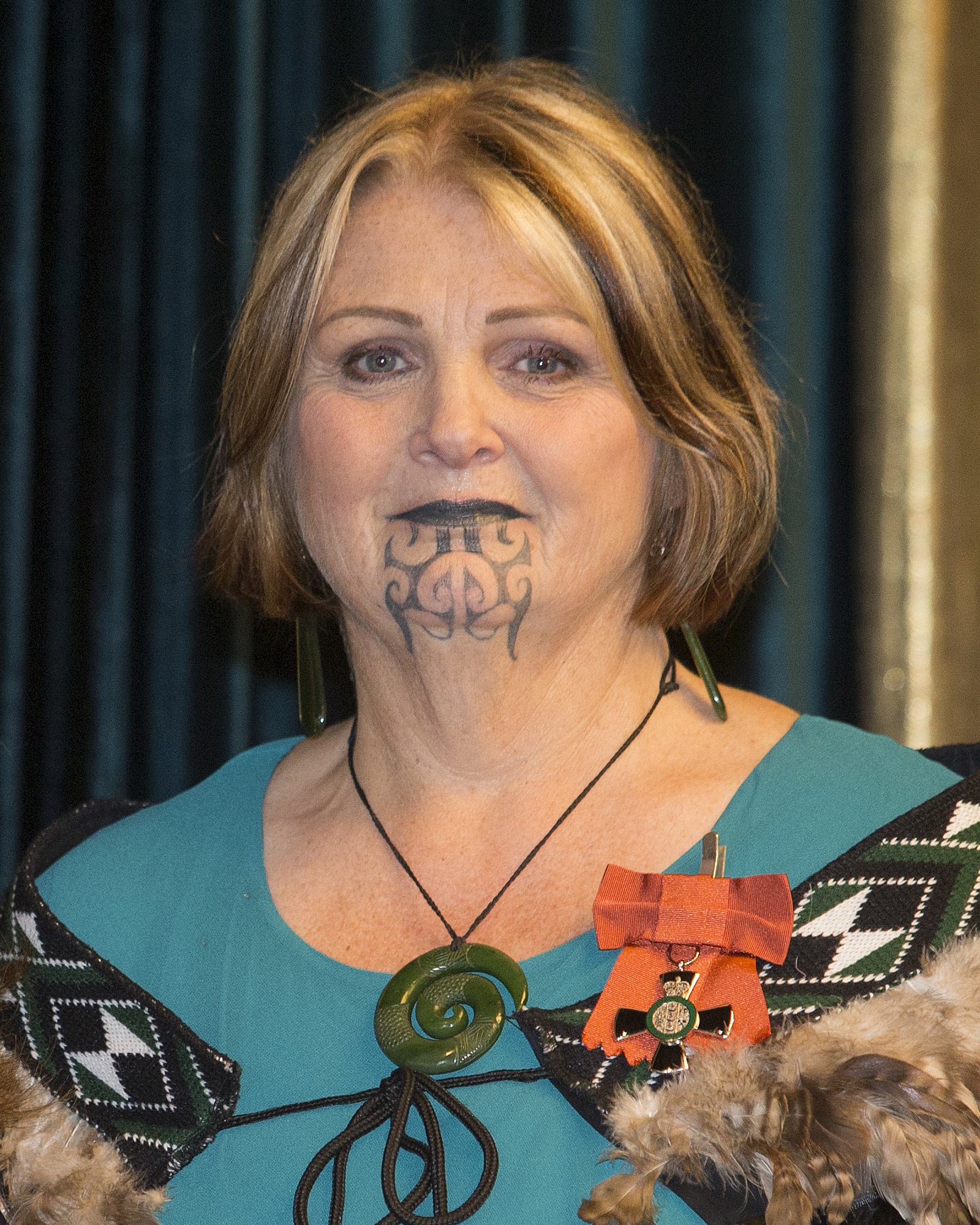
Mairehe Tankersley

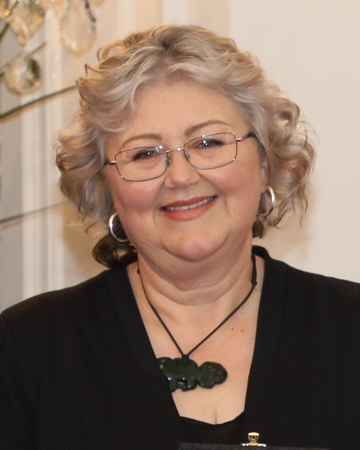
Tracey Wright‑Tawha

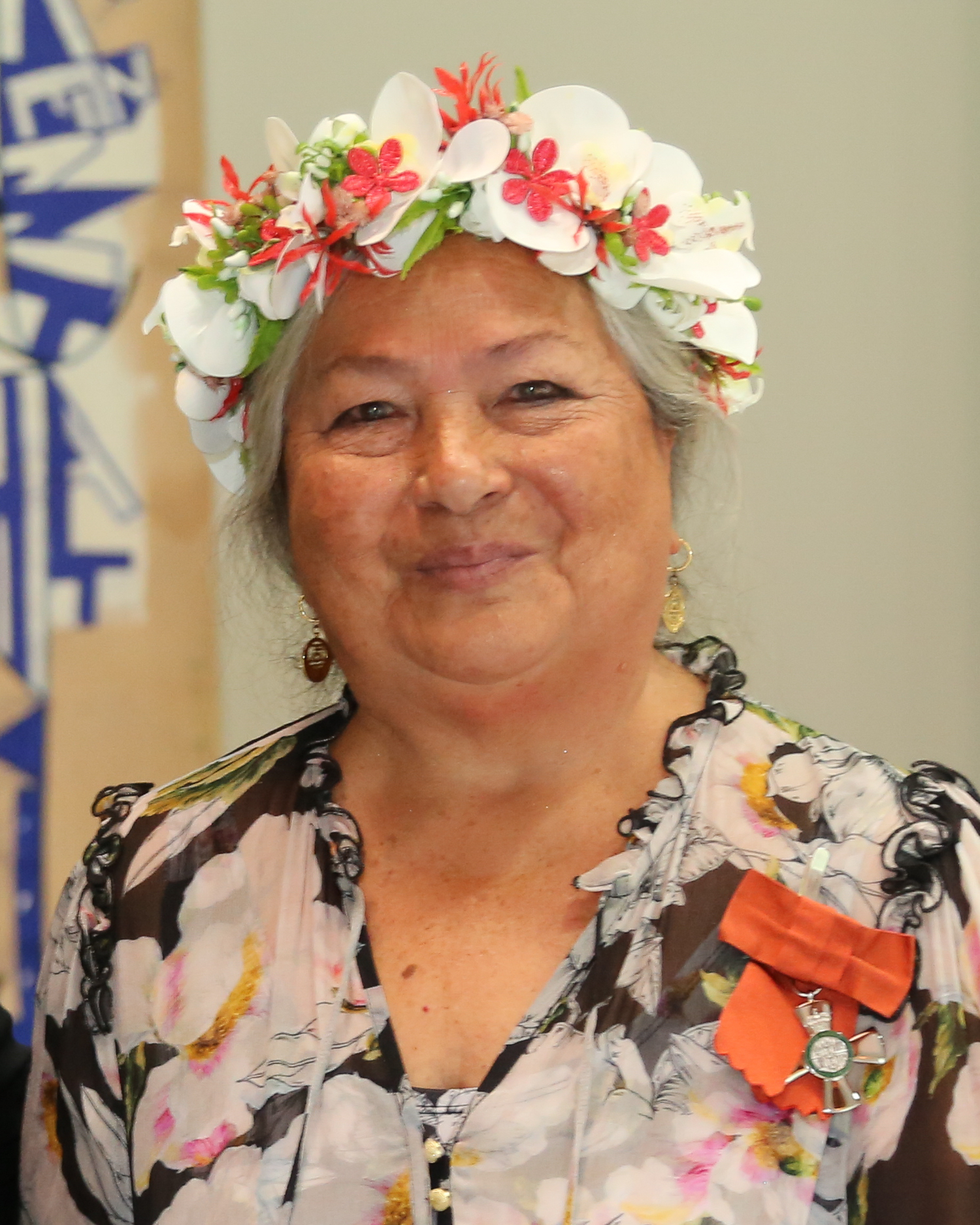
Louisa Humphry

== Companion of the Queen's Service Order (QSO) ==
- The Honourable Ruth Suzanne Dyson – of Redcliffs. For services as a member of Parliament and to people with disabilities.
- Michelle Susan Grant – of Elgin. For services to victims of sexual violence.
- David Alan Matthews – of Cashmere. For services to people with disabilities.
- Peter Anthony Miskimmin – of Eastbourne. For services to sports governance and public service.
- Sarah Ann Stuart-Black – of Wellington. For services to emergency management.
- Heather Leigh Tanguay – of Glen Eden. For services to local government and the community.
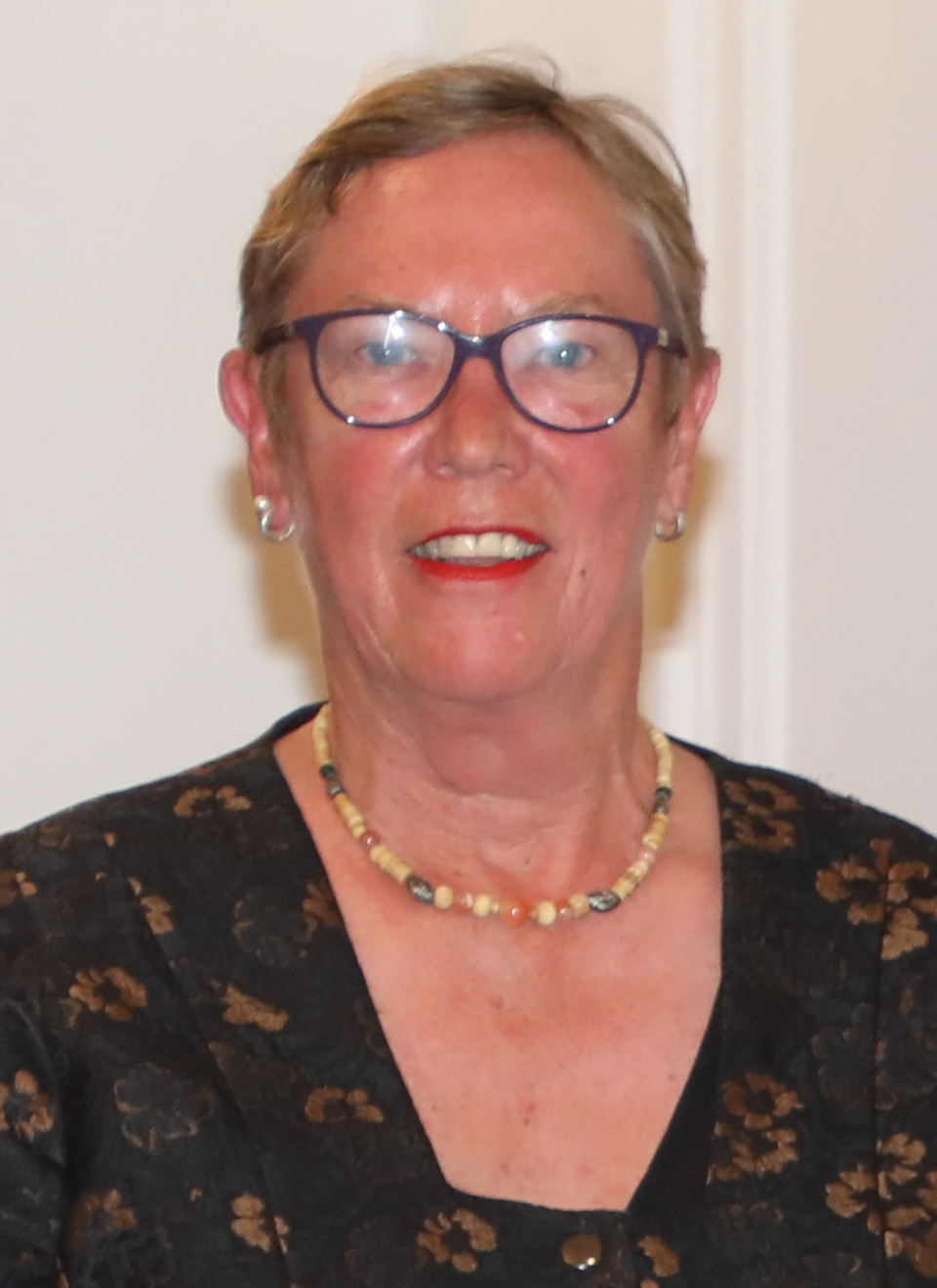
Ruth Dyson

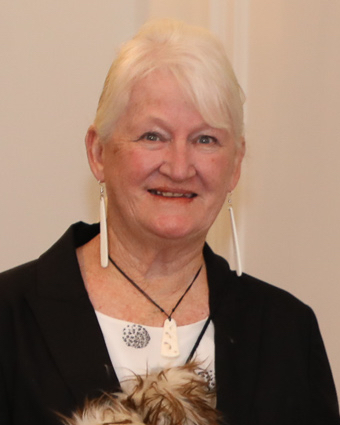
Michelle Grant

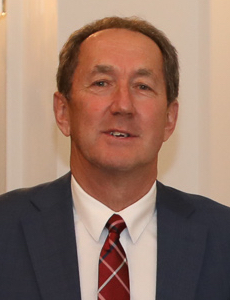
Peter Miskimmin

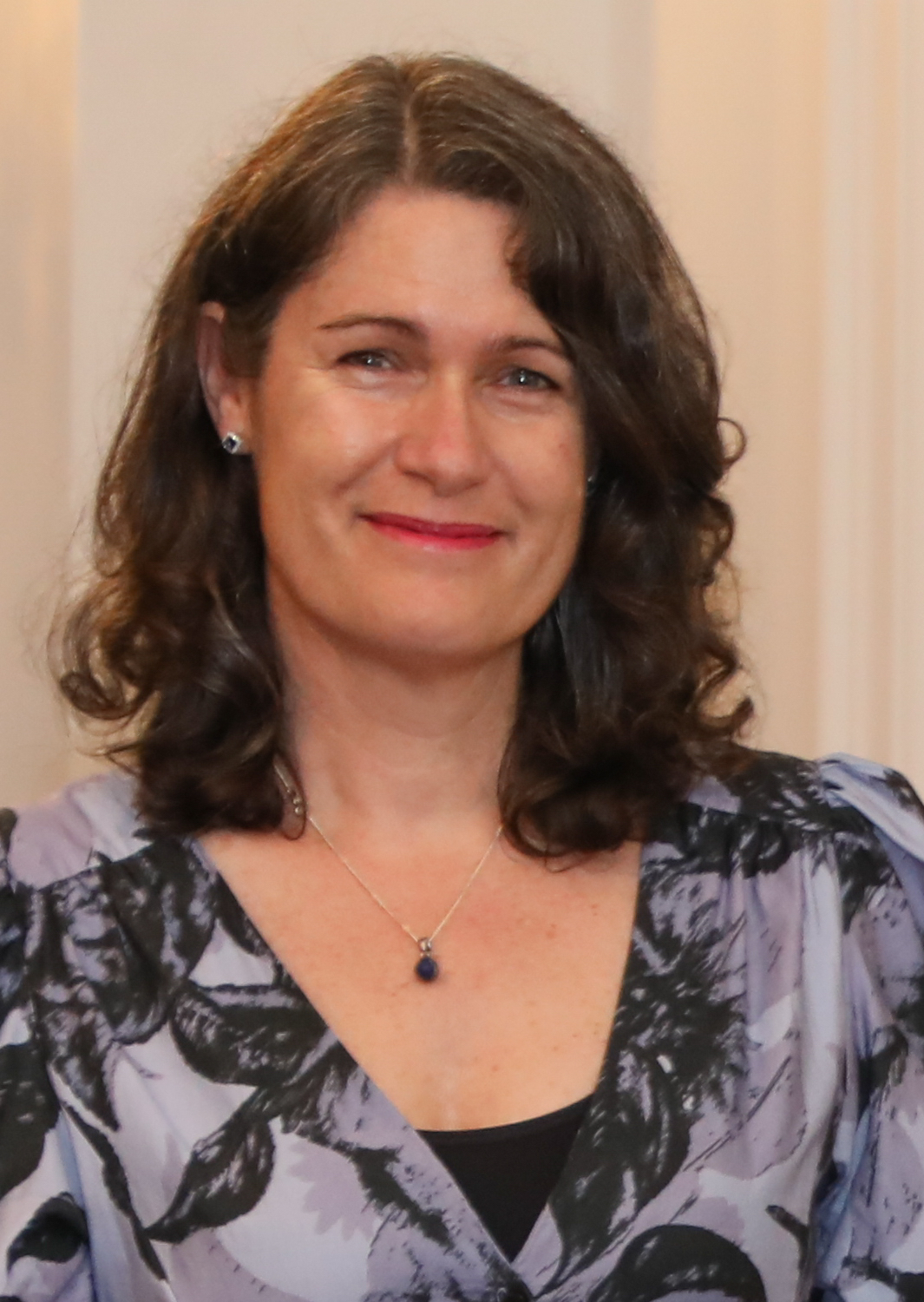
Sarah Stuart-Black

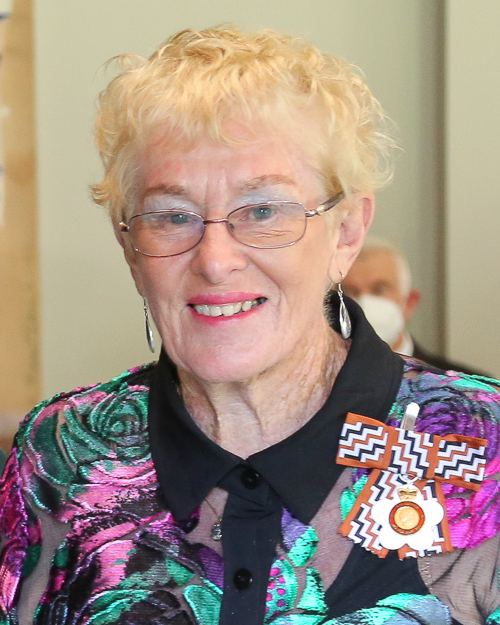
Heather Tanguay

== Queen's Service Medal (QSM) ==
- Carolyn Anne Amos JP – of Kenepuru. For services to the community.
- Graeme Rodney Baker – of Whanganui East. For services to the community.
- Grant Andrew Aaron Baker – of Aotea. For services to cricket and the community.
- Jacquetta Bell – of Nelson. For services to the arts and the community.
- Dr Alastair Hartley Blackie JP – of Kaiapoi. For services to dentistry and local government.
- Suzanne Blakely – of Redcliffs. For services to refugees and ESOL education.
- Bruce Edwin Bold – of Maoribank. For services to the community.
- Sergeant Andrew George Brooke – of Hokowhitu. For services to Search and Rescue.
- Barbara Michelle Cameron – of Feilding. For services to the community and local government.
- Charles Edwin Campbell – of Caversham. For services to the performing arts.
- Grant Kenneth Conaghan – of Whangārei. For services to Search and Rescue.
- Kevin Graham Curtis – of Matamata. For services to Fire and Emergency New Zealand and the community.
- Diana Lois Dobson – of Blenheim. For services to wildlife conservation.
- Sonia Elizabeth Edwards – of Ōpōtiki. For services to historical research and the community.
- Carol Annette Frost – of Caversham. For services to the homeless and prisoner rehabilitation.
- Dr Derek Clifton Gibbons – of Dargaville. For services to health.
- Robert MacGregor Greenfield – of Wilton. For services to college football.
- Neville Henry Jacobsen – of Dannevirke. For services to Fire and Emergency New Zealand and the community.
- Gary Irving Lang – of Kaiapoi South. For services to Special Olympics and the community.
- Heather Dorothy Lear – of Remuera. For services to inclusive education.
- Ian Christopher Leigh-Mackenzie JP – of Opononi. For services to the community.
- Judith Elaine Livingston – of Te Hapara. For services to music and the community.
- Ronal Arthur Luxton JP – of Temuka. For services to health and the community.
- Habib Ullah Marwat – of Woolston. For services to Muslim and ethnic communities.
- Yvonne Mavis Officer – of Otatara. For services to victim support.
- Mila Kim Oh – of West Harbour. For services to Korean culture and New Zealand–Republic of Korea relations.
- Te Rehia Teresa Fay Papesch – of Dinsdale. For services to the community and public service.
- Reverend Victor Siaosi Pouesi – of Māngere East. For services to the Samoan community.
- Anita Ruth Prime – of Whitianga. For services to youth and the community.
- Alan John Reekie – of Forrest Hill. For services to performing arts governance.
- Diana Helen Reid – of Darfield. For services to cancer support.
- Jannette Leah Riley – of Motueka. For services to cancer support and fundraising.
- Yvonne Esther Roberts – of Picton. For services to quilting and patchwork craft.
- Benita Jane Robinson – of Stokes Valley. For services to the community.
- John Robert Sandison JP – of Fairy Springs. For services to Fire and Emergency New Zealand and the community.
- Taualoa Lalopua Sanele – of Maupuia. For services to the union movement and Samoan community.
- Gregory John Loisel Shelton – of Tolaga Bay. For services to the community.
- Elizabeth Margaret Steel – of Heriot. For services to the community.
- Vanessa Ann Taylor – of Stokes Valley. For services to bowls and the community.
- Kenneth Terrance Trinder – of New Plymouth. For services to Māori and the community.
- Paul Eric Tyson – of Mornington. For services to sport and the community.
- Rachael Anne Utumapu – of New Plymouth. For services to Fire and Emergency New Zealand and people with cancer.
- Kim Heather Ward – of Paremoremo. For services to the community.
- Janice Valida White – of Huntington. For services to seniors and people with disabilities.
- Gordon Wu – of Miramar. For services to the Chinese community
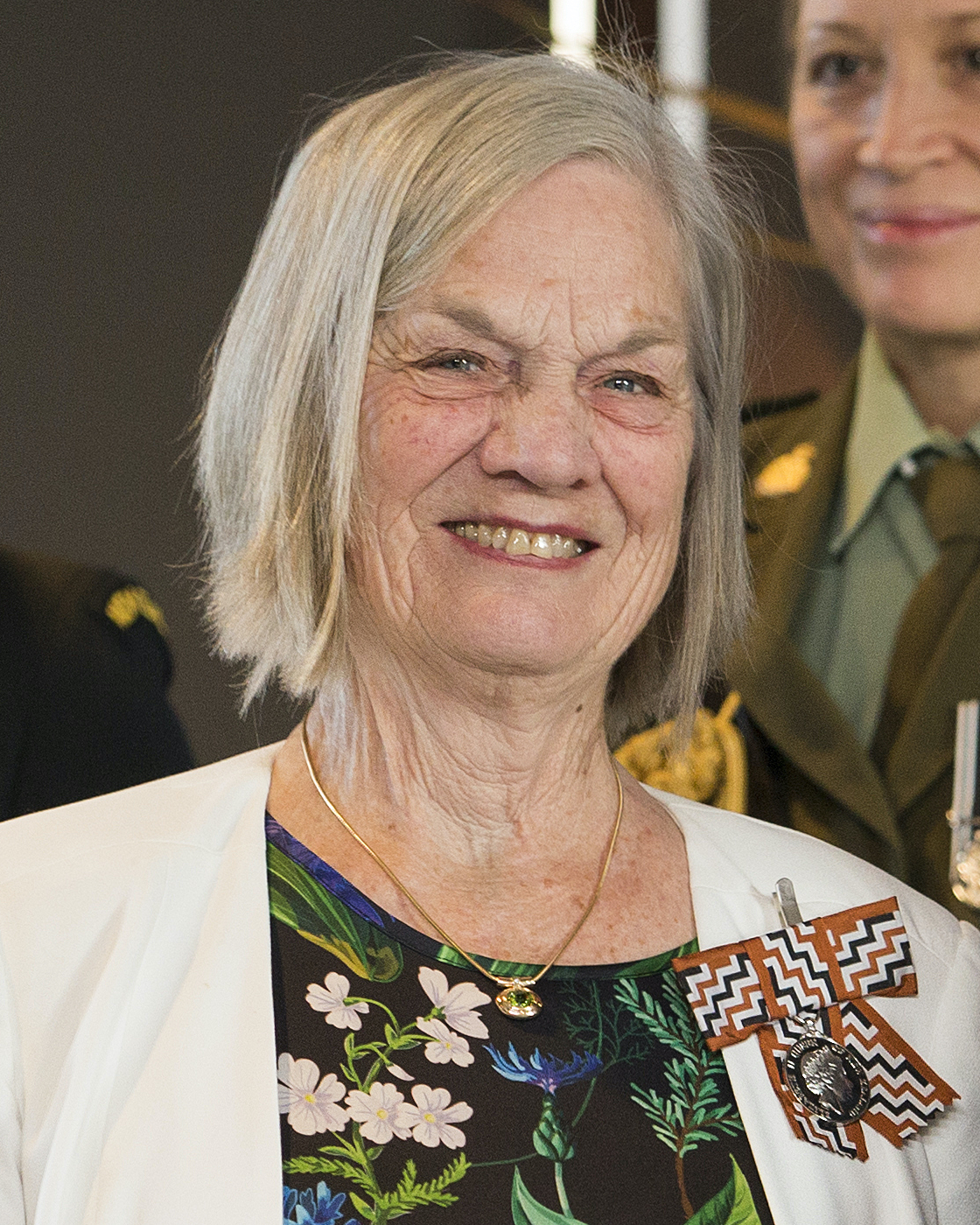
Suzanne Blakely

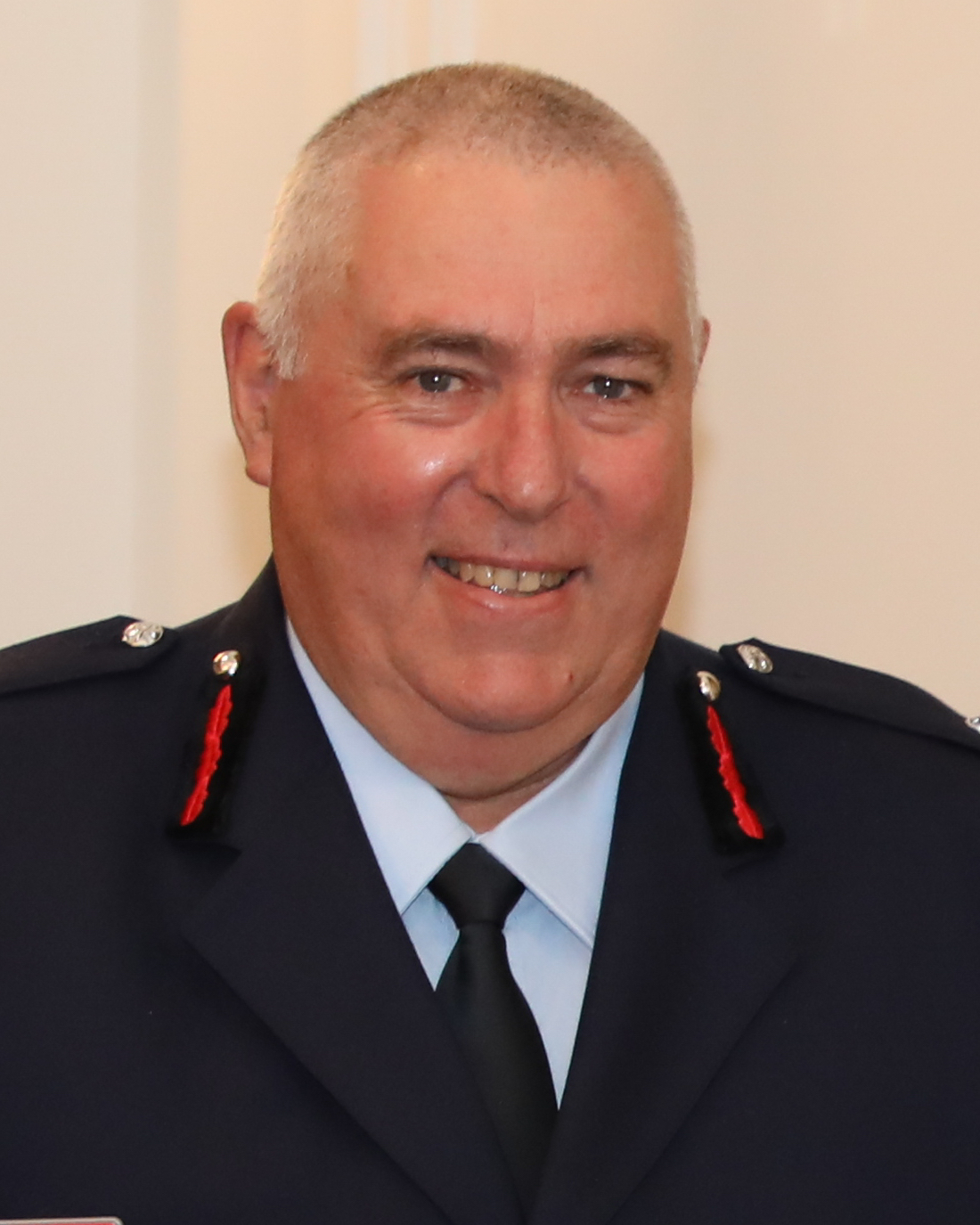
Kevin Curtis

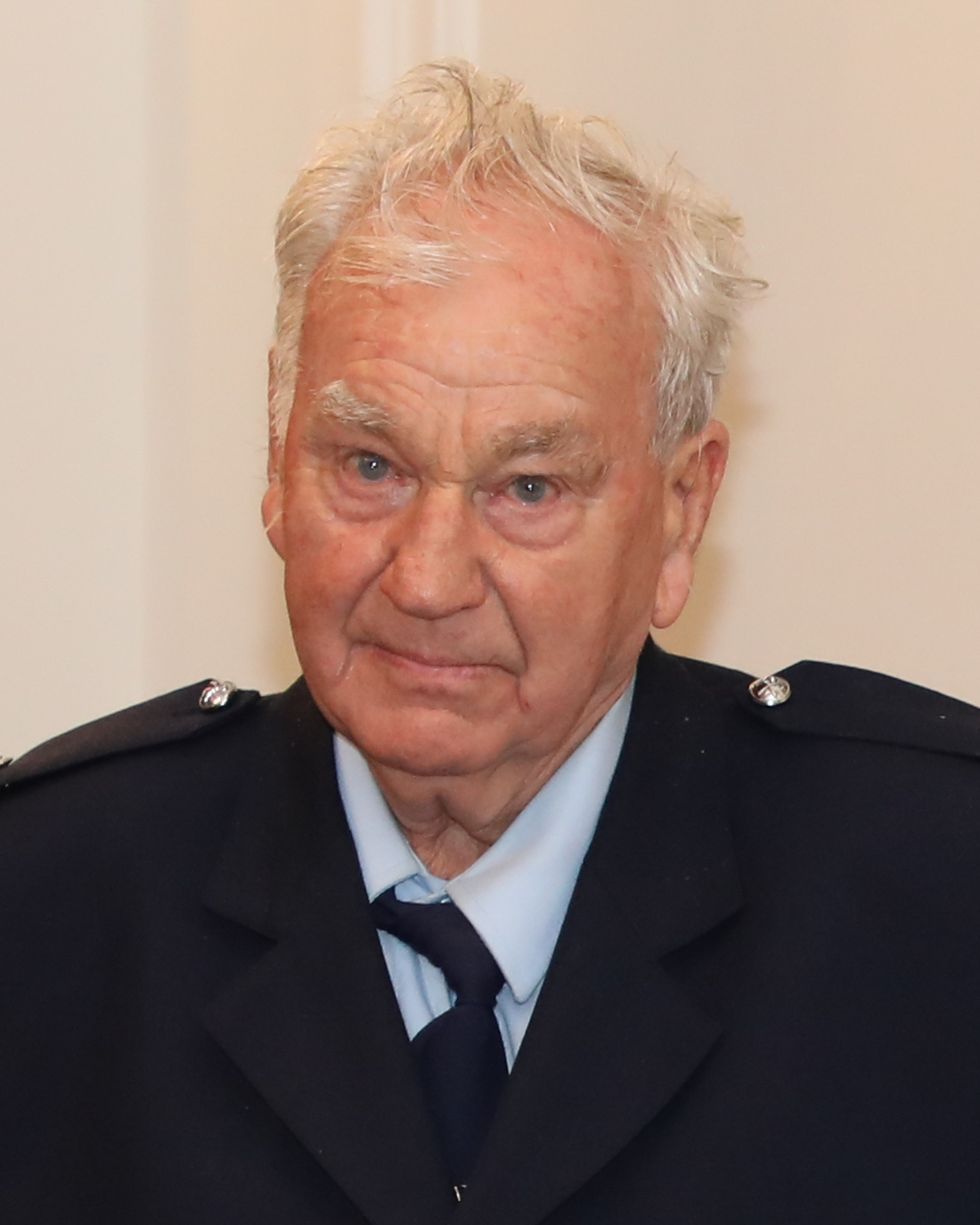
Neville Jacobsen

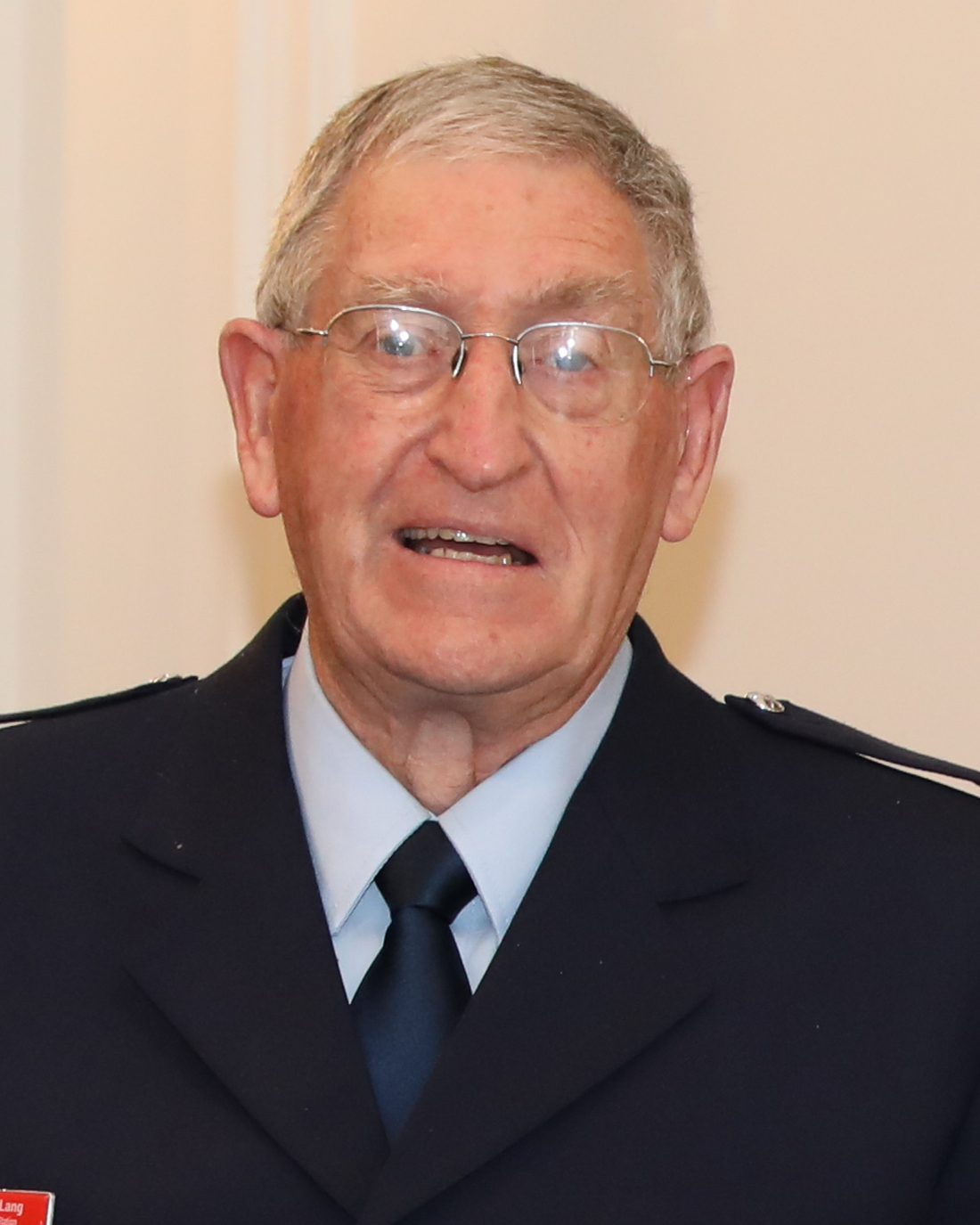
Gary Lang

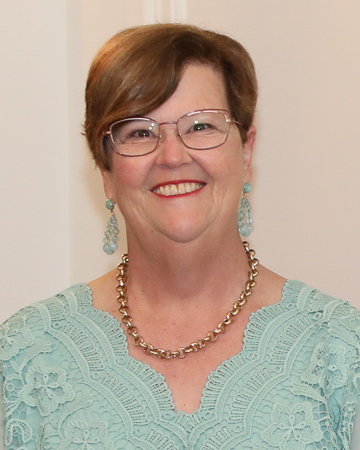
Judy Livingston

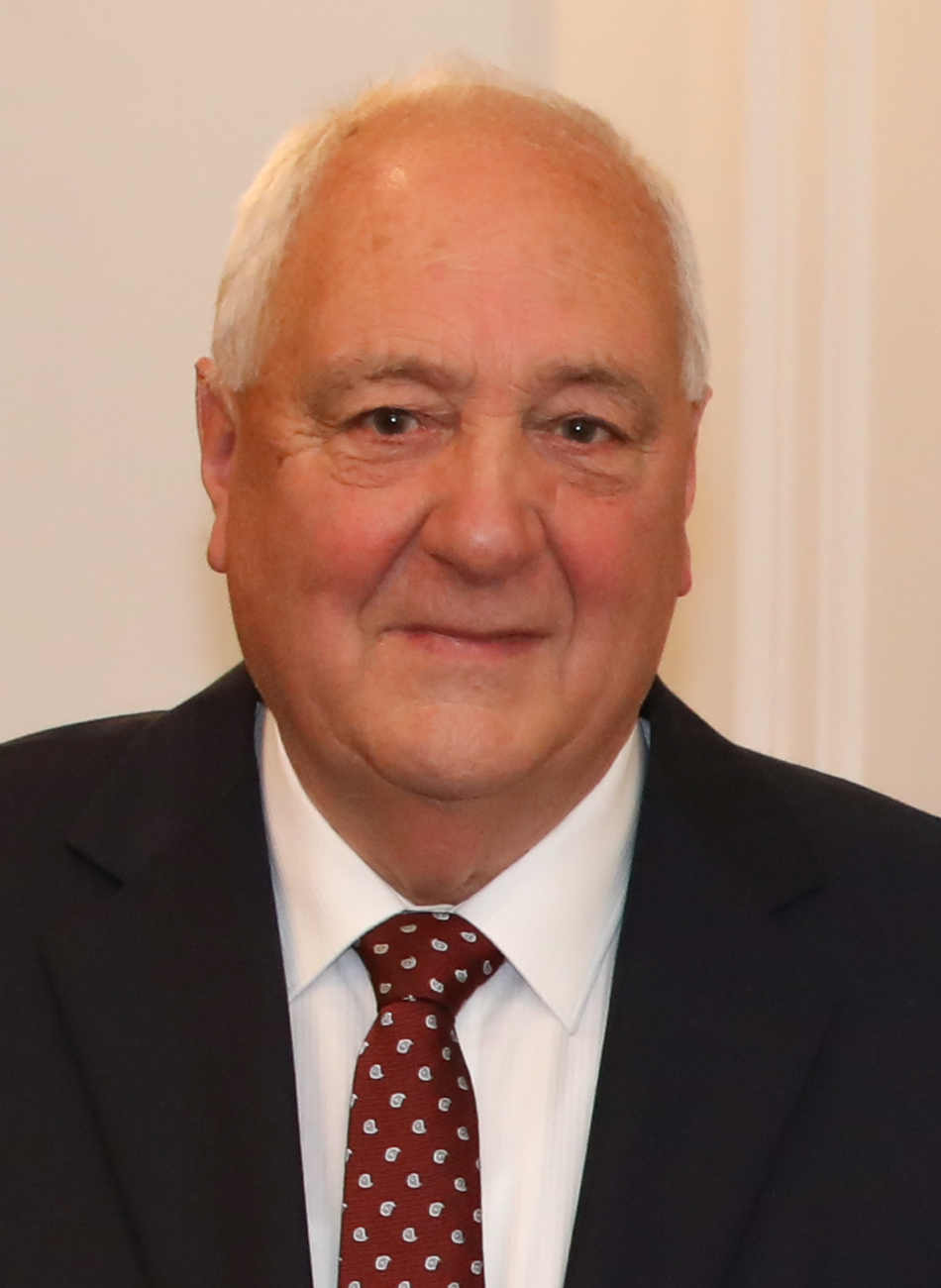
Ron Luxton

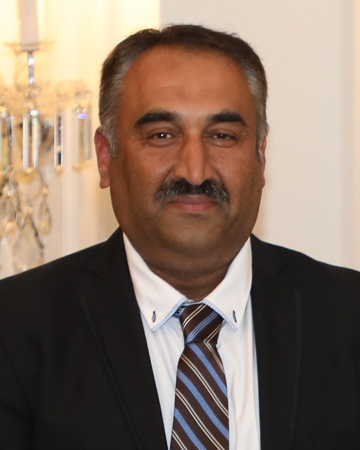
Habib Marwat

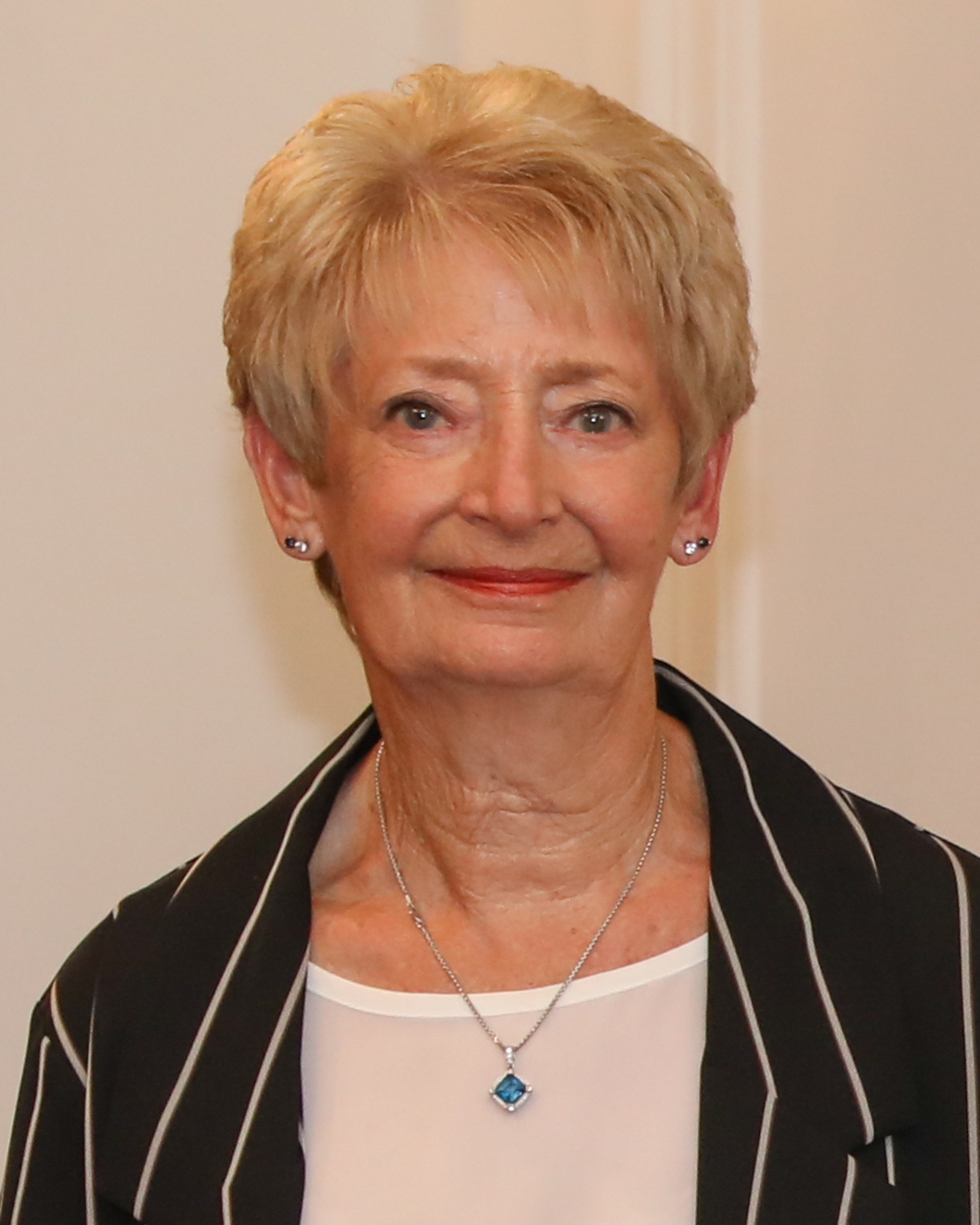
Yvonne Officer

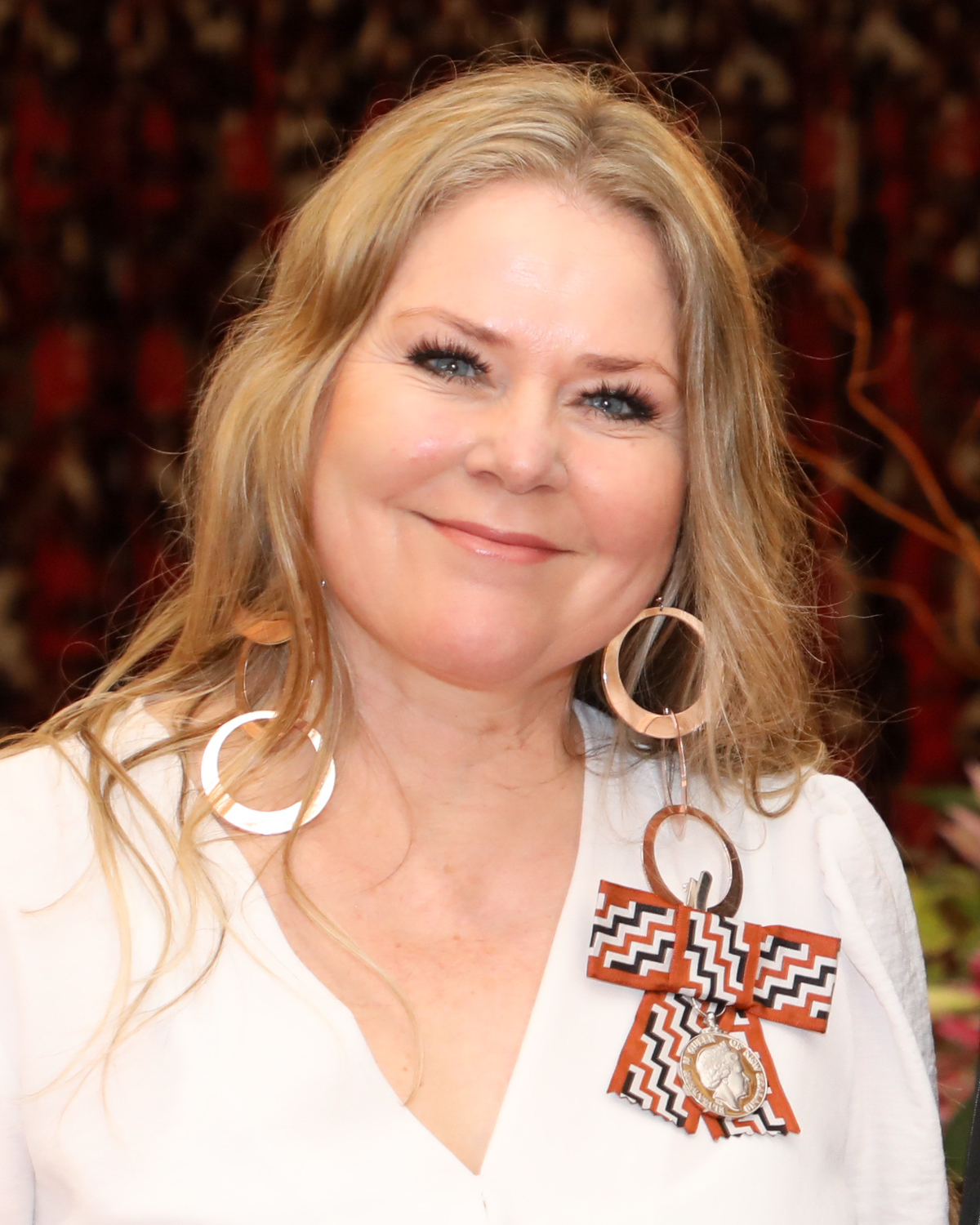
Anita Prime

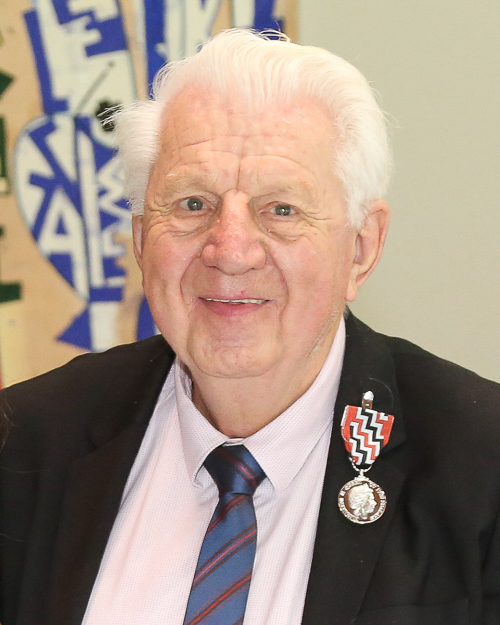
Alan Reekie

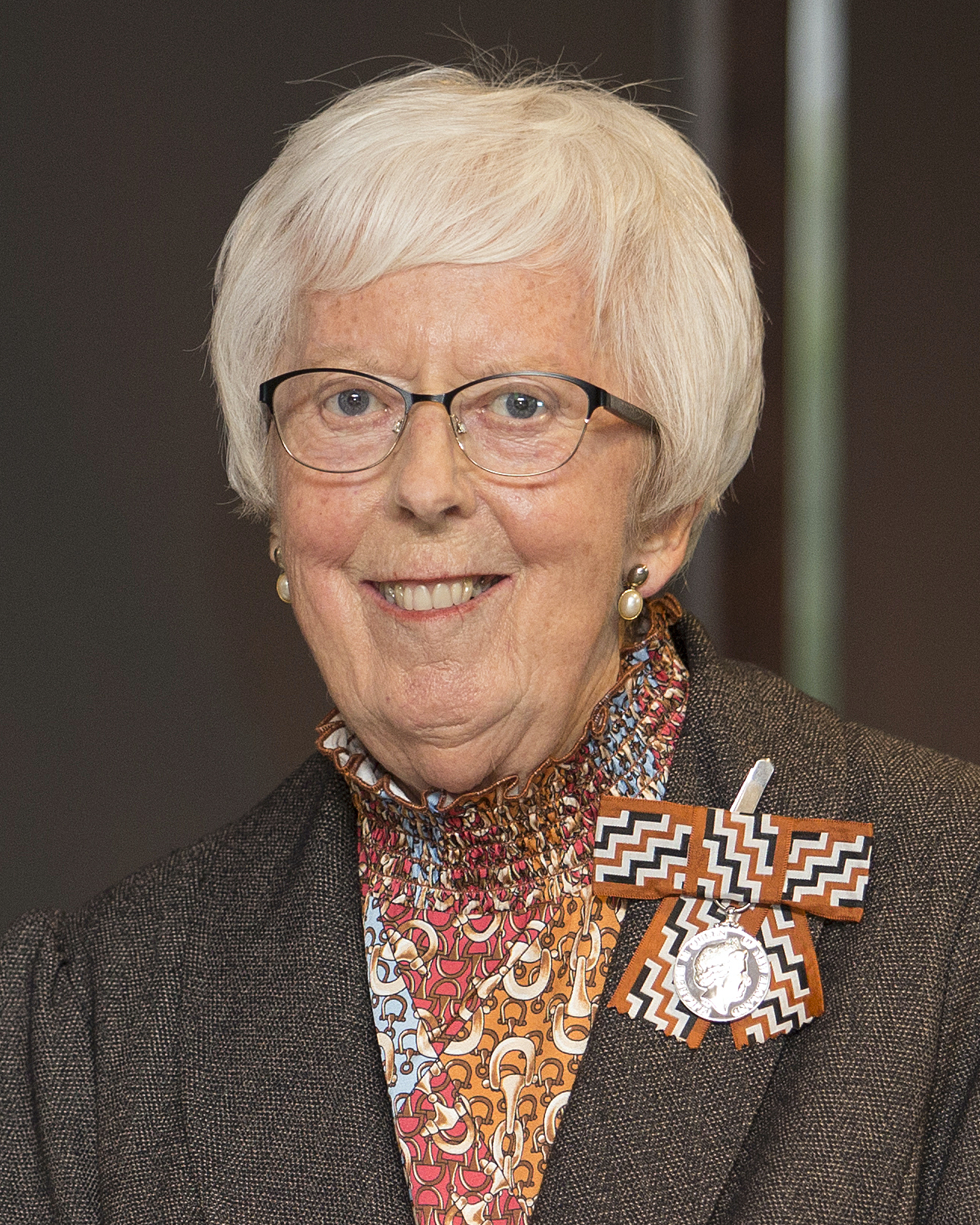
Diana Reid

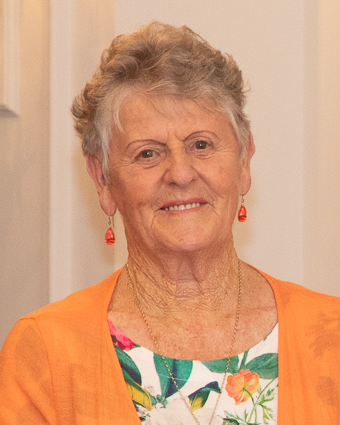
Jan Riley

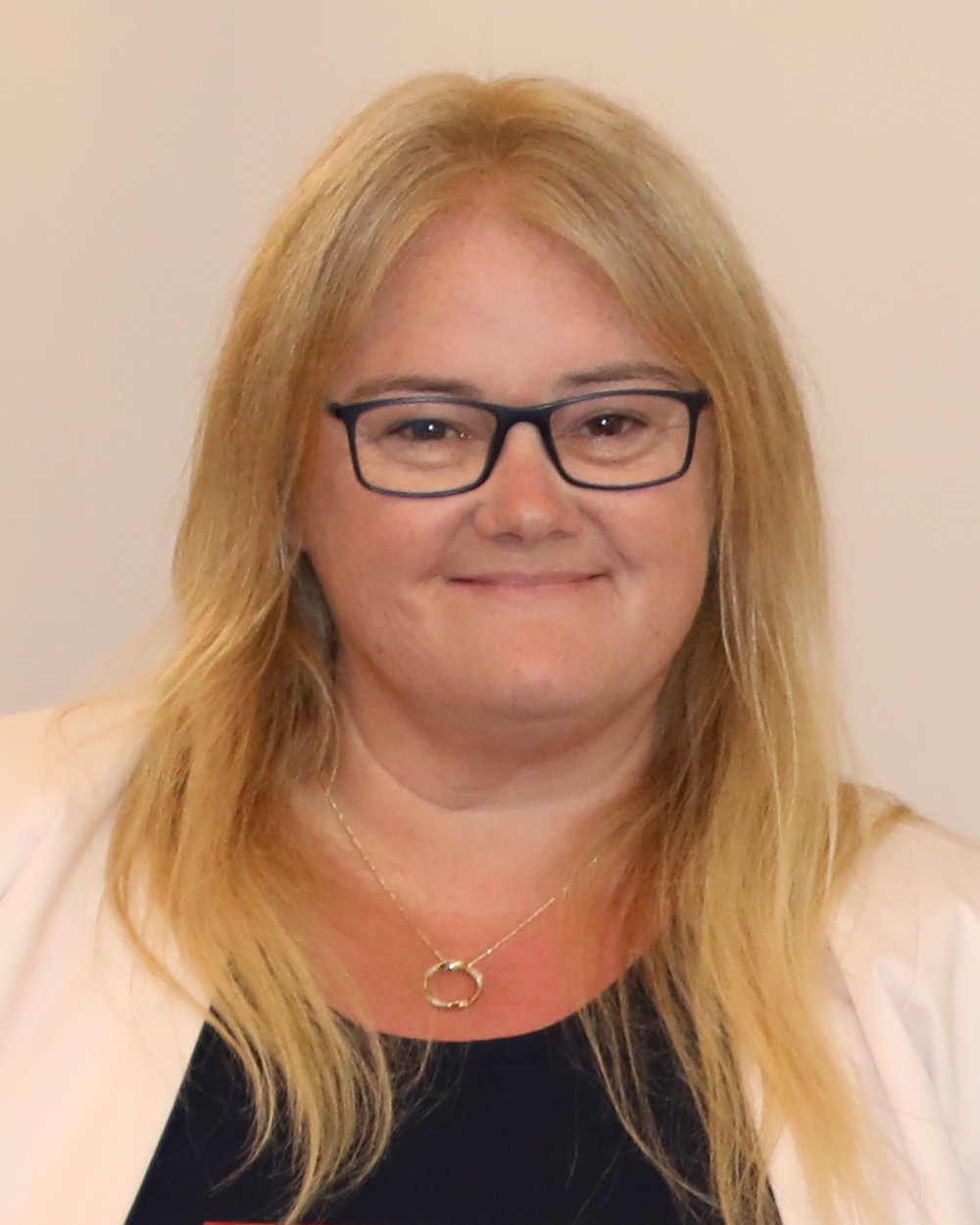
Benita Robinson

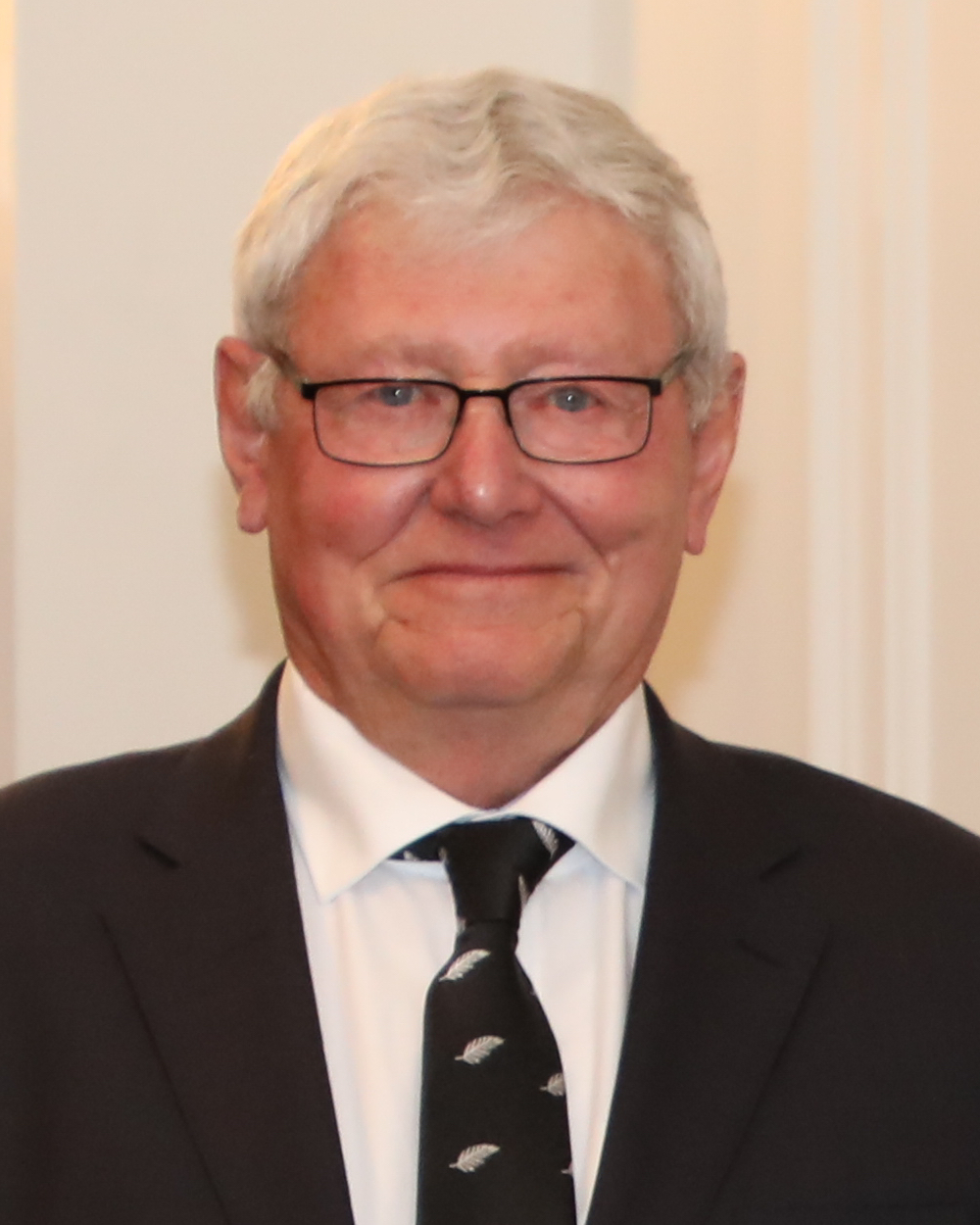
John Sandison

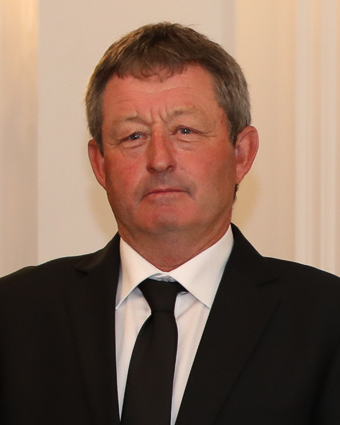
Greg Shelton

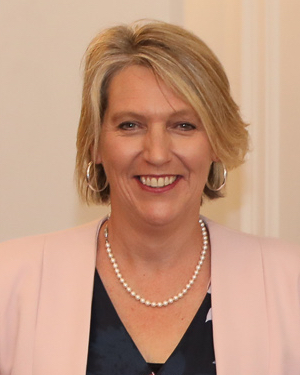
Vanessa Taylor

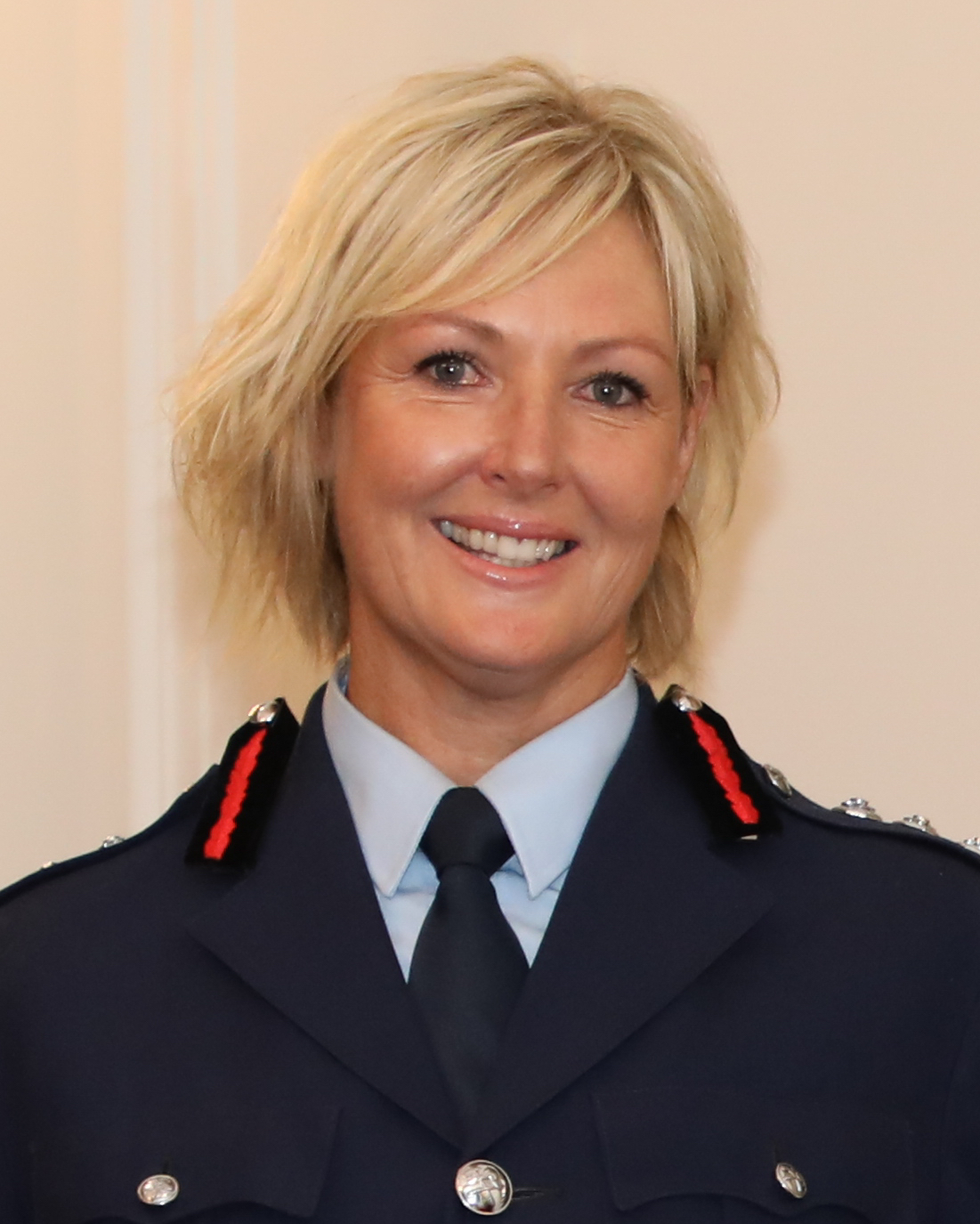
Rachael Utumapu

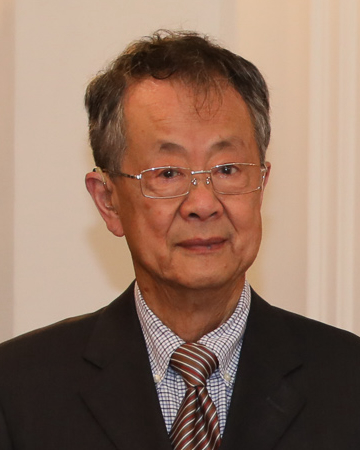
Gordon Wu

== New Zealand Distinguished Service Decoration (DSD) ==
- Captain Matthew Gordon Carey – of Silverstream. For services to the New Zealand Defence Force. (Note: Captain Matthew Carey's name was initially withheld for security reasons, being listed only as Serviceman M, but was published on 10 March 2023 in the New Zealand Gazette.)
- Lieutenant Colonel Adam John Modd GM – of Upper Hutt. For services to the New Zealand Defence Force.
