= Graham Philip =

New Zealand conspiracy theorist

Graham John Philip (born 1960) is a New Zealand conspiracy theorist and convicted criminal. He was the first person in New Zealand history charged with sabotage, after he attacked New Zealand's electrical grid in an attempt to cut power to the entire North Island in 2021.

== Early life ==
Philip was born in Hackney, London in 1960. While he was young, the family moved to Petone in Wellington, New Zealand, when his father got a job there. Philip described his father as emotionally manipulative towards him and his brother David. Philip returned to London in his twenties, working for Dolby as a sound engineer. In May 1988, David, having previously escaped a mental health facility, stabbed fellow vagrant Kyung Eup Lee to death in Melbourne during an argument over squatting. David then dismembered Lee's body, cooked and ate his flesh, and spread other body parts around. Philip visited David in prison after complying with a vaccine requirement. He eventually moved back to New Zealand, living in Hāwera, Rotorua where he worked as a high school teacher, and Taupō where he worked at a computer repair shop.

== Conspiracy theories and crimes ==
Philip was radicalised online during the COVID-19 pandemic. He supported Donald Trump's false claims of election fraud in the 2020 United States presidential election and QAnon-related conspiracy theories. Philip became an anti-vaccination activist and COVID-19 conspiracy theorist, expressing "paranoid and apocalyptic views" and gaining hundreds of followers online. He claimed that the COVID-19 vaccine was designed by a Satanic cabal to cause mass death and depopulate the world. He believed society would soon collapse and got involved in the prepping community, where he instructed people how to make explosives.

Philip took part in stunts such as wearing a snorkel inside stores to protest mask mandates and setting up a table on a street in Taupō with a sign saying "Change my mind: Covid-19 is fake", inspired by Steven Crowder. He self-published several books, including Star Wars fan fiction, many of which contained vaccine conspiracy plots in his effort to "red pill" readers. On his Gab account and his Telegram radio show, he called for military tribunals to sentence people to death for war crimes and treason, including Prime Minister Jacinda Ardern, all other members of the New Zealand Parliament, and various journalists, academics, and health bureaucrats.

After an altercation when Philip was denied entry to a bank, a police officer visited his home on 29 September 2021. Philip took a photo of the officer's badge number and posted it online with threats to "make him pay". He also posted photos of electrical substations and transformers, implying to his followers that they should use tools to attack them, and in his Telegram radio show spoke of his plans to do so himself. Between 6 November and 27 November, Philip carried out attacks on Transpower New Zealand infrastructure, with one attack resulting in a fire. He caused an estimated $1.25 million in damages.

=== Arrest ===
Philip was arrested at his home in Acacia Bay on 8 December 2021. His vehicle and electronic devices were taken by police, and Philip was sent to Spring Hill Corrections Facility. His name and the details of his offending were subject to a suppression order. His wife Marta and fellow conspiracy theorists seized on the lack of details, portraying him as a political prisoner and campaigning for his release, including fundraising for his legal fees and protesting outside of courthouses. Name suppression was lifted in July 2022, though his name had been spread through social media since at least February, and far-right conspiracy platform Counterspin Media had published an interview with Marta in May.

Philip was initially charged with seven counts of wilful damage, but this was upgraded to sabotage in early 2022. He was also charged with one count of unlawfully entering agricultural land. After previously entering a not guilty plea, he changed his plea to guilty for all charges on 4 November 2022. On 1 December 2022, Philip was sentenced to three years and one month in prison, and the suppression order partly lapsed, publicly revealing for the first time what he had targeted.

Philip also faced a separate $300 charge for breaching COVID-19 lockdown laws at a protest in Taupō on 31 August 2021. He went to trial on 19 December 2022 and represented himself, having pleaded not guilty. He cited Magna Carta in his defence, a tactic common in the sovereign citizen movement. The infringement notice was upheld, but the charge was waived as Philip is in prison and unable to pay.

Philip was denied parole in January 2023, due to not having had a psychological assessment, having no release plan, and being seen as an undue risk to the community by showing no remorse.

Philip was released from prison on 8 January 2025.

== Personal life ==
Philip is married to Marta, a Brazilian woman, with whom he has three children. He is a devout Christian with fundamentalist views, having turned to the faith at the age of 19. He credited Christianity for him not turning out like his brother, and claimed it cured him of schizophrenia.
