= Taupō Central =

Central business district of Taupō, New Zealand

- Suburb
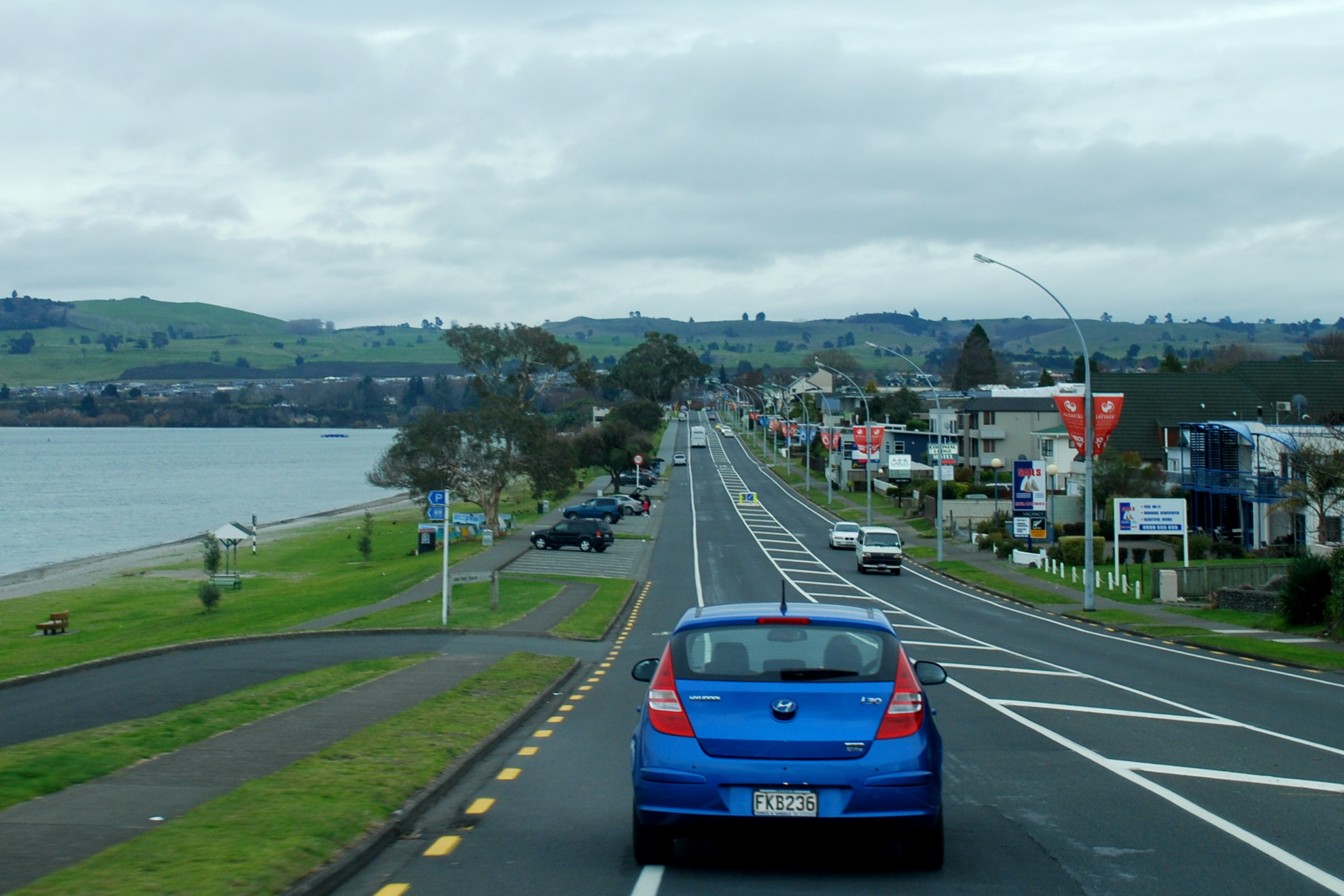
- Lake Terrace
- Interactive map of Taupō Central
- Coordinates: 38.687533°S 176.069315°E
- Country: New Zealand
- City: Taupō
- Local authority: Taupō District Council
- Electoral ward: Taupō General Ward

Area
  - Land: 245 ha (610 acres)

Population (June 2025)
  - Total: 3,020
  - Density: 1,230/km^{2} (3,190/sq mi)

| | Rangatira Park | Rotokawa |
| Nukuhau | Taupō Central | Tauhara |
| Acacia Bay | (Lake Taupō) | Hilltop |

Taupō Central is the central suburb and business district of Taupō in the Waikato region of New Zealand's North Island.

An eight-storey hotel was proposed in the CBD in 2018. It would have been Taupō's tallest building. As the council had a three-storey limit at that time, consent required a decision by the Environment Court, which allowed a six-storey building in June 2020. The hotel was still unbuilt as of May 2022.

Taupō Museum is located in Taupō Central. It opened in the 1970s.

== Demographics ==
Taupō Central covers 2.45 km^{2} (0.95 sq mi) and had an estimated population of 3,020 as of June 2025, with a population density of 1,233 people per km^{2}.

Historical population
| Year | Pop. | ±% p.a. |
|---|---|---|
| 2006 | 2,595 | — |
| 2013 | 2,634 | +0.21% |
| 2018 | 2,841 | +1.52% |
| 2023 | 2,850 | +0.06% |

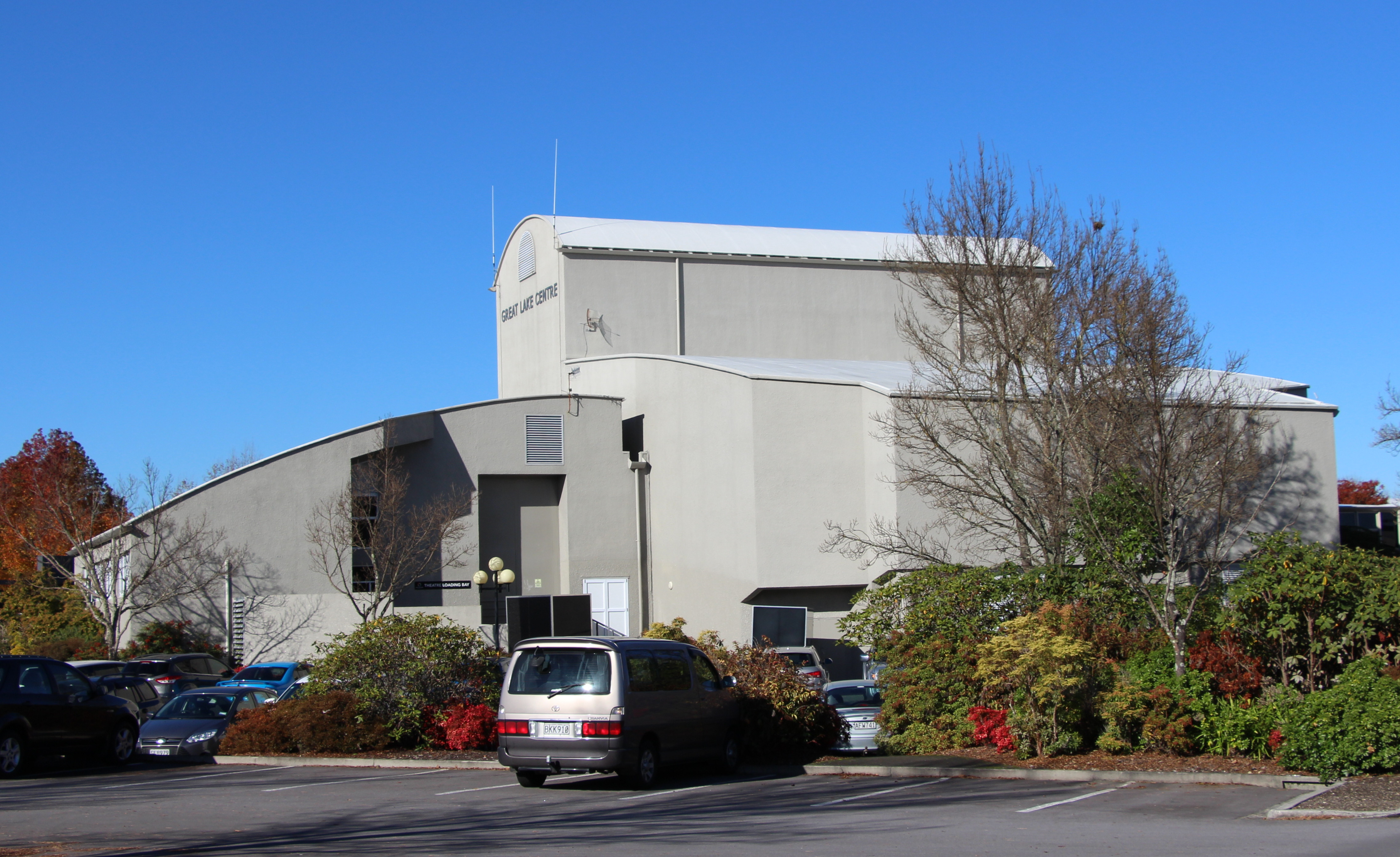
Great Lake Centre

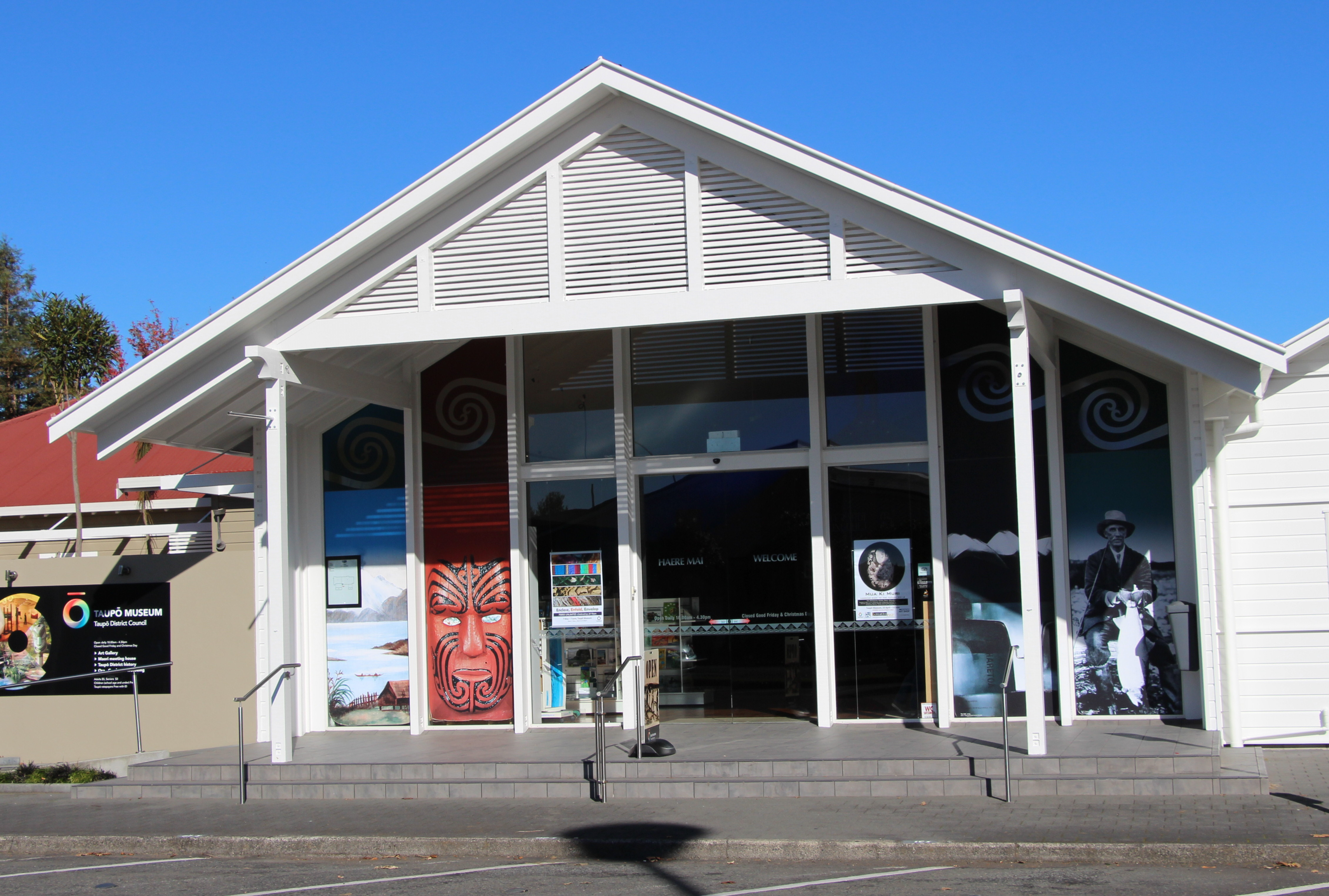
Taupō Museum

Taupō Centre had a population of 2,850 in the 2023 New Zealand census, an increase of 9 people (0.3%) since the 2018 census, and an increase of 216 people (8.2%) since the 2013 census. There were 1,425 males, 1,410 females, and 12 people of other genders in 1,095 dwellings. 2.9% of people identified as LGBTIQ+. The median age was 38.3 years (compared with 38.1 years nationally). There were 492 people (17.3%) aged under 15 years, 552 (19.4%) aged 15 to 29, 1,248 (43.8%) aged 30 to 64, and 555 (19.5%) aged 65 or older.

People could identify as more than one ethnicity. The results were 61.2% European (Pākehā); 33.8% Māori; 6.2% Pasifika; 15.3% Asian; 1.3% Middle Eastern, Latin American and African New Zealanders (MELAA); and 3.6% other, which includes people giving their ethnicity as "New Zealander". English was spoken by 95.6%, Māori by 8.9%, Samoan by 1.2%, and other languages by 12.0%. No language could be spoken by 2.2% (e.g. too young to talk). New Zealand Sign Language was known by 0.6%. The percentage of people born overseas was 25.6, compared with 28.8% nationally.

Religious affiliations were 32.7% Christian, 3.6% Hindu, 0.7% Islam, 2.8% Māori religious beliefs, 1.3% Buddhist, 0.2% New Age, 0.1% Jewish, and 2.7% other religions. People who answered that they had no religion were 49.4%, and 6.7% of people did not answer the census question.

Of those at least 15 years old, 372 (15.8%) people had a bachelor's or higher degree, 1,278 (54.2%) had a post-high school certificate or diploma, and 705 (29.9%) people exclusively held high school qualifications. The median income was $37,300, compared with $41,500 nationally. 129 people (5.5%) earned over $100,000 compared to 12.1% nationally. The employment status of those at least 15 was 1,227 (52.0%) full-time, 294 (12.5%) part-time, and 54 (2.3%) unemployed.

Individual statistical areas
| Name | Area (km^{2}) | Population | Density (per km^{2}) | Dwellings | Median age | Median income |
|---|---|---|---|---|---|---|
| Taupō Central West | 1.36 | 390 | 279 | 177 | 39.9 years | $43,800 |
| Taupō Central East | 1.09 | 2,457 | 2,254 | 918 | 38.0 years | $35,900 |
| New Zealand | | | | | 38.1 years | $41,500 |

== Education ==
Taupo School is a state primary school, with a roll of 472. The school opened in 1894.

Taupo-nui-a-Tia College is a state secondary school, with a roll of 1,167. The college opened in 1960, replacing the Taupo District High School which operated from 1951 to 1959.

Te Kura Kaupapa Maori o Whakarewa I Te Reo Ki Tuwharetoa is a composite (Year 1–13) Māori immersion school, with a roll of 159.

All these schools are co-educational. Rolls are as of October 2025.
