= Richmond Heights =

Richmond Heights is the name of several places:

Canada

- Richmond Heights, Saskatoon, a neighborhood in Saskatchewan

New Zealand

- Richmond Heights, Taupō

United States

- Richmond Heights, Florida
- Richmond Heights, Missouri
- Richmond Heights, Ohio
- East Richmond Heights, California
- Richmond Heights, Richmond, California
