= Hilltop, New Zealand =

Suburb of Taupō, New Zealand

Hilltop
- Suburb
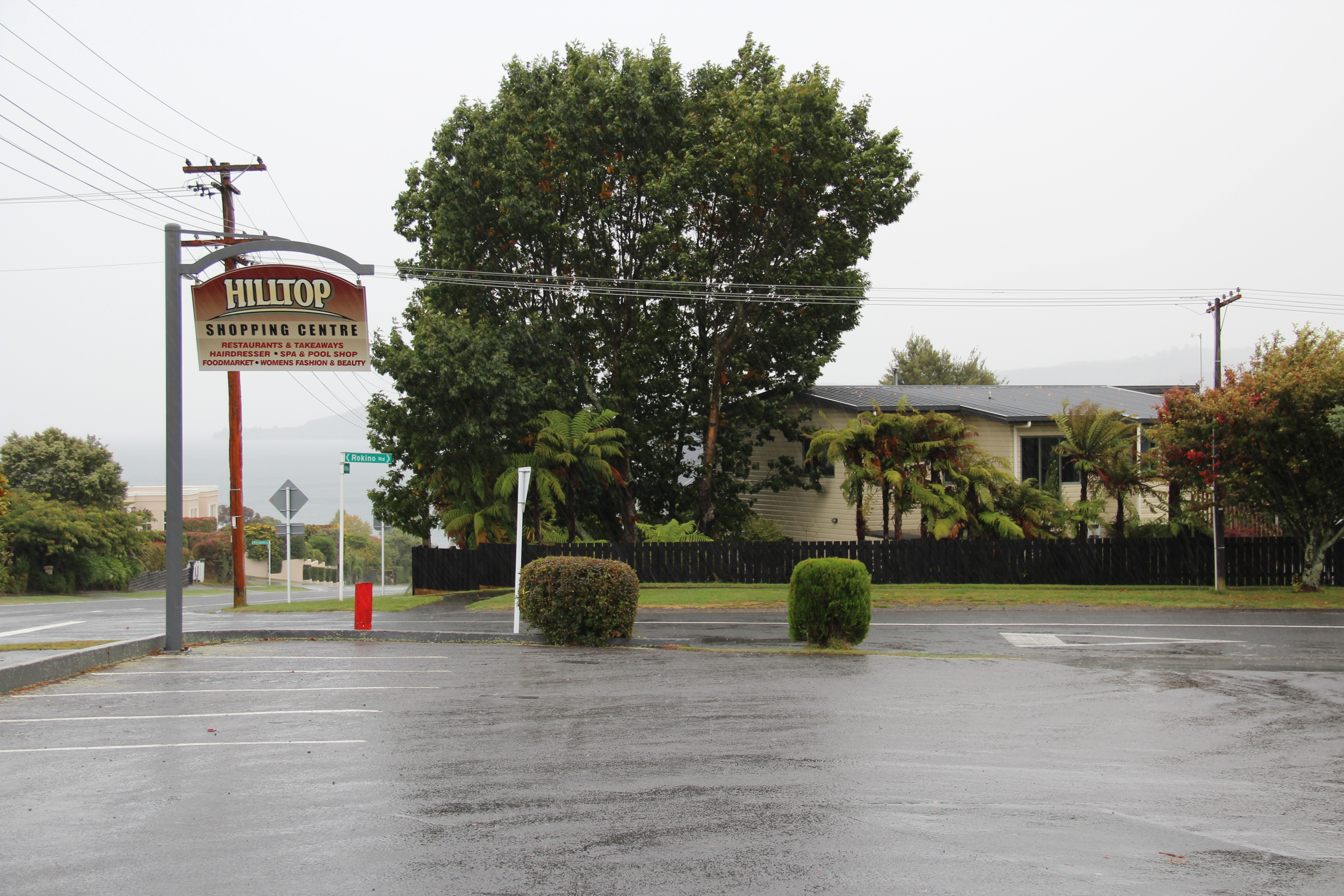
- Hilltop Shopping Centre
- Interactive map of Hilltop
- Coordinates: 38.700310°S 176.093236°E
- Country: New Zealand
- City: Taupō
- Local authority: Taupō District Council
- Electoral ward: Taupō General Ward

Area
  - Land: 368 ha (910 acres)

Population (June 2025)
  - Total: 5,080
  - Density: 1,380/km^{2} (3,580/sq mi)

| Taupō Central | | Tauhara |
| (Lake Taupō) | Hilltop |
| Two Mile Bay | Waipahihi | Maunganamu |

Hilltop is a suburb of Taupō in the Waikato region of New Zealand's North Island.

The suburb is close to Lake Taupō, Taupō Central and several schools. It includes high-value homes with lake views.

Part of the suburb suffered a major power surge in January 2018.

== Demographics ==
Bird Area-Hilltop covers 3.68 km^{2} (1.42 sq mi) and had an estimated population of 5,080 as of June 2025, with a population density of 2,032 people per km^{2}.

Historical population
| Year | Pop. | ±% p.a. |
|---|---|---|
| 2006 | 4,656 | — |
| 2013 | 4,500 | −0.49% |
| 2018 | 4,959 | +1.96% |
| 2023 | 4,974 | +0.06% |

Bird Area-Hilltop had a population of 4,974 in the 2023 New Zealand census, an increase of 15 people (0.3%) since the 2018 census, and an increase of 474 people (10.5%) since the 2013 census. There were 2,403 males, 2,550 females, and 18 people of other genders in 1,905 dwellings. 2.2% of people identified as LGBTIQ+. The median age was 44.0 years (compared with 38.1 years nationally). There were 927 people (18.6%) aged under 15 years, 786 (15.8%) aged 15 to 29, 2,115 (42.5%) aged 30 to 64, and 1,146 (23.0%) aged 65 or older.

People could identify as more than one ethnicity. The results were 80.5% European (Pākehā); 23.1% Māori; 3.2% Pasifika; 6.3% Asian; 1.0% Middle Eastern, Latin American and African New Zealanders (MELAA); and 2.8% other, which includes people giving their ethnicity as "New Zealander". English was spoken by 97.3%, Māori by 4.9%, Samoan by 0.3%, and other languages by 8.6%. No language could be spoken by 1.8% (e.g. too young to talk). New Zealand Sign Language was known by 0.2%. The percentage of people born overseas was 20.6, compared with 28.8% nationally.

Religious affiliations were 31.1% Christian, 1.4% Hindu, 0.4% Islam, 2.2% Māori religious beliefs, 0.5% Buddhist, 0.5% New Age, 0.1% Jewish, and 1.1% other religions. People who answered that they had no religion were 54.9%, and 7.9% of people did not answer the census question.

Of those at least 15 years old, 813 (20.1%) people had a bachelor's or higher degree, 2,298 (56.8%) had a post-high school certificate or diploma, and 930 (23.0%) people exclusively held high school qualifications. The median income was $41,600, compared with $41,500 nationally. 432 people (10.7%) earned over $100,000 compared to 12.1% nationally. The employment status of those at least 15 was 1,986 (49.1%) full-time, 627 (15.5%) part-time, and 75 (1.9%) unemployed.

Individual statistical areas
| Name | Area (km^{2}) | Population | Density (per km^{2}) | Dwellings | Median age | Median income |
|---|---|---|---|---|---|---|
| Bird Area | 1.18 | 2,193 | 1,858 | 897 | 45.5 years | $43,300 |
| Hilltop | 1.61 | 1,950 | 1,211 | 711 | 46.0 years | $40,800 |
| Invergarry | 0.89 | 828 | 930 | 294 | 37.5 years | $39,100 |
| New Zealand | | | | | 38.1 years | $41,500 |

== Education ==
Hilltop School is a state primary school, with a roll of 573. The school opened in 1964.

Taupo Intermediate is a state intermediate school, with a roll of 524. The school opened in 1969.

Both these schools are co-educational. Rolls are as of July 2025.
