= Rangatira Park =

Suburb of Taupō, New Zealand

- Suburb
- Interactive map of Rangatira Park
- Coordinates: 38.673°S 176.069°E
- Country: New Zealand
- City: Taupō
- Local authority: Taupō District Council
- Electoral ward: Taupō Ward

		Huka Falls
	Rangatira Park	Rotokawa
Nukuhau	Taupō Central	Tauhara

Rangatira Park is a suburb in the New Zealand town of Taupō.

The suburb is located just north of Nukuhau and south of Huka Falls, on a hill above Waikato River.

Residents of the suburb experienced an earthquake in September 2019.

== Demographics ==
Rangitira Park is part of the Nukuhau-Rangatira Park statistical area.
