= Hud Rickit =

NZ international rugby union player (born 1951)

- Born: Haydn Rickit; 19 February 1951 (age 75) Taupō, New Zealand
- Height: 2.03 m (6 ft 8 in)
- Weight: 105 kg (231 lb)
- School: Taupo-nui-a-Tia College
- Notable relatives: Manaaki Selby-Rickit (son); Te Paea Selby-Rickit (daughter); Te Huinga Reo Selby-Rickit (daughter)
- Occupation: Electrician

Rugby union career
- Position: Lock
Provincial / State sides
Years	Team	Apps	(Points)
1972	Auckland Colts	1	
1974	Queensland		
1979–1982	Waikato	59	
International career
Years	Team	Apps	(Points)
1978–1982	New Zealand Māori	11	
1981	New Zealand	2	(0)

Haydn "Hud" Rickit (born 19 February 1951) is a former New Zealand rugby union player. A lock, Rickit represented Auckland and Waikato at a provincial level, and also played for Australian state side Queensland in 1974. He was a member of the New Zealand national side, the All Blacks, playing two test matches against Scotland during their 1981 tour of New Zealand.
