= Te Rangiita =

Te Rangiita or Te Rangi-ita may refer to:

- Te Rangi-ita (Ngāti Tūwharetoa), a 17th century Māori chieftain and ancestor of Ngāti Te Rangiita
- Te Rangiita, New Zealand, a settlement on the southeastern shore of Lake Taupō
- Te Rangiita (whare), a marae in Nukuhau
