= Waipahihi =

Suburb of Taupō, New Zealand

- Suburb
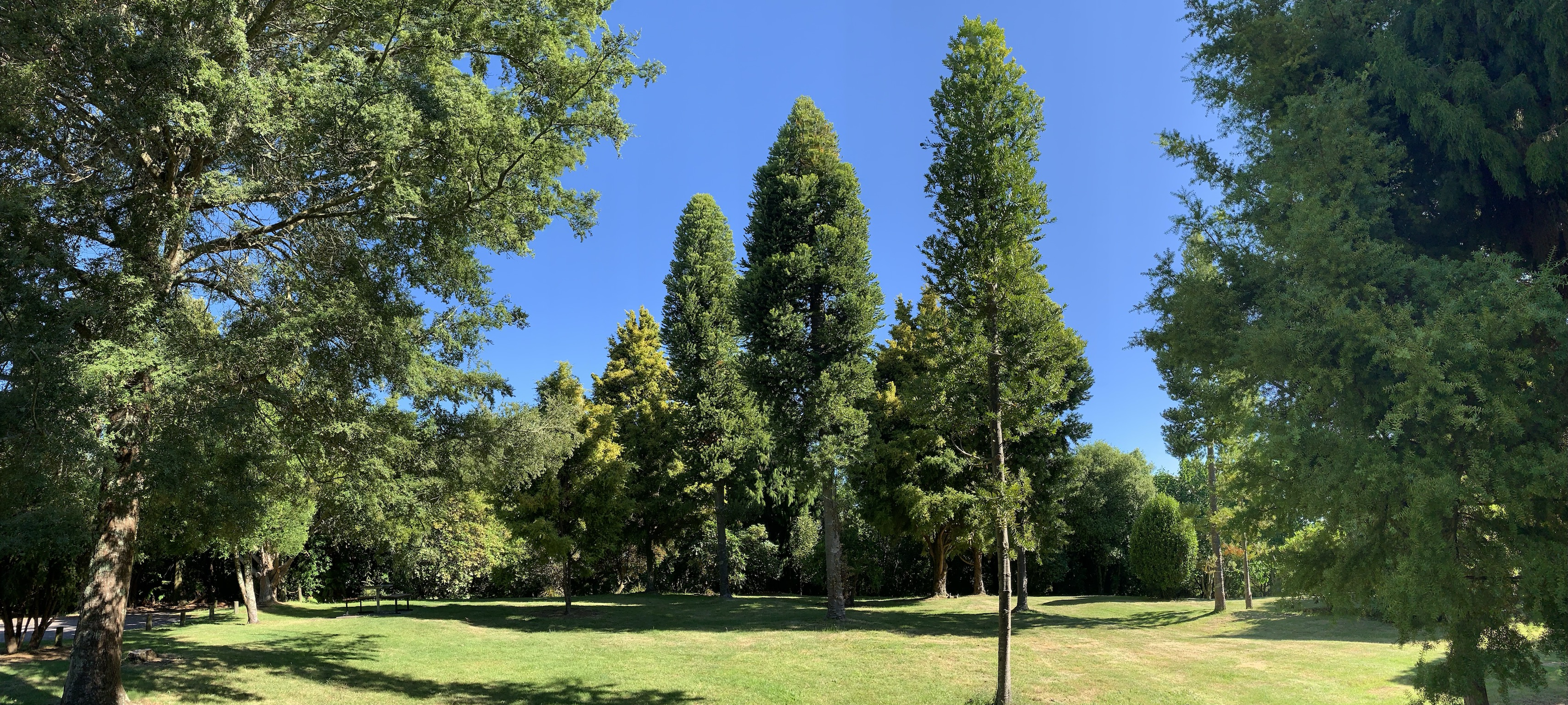
- Waipahihi Botanical Gardens
- Interactive map of Waipahihi
- Coordinates: 38.711°S 176.096°E
- Country: New Zealand
- City: Taupō
- Local authority: Taupō District Council
- Electoral ward: Taupō Ward

Area
  - Land: 2.47 ha (6.1 acres)

Population (June 2025)
  - Total: 2,370
  - Density: 96,000/km^{2} (249,000/sq mi)

Taupō Central	Hilltop
(Lake Taupō)	Waipahihi	Maunganamu
Richmond Heights, Taupō

Waipahihi (Māori: Waipahīhī) is a suburb in Taupō, based on the eastern shores of Lake Taupō on New Zealand's North Island.

The local Waipahīhī Marae is a meeting place of the Ngāti Tūwharetoa hapū of Ngāti Hinerau and Ngāti Hineure. It includes the Kurapoto meeting house.

== Demographics ==
Waipahihi covers 2.47 km^{2} (0.95 sq mi) and had an estimated population of 2,370 as of June 2025, with a population density of 960 people per km^{2}.

Historical population
Year	Pop.	±% p.a.
2006	1,764	—
2013	1,881	+0.92%
2018	2,172	+2.92%
2023	2,292	+1.08%

Waipahihi had a population of 2,292 in the 2023 New Zealand census, an increase of 120 people (5.5%) since the 2018 census, and an increase of 411 people (21.9%) since the 2013 census. There were 1,104 males, 1,185 females, and 6 people of other genders in 894 dwellings. 1.8% of people identified as LGBTIQ+. The median age was 47.2 years (compared with 38.1 years nationally). There were 411 people (17.9%) aged under 15 years, 270 (11.8%) aged 15 to 29, 993 (43.3%) aged 30 to 64, and 621 (27.1%) aged 65 or older.

People could identify as more than one ethnicity. The results were 85.9% European (Pākehā); 18.3% Māori; 2.6% Pasifika; 4.8% Asian; 0.5% Middle Eastern, Latin American and African New Zealanders (MELAA); and 2.4% other, which includes people giving their ethnicity as "New Zealander". English was spoken by 97.9%, Māori by 3.0%, Samoan by 0.7%, and other languages by 8.2%. No language could be spoken by 1.6% (e.g. too young to talk). New Zealand Sign Language was known by 0.4%. The percentage of people born overseas was 21.3, compared with 28.8% nationally.

Religious affiliations were 32.3% Christian, 0.9% Hindu, 0.3% Islam, 1.6% Māori religious beliefs, 0.7% Buddhist, 0.8% New Age, 0.1% Jewish, and 1.0% other religions. People who answered that they had no religion were 56.2%, and 6.5% of people did not answer the census question.

Of those at least 15 years old, 426 (22.6%) people had a bachelor's or higher degree, 1,083 (57.6%) had a post-high school certificate or diploma, and 372 (19.8%) people exclusively held high school qualifications. The median income was $45,200, compared with $41,500 nationally. 270 people (14.4%) earned over $100,000 compared to 12.1% nationally. The employment status of those at least 15 was 900 (47.8%) full-time, 279 (14.8%) part-time, and 18 (1.0%) unemployed.

== Education ==
Waipāhīhī School is a co-educational Year 1-6 state primary school, with a roll of 349 as of July 2026. It opened in 1961.
