= Tauhara College =

Location
- Invergarry Road; Taupō, 2730; New Zealand; 38°41′49.92″S 176°6′15.54″E

Information
- School type: State secondary
- Motto: Committed to Excellence!
- Established: 1975; 51 years ago
- Ministry of Education Institution no.: 166
- Principal: Ben Hancock
- Faculty: 43
- Years offered: 9–13
- Gender: Co-ed
- Enrolment: 689 (July 2026)
- Colours: Blue and gold
- Socio-economic decile: 6N
- Website: www.tauhara.school.nz

Tauhara College is a state coeducational secondary school located in Taupō, New Zealand. Serving Years 9 to 13, the school has approximately 600 students.

Tauhara College is one of three high schools in Taupō; the others are Taupo-nui-a-Tia College and Lake Taupo Christian School (state integrated).

== Enrolment ==
As of July 2026, Tauhara College has a roll of 689 students, of which 296 (43.0%) identify as Māori.

As of 2026, the school has an Equity Index of 486, placing it amongst schools whose students have the above average socioeconomic barriers to achievement (roughly equivalent to deciles 4 and 5 under the former socio-economic decile system).

== Waka ==
The students in the school are divided into four waka ("canoes") which compete in numerous events, mostly sporting, throughout the year in order to gain the most points in the Tauhara College Canoe Competition. The houses, and the colours they are represented by, are:

- Aotea (blue)
- Arawa (green)
- Mataatua (red)
- Tainui (yellow)

== Notable alumni ==
- Donovan Bixley – illustrator, author of Faithfully Mozart
- Bevan Docherty – Triathlete, Olympic silver medalist
- Te Ururoa Flavell – Minister of Māori Development; leader of the Māori Party; former Head of Māori Studies
- Carly Flynn – journalist, presenter of Sunrise
- Melina Hamilton – pole vaulter, Olympian
- Sammie Maxwell (born 2001) – cross-country cyclist
- Todd McClay – Member of Parliament for Rotorua; former Cook Islands diplomat (Ambassador to European Union)
- Dion Waller – former New Zealand All Black
