= Manaaki Selby-Rickit =

New Zealand rugby union player

- Born: 5 June 1996 (age 30) Ōtaki, New Zealand
- Height: 200 cm (6 ft 7 in)
- Weight: 112 kg (247 lb; 17 st 9 lb)
- School: Te Kura Kaupapa Māori o Te Rito
- Notable relative(s): Hud Rickit (father); Te Huinga Reo Selby-Rickit (sister); Te Paea Selby-Rickit (sister)

Rugby union career
- Position: Lock
- Current team: Urayasu D-Rocks, Bay of Plenty
Senior career
Years	Team	Apps	(Points)
2017–2020	Southland	22	(20)
2020–2022	Highlanders	21	(5)
2021–	Bay of Plenty	8	(5)
2023–2025	Chiefs	20	(5)
2025–	Urayasu D-Rocks	11	(0)
- Correct as of 16 July 2022
International career
Years	Team	Apps	(Points)
2020	South Island	1	(0)
2020–2022	Māori All Blacks	5	(0)
- Correct as of 16 July 2022

Manaaki Selby-Rickit is a New Zealand rugby union player who plays for the Bay of Plenty Steamers in the National Provincial Championship competition.

He is the son of former All Black, Hud Rickit.

== Personal life ==
Selby-Rickit is a New Zealander of Māori descent (Ngāti Raukawa descent).

== Assault conviction ==
Selby-Rickit was convicted of assault after an altercation with an intoxicated person on a night out.
