= Great Lake Relay =

Running event held in Taupō, New Zealand

A team finishing the 2008 Great Lake Relay

The Great Lake Relay is an annual team running event over approximately 160 km. It is held at Taupō, New Zealand on the third Saturday of February (not to be confused with the Great Lakes Relay held in Michigan in July). Each team consists of ten to eighteen members, either running or walking to complete the eighteen 4.7 km to 14.4 km legs around the largest lake in Australasia, Lake Taupō.

With over 5000 registered amateur and professional runners from all over Australasia taking part in the race each year, it is the biggest event of its type in the Southern Hemisphere. While there are prizes awarded to the winners of the relay, and $150,000 worth of spot prizes given away, most of the runners take part just for the joy of team building and participating.

== Race ==
=== Qualifying ===
The Great Lake Relay is open to all runners and walkers, both male and female, of any age, ability and from any nation. For safety reasons however, the event is limited to the first 450 teams to complete an entry form, and pay the entry fee.

The Athletics New Zealand 100 km Championships, and the New Zealand 100 Mile Ultra Runners Road Championships have also been incorporated into this event in some years.

=== Grades ===
Teams or individuals may choose to participate in any one of the following five grades.

- Runners: Running teams consist of 10-18 members. Each team member must run one or two legs.
- Walkers:Walking teams consist of 10-18 members who must walk one or two legs.
- Composite Teams (Runners and Walkers):Composite teams consist of 10-18 members who must complete one or two legs each. Legs 1, 3, 4, 9, 10, 15 & 16 must be completed by walkers. Team members may walk or run legs 2, 5, 6, 7, 8, 11, 12, 13, 14, 17 & 18.
- Two Person Team (2x50km):Both members of this team must complete 50 km of the relay course, consecutively. This course starts 5 km into the fifth leg.
- Individual (100 km):Competitors must be current members of Athletics NZ to be eligible for the NZ championship title. Each individual competitor must start 5 km into the fifth leg, and complete 100 km of the course by 6.00pm of the race day.

=== Start time ===
The relay uses a staggered "wave start" beginning at 9:00 pm Friday night for the walkers who have an estimated team time greater than 18 hrs. At 10:30 pm, the walkers who estimate to finish in less than 18 hrs, along with the composite teams with an estimated team time of more than 17 hrs 30 mins begin. The rest of the composite teams commence the race at 11:30 pm.

The first batch of runners starts at 2:00 am Saturday morning. These are the running teams who have an estimated team time greater than 14hrs. The final wave starts at 3:00 am. This includes the rest of the running teams, as well as the individuals and two person teams.

=== Course Description ===
Leg Number	Brief Leg Description	Stage Classification	Distance
Leg 1	Start outside the Tennis Club on Redoubt Street. Proceed to State Highway 1 then uphill for 1.0 km. Undulating and gradual uphill. Flat for 1.2 km, then gradual uphill for 1.0 km. Undulating to finish.	Average	14.4 km
Leg 2	Flat with gradual downhill's for 5.0 km. A long 2.2 km uphill, followed by long uphill and downhill sections for the remainder of the leg.	Hard	14.1 km
Leg 3	Large rolling hills for the first 3.8 km, then easy gradual downhill for the remaining 6.3 km.	Average	10.1 km
Leg 4	Very gradual uphill with some downhill's for 4.0 km, followed by an easy 3.0 km downhill section with some flats. Undulating to finish.	Average	8.3 km
Leg 5	Easy uphill for 0.9 km followed by rolling hills for 4.1 km. Slight rise then downhill 1.0 km, over bridge, then hard climb for 4.1 km to finish.	Hard	10.1 km
Leg 6	Flat for 1 km with an easy downhill for 1 km. A small rise followed by another 1.1 km downhill. A steady climb then downhill for 1 km and undulating to finish.	Average	8.4 km
Leg 7	Undulating for 5.0 km with a 500m climb to finish.	Average	5.5 km
Leg 8	2.0 km downhill and 500m flat. Long gradual downhill and flat sections. Finish with a couple of hills.	Easy	7.0 km
Leg 9	Gradual downhill for 1.5 km followed by undulating hills. A hard 3.0 km climb up the Kuratau Hill, followed by a small dip and climb to finish.	Hard	7.4 km
Leg 10	Steep downhill for 2.0 km followed by an undulating section of 1.0 km and a climb for 0.9 km. Easy undulating section to finish.	Easy	7.1 km
Leg 11	An undulating section for 1.3 km followed by a long downhill section of 3.2 km to the Tokaanu flats. All the rest of the leg is flat.	Average	10.9 km
Leg 12	Flat to State Highway 1 for 500m. Turn left, stay on the right hand side of State Highway 1, flat to finish at the Motuoapa Reserve.	Average	10.2 km
Leg 13	Flat for 3.0 km to the Tauranga Taupō River Bridge and flat to finish.	Average	8.6 km
Leg 14	Leg is flat and undulating. The last 4.3 km of are very dangerous due to narrow and windy sections of road.	Dangerous	7.4 km
Leg 15	Flat to Hatepe for 2 km, then a steep hard climb up the famous Hatepe hill for 2.7 km. Flat to finish.	Average	6.1 km
Leg 16	Very easy downhill for 6.0 km followed by a steep downhill for 1.3 km into Waitahanui. Flat for 600m to finish.	Easy	8.0 km
Leg 17	Flat for 3.7 km passing through Five Mile Bay. 1 km climb to finish.	Easy	4.7 km
Leg 18	Gradual downhill to Taupō, and into Tongariro Domain to finish.	Average	7.5 km

Note: All distances are + or - 0.2

=== Event Records ===
The race organizers keep a standard time clock for all entries, though official timekeeping ceases after 6.00pm on Saturday.

Course records up to 2007, are:

Relay

Grade	Team	Town	Time	Year
Runners	Adidas Adistars	Auckland	8:42:47	2002
Walkers	Team New Balance	Whangarei	13:47:00	2007
Composite	Bush Survivors	Woodville	12:49:08	2002
Two person team (2x50km)	Riverhead 50k	Riverhead	8:56:18	2005
100 km Solo Walker	Peter Baillie	Plimmerton	12:25:00	2005

New Zealand

Grade	Winner	Time	Year
NZ 100 km Championships: Solo Men	Mark Bright	8:09:23	2007
NZ 100 km Championships: Solo Women	Carrie White	9:45:37	2007
NZ 100mile Championships: Solo men	Vesa Murto	16:49:03	2002
NZ 100mile Championships: Solo women	Carolynn Tassie	18:48:30	2002

International

Grade	Winner	Country	Time	Year
100 km: Solo Men	Colin Oliver	Australia	7:44:41	2004
100mile: Solo Male:	Yiannis Kouros	Australia	12:35:48	2002
