= Nukuhau =

Suburb of Taupō, New Zealand

- Suburb
- Interactive map of Nukuhau
- Coordinates: 38.681665°S 176.060733°E
- Country: New Zealand
- City: Taupō
- Local authority: Taupō District Council
- Electoral ward: Taupō General Ward

Area
  - Land: 640 ha (1,600 acres)

Population (June 2025)
  - Total: 5,040
  - Density: 790/km^{2} (2,000/sq mi)

Oruanui		Rangatira Park
Kinloch	Nukuhau	Tauhara
Acacia Bay	(Lake Taupō)	Taupō Central

Nukuhau is a suburb of Taupō in the Waikato Region of New Zealand's North Island.

== Demographics ==
Nukuhau-Rangatira Park covers 6.40 km^{2} (2.47 sq mi) and had an estimated population of 5,040 as of June 2025, with a population density of 788 people per km^{2}.

Historical population
Year	Pop.	±% p.a.
2006	3,456	—
2013	3,705	+1.00%
2018	4,332	+3.18%
2023	4,860	+2.33%

Nukuhau-Rangatira Park had a population of 4,860 in the 2023 New Zealand census, an increase of 528 people (12.2%) since the 2018 census, and an increase of 1,155 people (31.2%) since the 2013 census. There were 2,364 males, 2,487 females, and 9 people of other genders in 1,992 dwellings. 2.3% of people identified as LGBTIQ+. The median age was 47.3 years (compared with 38.1 years nationally). There were 801 people (16.5%) aged under 15 years, 675 (13.9%) aged 15 to 29, 2,115 (43.5%) aged 30 to 64, and 1,269 (26.1%) aged 65 or older.

People could identify as more than one ethnicity. The results were 79.8% European (Pākehā); 20.2% Māori; 2.5% Pasifika; 9.8% Asian; 1.0% Middle Eastern, Latin American and African New Zealanders (MELAA); and 1.7% other, which includes people giving their ethnicity as "New Zealander". English was spoken by 97.3%, Māori by 4.9%, Samoan by 0.2%, and other languages by 10.2%. No language could be spoken by 1.4% (e.g. too young to talk). New Zealand Sign Language was known by 0.4%. The percentage of people born overseas was 21.6, compared with 28.8% nationally.

Religious affiliations were 32.3% Christian, 2.3% Hindu, 0.2% Islam, 2.3% Māori religious beliefs, 0.7% Buddhist, 0.2% New Age, 0.1% Jewish, and 1.3% other religions. People who answered that they had no religion were 51.9%, and 8.7% of people did not answer the census question.

Of those at least 15 years old, 780 (19.2%) people had a bachelor's or higher degree, 2,304 (56.8%) had a post-high school certificate or diploma, and 972 (23.9%) people exclusively held high school qualifications. The median income was $39,800, compared with $41,500 nationally. 420 people (10.3%) earned over $100,000 compared to 12.1% nationally. The employment status of those at least 15 was 1,941 (47.8%) full-time, 561 (13.8%) part-time, and 81 (2.0%) unemployed.

Individual statistical areas
Name	Area (km^{2})	Population	Density (per km^{2})	Dwellings	Median age	Median income
Brentwood	3.56	2,178	612	885	50.1 years	$38,700
Nukuhau	0.81	1,560	1,926	606	39.1 years	$42,100
Rangatira Park	2.04	1,122	550	501	53.3 years	$38,800
New Zealand					38.1 years	$41,500

== Marae ==
The suburb has two marae.

- Nukuhau Marae and Rauhoto meeting house is a meeting place of the Ngāti Tūwharetoa hapū of Ngāti Rauhoto and Ngāti Te Urunga. In October 2020, the Government committed $1,338,668 from the Provincial Growth Fund to upgrade the marae and 4 other Ngāti Tūwharetoa marae, creating 19 jobs.
- Te Rangiita Marae and meeting house for the Ngāti Tūwharetoa hapū of Ngāti Ruingarangi.

== Education ==
St Patrick's Catholic School is a state-integrated Catholic primary school, with a roll of 246 as of July 2025. The school opened in 1997.
