= Richmond Heights, Taupō =

Suburb of Taupō, New Zealand

Richmond Heights
- Suburb
- Interactive map of Richmond Heights
- Coordinates: 38.719°S 176.088°E
- Country: New Zealand
- City: Taupō
- Local authority: Taupō District Council
- Electoral ward: Taupō General Ward

Area
  - Land: 137 ha (340 acres)

Population (June 2025)
  - Total: 2,480
  - Density: 1,810/km^{2} (4,690/sq mi)

		Waipahihi
(Lake Taupō)	Richmond Heights	Maunganamu
Wharewaka

Richmond Heights is a suburb in Taupō, based on the eastern shores of Lake Taupō on New Zealand's North Island. It is one of the areas in Taupō expected to have new housing developed in the mid to late 2020s.

== Demographics ==
Richmond Heights covers 1.37 km^{2} (0.53 sq mi) and had an estimated population of 2,520 as of June 2022, with a population density of 1,839 people per km^{2}.

Historical population
Year	Pop.	±% p.a.
2006	2,151	—
2013	2,106	−0.30%
2018	2,328	+2.02%
2023	2,403	+0.64%

Richmond Heights had a population of 2,403 in the 2023 New Zealand census, an increase of 75 people (3.2%) since the 2018 census, and an increase of 297 people (14.1%) since the 2013 census. There were 1,188 males, 1,203 females, and 9 people of other genders in 855 dwellings. 2.5% of people identified as LGBTIQ+. The median age was 37.7 years (compared with 38.1 years nationally). There were 498 people (20.7%) aged under 15 years, 414 (17.2%) aged 15 to 29, 1,089 (45.3%) aged 30 to 64, and 399 (16.6%) aged 65 or older.

People could identify as more than one ethnicity. The results were 78.5% European (Pākehā); 28.8% Māori; 3.5% Pasifika; 4.2% Asian; 0.7% Middle Eastern, Latin American and African New Zealanders (MELAA); and 3.0% other, which includes people giving their ethnicity as "New Zealander". English was spoken by 97.3%, Māori by 5.6%, Samoan by 0.4%, and other languages by 7.5%. No language could be spoken by 2.0% (e.g. too young to talk). New Zealand Sign Language was known by 0.6%. The percentage of people born overseas was 15.9, compared with 28.8% nationally.

Religious affiliations were 28.6% Christian, 0.5% Hindu, 0.4% Islam, 2.5% Māori religious beliefs, 0.7% Buddhist, 0.2% New Age, 0.1% Jewish, and 1.1% other religions. People who answered that they had no religion were 59.7%, and 6.9% of people did not answer the census question.

Of those at least 15 years old, 330 (17.3%) people had a bachelor's or higher degree, 1,152 (60.5%) had a post-high school certificate or diploma, and 426 (22.4%) people exclusively held high school qualifications. The median income was $44,100, compared with $41,500 nationally. 183 people (9.6%) earned over $100,000 compared to 12.1% nationally. The employment status of those at least 15 was 1,020 (53.5%) full-time, 285 (15.0%) part-time, and 48 (2.5%) unemployed.
