= Huka Falls =

Waterfall on the Waikato River in Taupō, New Zealand

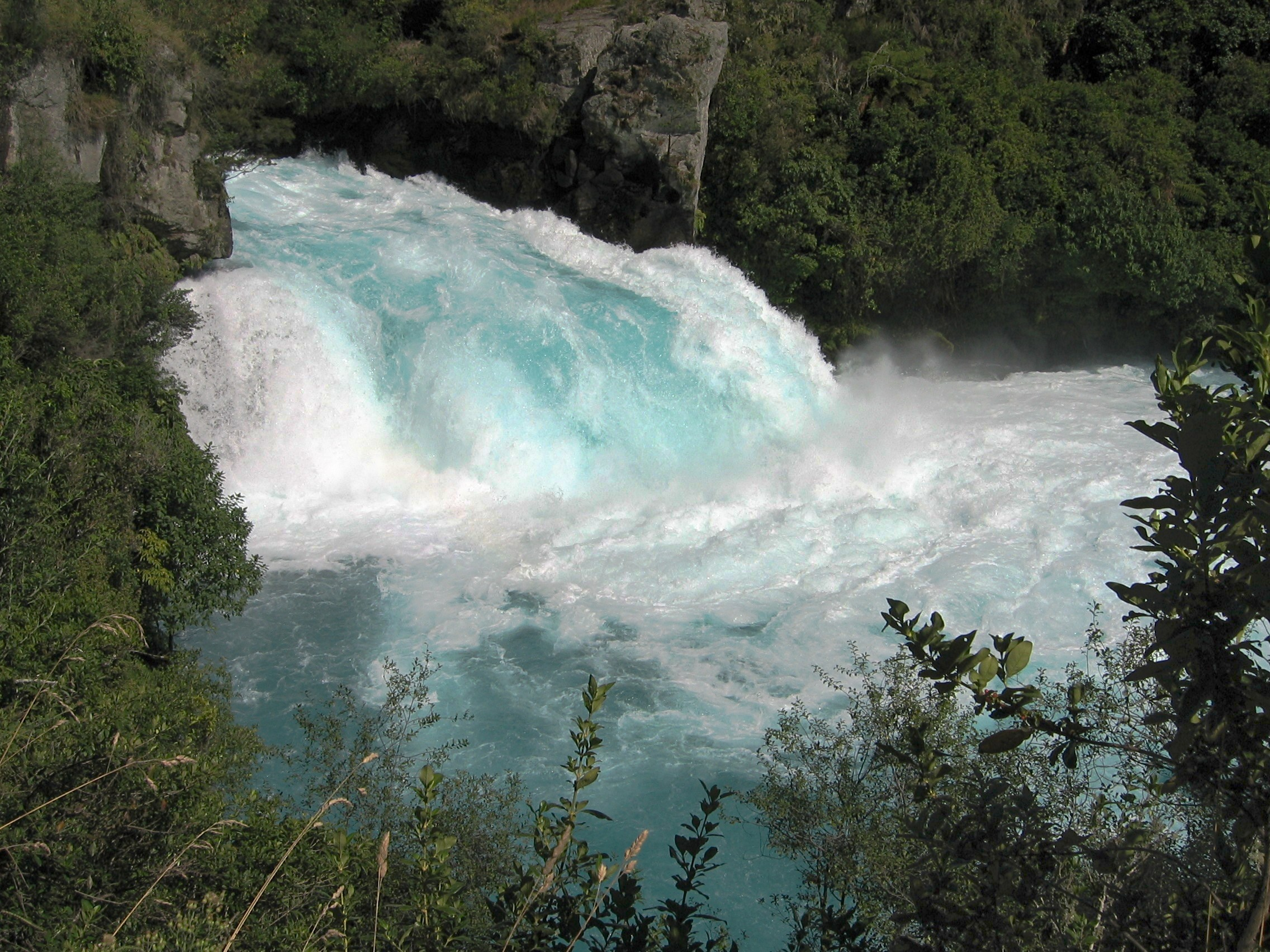
- Interactive map of Huka Falls
- Location: Taupō, New Zealand
- Coordinates: 38.649497°S 176.089683°E
- Type: Cascade
- Watercourse: Waikato River
- Average flow rate: 220 m^{3}/s

Huka Falls is a set of waterfalls on the Waikato River, which drains Lake Taupō in New Zealand.

A few hundred metres upstream from Huka Falls, the Waikato River narrows from approximately 100 metres across to a canyon only 15 metres across. The canyon is carved into lake floor sediments laid down before Taupō Volcano's Oruanui eruption 26,500 years ago.

The volume of water flowing through often approaches 220 cubic metres per second, making it one of the highest flowing waterfalls in the world. The flow rate is regulated by Mercury NZ Ltd through the Taupō Control Gates as part of their hydro system planning, with Waikato Regional Council dictating flows during periods of downstream flooding in the Waikato River catchment. Mercury NZ have ability to control the flows between 50 cubic metres per second and 319 cubic metres per second.

At the top of the falls is a set of small waterfalls dropping about eight metres. The final stage of the falls is a six-metre drop, raised to an effective 11 metre fall by the depth of the water. The falls are a popular tourist attraction, being close to Taupō and readily accessible from State Highway 1.

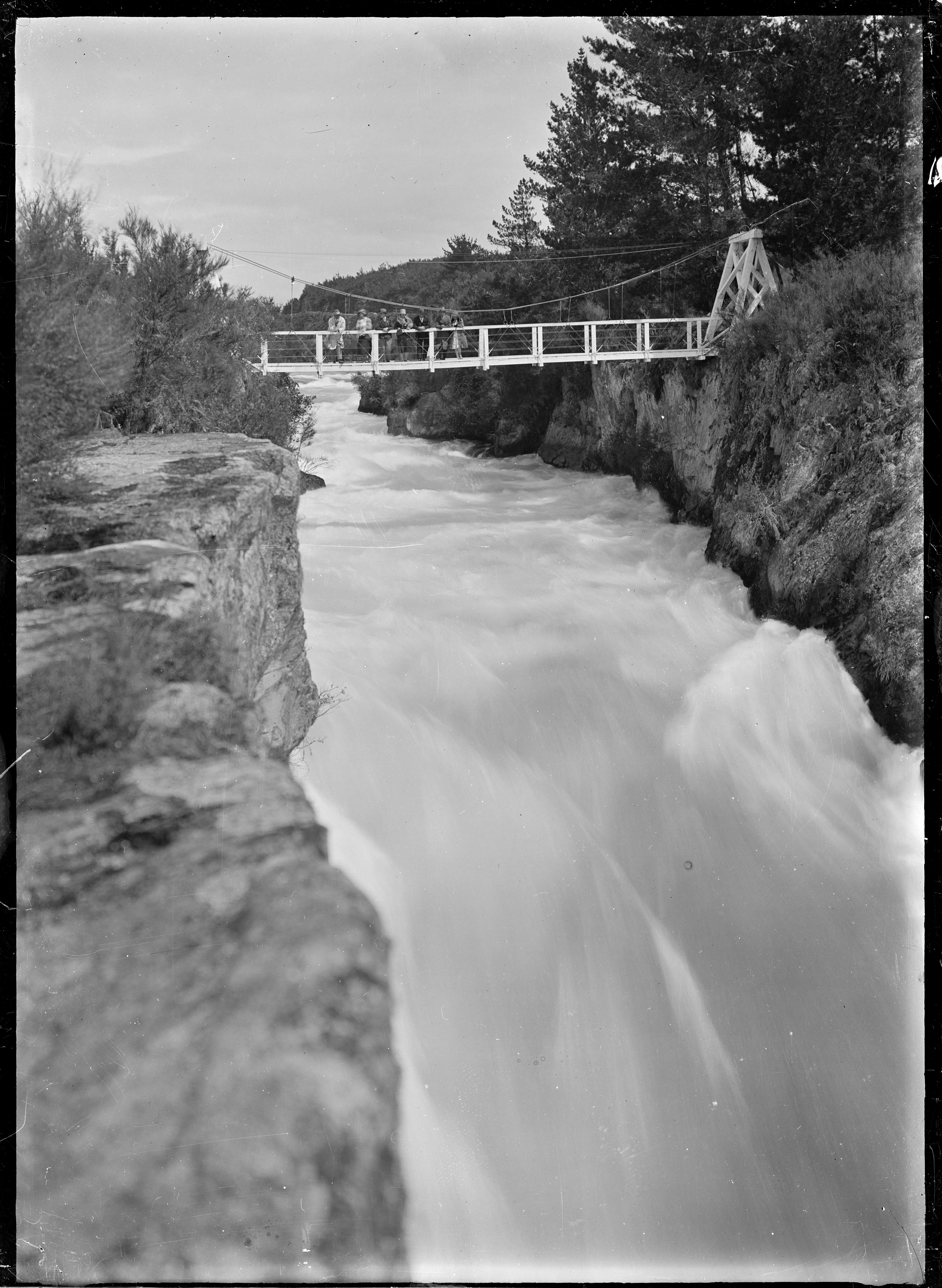
Huka Falls and suspension bridge with onlookers in 1928

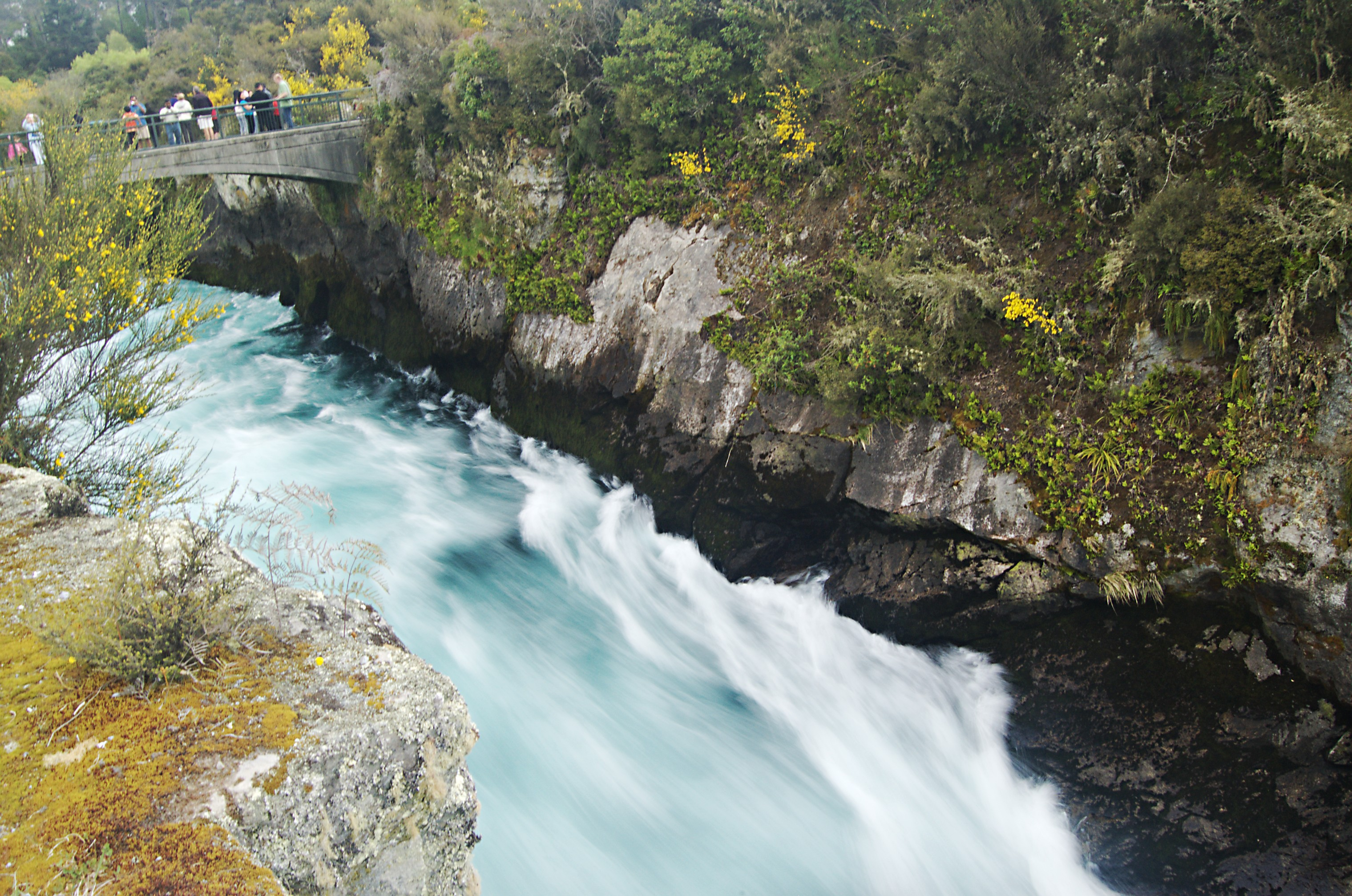
The narrow canyon, with the tourist bridge visible at top left

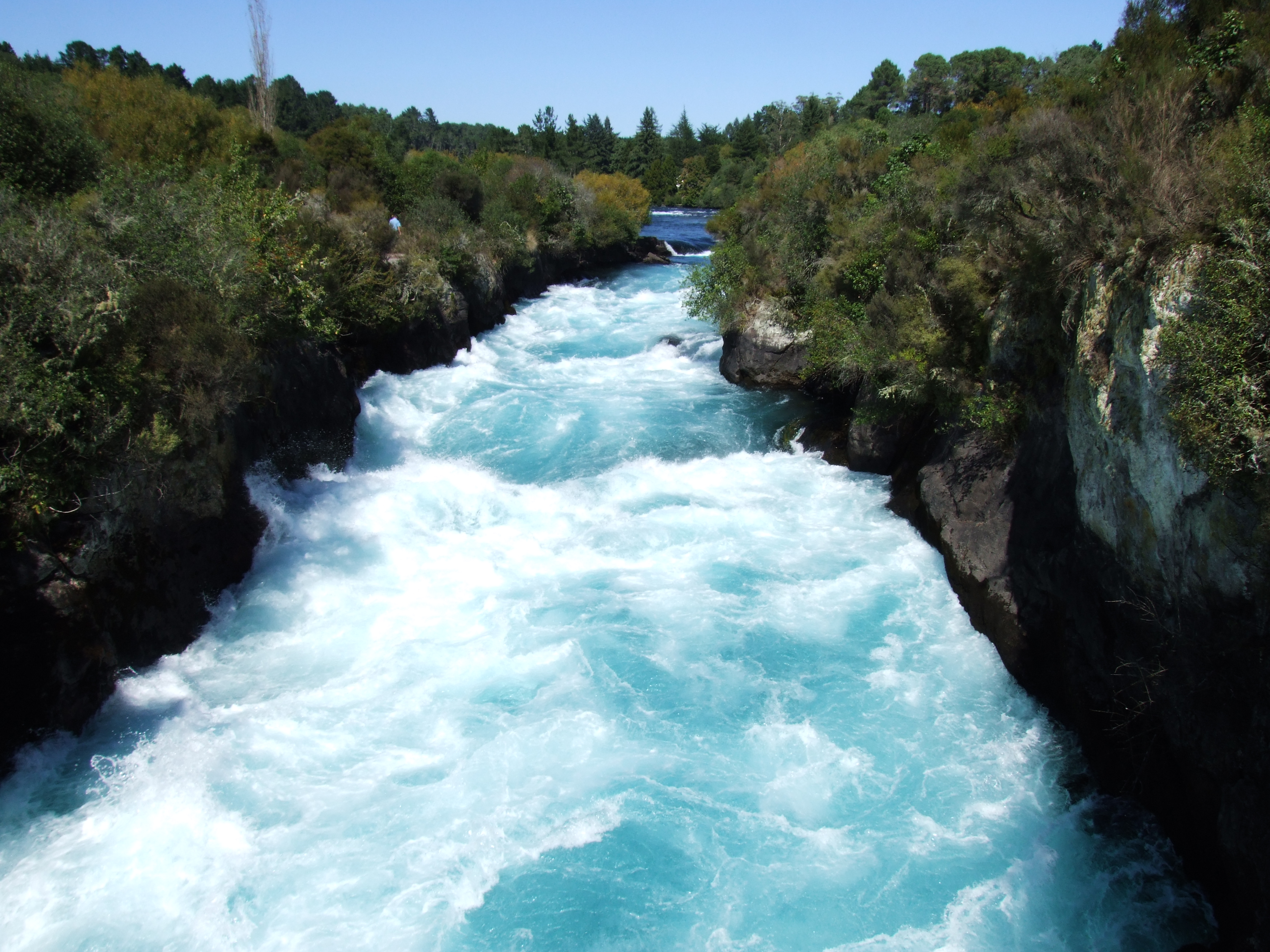
Looking upstream against the fast, powerful current of the falls

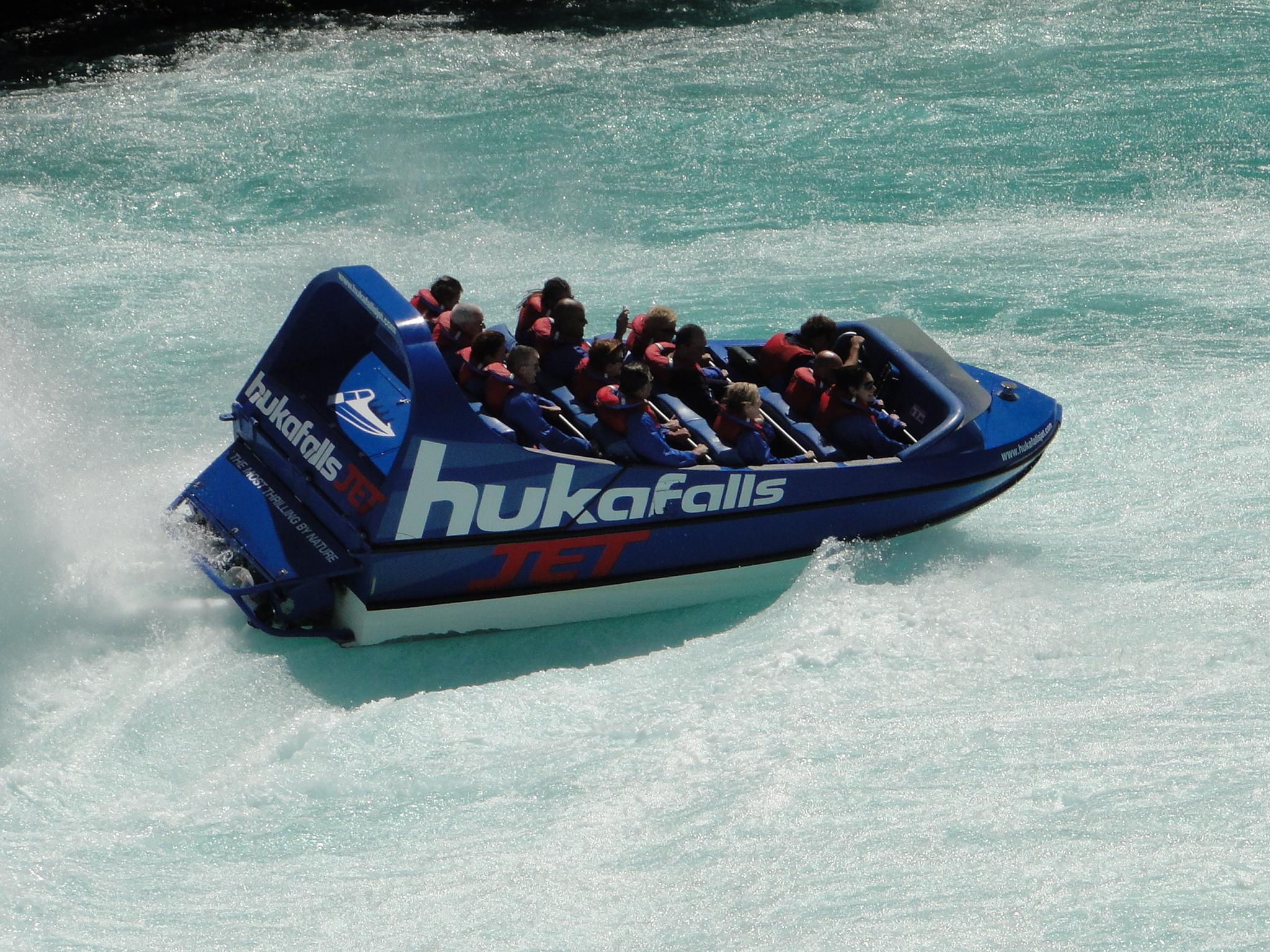
Jetboat near the base of Huka Falls

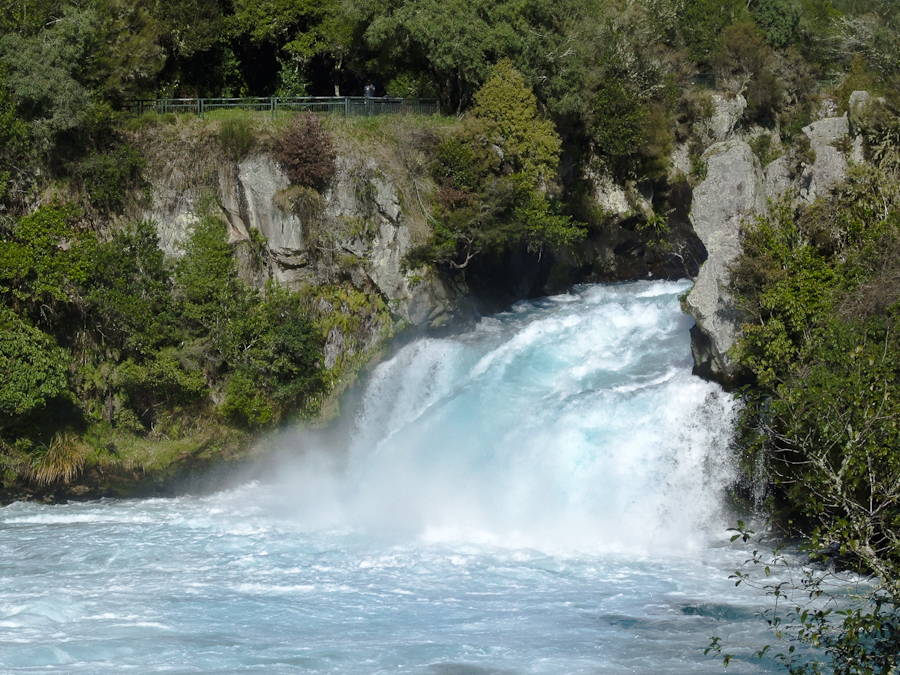
Huka Falls and the observation point

== See also ==
- List of waterfalls
- List of waterfalls in New Zealand
