= Taupo Intermediate School =

Location
- Kotare Street, Taupō, New Zealand; 38.6973°S 176.0977°E

Information
- Type: State, Co-educational, Intermediate Years 7–8
- Motto: Striving For Excellence
- Established: 1969
- Ministry of Education Institution no.: 1988
- Principal: Brent Woods
- Enrolment: 504 (July 2026)
- Socio-economic decile: 6
- Website: taupointermediate.co.nz

Taupo Intermediate School is a medium-sized intermediate school (year 7 and year 8) located in Taupō, New Zealand.

== Alumni ==
- Sammie Maxwell (born 2001), cross-country cyclist
