= Tauhara =

- Suburb
- Interactive map of Tauhara
- Coordinates: 38.684°S 176.108°E
- Country: New Zealand
- City: Taupō District
- Electoral ward: Taupō General Ward; Taupō Rural East General Ward

Area
  - Land: 1,283 ha (3,170 acres)

Population (June 2025)
  - Total: 4,910
  - Density: 383/km^{2} (991/sq mi)

Rangatira Park		Rotokawa
Taupō Central	Tauhara
Hilltop		Maunganamu

Tauhara is a suburb and geothermal area of Taupō in the Waikato region of New Zealand's North Island.

The area's main geographic feature, Mount Tauhara, is culturally significant to local hapū. It is privately owned but has a public walking track and viewing areas, with panoramic views over Lake Taupō. The tracks were closed in 2015 because of vandalism, then reopened when the vandalism stopped.

In December 2018, the Taupō District Council reduced the speed limit on the main Tauhara Road from 70 km/h to 50 km/h.

== Demographics ==
Tauhara covers 12.83 km^{2} (4.95 sq mi) and had an estimated population of 4,910 as of June 2025, with a population density of 383 people per km^{2}.

Historical population
Year	Pop.	±% p.a.
2006	4,362	—
2013	4,158	−0.68%
2018	4,401	+1.14%
2023	4,617	+0.96%

Tauhara had a population of 4,617 in the 2023 New Zealand census, an increase of 216 people (4.9%) since the 2018 census, and an increase of 459 people (11.0%) since the 2013 census. There were 2,268 males, 2,343 females, and 6 people of other genders in 1,605 dwellings. 2.7% of people identified as LGBTIQ+. The median age was 33.3 years (compared with 38.1 years nationally). There were 1,053 people (22.8%) aged under 15 years, 954 (20.7%) aged 15 to 29, 2,046 (44.3%) aged 30 to 64, and 564 (12.2%) aged 65 or older.

People could identify as more than one ethnicity. The results were 68.6% European (Pākehā); 41.1% Māori; 6.7% Pasifika; 7.5% Asian; 0.7% Middle Eastern, Latin American and African New Zealanders (MELAA); and 2.6% other, which includes people giving their ethnicity as "New Zealander". English was spoken by 96.7%, Māori by 9.4%, Samoan by 0.6%, and other languages by 7.1%. No language could be spoken by 2.0% (e.g. too young to talk). New Zealand Sign Language was known by 0.6%. The percentage of people born overseas was 16.5, compared with 28.8% nationally.

Religious affiliations were 24.7% Christian, 1.9% Hindu, 0.1% Islam, 5.3% Māori religious beliefs, 0.6% Buddhist, 0.5% New Age, 0.1% Jewish, and 1.8% other religions. People who answered that they had no religion were 58.0%, and 7.1% of people did not answer the census question.

Of those at least 15 years old, 441 (12.4%) people had a bachelor's or higher degree, 2,163 (60.7%) had a post-high school certificate or diploma, and 957 (26.9%) people exclusively held high school qualifications. The median income was $40,800, compared with $41,500 nationally. 207 people (5.8%) earned over $100,000 compared to 12.1% nationally. The employment status of those at least 15 was 1,986 (55.7%) full-time, 495 (13.9%) part-time, and 120 (3.4%) unemployed.

Individual statistical areas
Name	Area (km^{2})	Population	Density (per km^{2})	Dwellings	Median age	Median income
Tauhara	1.85	1,689	913	579	32.6 years	$39,000
Centennial	9.86	87	9	30	41.4 years	$51,200
Mountview	1.13	2,838	2,512	999	33.9 years	$41,500
New Zealand					38.1 years	$41,500

== Education ==
Tauhara Primary School is a Year 1–6 state primary school with a roll of 257. The school opened in 1959.

Mountview School is a state primary school, with a roll of 313. The school opened in 1970. A planned 50th jubilee in 2020 was postponed due to the COVID-19 pandemic.

Tauhara College is a state secondary school, with a roll of 689. The college opened in 1976.

Lake Taupo Christian School is a Year 1–13 state integrated Christian school, with a roll of 138. The school opened in 1993.

All these schools are co-educational. Rolls are as of July 2026.
