= Acacia Bay =

Suburb of Taupō, New Zealand

- Suburb
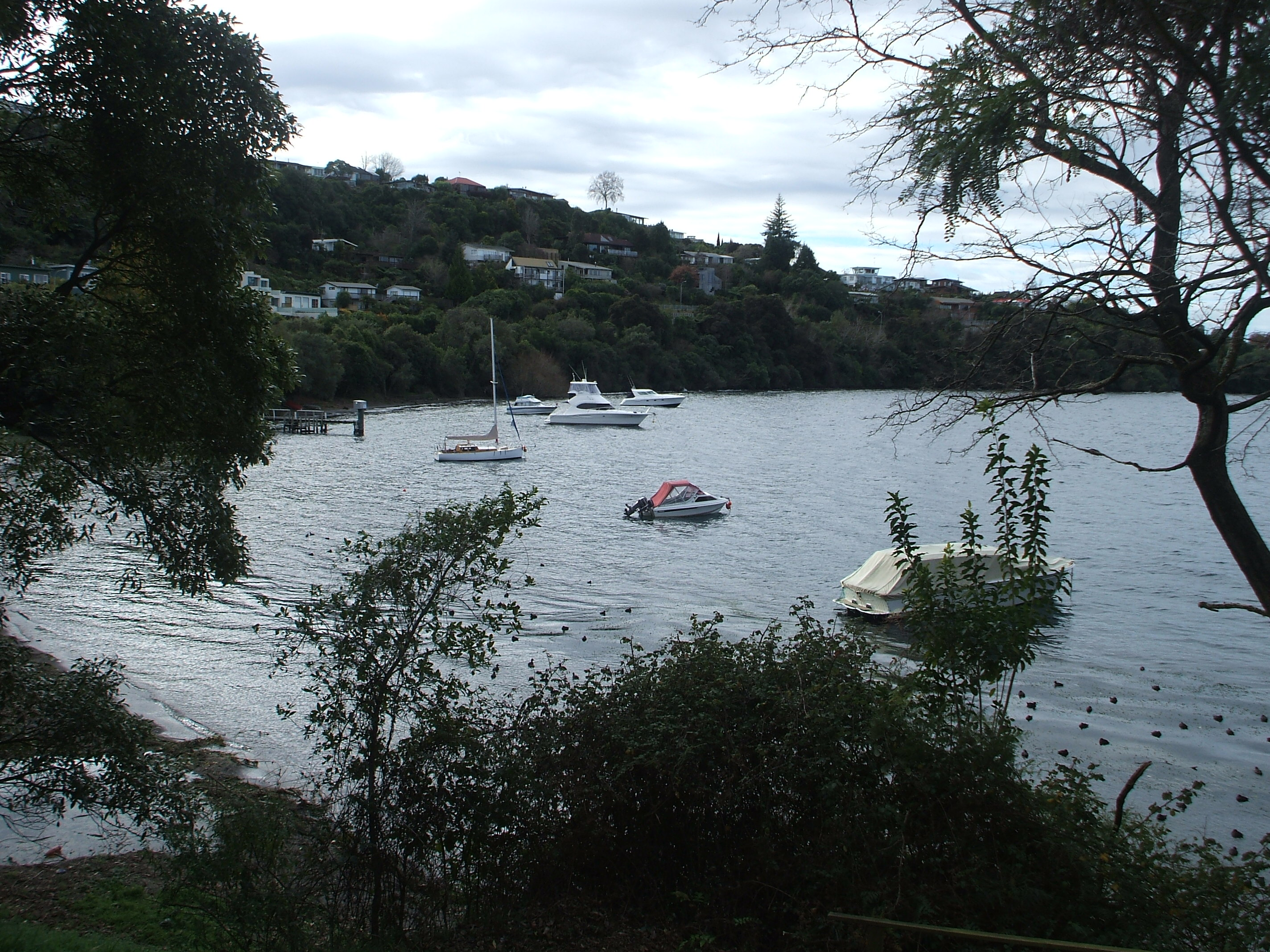
- Interactive map of Acacia Bay
- Coordinates: 38.7026°S 176.0307°E
- Country: New Zealand
- City: Taupō
- Local authority: Taupō District Council
- Electoral ward: Taupō General Ward

Area
  - Land: 715 ha (1,770 acres)

Population (June 2025)
  - Total: 1,820
  - Density: 255/km^{2} (659/sq mi)

Kinloch		Nukuhau
	Acacia Bay
	(Lake Taupō)	(Tapuaeharuru Bay)

Acacia Bay is a suburb of Taupō, on the western edge of Tapuaeharuru Bay Lake Taupō in New Zealand. There are four main beach areas. It is located approximately 3 km (1.9 mi) west of Taupō CBD.

== Demographics ==
Acacia Bay covers 7.15 km^{2} (2.76 sq mi) and had an estimated population of 1,820 as of June 2025, with a population density of 255 people per km^{2}.

Historical population
Year	Pop.	±% p.a.
2006	1,233	—
2013	1,425	+2.09%
2018	1,653	+3.01%
2023	1,770	+1.38%

Acacia Bay had a population of 1,770 in the 2023 New Zealand census, an increase of 117 people (7.1%) since the 2018 census, and an increase of 345 people (24.2%) since the 2013 census. There were 903 males, 864 females, and 3 people of other genders in 702 dwellings. 1.9% of people identified as LGBTIQ+. The median age was 52.5 years (compared with 38.1 years nationally). There were 252 people (14.2%) aged under 15 years, 207 (11.7%) aged 15 to 29, 846 (47.8%) aged 30 to 64, and 465 (26.3%) aged 65 or older.

People could identify as more than one ethnicity. The results were 92.0% European (Pākehā); 12.2% Māori; 1.0% Pasifika; 4.2% Asian; 0.5% Middle Eastern, Latin American and African New Zealanders (MELAA); and 3.4% other, which includes people giving their ethnicity as "New Zealander". English was spoken by 98.6%, Māori by 2.0%, and other languages by 7.3%. No language could be spoken by 1.0% (e.g. too young to talk). New Zealand Sign Language was known by 0.3%. The percentage of people born overseas was 18.5, compared with 28.8% nationally.

Religious affiliations were 34.7% Christian, 0.5% Hindu, 0.3% Islam, 0.7% Māori religious beliefs, 0.3% Buddhist, 0.7% New Age, 0.2% Jewish, and 1.0% other religions. People who answered that they had no religion were 55.4%, and 6.4% of people did not answer the census question.

Of those at least 15 years old, 360 (23.7%) people had a bachelor's or higher degree, 897 (59.1%) had a post-high school certificate or diploma, and 261 (17.2%) people exclusively held high school qualifications. The median income was $49,600, compared with $41,500 nationally. 261 people (17.2%) earned over $100,000 compared to 12.1% nationally. The employment status of those at least 15 was 747 (49.2%) full-time, 249 (16.4%) part-time, and 15 (1.0%) unemployed.

== Activities ==
It has access to lakeside activities and is more protected from the prevailing wind than the eastern lake shore. The nearest major retail centre is Taupō and many would regard it as now a suburb of this service and resort town. From 31 October 2022 it had buses to Taupō on Mondays, Wednesdays and Thursdays.

Acacia Bay is the location of the Tauhara Centre Trust, a retreat centre and pioneering centre in the revival of organic and biodynamic horticulture, which was moved to the site in 1977, and has proved historically to be attractive to overseas visitors. The trust has esoteric roots, having been founded in 1938 by amongst others, the widow of Dr. Robert Felkin, a noted member of the Stella Matutina Order and Order of the Golden Dawn.

== Geology ==
The bay is on the western shores of the present outlet to Lake Taupō and has given its name to the relatively small 9210 BCE (11.4 ka) Acacia Bay Taupō Volcano Unit D eruption as the vent was nearby to the south-east. This vent erupted the 500 m (1,600 ft) rhyolite Acacia Bay Dome behind the bay, producing a 0.05 cubic kilometres (0.012 cu mi) dome. Its lava contains geochemical markers that identify some of the magma body involved as from a remelt of products from the Whakamaru Caldera eruption of 335,000 years ago.

The most recent major Hatepe eruption of 1,800 years ago buried the entire area with a thick pumice-rich pyroclastic deposit which temporarily blocked the outlet to Lake Taupō, so that there is a terrace 34 m (112 ft) above the present lake level. Behind this is an even higher scarp/terrace at between 60 and 90 m (200 and 300 ft) above lake level that was formed after the 26,500 years ago Oruanui eruption when initially the new lake flowed out at Waihora 20 km (12 mi) to the west. If you come into the bay from the north on the road from Taupo the flat shoreline before you reach the bay is post eruption mobilised Hapete (Taupo) alluvium, with Hatepe (Taupo) ignimbrite and then Oruanui Ignimbrite covering the slope of the valley away from the lake. The northern promontory of the bay is formed from lava that erupted more than 100,000 years ago, with the township in the bay itself being built on deposits in the Huka Falls formation that also predated the Oruanui eruption. Behind the bay and above the main road is the rhyolite of the Acaia Bay Dome.
