= Taupō =

Town in the North Island of New Zealand

Taupō Taupō-nui-a-Tia (Māori)
- Secondary urban area
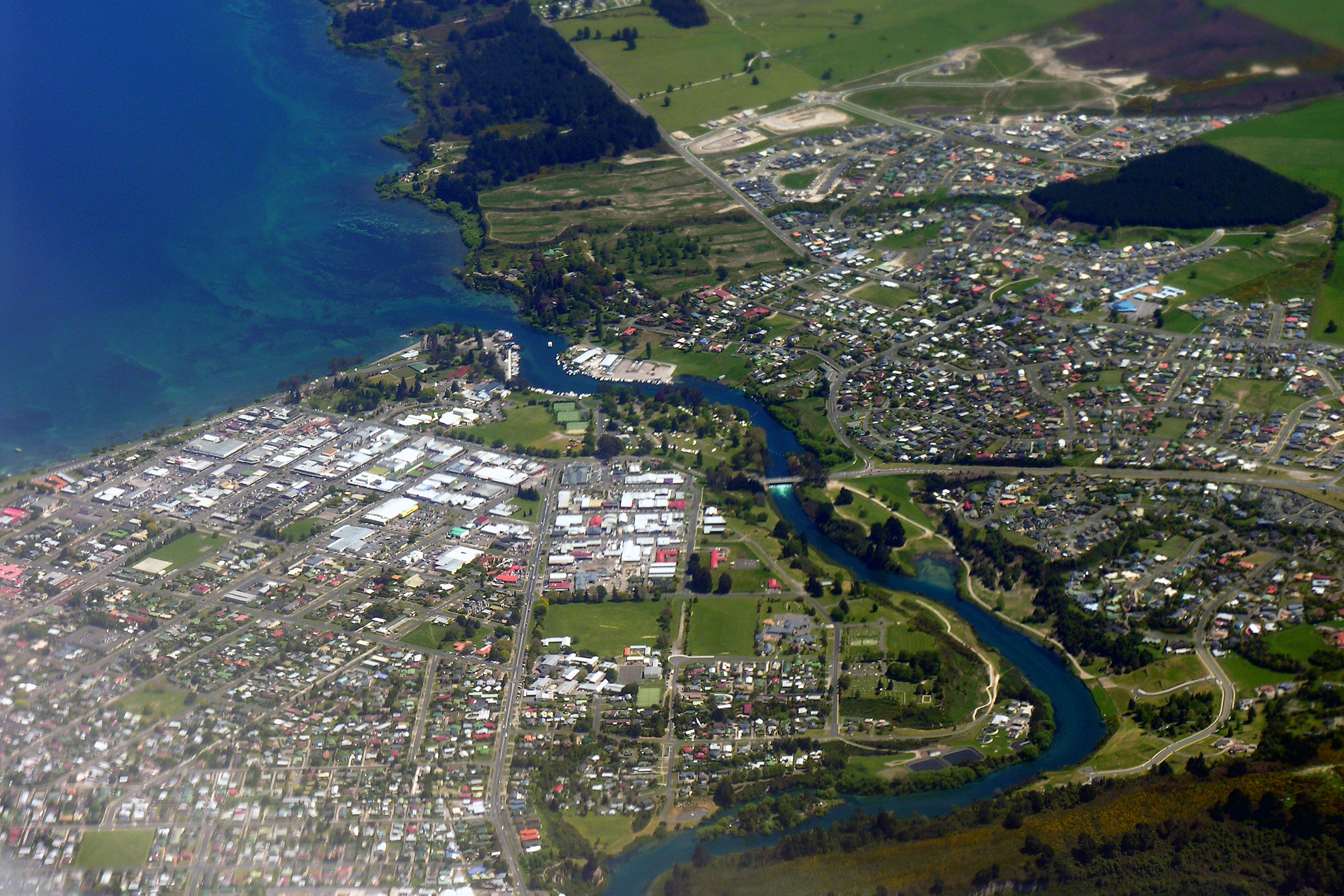

- Location within New Zealand
- Coordinates: 38.6875°S 176.0694°E
- Country: New Zealand
- Island: North Island
- Region: Waikato
- Territorial authority: Taupō District Council
- Ward: Taupō General Ward
- Settled: Pre-European
- Founded: 1869
- Borough status: 1953
- Named for: Originates from Taupō-nui-a-Tia, meaning "great cloak of Tia" in Māori
- Electorates: Taupō; Waiariki (Māori)

Government
  - Regional council: Waikato Regional Council
  - Mayor of Taupō: John Funnell
  - Taupō MP: Louise Upston
  - Waiariki MP: Rawiri Waititi

Area
  - Urban: 42.05 km^{2} (16.24 sq mi)
  - District: 6,970 km^{2} (2,690 sq mi)
- Elevation: 360 m (1,180 ft)

Population (June 2025)
  - Urban: 27,000
  - Urban density: 640/km^{2} (1,700/sq mi)
- Time zone: UTC+12 (NZST)
  - Summer (DST): UTC+13 (NZDT)
- Postcode: 3330
- Area code: 07
- Local iwi: Ngāti Tūwharetoa

Taupō, (Note: /ˈtaʊpoʊ/ or /ˈtoʊpɔː/; Māori pronunciation: [taʉpɔː]) sometimes written as Taupo, is a town located in the central North Island of New Zealand. It is situated on the north-eastern edge of Lake Taupō, which is the largest freshwater lake in New Zealand. Taupō was constituted as a borough in 1953. It has been the seat of Taupō District Council since the council was formed in 1989.

Taupō is the largest urban area in the Taupō District, and the second-largest in the Waikato region, behind Hamilton. It has a population of approximately 27,000 (June 2025). Taupō is known for its natural beauty, with the surrounding area offering a range of outdoor recreational activities such as hiking, fishing, skiing, and water sports. Visitors can also enjoy a variety of attractions, including the Wairakei Power Station, Huka Falls, and the Tongariro National Park.

== Naming ==
The name Taupō is from the Māori language and is a shortened version of Taupō-nui-a-Tia. The longer name was first given to the cliff at Pākā Bay, on the eastern shore of the lake, and means the "great cloak of Tia". It was named for Tia, the Māori explorer who discovered the lake. Māori later applied the name to the lake itself. In 2019 the official name of the town was changed from Taupo to Taupō.

Although the English pronunciation "tow-po" (/ˈtaʊpoʊ/, NZE /ˈtæʊpaʉ/) is widespread, it is often regarded as incorrect, and the Māori pronunciation, "toe-paw" (/ˈtoʊpɔː/, NZE /ˈtaʉpoː/) is generally preferred in formal use.

== History ==
Approximately 700 years ago, Maori settlement of the Lake Taupō region occurred. Maori settled along the Waikato River, the lake shores and on forest edges. Europeans first visited Taupō around 1839.

In 1868, an armed constabulary post was established in Taupō in order to strengthen communication lines in the central North Island. A redoubt (or fort) was built by the armed constabulary in 1870 to guard a crossing of the Waikato river next to where it joined Lake Taupō. It was designed for up to 150 men although generally between 15 and 40 men were present during the early 1870s. This redoubt was located on the opposite bank to the Ngāti Tūwharetoa pā at Nukuhau (now called Redoubt Street). A courthouse was built in 1881 close to the Armed Constabulary redoubt. In 1886, the armed constabulary were replace by a civil police force.

Hot water pools around Taupō began to attract tourists to Taupō in the late 1870s and early 1880s and hotels were developed to take advantage of this. In the 1890s, rainbow trout were introduced to Lake Taupō and Taupō became a popular town to stay and fish.

A road board was established in 1922 and it was made a borough in 1953.

The control gates bridge that spans the Waikato river and link the northern and southern suburbs of the Taupō were completed in 1941. The bridge contains six control gates to adjust the flow of the Waikato River to the nine hydroelectric power stations down river of Taupo.

Taupō grew quickly due to the development of the Wairakei geothermal power station, located 7km north of Taupō, which was commissioned in 1958 and completed in 1963. Also significant was expansion of the timber industry and farm development occurred between 1949 and 1953.

Farming in the region was initially unsuccessful with a wasting illness which affected sheep and cattle given the name "bush sickness". Scientific study of the soil identified that there was a Cobalt deficiency in the soil. Once the soil was fertilized, farming in the region was successful. Sheep numbers in the district increased to 138,600 with more than 20 sheep farms and 300 dairy farms established between 1947 and 1954.

The population of Taupō was 753 people in 1945; 1,358 in 1951, later increasing to 2,849 people in 1956 and 5,251 people in 1961.

Further geothermal power stations were built surrounding Taupo including the Poihipi power station which was completed in 1997 and purchased by Contact Energy in 2000; Te Mihi, completed in 2014 and the Tauhara power station which was completed in 2024.

== Geographical features ==
Taupō is located on the northeastern shore of Lake Taupō, New Zealand's largest lake, which is itself in the caldera of the Taupō Volcano. The Waikato River drains the lake and runs through the town, separating the CBD and the northern suburbs. The river flows over the Huka Falls, a short distance north of the town, Taupō is a centre of volcanic and geothermal activity, and hot springs suitable for bathing are located at several places in the vicinity. The volcanic Mount Tauhara lies six kilometres (4 mi) to the east. Taupo is 153km south west of Hamilton; 80km south of Rotorua and 50km north of Turangi.

Somewhat to the northeast are significant hot springs. These springs contain extremophile micro-organisms that live in extremely hot environments.

The small but growing satellite town of Kinloch, where there is a golf course designed by Jack Nicklaus, is 20 kilometres west along the lake.

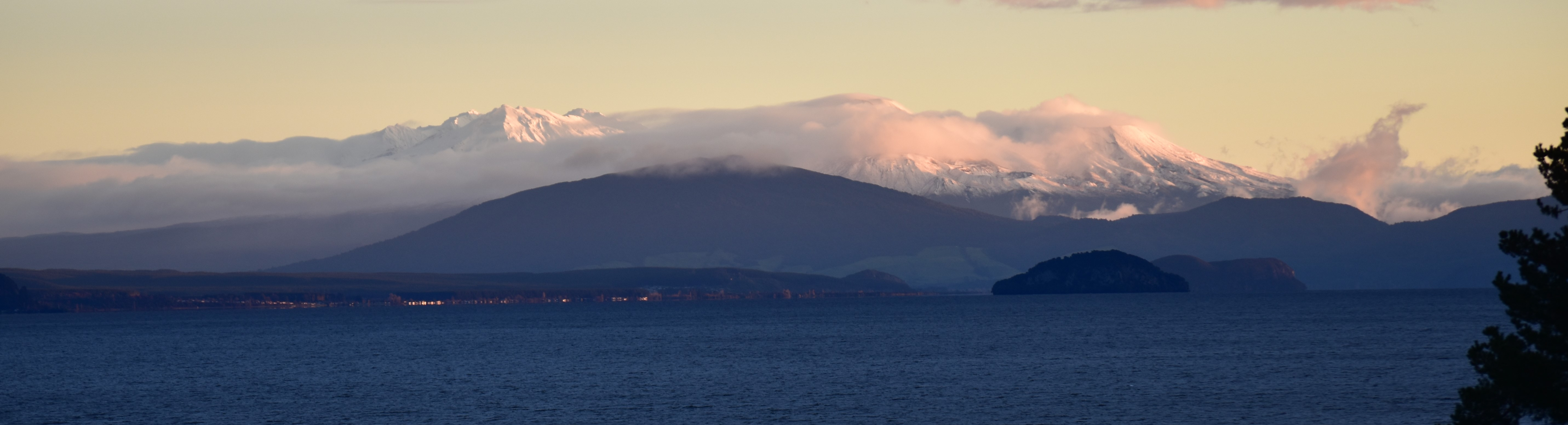
View of snow-capped mountains shrouded in cloud, Taupō

=== Suburbs ===
Taupō suburbs include:

- Wharewaka – has a popular swimming spot for locals and a growing new subdivision along with a large retirement village.
- Nukuhau – lies north of the Waikato River. To the south-west lies Acacia Bay and to the south lies Taupō town centre.
- Richmond Heights – lies to the east of Rainbow Point and south of Mountain View. It is home to the Richmond Heights shopping centre.
- Waipahihi – lies to the north of Richmond Heights. It is home to the Waipahihi Primary School, and the Waipahihi Botanical Gardens.
- Mount View – lies north of the Taupō CBD
- Acacia Bay – lies west of Tapuaeharuru Bay
- Rainbow Point – lies north of Wharewaka and west of Richmond Heights. To the west lies Lake Taupō.
- Tauhara – lies just north of Hilltop and east of Mount View. Mount Tauhara lies just east of Tauhara. Tauhara is the location of Tauhara primary school, Tauhara College and Tauhara Golf course.
- Hilltop – lies south of Tauhara. Hilltop is the location of Hilltop School, Taupo Intermediate School, Taupō Hospital, Taharepa shopping centre and Hilltop shopping centre.
- Taupō CBD

Outer suburbs

- Five Mile Bay – is located on the east side of Lake Taupō, south of Wharewaka and north of Waitahanui on State Highway 1 just west of Taupō Airport. It is a popular swimming/water skiing beach that is very busy in summer. Five Mile Bay is one of three similar named bays along the lake shoreline, the others being Two Mile Bay and Three Mile Bay.
- Wairakei – is a small settlement, and geothermal area 8-kilometres north of Taupō.
- Waitahanui – is a village on the eastern shore of Lake Taupō.

=== Climate ===
Taupō has an oceanic climate (Cfb). The town is located inland, which results in the accumulation of dry air causing severe frost during winter. However snowfall in Taupō is rare. The summer climate in Taupō is mild with maximum average temperature reaching 23 degrees and a minimum average temperature of 10 degrees.

Climate data for Taupō (1991–2020 normals, extremes 1949–present)
Month	Jan	Feb	Mar	Apr	May	Jun	Jul	Aug	Sep	Oct	Nov	Dec	Year
Record high °C (°F)	33.2 (91.8)	33.0 (91.4)	28.9 (84.0)	25.2 (77.4)	23.0 (73.4)	18.8 (65.8)	17.2 (63.0)	19.5 (67.1)	23.8 (74.8)	27.6 (81.7)	32.8 (91.0)	30.8 (87.4)	33.2 (91.8)
Mean maximum °C (°F)	27.5 (81.5)	27.0 (80.6)	25.1 (77.2)	21.5 (70.7)	18.5 (65.3)	15.8 (60.4)	14.4 (57.9)	15.3 (59.5)	18.0 (64.4)	20.5 (68.9)	23.3 (73.9)	25.6 (78.1)	28.3 (82.9)
Mean daily maximum °C (°F)	23.0 (73.4)	23.0 (73.4)	20.7 (69.3)	17.4 (63.3)	14.4 (57.9)	11.9 (53.4)	11.1 (52.0)	12.0 (53.6)	13.9 (57.0)	16.0 (60.8)	18.3 (64.9)	20.9 (69.6)	16.9 (62.4)
Daily mean °C (°F)	17.3 (63.1)	17.4 (63.3)	15.2 (59.4)	12.3 (54.1)	9.8 (49.6)	7.6 (45.7)	6.8 (44.2)	7.5 (45.5)	9.2 (48.6)	11.2 (52.2)	13.1 (55.6)	15.7 (60.3)	11.9 (53.4)
Mean daily minimum °C (°F)	11.6 (52.9)	11.9 (53.4)	9.8 (49.6)	7.2 (45.0)	5.2 (41.4)	3.3 (37.9)	2.5 (36.5)	3.0 (37.4)	4.6 (40.3)	6.4 (43.5)	7.8 (46.0)	10.6 (51.1)	7.0 (44.6)
Mean minimum °C (°F)	3.1 (37.6)	3.5 (38.3)	1.0 (33.8)	−1.0 (30.2)	−2.6 (27.3)	−4.1 (24.6)	−4.4 (24.1)	−4.1 (24.6)	−2.9 (26.8)	−2.1 (28.2)	−0.5 (31.1)	2.0 (35.6)	−5.1 (22.8)
Record low °C (°F)	−1.5 (29.3)	−1.0 (30.2)	−1.5 (29.3)	−4.7 (23.5)	−5.3 (22.5)	−6.2 (20.8)	−7.1 (19.2)	−6.6 (20.1)	−5.3 (22.5)	−5.1 (22.8)	−4.2 (24.4)	−1.7 (28.9)	−7.1 (19.2)
Average rainfall mm (inches)	73.4 (2.89)	64.8 (2.55)	65.9 (2.59)	77.3 (3.04)	79.4 (3.13)	93.0 (3.66)	99.8 (3.93)	88.6 (3.49)	79.0 (3.11)	74.2 (2.92)	64.7 (2.55)	88.0 (3.46)	948.1 (37.32)
Average rainy days (≥ 1.0 mm)	6.9	6.3	7.1	8.2	8.8	10.5	11.2	11.7	10.8	10.1	8.7	9.5	109.8
Average relative humidity (%)	76.9	78.5	81.1	83.0	87.1	88.5	88.6	86.1	81.4	80.3	76.4	77.0	82.1
Mean monthly sunshine hours	224.3	202.6	179.7	156.3	126.3	96.1	116.5	134.6	140.0	179.6	190.4	204.6	1,950.9
Mean daily daylight hours	14.5	13.6	12.3	11.1	10.0	9.5	9.8	10.7	11.9	13.1	14.2	14.8	12.1
Percentage possible sunshine	50	53	47	47	41	34	34	41	39	44	45	45	43
Source 1: NIWA Climate Data (sun 1981–2010)
Source 2: Weather Spark

== Demographics ==
Taupō is described by Statistics New Zealand as a medium urban area and covers 42.05 km^{2} (16.24 sq mi), which stretches from Acacia Bay in the west to Centennial Park in the east and to Taupō Airport in the south. The Taupō urban area had an estimated population of 27,000 as of June 2025, with a population density of 642.09 people per km^{2}. It is the 26th-largest urban area in New Zealand, and the second-largest in the Waikato Region behind Hamilton.

Historical population
Year	Pop.	±% p.a.
1996	19,000	—
2001	20,400	+1.43%
2006	20,694	+0.29%
2013	21,123	+0.29%
2018	23,622	+2.26%
2023	25,374	+1.44%
The 2006 population is for a larger area of 42.94 km^{2}. Earlier figures may use different boundaries. Source:

Taupō had a population of 25,374 in the 2023 New Zealand census, an increase of 1,752 people (7.4%) since the 2018 census, and an increase of 4,251 people (20.1%) since the 2013 census. There were 12,429 males, 12,882 females, and 66 people of other genders in 9,711 dwellings. 2.4% of people identified as LGBTIQ+. The median age was 42.4 years (compared with 38.1 years nationally). There were 4,695 people (18.5%) aged under 15 years, 4,008 (15.8%) aged 15 to 29, 11,103 (43.8%) aged 30 to 64, and 5,571 (22.0%) aged 65 or older.

People could identify as more than one ethnicity. The results were 77.6% European (Pākehā); 25.6% Māori; 3.8% Pasifika; 7.8% Asian; 0.9% Middle Eastern, Latin American and African New Zealanders (MELAA); and 2.7% other, which includes people giving their ethnicity as "New Zealander". English was spoken by 97.2%, Māori by 5.7%, Samoan by 0.5%, and other languages by 8.8%. No language could be spoken by 1.8% (e.g. too young to talk). New Zealand Sign Language was known by 0.5%. The percentage of people born overseas was 20.1, compared with 28.8% nationally.

Religious affiliations were 30.7% Christian, 1.8% Hindu, 0.3% Islam, 2.6% Māori religious beliefs, 0.7% Buddhist, 0.4% New Age, 0.1% Jewish, and 1.4% other religions. People who answered that they had no religion were 54.7%, and 7.5% of people did not answer the census question.

Of those at least 15 years old, 3,846 (18.6%) people had a bachelor's or higher degree, 11,934 (57.7%) had a post-high school certificate or diploma, and 4,908 (23.7%) people exclusively held high school qualifications. The median income was $41,500, compared with $41,500 nationally. 2,112 people (10.2%) earned over $100,000 compared to 12.1% nationally. The employment status of those at least 15 was 10,380 (50.2%) full-time, 2,964 (14.3%) part-time, and 429 (2.1%) unemployed.

Individual statistical areas
Name	Area (km^{2})	Population	Density (per km^{2})	Dwellings	Median age	Median income
Acacia Bay	7.15	1,770	248	702	52.5 years	$49,600
Brentwood	3.56	2,178	612	885	50.1 years	$38,700
Nukuhau	0.81	1,560	1,926	606	39.1 years	$42,100
Rangatira Park	2.04	1,122	550	501	53.3 years	$38,800
Taupō Central West	1.36	390	287	177	39.9 years	$43,800
Tauhara	1.85	1,689	913	579	32.6 years	$39,000
Centennial	9.86	87	9	30	41.4 years	$51,200
Taupō Central East	1.09	2,457	2,254	918	38.0 years	$35,900
Mountview	1.13	2,838	2,512	999	33.9 years	$41,500
Bird Area	1.18	2,193	1,858	897	45.5 years	$43,300
Hilltop	1.61	1,950	1,211	711	46.0 years	$40,800
Invergarry	0.89	828	930	294	37.5 years	$39,100
Waipahihi	2.47	2,292	928	894	47.2 years	$45,200
Richmond Heights	1.37	2,403	1,754	855	37.7 years	$44,100
Wharewaka	5.70	1,614	283	663	52.2 years	$40,600
New Zealand					38.1 years	$41,500

== Economy ==
Taupō is a tourist centre, particularly in the summer, as it offers panoramic views over the lake and to the volcanic mountains of Tongariro National Park to the south. It offers a number of tourist activities including sky diving, jetboating, parasailing, and bungy jumping. Craters of the Moon is a geothermal valley where it is possible to see bubbling mud and steam released from underground geothermal activity.

Taupō services a number of surrounding plantation pine forests including the large Kaingaroa Forest and related industry. A large sawmill is sited approximated 3 km to the north east of the town on Centennial Drive.

Taupō is surrounded by seven geothermal power stations including the historic Wairakei geothermal power station a few kilometres north of the town.

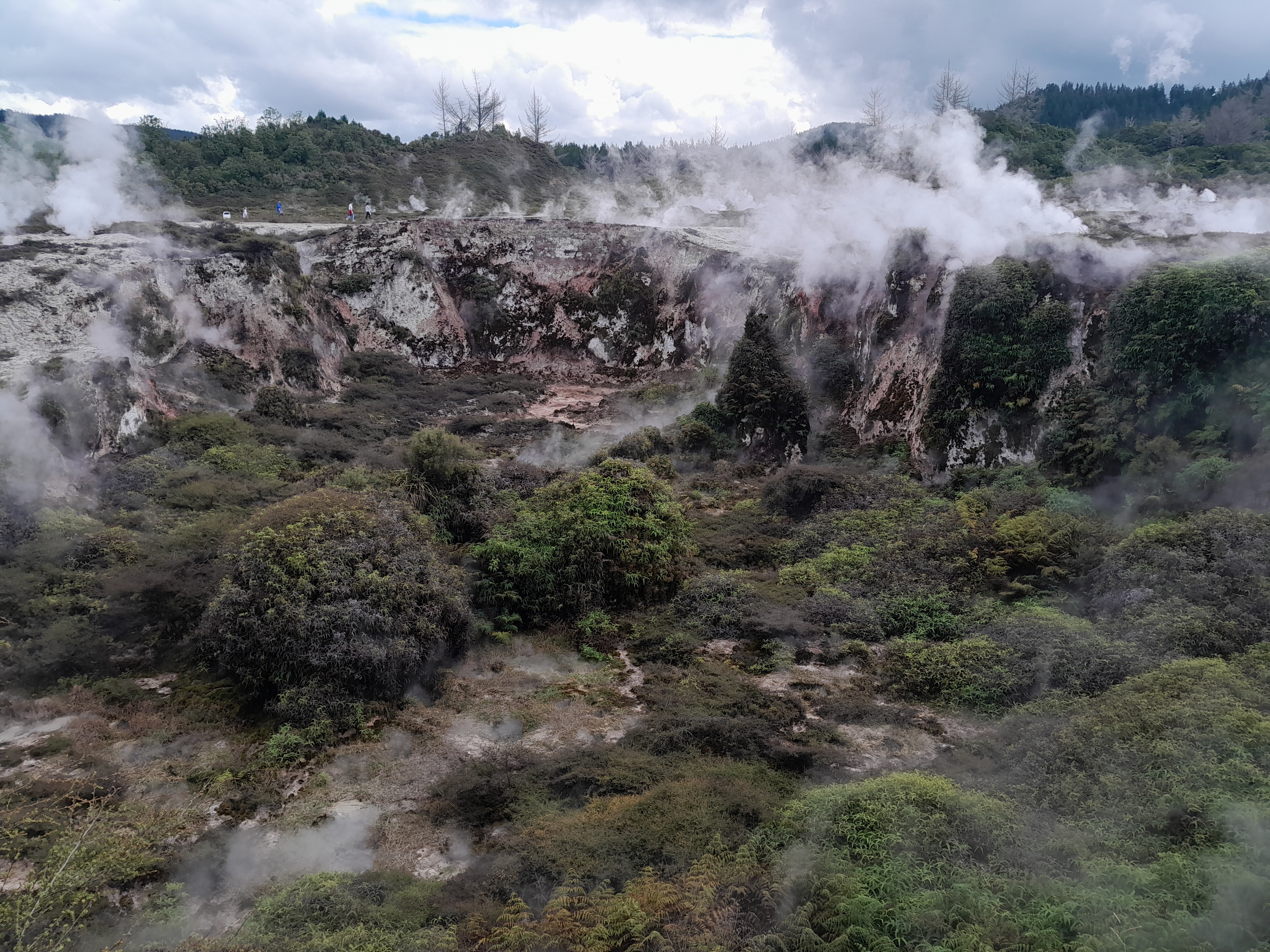
Steam rising from the Craters of the Moon geothermal park, Taupo (2025)

Taupō has a McDonald's with a decommissioned Douglas DC-3 attached to the store. The fast food outlet has seating inside the plane's structure.

== Governance ==
The Taupō district council provides local government services for Taupō. Taupō is part of the Taupō electorate and the current member of parliament (as of 2023) is Louise Upston.

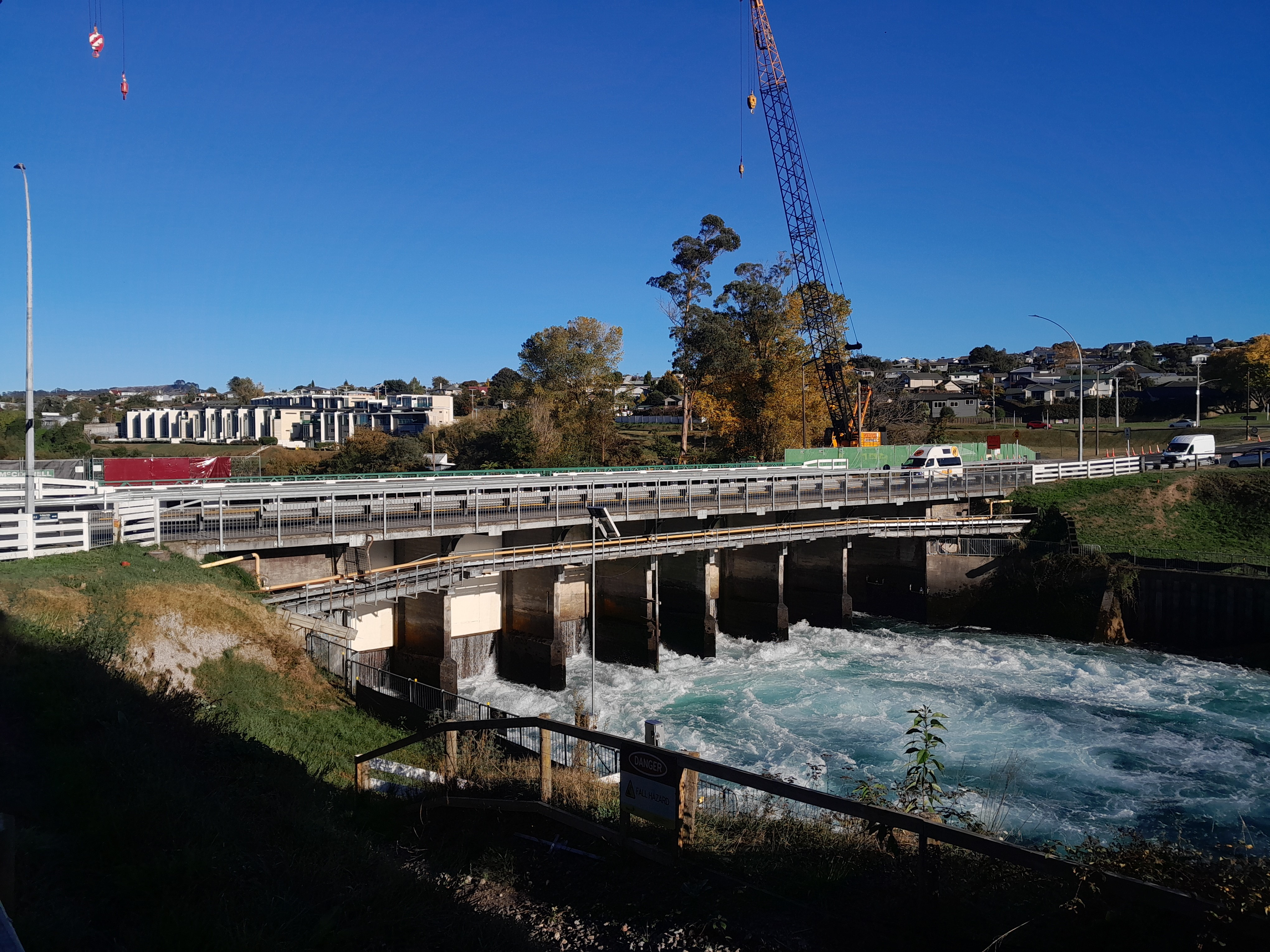
Control gates at the juncture of Lake Taupo and the Waikato River (2025) These were originally completed in 1941.

== Museum ==
The Taupō museum is located in the centre of the town on Story Place. It has displays including about the Ngāti Tūwharetoa, a Wharenui (Māori Meeting House) which was carved locally between 1927 and 1928, a moa skeleton and a caravan filled with local memorabilia from the late 1950s and early 1960s. There are also displays about volcanos and art galleries.

== Sports and recreation ==
Regular sporting events in Taupō include Ironman New Zealand, the Lake Taupō Cycle Challenge and the Great Lake Relay (established in 1995). The Lake Taupō Cycle Challenge has about 5,000 riders. The Oxfam Trailwalker has been held in Taupō several times. In 2006 Taupō was also the location of the off-road motorcycle event FIM International Six Day Enduro.

=== Mountain biking ===
The International Mountain Bicycling Association has designated Bike Taupo's trail network as a silver-level IMBA Ride Center, which represents the organization's highest rating for trail experiences.

=== Owen Delany park ===
Owen Delany park is a multi-purpose sports ground in Taupō. It has a capacity of 30,000 people and includes six sports fields; Cricket – four grass cricket blocks and six artificial wickets; a 400 metre athletic track; ten netball courts and a velodrome.

=== Golf ===
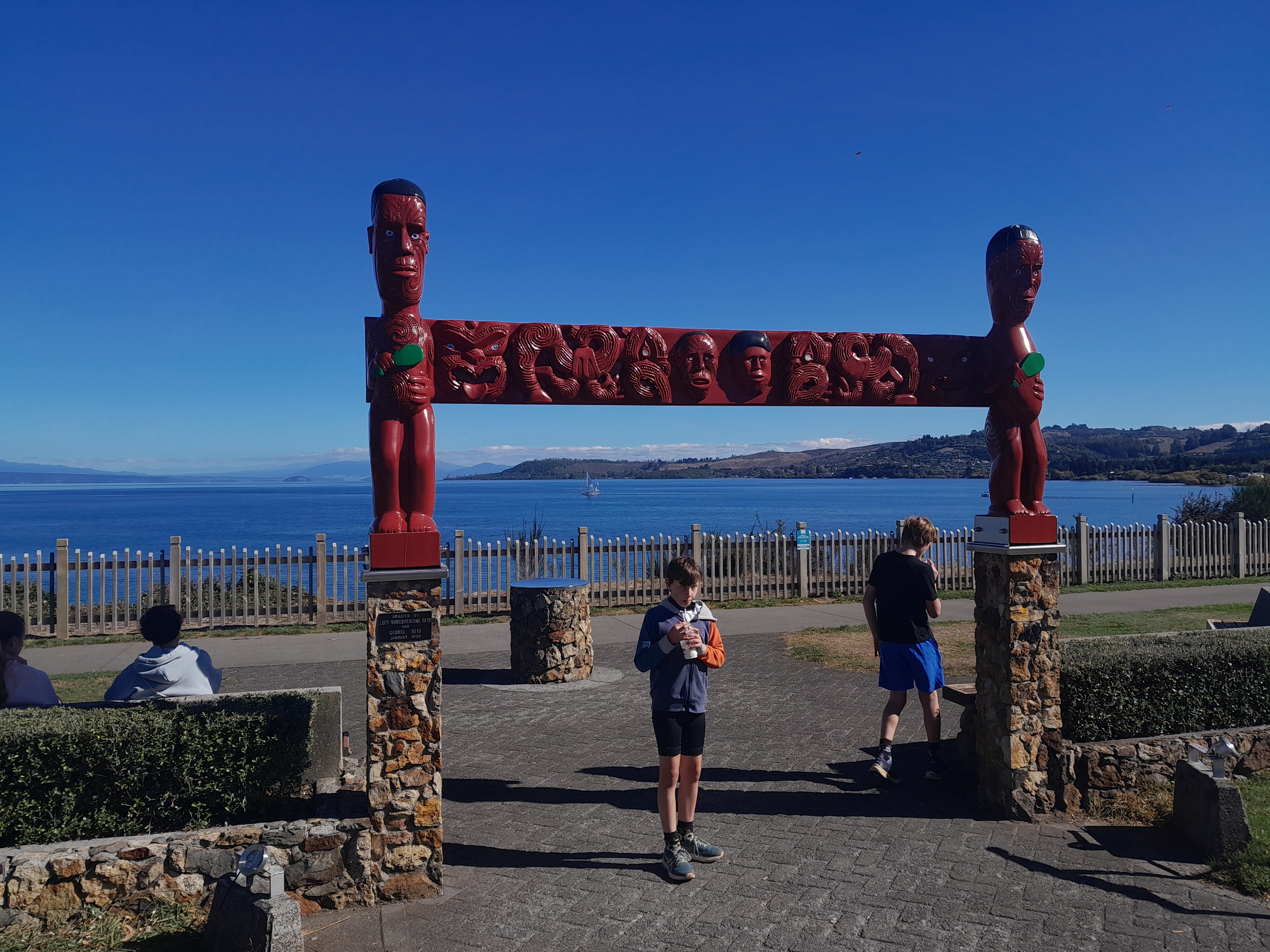
Taupo lake front (2025)

Taupō is home to the Taupo Golf Club which has two courses: the Tauhara golf course and the Centennial course. Other golf courses located near Taupō include Wairakei Golf + Sanctuary, the Kinloch Club Golf Course and the Reporoa Golf Club.

=== Motorsports ===
Taupō is home to the Taupo International Motorsport Park. It has a full international-standard racing circuit.

=== Swimming pool ===
The AC Baths is a swimming pool complex located at 26 AC Baths Avenue. Facilities include two 25-metre lane pools, an outdoor leisure pool with two toddler areas, a sauna, two hydroslides and four private thermal mineral pools.

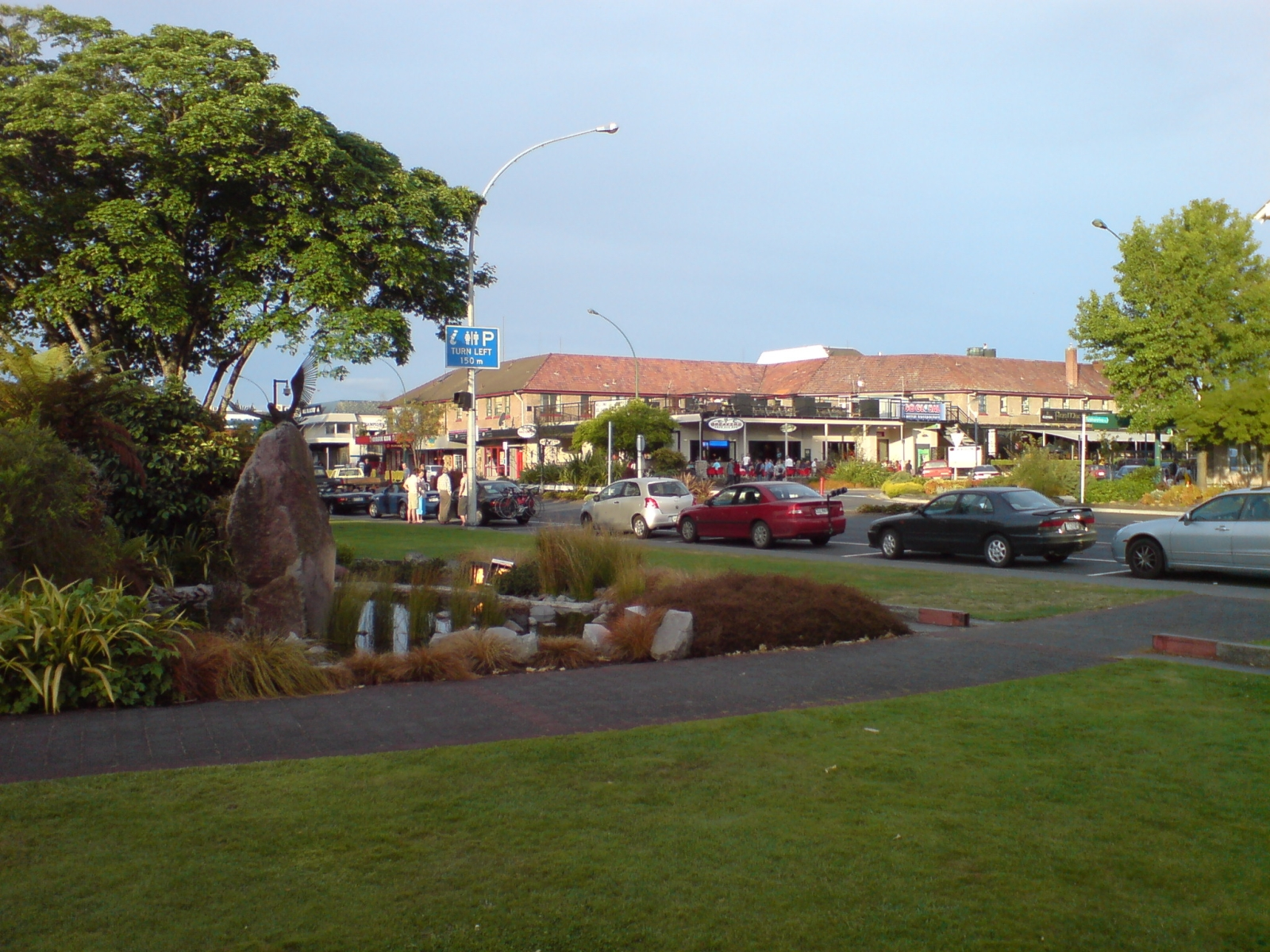
One of the main streets of the Taupō CBD, with the Taupo Domain on the left

== Education ==
Taupō has four high schools: Tauhara College, Taupo-nui-a-Tia College, Māori immersion Te Kura Kaupapa Māori o Whakarewa i Te Reo ki Tuwharetoa and state integrated Lake Taupo Christian School. It also has Wairakei, St Patrick's, Waipahihi, Hilltop, Mount View, Taupō and Tauhara primary schools, and Taupo Intermediate School.

== Infrastructure and services ==
=== Transport ===
Taupō is served by State Highway 1 and State Highway 5, and is on the Thermal Explorer Highway touring route. All three highways run concurrently along the Eastern Taupō Arterial, which was built in 2010.

Taupō is one of the few large towns in New Zealand that have never had a link to the national rail network, although there have been proposals in the past.

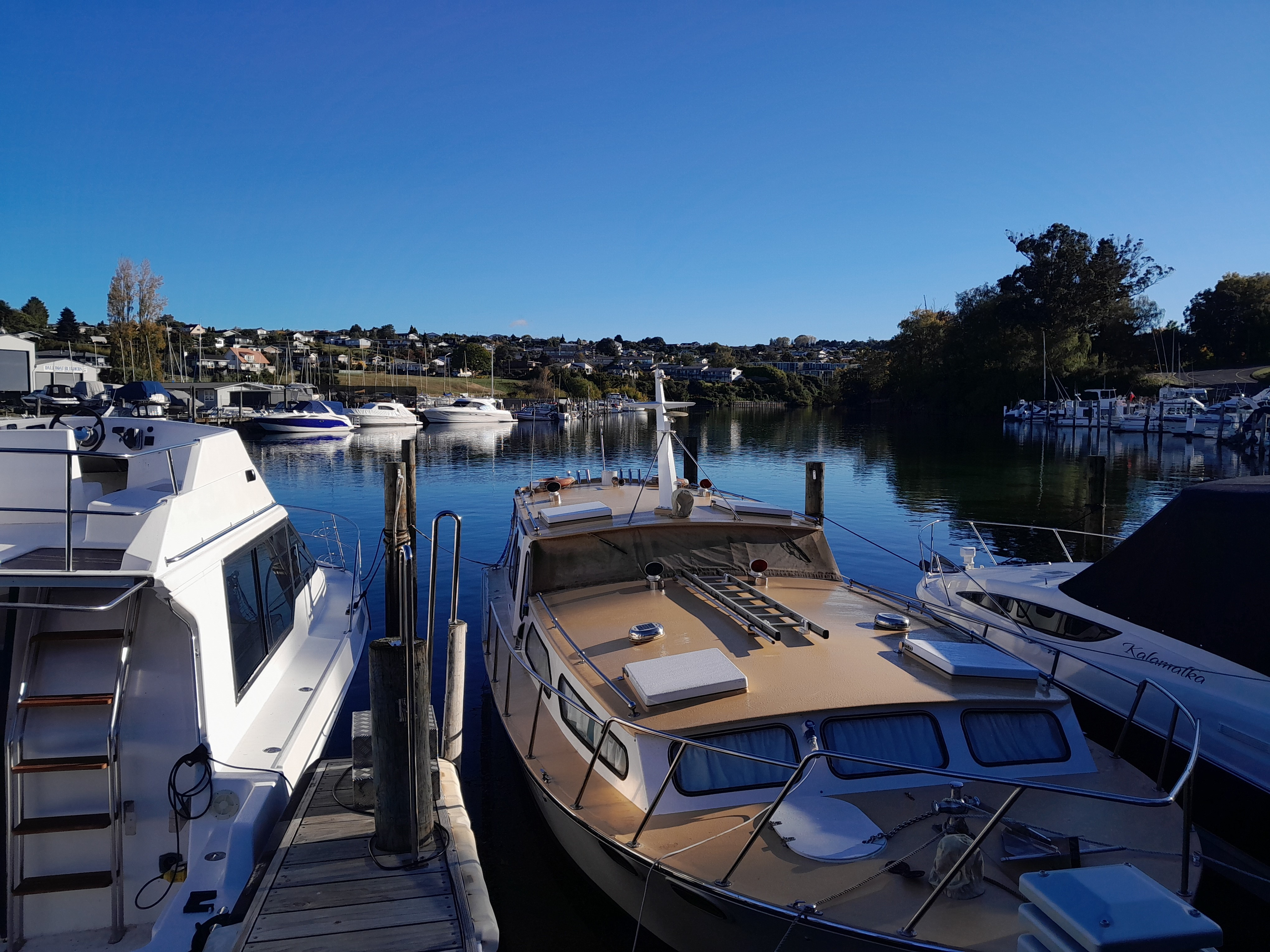
Lake Taupo Marina, situated in the Waikato River upstream of the control gates (2025)

Taupō Airport is located south of the township. Scheduled services to Auckland operate from the airport.

=== Utilities ===
Taupō first received a public electricity supply in 1952, with the commissioning of the Hinemaiaia A hydroelectric power station south of the town. The town was connected to the national grid in 1958, coinciding with the commissioning of Wairakei geothermal power station north of the town. Today, Unison Networks owns and operates the electricity distribution network in Taupō.

Natural gas arrived in Taupō in 1987. First Gas operates the gas distribution network in the town.

Taupō's fresh water supply is drawn from Lake Taupō. Prior to 2013, there were two separate fresh water systems serving the town: the Lake Terrace system serving the town north of Napier Road, and the Rainbow Point system serving the southern suburbs. In 2013, the Lake Terrace treatment plant was upgraded and the two systems were amalgamated. Acacia Bay has its own dedicated fresh water system.

=== Media ===
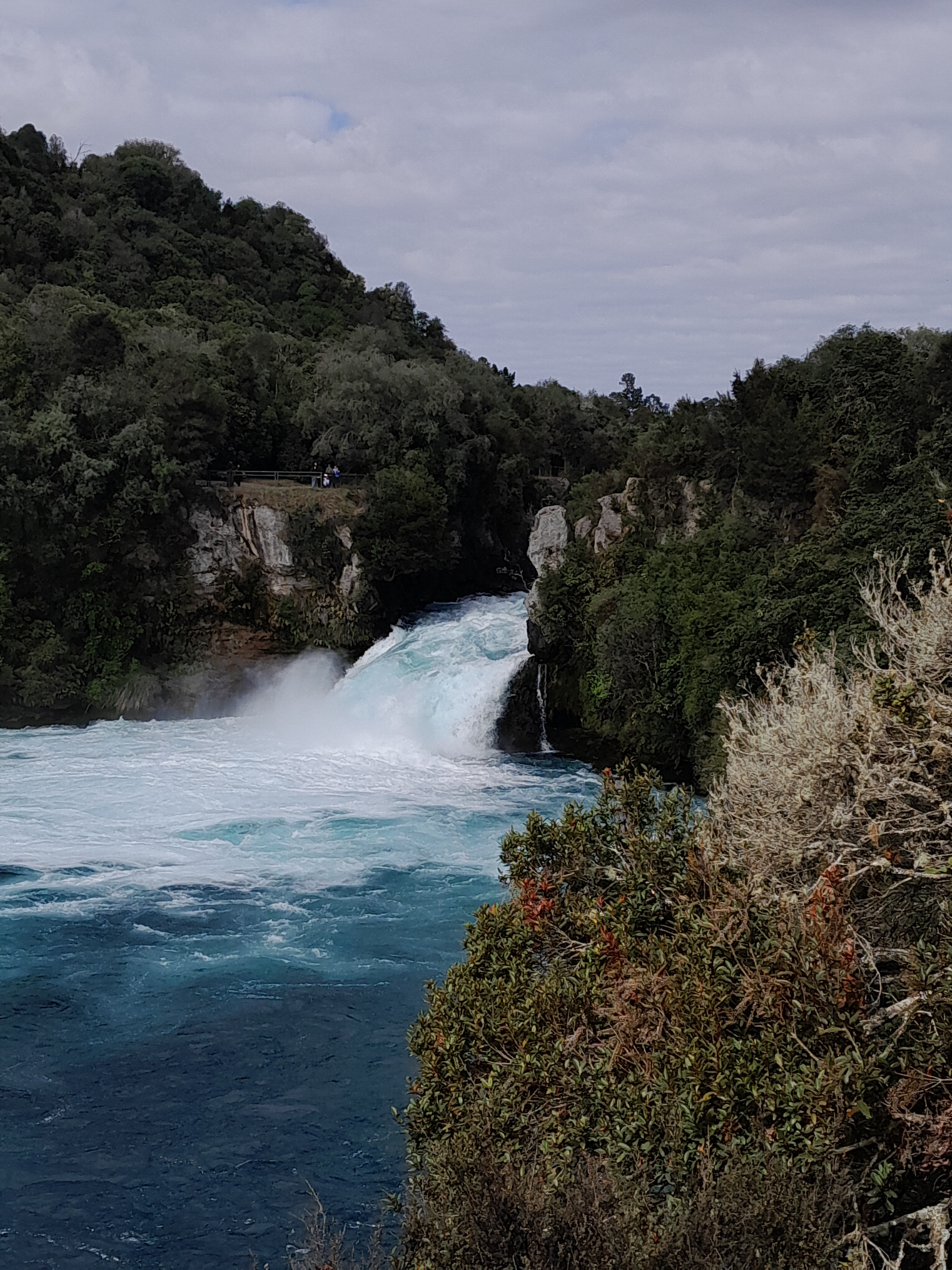
Huka Falls, Taupo (2025)

The local newspaper Taupō Times was owned by Stuff. On Stuff websites the last Taupō Times was on 28 June 2024, though Taupō & Tūrangi News is now published independently, following a buyout by its editor and a further change of ownership in January 2025. There is also a local radio station. Digitisation of the Taupō Times from 1952 was undertaken in a partnership between The Preserving Local History and Educational Trust and Taupō Museum and Art Gallery.

== Notable people ==
- Patrick Bevin (born 1991), road racing cyclist
- Bevan Docherty (born 1977), Olympic triathlete
- Tumu Te Heuheu Tūkino VIII (1941–2025), Māori Paramount Chief
- James Tito actor and musician
- Nicole van der Kaay (born 1996) Olympic triathlete
- Louisa Wall (born 1972), member of parliament and former national representative netball and rugby union player
- Hayden Wilde (born 1997), Olympic triathlete

== Twin cities ==
Taupō is twinned with:

- Hakone, Japan
- Kulim, Malaysia
- Nouméa, New Caledonia
- Suzhou, China
- Xi'an, China

== See also ==
- Owen Delany Park
- Taupō railway proposals
- Taupo Borough Council v Birnie
