= Taupo-nui-a-Tia College =

Location
- 122 Spa Road; Taupō; New Zealand; 38.6816°S 176.0797°E

Information
- Type: Co-ed state secondary
- Motto: Kia Kaha
- Established: 1960
- Ministry of Education Institution no.: 167
- Principal: Ben Claxton
- Years offered: 9–13
- Enrolment: 1,198 (July 2026)
- Socio-economic decile: 5M
- Website: taupocollege.ac.nz

Taupo-nui-a-Tia College is a co-educational high school in Taupō, New Zealand. The school currently has about 1131 students. Taupo-nui-a-Tia College is a Cornerstone Values school.

== History ==
Ben Claxton replaced Peter Moyle as school principal in 2022

In February 2026 a block of classrooms was destroyed by fire.

== Enrolment ==
As of July 2026, Taupo-nui-a-Tia College has a roll of 1,198 students, of which 387 (32.3%) identify as Māori.

As of 2026, the school has an Equity Index of 463, placing it amongst schools whose students have average socioeconomic barriers to achievement (roughly equivalent to deciles 5 and 6 under the former socio-economic decile system).

== Notable alumni ==
- Paula Bennett – 18th Deputy Prime Minister of New Zealand
- David Hamilton – New Zealand Composer
- Louisa Wall – Member of Parliament
- Lee Stensness – All Black
- Hud Rickit – All Black
- Shiloh Gloyn – Black Stick
- Nicole van der Kaay – Triathlete
- Mani Mitchell – Activist
