= List of people with given name Susan =

This is a list of notable people with the given name Susan.

== People ==
- Susan (Iranian singer) (1942–2004), born Golandam Taherkhani, Iranian singer
- Susan (Japanese singer), pop singer who recorded in Japan in the early 1980s
- Susan, Lady Renouf (1942–2016), Australian socialite
- Susan, Lady St Helier (1845–1931), London County Council alderman
- Susan Ariel Aaronson, American author, public speaker, and academic
- Susan Abod (born 1951), American feminist activist and musician
- Susan Abulhawa (born 1970), Palestinian-American writer and human rights activist
- Susan Aceron (1972–2016), Canadian actress and businesswoman
- Susan Africa (born 1959), Filipina actress, host, and beauty queen
- Susan Aglukark (born 1967), Inuk musician
- Susan Aho (born 1974), Finnish singer
- Susan Aitken, Scottish National Party politician
- Susan Alberts, American primatologist, anthropologist, and biologist
- Susan Albright, American journalist and editor
- Susan Alexander-Max, American-born British fortepianist
- Susan Alexjander, American sound artist, musical composer, and teacher
- Susan Allen (disambiguation)
- Susan Almy (born 1946), New Hampshire politician
- Susan Amara, American professor of neuroscience
- Susan B. Anthony (1820–1906), American feminist and suffragist
- Susan Anton (born 1950), American actress
- Susan Arnold (born 1954), American businesswoman
- Susan Atefat-Peckham (1970–2004), Iranian-American poet
- Susan Austin, American politician
- Susan Avery (born 1950), American atmospheric physicist
- Susan Avingaq, Inuk Canadian film director, producer, screenwriter, and actress
- Susan Backlinie (1946–2024), American actress and stuntwoman
- Susan Badders (born 1951), American fencer
- Susan Baer (1950–2016), American public servant
- Susan Bailey (born 1950), British psychiatrist and academic
- Susan Baker (born 1955), British professor of political science
- Susan Hammond Barney (1834–1922), American evangelist, writer
- Susan Bay (born 1943), American actress
- Susan Bernal (born 1982), Colombian materials scientist
- Susan Bertie, Countess of Kent (1554–?), English aristocrat
- Sue Bird (born 1980), American basketball player
- Susan Bissell, Canadian academic, UNICEF's Child Protection Section chief
- Susan Black, several people
- Susan Boyle (born 1961), Scottish singer
- Susan Brookes (born 1943), English television chef
- Susan Brooks (born 1960), American prosecutor and politician
- Susan Brown, several people
- Susan Brownmiller (1935–2025), American journalist, author and feminist activist
- Susan Buchan, Baroness Tweedsmuir DStJ (1882–1977), British writer and the wife of author John Buchan
- Susan Alice Buffett (born 1953), daughter of Warren Buffett
- Susan Cain (born 1968), American author of Quiet: The Power of Introverts... and Bittersweet
- Susan Calman (born 1974), Scottish comedian
- Susan Cameron (born 1958), American businessperson who is the former chairman, president, and CEO of Reynolds American, Inc
- Susan Carlson (born 1969), American former television reporter
- Susan Carroll, several people
- Susan Cheever (born 1943), American author
- Susan Chomba, Kenyan scientist and environmentalist
- Susan Cole, several people
- Susan Collett (born 1961), Canadian artist
- Susan Jane Colley (born 1959), American mathematician
- Susan Collins (born 1952), American politician
- Susan Cookson (born 1965), British actress
- Susan Cooper (born 1935), English author
- Susan Coppersmith (born 1957), American physicist
- Susan Crawford, several people
- Susan Elizabeth Wood Crocker (1836–?), American physician
- Susan Crowen, (1821–1870), American writer
- Susan Danby, Australian researcher
- Susan B. Davidson American computer scientist
- Susan Shaw Devesa (born 1944), American cancer epidemiologist
- Susan Dew Hoff (1842–1933), American physician
- Susan Ann Dimock, Canadian philosopher and professor
- Susan DuBose, American politician from Alabama
- Susan Cushman (born 1972), Canadian rhythmic gymnast
- Susan Darcy (born 1956), American test pilot
- Susan Davis, several people
- Susan Topliff Davis (1862–1931), American non-profit executive
- Susan Dey (born 1952), American actress
- Susan Douglas, several people
- Susan Egelstaff (born 1982), Scottish badminton player
- Susan S. Ellenberg, American biostatistician
- Susan Engberg (1940–2021), American novelist
- Susan Enriquez, Filipina broadcast journalist
- Susan Faludi (born 1959), American feminist, journalist, and author
- Susan Frances Nelson Ferree (1844–1919), American journalist, temperance worker and social activist
- Susan Fessenden (1840–1932), American activist, reformer
- Susan Fiske (born 1952), American psychologist
- Susan Ford, daughter of the U.S. President Gerald Ford
- Susan Forrest, Australian genomics expert
- Susan Braley Franklin (1868–1955), American classical scholar and educator
- Susan Fuentes (1954–2013), Filipina singer
- Susan B. Ganong (1873–1961), Canadian educator and proprietor of the Netherwood School
- Susan Shur-Fen Gau (born 1962), Taiwanese psychiatrist and academic
- Susan Gerbic (born 1963), American skeptical activist
- Susan George, several people
- Susan Glaspell (1876–1948), American playwright, novelist, journalist and actress
- Susan K. Gregurick, American computational chemist
- Susan Grey, several people
- Susan Tsui Grundmann, American attorney
- Susan Hampshire (born 1937), English actress
- Susan Ashbrook Harvey (born 1953), American professor of Byzantine and early Christian studies
- Susan Hayward (1917–1975), American actress
- Susan Helms (born 1958), American astronaut
- Susan Hendl (1947–2020), American ballet dancer and répétiteur
- Susan Heyward, American actress
- Susan Hill (born 1942), British author
- Susan Hiscock (1913–1995), British sailor
- Susan Ieraci (born 1960), Australian doctor and emergency specialist
- Susan Isaacs (born 1943), American author
- Susan Jaffe, American ballet dancer
- Susan Johnson, several people
- Susan Kadis (born 1953), Canadian politician
- Susan Keefe, American anthropologist and author
- Susan Kilrain (born 1961), American aerospace engineer, United States Navy officer and NASA astronaut
- Susan King, several people
- Susan G. Komen, American breast cancer victim at 36, whose sister named a foundation after her
- Susan Lalic (born 1965), English chess player
- Susan B. Landau (1952–2017), American film producer, television producer, talent manager, and photographer
- Susan Leithoff (born 1979), German politician
- Susan Lewis (writer) (born 1956), English author
- Susan Lindquist (1949–2016), American professor of biology at MIT
- Susan Littler (1947–1982), English actress
- Susan Lucci (born 1946), American actress
- Susan Nudelman (known as Suzi Ferrer) (1940–2006), US/Puerto-Rican visual artist and feminist
- Susan A. Martinis (born 1963), American biochemist
- Susan McFadden (born 1983), Irish actress and singer
- Susan Mikula, American artist and photographer
- Susan B. Millar, senior scientist at the Wisconsin Center for Education Research
- Susan Monica (born 1948), American former sailor and convicted murderer
- Susan Morton, New Zealand professor of epidemiology and population health
- Susan B. Neuman, American educator, researcher, and education policy-maker
- Susan Newell (1893–1923), last woman to be hanged in Scotland
- Susan O'Keeffe (born 1960), Irish journalist and former Labour Party politician
- Susan Oliver (1932–1990), American actress, director, and aviator
- Susan Orlean (born 1955), American journalist, television writer, and author
- Susan Oseloff (born 2006), German singer who represented Germany in the Junior Eurovision Song Contest 2020
- Susan J. Palmer (born 1946), Canadian sociologist
- Susan Polgar (born 1969), Hungarian-American grandmaster chess player
- Susie Porter (born 1970 or 1971), Australian television, film and theatre actress
- Susan Powell, several people
- Susan Powter (born 1957), Australian-born American motivational speaker and author
- Suzi Quatro (born 1950), American actress, singer-songwriter and musician
- Susan Quimpo (1961–2020), Filipina activist and writer
- Susan Reutzel-Edens, American chemist and Head of Science at the Cambridge Crystallographic Data Centre
- Susan Rice (born 1964), American diplomat, policy advisor, and public official
- Susan Rigetti (born 1991), American software engineer and author
- Susan Roces (1941–2022), Filipina actress
- Susan Roman (born 1957), Canadian voice actress
- Susan Douglas Rubeš (1925–2013), Austrian-born Canadian actress and producer
- Susan Ruskin, film producer
- Susan Saint James (born 1946), American actress
- Susan Augusta Pike Sanders (1842–1931), American teacher, clubwoman, and author
- Susan Sandretto, American professor of education
- Susan Sarandon (born 1946), American actress
- Susan Fromberg Schaeffer (1941–2011), American author
- Susan Polis Schutz (born 1944), American poet and greeting card writer
- Susan Seacrest (born 1953), American environmental activist and teacher
- Susan Shentall (1934–1996), British actress
- Susan Sheridan (1947–2015), British actress
- Susan Silver (born 1958), American music manager
- Siouxsie Sioux (born 1957), English musician
- Susan Sizemore (1951–2020), American novelist
- Susan Skarsgard (born 1954), American graphic designer and calligrapher
- Susan Slaughter, American orchestral trumpeter
- Susan Sloane (born 1970), retired American professional tennis player
- Susan Smith (born 1971), American murderer who drowned her two sons
- Susan Somers-Willett, American author
- Susan Sontag (1933–2004), American author, theorist, and political activist
- Susan Marr Spalding (1841–1908), American poet
- Susan Stamberg (1938–2025), American radio journalist
- Susan J. Swift Steele (1822–1895), American social reformer
- Susan Stewart, several people
- Susan Stokes-Chapman (born 1985), English author
- Susan Stryker (born 1961), American professor, historian, author, filmmaker, and theorist
- Susan Ann Sulley (born 1963), British singer with The Human League
- Susan Sullivan, several people
- Susan Swecker, American public affairs consultant
- Susan Tooby (born 1960), Welsh long-distance runner
- Susan Tucker, several people
- Susan Su (born 1984), Hong Kong model, banker and beauty pageant participant
- Susan Tully (born 1967), English television actress, producer and director
- Susan Twist, British actress
- Susan Wakhungu-Githuku (born 1960), Kenyan tennis player, writer, and business executive
- Susan Archer Weiss (1822–1917), American poet, author, artist
- Susan R. Wilson (1948–2020), Australian statistician
- Susan Tyler Witten (born 1970), American politician
- Susan H. Wixon (1839–1912), American freethought writer, editor, feminist, and educator
- Susan Wild (born 1957), American lawyer and former politician from Pennsylvania
- Susie Wiles (born 1957), American political consultant, incoming White House Chief of Staff
- Susan "Genie" Wiley (born 1957), American feral child
- Susan Williams, several people
- Susan Wojcicki (1968–2024), American business executive, third CEO of YouTube
- Susan Wood, several people

== Fictional characters ==
- Susan Ashwood, a blind medium from Manchester, UK, from the Power of Five series
- Susan Black, a character in Veronica Roth's Divergent
- Susan Bones, character in Harry Potter
- Susan Bunch, in the TV series Friends
- Susan Calvin, robopsychologist in the I, Robot series
- Susan Delgado, from The Dark Tower series
- Susan "Sue" Dibny, a character in DC Comics and the 2014 TV series The Flash
- Susan Foreman, a recurring character in Doctor Who
- Susan Heffley, in the book series Diary of a Wimpy Kid
- Susan Sto Helit, a Discworld character
- Susan Kennedy, a main character in the soap opera Neighbours
- Susan Lewis, doctor on the television show ER
- Susan Mayer, a main character in the TV series Desperate Housewives
- Susan Moore, character from 1978 to 1983 on the American soap opera General Hospital
- Susan Mortlake, from the Power of Five series
- Susan Murphy/Ginormica, a cartoon character voiced by Reese Witherspoon in the 2009 film Monsters vs. Aliens
- Susan Pevensie, a main character in The Chronicles of Narnia
- Susan Robinson, one of the original residents of 123 Sesame Street, played by Loretta Long
- Susan Ross (Seinfeld), NBC executive and the fiancé of George Costanza on the television show Seinfeld
- Susan Storm, a comic book superheroine in the Marvel Universe
- Susan Strong, in the television series Adventure Time
- Susan "Sue" Sylvester, a main character in the TV series Glee
- Susan Test, the younger twin sister of Mary Test, from the television series Johnny Test
- Susan Pervertski, a character in 2007 film Epic Movie
