= Keefe =

Keefe is both a surname and a masculine given name. Notable people with the name include:

Surname:

- Adam Keefe (basketball) (born 1970), American basketball player
- Adam Keefe (ice hockey) (born 1984), Canadian ice hockey player
- Anne Keefe (theatre director), American theatre director
- Bobby Keefe (1882–1964), American baseball player
- Brian Keefe, American basketball coach
- Daniel Keefe (1852–1929), American labor leader
- Dave Keefe (1897–1978), American baseball player
- David Keefe (born 1957), English footballer
- Denis Keefe (born 1958), British ambassador to Serbia
- Dylan Keefe (born 1970), American musician
- Emmett Keefe (1893–1965), American football player
- Frank Bateman Keefe (1887–1952), American politician
- George Keefe (1867–1935), American baseball player
- Jim Keefe (born 1965), American comic strip cartoonist
- John Keefe (baseball) (1867–1937), American baseball player
- John Keefe (actor) (born 1979), American actor
- John B. Keefe (1928–1997), American lawyer, judge, and politician
- Melinda H. Keefe, American chemist
- Michael Edwin Keefe (1844–1933), Canadian politician
- Mike Keefe (born 1946), American editorial cartoonist
- P. J. Keefe, American football coach
- Patrick Radden Keefe (born 1976), American writer and investigative journalist
- Peter Keefe (1952–2010), American television producer
- Rob Keefe (born 1980), American Arena Football League player and coach
- Sheldon Keefe (born 1980), Canadian ice hockey player
- Simon Keefe (born 1968), British musicologist and author
- Stephen Keefe (born 1945), American politician and chemist
- Susan Keefe, American anthropologist and author
- Tim Keefe (1857–1933), American baseball player
- William John Keefe (1873–1955), American judge
- Zena Keefe (1896–1977), American actress

Given name:

- Keefe Brasselle (1923–1981), American actor, television producer and writer
- Keefe Cato (born 1957), American baseball player

== Fictional characters ==
- Keefe Sencen, a character in the Keeper of the Lost Cities book series
- Keefe Lee, a character in The Butterfly Effect duology
- Keefe Chambers, a character in The Righteous Gemstones television series

== Places ==
- Keefe Peak, a mountain in Colorado

== See also ==
- O'Keefe
- O'Keeffe
