= Susan (disambiguation) =

Susan is a feminine given name.

Susan may also refer to:

== People ==
- List of people with given name Susan
- Susan (Iranian singer) (1942–2004), pop singer of the 1960s and 1970s
- Susan (Japanese singer), pop singer of the early 1980s
- Susan, Lady Renouf (1942–2016), Australian socialite
- Susan, Lady St Helier (1845–1931), London County Council alderman

== Places ==
- Susa, an ancient city in Iran
- Susan, Virginia, U.S.
- Susan District, an administrative subdivision of Iran
- Lake Susan, a lake in Minnesota, U.S.
- Port Susan, Washington, U.S.

== Other uses ==
- Susan (1813 ship), a British merchant and convict ship
- SUSAN corner detector
- Susan (dog) (1944–1959), a Pembroke Corgi dog owned by British Queen Elizabeth II
- Susan (film), a 2018 British film by Mahmoud Shoolizadeh
- "Susan" (song), a 1967 song by the Buckinghams
- Typhoon Susan, index of tropical cyclones of this name

== See also ==
- Black-eyed Susan (disambiguation)
- Lazy Susan
