= Jessie Jacobsen =

New Zealand academic neurogeneticist

- Citizenship: New Zealand
- Education: University of Auckland
- Known for: Research into Huntington's disease. Research into genetic diagnosis of autism spectrum disorder.
- Awards: Young Scientist of the Year 2007
- Scientific career
- Fields: Neurogenetics
- Doctoral advisor: Professor Russell Snell, head of the Molecular Genetics research group

Jessie Jacobsen is an associate professor in biological sciences at the University of Auckland. In 2007 she won MacDiarmid Young Scientist of the Year. Her research field is neurogenetics.

== Career ==
Jacobsen's research areas include the 'genetic basis of autism spectrum disorder'. She investigates neurodevelopmental disorders in the New Zealand population.

She graduated from the University of Auckland with a Bachelor of Science in Biomedical Science.

The following nine years she dedicated to research on Huntington's disease that started with a PhD at the University of Auckland and followed with receiving a substantial funding through fellowships. In 2007 she was awarded the MacDiarmid Young Scientist of the Year Award for Huntington’s disease research, and nominated for New Zealander of the Year. The following year she received the Philip Wrightson Fellowship (Neurological Foundation). Her university awarded her Young Alumna of the Year in 2010.

Jacobsen received a Neurological Foundation of New Zealand Postdoctoral Fellowship to study at Massachusetts General Hospital and Harvard Medical School, and worked in the Harvard’s Centre for Human Genetic Research laboratory of Professor Marcy MacDonald, developing her interest in complex genetic disorders leading to her research in 'autistic traits and their relationship to genetics'.

In 2012 a NZ$100,000 repatriation fellowship from the Neurological Foundation was granted to Jacobsen, followed by the Rutherford Discovery Fellowship (lead researcher) 'to establish a genetic research paradigm focused on uncovering underlying genetic causes of ASD in the New Zealand population' from 2013 to 2018.

Jacobsen is a founder of the Minds for Minds Autism Spectrum Disorder Research Network which is a New Zealand charitable trust. Researchers include Jacobsen, Professor Russell Snell who was also her PhD supervisor, Doctor Mike Taylor, Doctor Rosamund Hill, Associate Professor Klaus Lehnert, Doctor Javier Virues-Ortega, Professor Suzanne Purdy, Associate Professor Johanna Montgomery, Professor Karen Waldie, Professor Ian Kirk, and Liz Fairgray (Senior Tutor in Speech Science at the University of Auckland). In 2018 former government minister Steven Joyce became their patron.

== Selected bibliography ==
- Whitford, W., Lehnert, K., Snell, R. G., & Jacobsen, J. C. (2019). RBV: Read balance validator, a tool for prioritising copy number variations in germline conditions. Scientific reports, 9 (1)10.1038/s41598-019-53181-7
- Helbig, K. L., Lauerer, R. J., Bahr, J. C., Souza, I. A., Myers, C. T., Uysal, B., ... Keren, B. (2019). De Novo Pathogenic Variants in CACNA1E Cause Developmental and Epileptic Encephalopathy with Contractures, Macrocephaly, and Dyskinesias. American journal of human genetics, 104 (3)10.1016/j.ajhg.2019.02.015
- Robertson, S. P., Hindmarsh, J. H., Berry, S., Cameron, V. A., Cox, M. P., Dewes, O., ... Laurence, A. (2018). Genomic medicine must reduce, not compound, health inequities: the case for hauora-enhancing genomic resources for New Zealand. The New Zealand medical journal, 131 (1480), 81-89.
