= Jacquie Bay =

New Zealand interdisciplinary researcher and transdisciplinary practitioner

Jacqueline Lindsay Bay
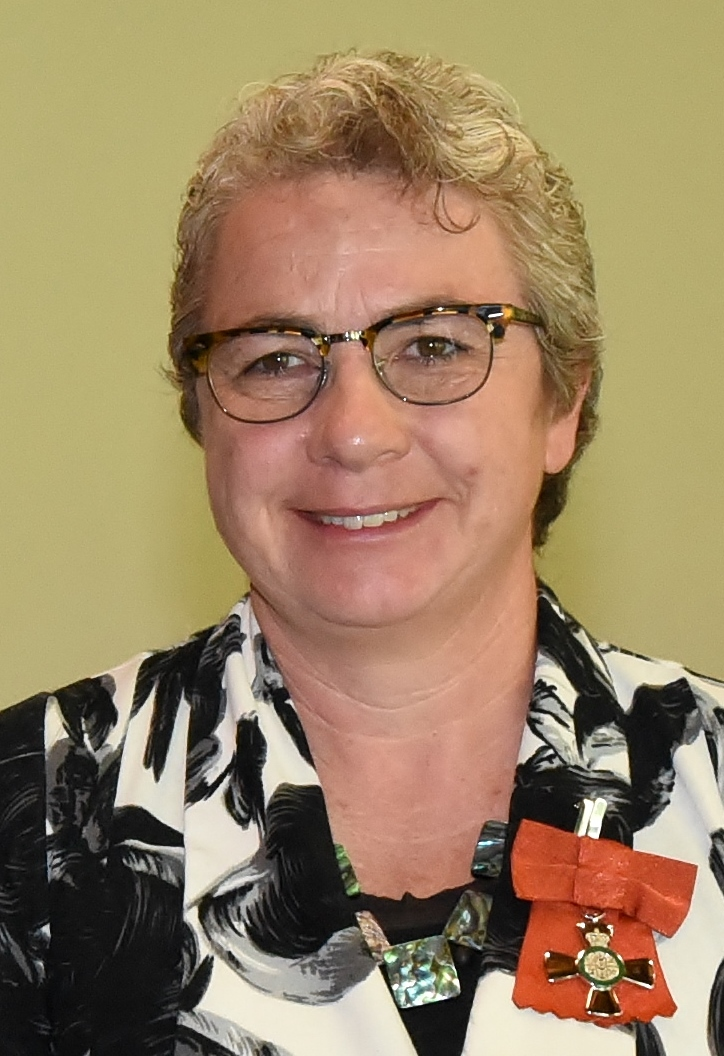
- Born: 20. century
- Awards: Member of the New Zealand Order of Merit

Academic background
- Education: University of Auckland, Auckland College of Education, University of Auckland, University of Auckland
- Thesis: Adolescent Participation in the DOHaD Story: Changing power relations through collaborative narrative to catalyse the potential of DOHaD for intergenerational change (2017)
- Doctoral advisor: Susan Morton, Mark Vickers, Michael A. Heymann

Jacqueline Lindsay Bay MNZM is a New Zealand academic crossing education, public health and science and society, based at the University of Auckland's Liggins Institute. In 2017 Bay was appointed a Member of the New Zealand Order of Merit for services to science and education.

== Academic career ==
Bay completed a PhD titled Adolescent Participation in the DOHaD Story: Changing power relations through collaborative narrative to catalyse the potential of DOHaD for intergenerational change at the University of Auckland. She also holds a Master of Education in science education from Auckland.

Bay is the Director of the science education programme LENScience, which stands for Liggins Education Network for Science. The programme investigates the effectiveness of measures to increase uptake of science from research. Part of LENScience was developed from research Bay conducted in the 1990s, and is aimed at intermediate and high school students, particularly in low decile schools and in Māori and Polynesian communities. LENScience includes programmes aimed at promoting science understanding in students, and professional development for science teachers.

Bay was previously Head of Science at the Diocesan School for Girls in Auckland, and has been president of the Biology Educators' Association of New Zealand.

Bay is part of the research team at Complex Conversations, a research programme based at the University of Auckland's Koi Tū: The Centre for Informed Futures, aimed at "innovating and improving citizen involvement in public decisions around complex issues". She facilitated a workshop in Kenya as part of the Anglican Communion Science Commission in 2023.

== Honours and awards ==
In the 2017 New Years Honours, Bay was appointed a Member of the New Zealand Order of Merit for services to science and education.

== Selected works ==
- Bay, Jacqueline Lindsay; H A Mora; Sloboda, Deborah Magdalena; Morton, Susan Mary; Vickers, Mark Hedley; P D Gluckman (2012). "Adolescent understanding of DOHaD concepts: a school-based intervention to support knowledge translation and behaviour change". Journal of Developmental Origins of Health and Disease. 3 (6): 469–482. doi:10.1017/s2040174412000505. PMID 25084300. Wikidata Q39511849.
- Bay, Jacqueline Lindsay; Vickers, Mark Hedley; Helen A Mora; Sloboda, Deborah Magdalena; Morton, Susan Mary (2017). "Adolescents as agents of healthful change through scientific literacy development: A school-university partnership program in New Zealand". International Journal of STEM Education. 4 (1): 15. doi:10.1186/s40594-017-0077-0. PMC 6310384. PMID 30631671. Wikidata Q59523027.
- Bev France; Bay, Jacqueline Lindsay (2009). "Questions Students Ask: Bridging the gap between scientists and students in a research institute classroom". International Journal of Science Education. 32 (2): 173–194. doi:10.1080/09500690903205189. Wikidata Q60502302.
- Bay, Jacqueline Lindsay; Rosemary Hipkins; Kamran Siddiqi; Rumana Huque; Dixon, Robyn; Debra Shirley; Karen Tairea; Delaney Yaqona; Amanda Mason-Jones; Vickers, Mark Hedley (2016). "School-based primary NCD risk reduction: education and public health perspectives". Health Promotion International. 32 (2): 369–379. doi:10.1093/heapro/daw096. PMID 28011654. Wikidata Q46914027.
- Bay, Jacqueline Lindsay; Morton, Susan Mary; Vickers, Mark Hedley (2016). "Realizing the Potential of Adolescence to Prevent Transgenerational Conditioning of Noncommunicable Disease Risk: Multi-Sectoral Design Frameworks". Healthcare. 4 (3). doi:10.3390/healthcare4030039. PMC 5041040. PMID 27417627. Wikidata Q26740257.
- Woods, Kathryn; H Leat; Bay, Jacqueline Lindsay; et al. (2018). "LifeLab Southampton: a programme to engage adolescents with DOHaD concepts as a tool for increasing health literacy in teenagers -a pilot cluster-randomized control trial". Journal of Developmental Origins of Health and Disease. 9 (5): 475–480. doi:10.1017/s2040174418000429. PMC 6159871. PMID 30101731. Wikidata Q57141620.
- Laura Fogg-Rogers; Bay, Jacqueline Lindsay; Hannah Burgess; Purdy, Suzanne Carolyn (2015). ""Knowledge Is Power" A Mixed-Methods Study Exploring Adult Audience Preferences for Engagement and Learning Formats Over 3 Years of a Health Science Festival". Science Communication. 37 (4): 419–451. doi:10.1177/1075547015585006. Wikidata Q60502292.
