= Anne Keefe =

Anne Keefe may refer to:

- Anne Keefe (theatre director)
- Anne Keefe (broadcaster)
- Ann Keefe, American activist and nun
