= Karen Waldie =

Canadian–New Zealand academic psychologist

Academic background
- Education: University of Calgary
- Theses: The positive relationship between self-esteem and cognitive task performance can it be modified? (1994); Hemispheric specialization for reading in subtypes of children with developmental dyslexia (1998)
- Doctoral advisor: J. Lary Mosley

Karen Elizabeth Waldie is a Canadian–New Zealand academic psychologist, and is a full professor at the University of Auckland, specialising in understanding the causes of neurodivergence such as autism, ADHD, dyslexia and dyscalculia.

== Early life and education ==
Waldie was born in Vancouver, and undertook her undergraduate education at the University of Victoria under the honors supervision of the late Emeritus Professor Otfried Spreen. She then completed an MSc, followed by a PhD titled Hemispheric specialization for reading in subtypes of children with developmental dyslexia, both at the University of Calgary. Her doctoral work was supervised by Lary Mosley.

== Academic career ==
Waldie and her New Zealand husband psychologist Professor Ian Kirk moved back to New Zealand, and Waldie joined the Dunedin Multidisciplinary Health and Development Study at the University of Otago as a research fellow. She joined the faculty of the University of Auckland in 2001, and was appointed to full professor in 2020.

Waldie's research focuses on understanding the causes of neurodivergence, covering conditions such as ADHD, autism, dyslexia and dyscalculia. She uses techniques such functional magnetic resonance imaging to see differences between activity in neurodivergent brains and ordinary brains. Her research on structural brain differences in neurodivergent children led to the Ministry of Education recognising dyslexia as a disability in 2007. As a named investigator on the Growing Up in New Zealand team, Waldie led research analysing paracetamol use by pregnant women, finding a link to childhood depression. She was a principal investigator on a 2019 Marsden grant to investigate links between environment and childhood mental health. Waldie was also an associate investigator in a 2022 funded Marsden grant titled Revealing Dynamic ADHD Brain Behaviour using Hyperband MRI.

Waldie contributed to The Chronicle of Cognition, a collaborative work 'tracing histories of human and non-human cognition through live events, online contributions and a large-scale wall work.'

In 2019 Waldie was a NEXT Woman of the Year finalist, with the award finally being won by Diana Sarfati.

== Selected works ==
- Nixon, Gillian M.; Thompson, John Michael David; Dug Yeo Han; Becroft, David Maxwell O'Neill; Clark, Phillipa M.; Robinson, Elizabeth; Waldie, Karen; Wild, Christopher John; Black, Peter Nigel; Mitchell, Edwin Arthur (2008). "Short sleep duration in middle childhood: risk factors and consequences". Sleep. 31 (1): 71–78. PMC 2225560. PMID 18220080. Wikidata Q36427068.
- Underwood, Lisa; Waldie, Karen; D'Souza, Stephanie; Peterson, Elizabeth Ruth; Morton, Susan Mary (2016). "A review of longitudinal studies on antenatal and postnatal depression" (PDF). Archives of Women's Mental Health. 19 (5): 711–720. doi:10.1007/s00737-016-0629-1. PMID 27085795. Wikidata Q38810040.
- Morton, Susan Mary; Atatoa, Polly Elizabeth; Grant, Cameron Charles; et al. (2012). "Cohort profile: growing up in New Zealand". International Journal of Epidemiology. 42 (1): 65–75. doi:10.1093/ije/dyr206. PMID 22253317. Wikidata Q45882316.
- Thompson, John Michael David; Waldie, Karen; Wall, Clare; Rinky Murphy; Mitchell, Edwin Arthur (2014). "Associations between acetaminophen use during pregnancy and ADHD symptoms measured at ages 7 and 11 years". PLOS One. 9 (9) e108210. Bibcode:2014PLoSO...9j8210T. doi:10.1371/journal.pone.0108210. PMC 4177119. PMID 25251831. Wikidata Q28543188.
- Anna J. Wilson; Stuart G. Andrewes; Helena Struthers; Victoria M. Rowe; Rajna Bogdanovic; Waldie, Karen (2015). "Dyscalculia and dyslexia in adults: Cognitive bases of comorbidity". Learning and Individual Differences. 37: 118–132. doi:10.1016/j.lindif.2014.11.017. Wikidata Q60589117.
- Slykerman, Rebecca F.; Thompson, John Michael David; Waldie, Karen; Rinki Murphy; Wall, Clare; Mitchell, Edwin Arthur (2016). "Antibiotics in the first year of life and subsequent neurocognitive outcomes". Acta Paediatrica. 106 (1): 87–94. doi:10.1111/apa.13613. PMID 27701771. Wikidata Q39324163.
- Blair, Nikki J.; Thompson, John Michael David; Black, Peter Nigel; Becroft, David Maxwell O'Neill; Clark, Phillipa M.; Dug Yeo Han; Robinson, Elizabeth; Waldie, Karen; Wild, Christopher John; Mitchell, Edwin Arthur (2007). "Risk factors for obesity in 7-year-old European children: the Auckland Birthweight Collaborative Study". Archives of Disease in Childhood. 92 (10): 866–871. doi:10.1136/adc.2007.116855. PMC 2083229. PMID 17855436. Wikidata Q36154081.
