= Global SchoolNet =

Nonprofit educational organization

Global SchoolNet: Linking Kids Around the World Logo

Global SchoolNet (GSN) is a nonprofit 501(c)(3) international educational organization that serves as a clearinghouse for collaborative educational projects, many that are based on the Constructivist Learning model. The organization coordinates projects and competitions focused on humanitarian issues, diplomacy, leadership, innovative teaching, entrepreneurship, STEM, and other academics for schools and youth organizations internationally. About 150,000 educators from 194 countries have registered as members of Global SchoolNet, and about 5.5 million students from 109 countries have participated in GSN projects as of 2020. Global SchoolNet is known for two international competitions, the International CyberFair for students in grades kindergarten through high school, and the U.S. State Department-sponsored Doors to Diplomacy for ages 12 through 19. Global SchoolNet was established in 1984 as Free Educational Mail (FrEdMail) in San Diego, California, where its headquarters still exists.

== History ==
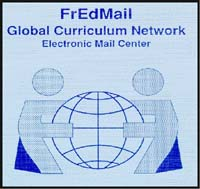
FrEdMail: Global Curriculum Network Electronic Mail Center Original Logo

Global SchoolNet was founded by San Diego County teachers Yvonne Marie Andrés and Al Rogers. Andrés reported the seed for the program was planted in 1983 when she received an Apple IIe computer while teaching at Pacific Elementary School in the Oceanside Unified School District in San Diego county. The computer was one of 10,000 that Apple had donated to California public schools for the program "Kids Can't Wait". Andrés first used the computer in a keypal project with San Diego students and students in England, but soon realized there needed to be a stronger e-learning component.

In 1983, Andrés began working with Rogers on expanding the idea of connecting schools using e-learning projects. Rogers at the time was a computer specialist for the San Diego Office of Education and was interested in software that could help improve students' writing. That year, Rogers created the software program Free Educational Writer, or FrEdWriter, which prompted students through different writing exercises. To provide a way for students using the FrEdWriter program to write to students in other schools Rogers developed Free Educational Mail, or FrEdMail, in 1985. The FrEdMail Network became the nonprofit FrEdMail Foundation in 1989. More than 150 schools and school districts were using it for free international email access and curriculum services by then.

In 1991 thousands of FrEdMail users gained access to the NSFNET via newly established gateways at two NSFNET mid-level network locations: Merit/MichNet in Ann Arbor, Michigan, and CERFnet (California Education and Research Federation Network) in San Diego, California. FrEdMail subscribers began to exchange project-based learning electronic mail with the entire Internet community. The FrEdMail-NSFNET Gateway Software was available free of cost to any mid-level network, college, or university which had an interest in collaborating with local K-12 school districts to bring electronic networking to teachers and students. Through FrEdMail, educators were able share classroom experiences, distribute curriculum ideas and teaching materials, as well as obtain information about workshops, job opportunities, and legislation affecting education. At its peak, FrEdMail was used by 12,000 schools and 350 nodes worldwide.

When the World Wide Web became available to the public in 1993, the FrEdMail Foundation became the Global SchoolNet Foundation and launched its first website, GlobalSchoolhouse.org. The following year the National Science Foundation also awarded Global SchoolNet a grant to introduce a desktop video-conferencing program called CU-SeeMe. CU-SeeMe was used for many educational video-conferences and in 1995 by World News Now for the first television broadcast live on the Internet, which featured an interview by World News Now anchor Kevin Newman and Andrés.

== Awards and honors ==
- Teaching and Learning Magazine, October 2005, recognized FrEdMail as number 12 in a list of the top 25 "breakthrough products" of the previous 25 years.
- Readers Choice: Top 50 Ed-Tech Products, eSchool Media, January 2012, Recognizing products and services that are making a difference in schools.

== Projects Registry ==
Launched in 1995, the Projects Registry contains more than 3,000 annotated listings, making it the oldest and largest online clearinghouse for teacher-conducted international e-learning projects. The Projects Registry is searchable by date, student age, location, curriculum, technology, and collaboration type. Educators worldwide can register to collaborate with partners on project-based learning a wide range of activities. Educators submit ideas for collaborative learning projects to the Projects Registry, which sends out a "Call for Collaboration" announcement. The number of classes or groups participating in any project varies. In one example of how classrooms collaborate on projects called Thinking Like Santa, elementary students write letters to Santa that are answered by older students at other schools. The Thinking Like Santa writing project dates back to 1981 and predates Free Educational Mail (FrEdMail), the predecessor to Global SchoolNet.

== International CyberFair ==
Global SchoolNet received funding from Cisco Systems, MCI and Network Solutions in 1996 for an educational project for students to create content about their local community. International Schools CyberFair is an authentic learning program used by schools and youth organizations around the world.

The project is based on the concept of the World's Fair and asks students to create virtual exhibits that highlight their local community's history, leaders, environment, culture or attractions. The underlying theme of CyberFair is to "Share and Unite." Youth conduct original research and publish their findings on the Web. Recognition is given to the best projects in each of eight categories. This White House-endorsed program encourages youth to become community ambassadors by working collaboratively and using technology to share what they have learned. Students participate in a unique peer review process to evaluate other projects by using an online evaluation rubric. International CyberFair was endorsed by Vice President Al Gore in 1996, and subsequently by other notable business and political leaders, including Internet architect Vint Cerf. More than 15,000 CyberFair projects have been produced by schools representing 109 countries. Affiliate CyberFair programs exist in several countries and include the Taiwan CyberFair and the Philippines CyberFair, which was started by Janette Toral, an internet marketing consultant expert, trainer, blogger, policy lobbyist and entrepreneur.

== Doors to Diplomacy Challenge ==
In 2002 the U.S. Department of State approached Global SchoolNet to redesign the International CyberFair with a global perspective. According to the State Department's announcement for the 2012 contest, the goal of Doors to Diplomacy is to recognize student-created Global SchoolNet projects from around the world that best teach about the importance of international affairs and diplomacy. The competition is open to youth ages 12–19 in middle or high school. Projects must focus on one of eight subcategories: leadership traits; peace and democracy; business, trade, and economics; science and technology; safety and security; history of foreign relations; health and environmental awareness; and arts and culture. More than 1,500 projects are archived in the Doors to Diplomacy library and serve as educational resources.

== Online expeditions ==
Global SchoolNet partners with explorers who want to share the educational value of their travels with youth. Previous online expeditions have included Dan Buettner's bicycle journey through the Mayan ruins, Wave Vidmar's solo and unsupported trek to the North Pole, Sandra Hill Pitman's climb up Mt. Everest and Roger William's "Where on the Globe is Roger?" peace journey across six continents.

Global SchoolNet provides the curriculum and students participate by following field reports and interacting with the explorers along their route.

== US-Russia Social Expertise Exchange (SEE) ==
Global SchoolNet serves an organizer for the US-Russia Social Expertise Exchange (SEE) Education and Youth working group. The US-Russia Social Expertise Exchange promotes collaboration between Russian and US non-governmental organizations, leading to meaningful improvement in the lives of the citizens of both countries. SEE is an expansion of the US-Russia Civil Society Partnership Program (CSPP), which was launched in May 2011. CSPP had grown out of two US-Russia Civil Society Summits held in 2009 and 2010 after Russian and US civil society experts recognized the need for greater collaboration between citizens of both countries. In 2013, the program's name was changed from CSPP to SEE to reflect the expansion of its network of participants and their activities. SEE consists of 11 working groups offering Russian and US NGOs a platform for collaboration across a broad array of thematic topics.

In August 2013 the San Diego International Children’s Film Festival featured the premiere of short documentary about youth promoting community service and volunteerism in San Diego and in Russia. The film CyberFair: Connecting Youth Through Volunteerism, highlights the inspirational efforts of youth who volunteer at local organizations such as the Rancho Coastal Humane Society, the Oceanside Bread of Life, and the La Vida del Mar Senior Home. The eight-minute film can be viewed on YouTube.

In August 2014 the SEE Education and Youth group published a report, "School and the Community: Collaboration in the Context of New Educational Standards: Experiences of Russia and the United States," written by Russian and American education leaders, revealing successful models for collaboration among schools, nonprofit organizations, and businesses in the context of the new educational standards in Russia and the United States. The publication is addressed to school administrators, education thought leaders, community organizations, and community-oriented businesses.

== Global Forest Link ==
Launched in 2015, Global Forest Link is a S.T.E.A.M. (Science, Technology, Engineering, Arts, Math) education program that engages high school and middle school students in the collaborative analysis of local forest health and helps them explore the impact of environmental change factors. Students share results online via photographs and digital stories with peers in other cities and countries, giving them a local and global perspective. The program has connected more than 1,500 students from the United States, Russia, Taiwan, Ecuador, and Nigeria with Global Forest Watch, a 20-year-old worldwide network that uses satellite imagery and other scientific methods to monitor tree-covered areas of the world.

== OUR PRIDE Education and Film Competition ==
OUR PRIDE Education and Film Competition is a juried short film competition for young filmmakers to create original, relevant, and accurate stories to document LGBTQ people, places, and events that expand understanding and awareness of LGBTQ contributions to society. There are two divisions: Middle and High School Youth (ages 12–18) and College Students. Filmmakers receive cash awards and their films are screened at the Children's International Film Festival at Comic-Con. The competition was introduced to support the FAIR Education Act, which requires that California K-12 schools provide Fair, Accurate, Inclusive and Respectful representations of people with disabilities and people who are lesbian, gay, bisexual or transgender in history and social studies curriculum. Paper Bag Heart, the 2017 winning film produced by Sage Creek High School students, depicts a small 1974 march where participants wore bags over their heads to conceal their identities and can be viewed on YouTube.

== Literature ==
- Michael Sattler, Greg Horman: Internet TV with CU-SeeMe, Indiana: Sams.net Publishing, 1995.
- Brendan P. Kehoe: Zen and the Art of the Internet: A Beginner's Guide, Prentice Hall Series in Innovative Technology, 1995.
- Carl Malamud, foreword by His Holiness The Dalai Lama: A World's Fair for the Global Village, MIT Press, 1997, page 229.
- Frances Karnes Ph.D., Tracy Riley Ph.D.: Competitions for Talented Kids, Texas: Prufrock Press, 2005, page 83.
- Riichiro Mizoguchi, Pierre Dillenbourg, Zhiting Zhu: Learning by Effective Utilization of Technologies: Facilitating Intercultural Understanding , Netherlands: IOS Press, 2006, page 243.
- Sara Armstrong: Information Literacy: Navigating and Evaluating Today's Media, Shell Education, 2008, page 199.
- Scott Monroe Waring: Preserving History: The Construction of History in the K-16 Classroom, Information Age Publishing, 2011, page 49.
- David N. Aspin, Judith Chapman, Karen Evans: Second International Handbook of Lifelong Learning, Springer Publishing, 2012, page 682.

== See also ==
- CyberFair Project, Carpinteria, California
- CyberFair Project, Ming Dao High School, Taiwan
- Global Schoolhouse Uses CU-SeeMe
