= Yvonne Andres =

American educator

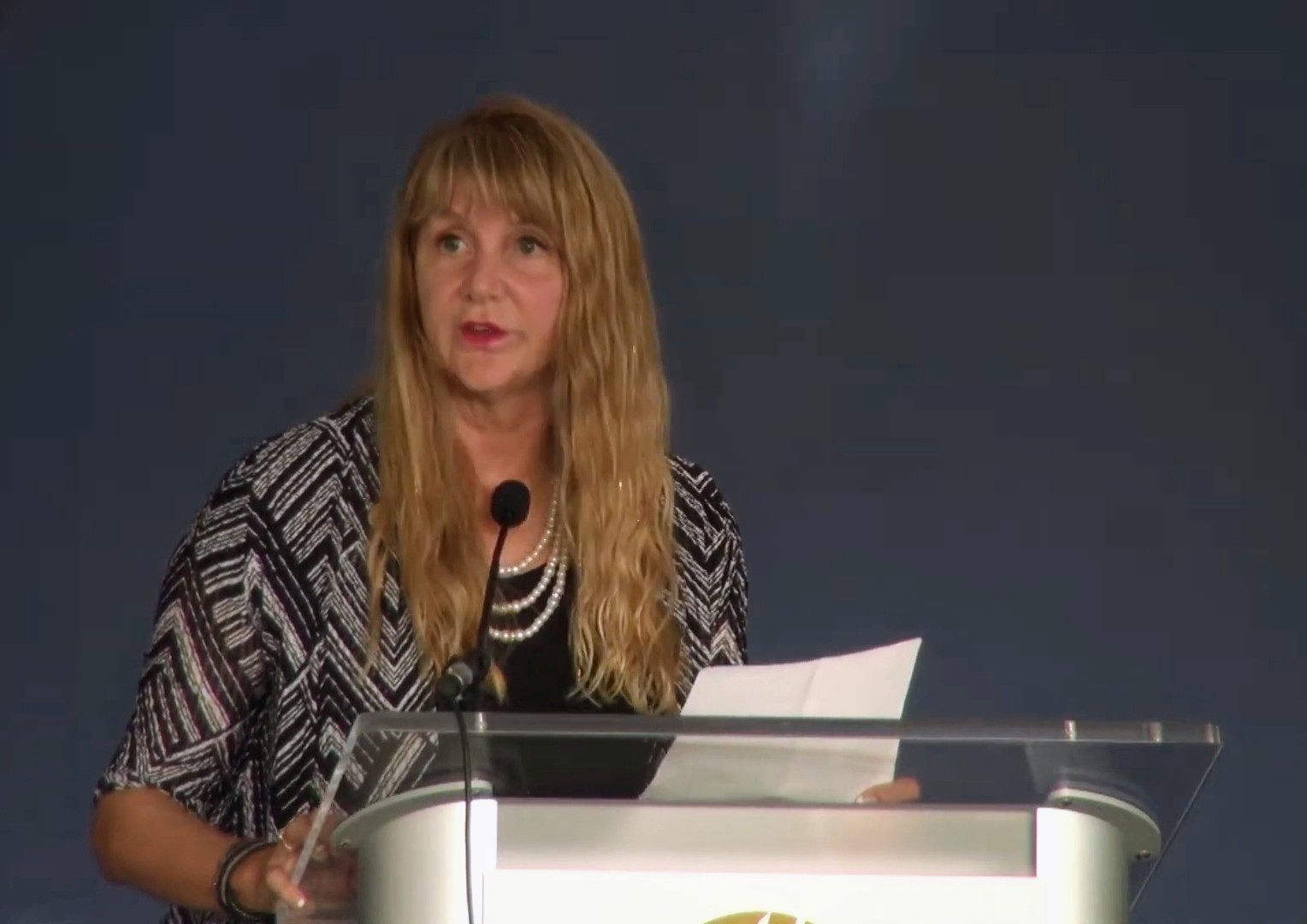
Yvonne Andres, 2017

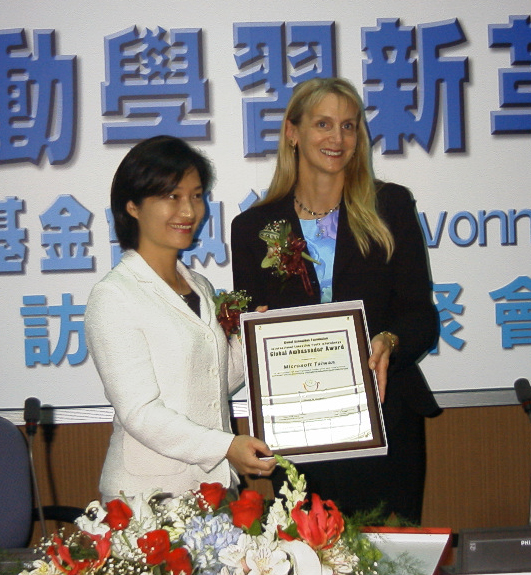
Dr. Yvonne Marie Andrés is presented the Global Ambassador Award by Microsoft in Taiwan (2006)

Dr. Yvonne Marie Andrés is an American educator who is recognized as an e-learning pioneer and visionary. Andrés is the co-founder of the non-profit Global SchoolNet (1984) and the founder of the Global Schoolhouse (1992). Andrés was named one of the 25 most influential people worldwide in education technology and was invited to meet with President Bush to launch the Friendship Through Education initiative (2000). Andrés is the creator and producer of International CyberFair and the US State Department’s Doors to Diplomacy program. Andrés frequently writes about highly effective education programs from around the globe that blend online and offline learning, while incorporating the latest neuroplasticity findings and Constructivist Learning methodology. Andrés has provided leadership throughout the US, Canada, Asia, Europe, Australia, South America and Africa and in 2007 Andrés was awarded the Soroptimist International Making a Difference Award for advancing the status of women and children. Andrés was selected as one of San Diego Magazine's Women Who Move the City, recognizing dynamic women who create positive change and contribute to the community. In 2021 Andrés was recognized as One of the Most Influential Women in Technology by San Diego Business Journal.

== Career ==
Andres is the founding President and CEO of (non-profit) Global SchoolNet, iPoPP: international Projects or Partners Place, and founder of the Global Schoolhouse.

Andrés began her career as a Title I teacher, school-based program coordinator, and technology mentor for the Oceanside Unified School District in Oceanside, California. Andrés has been a champion of online learning since 1984 as a project director for various networks, including AT&T Learning Network, CORE (California Online Resources in Education) Network, CERFnet (California Education Research Federation) and Free Educational Mail (FrEdMail).

Global Schoolhouse students communicating via CU-SeeMe

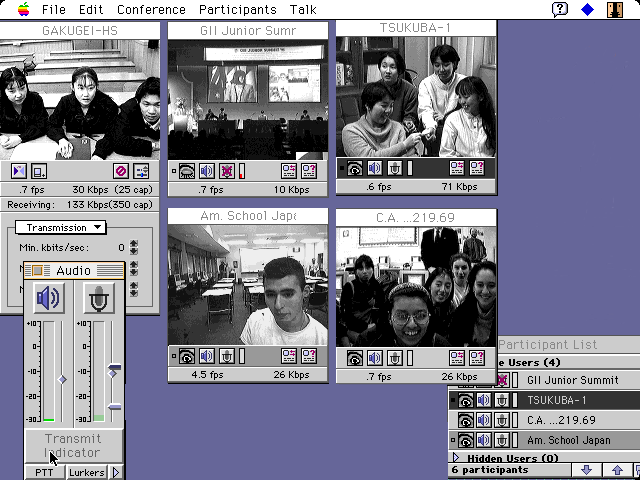
Screen capture showing Global Schoolhouse classrooms collaborating via CU-SeeMe

Andrés co-authored "TeleSensations: The Educators' Handbook to Instructional TeleComputing" (1988) and served as editor of an international newsletter focusing on collaborative telecomputing. Andrés developed and coordinated the original Global Schoolhouse Project (1992) for NSF, digitally bringing together youth from Tennessee, Virginia, California, and England to conduct an environmental watershed pollution study and share findings via state-of-the-art CU-SeeMe video conferencing using desktop computers and the Internet. CU-SeeMe was used by World News Now for the first television broadcast live over the Internet on Thanksgiving morning in 1995. WNN anchor Kevin Newman and Global Schoolhouse founder Yvonne Marie Andrés discussed the future of computers in communication.

Andrés wrote "CERF'n Safari: Educators' Guide to the Internet," the first teacher's Internet guide. In 1994 Andrés accepted an appointment to the Governor's Information Technology Council for California, where she co-authored "Getting Results." Andrés co-authored Cisco System's "Going to School on the Internet" and "Harnessing the Power of the Web for Classroom Use." Andrés wrote Apple's "Getting Started on the Internet." She was the executive producer of Dr. Jane Goodall’s first web site and Microsoft’s first education website.

(1999–2001) As Vice President of Programs and Partnerships for Lightspan (acquired by Plato Learning), Andrés was responsible for e-learning product development, online community development, event-driven usage, project management, brand development, and web site traffic growth.

Andrés served (2009–2016) as the co-chair of the Youth and Education Working Group of the US-Russia Social Expertise Exchange (SEE). The program was implemented by Eurasia Foundation (USA) in partnership with the New Eurasia Foundation (Russia). The Education and Youth Working Group members encourage cross-cultural understanding among US and Russian youth; preparing young people of both countries to work collaboratively to solve or prevent global problems via student-centered methods such as education exchanges, seminars, and conferences. They foster a collaborative process among youth and education practitioners and share best practices among Russian/US education and youth-focused organizations by creating new partnerships and identifying innovative technology tools.

In 2014 Andrés co-authored "CyberFair: Opening the Doors to Collaboration" and "School and the Community: Collaboration in the Context of New Educational Standards: Experiences of Russia and the United States." These two publications reveal successful models for collaboration among schools, nonprofit organizations, and businesses—in the context of the new educational standards in Russia and the United States.

Andrés serves (2014-current) as the Education and Outreach Director for Global Forest Link. Global Forest Link, a program developed by San Diego based nonprofits Community Commons and Global_SchoolNet, creates opportunities for high school and middle school students to contribute valuable information to Global Forest Watch, a 20-year-old worldwide network that uses satellite imagery and other scientific methods to monitor the health of tree-covered areas around the world. Students in the program learn environmental science and data analysis, while improving their communication, storytelling, and video production skills, and expanding their world perspective by collaborating with peers in other nations. Self-paced tutorials and downloadable resources are available in multiple languages.

Andrés serves as (2016-current) as the Education and Outreach Director for OUR PRIDE Education program, an LGBTQ+ youth-centered program of Los Angeles–based 501(c)3 LGBTQ+ Civil Rights, Social Action and Advocacy nonprofit Rainbow Advocacy in collaboration with San Diego–based 501(c)3 educational nonprofit Global_SchoolNet Foundation, created to cultivate compassion through LGBTQ+ social action, education and the arts. OUR PRIDE supports intergenerational programs for youth and young adults which address mental health, community issues, human rights, history and culture. OUR PRIDE Education assists schools and youth organizations in fulfilling requirements to support inclusive education mandates, including California’s FAIR (Fair, Accurate, Inclusive, Respectful) Education Act, which requires public schools to integrate factual information about social movements, current events, and history of LGBTQ+ people into social science instruction.

== Awards and honors ==
- EdNet Hero Award, The Heller Reports, September 1995, Making a significant impact on education through technology.
- Top 30 Most Influential People in Education Technology, eSchool News, November 1999, Recognizing individuals who have improved education through the use of technology.
- Top 25 Technology Advocates, District Administration Magazine, December 2001, Recognizing innovators who improve how students learn.
- Global Ambassador Award, National Tsing Hua University, June 2002, In recognition of distinguished leadership and achievement for promoting international education in the Republic of China Taiwan.
- EdNet Hero Award, The Heller Reports, October 2003, Making a significant impact on education through technology.
- Advancing the Status of Women & Children Award, Soroptimist International, June 2007, Improving humanity by advancing the status of women and children.
- Readers Choice: Top 50 Ed-Tech Products, eSchool Media, January 2012, Recognizing products and services that are making a difference in schools.
- Women Who Move the City, San Diego Business Journal, August 2012, San Diego Magazine's Women Who Move the City award recognizes dynamic women who create positive change and contribute to the community.
- Women Who Mean Business Awards, San Diego Magazine, November 2012, recognizing dynamic women business leaders and role models, selected for their achievements and contributions to San Diego companies.
- Best Forest Education Program, San Diego Urban Forest Council, December 2016, recognizes most effective forest education program for youth.
- ELearning Champion, ELearning Magazine, March 2017, honors professionals across six categories for exceptional contributions to the learning industry.
- Internet Hall of Fame inductee, 2017
- 11 Women Who Revolutionized the Internet, Popular Mechanics, October 2019
- Most Influential Women in Technology, San Diego Business Journal, April 2021, Celebrating San Diego's most influential women in technology.

== Literature ==
- CyberFair Implementation Guide: Opening the Doors to Collaboration, English 2014.
- CyberFair Implementation Guide: Opening the Doors to Collaboration, Russian 2014.
- School and the Community: Collaboration in the Context of New Educational Standards: Experiences of Russia and the United States, English 2014.
- School and the Community: Collaboration in the Context of New Educational Standards: Experiences of Russia and the United States, Russian 2014.
- Going to School on the Internet 1996.
- CERF'n Safari: Educators' Guide to the Internet 1993.
- TeleSensations: Educators Handbook Instructional Telecomputing 1988.
