= Seth O'Byrne =

California real estate broker

Seth O'Byrne is a California real estate broker in San Diego, California with Compass who stars on HGTV's television series Hot Properties San Diego.

== Early life ==
O'Byrne attended the University of San Diego.

== Career ==
=== Real estate ===
Seth O'Byrne began selling homes in 2002 while he was a third year at the University of San Diego. He was a finalist for "40 Under 40" by the San Diego Business Journal, Realtor of the Year in 2017, and "50 Most Influential Business Leaders in San Diego."

=== Television ===
O'Byrne stars on HGTV's Hot Properties San Diego along with co-stars Mia Tidwell and Andrew White. HGTV aired a total of 9 episodes.

In addition to HGTV, O'Byrne has also appeared on FOX, CBS, Amazon, and Apple TV.
