= Alison Kearney =

New Zealand professor of education

Academic background
- Education: Massey University
- Theses: The computer as an agent of inclusion: a study of current practice (1999); Barriers to school inclusion : an investigation into the exclusion of disabled students from and within New Zealand schools (2009)
- Doctoral advisor: Jill Bevan-Brown, Roseanna Bourke, Ruth Kane
- Other advisors: Mark E. Brown, Ken Ryba

Alison Kearney is a New Zealand education academic and teacher, and is a full professor at Massey University, specialising in educational equity and inclusion.

== Early life and education ==
Kearney was born and grew up in Gisborne. Her brother was born with intellectual disabilities, and was institutionalised, sparking Kearney's interest in how and why students are marginalised and excluded from education. Kearney worked as a primary school teacher for fifteen years, and then as a special education teacher.

== Academic career ==
Kearney completed a Master of Education in special education with a thesis on the practice of using computers to increase educational inclusion, and a PhD titled Barriers to school inclusion: an investigation into the exclusion of disabled students from and within New Zealand schools, both at Massey University. Kearney then joined the faculty of Massey, rising to full professor in 2023. As of 2024 she is Head of the Institute of Education at Massey. Previously she was the Head of the School of Curriculum and Pedagogy in the College of Education. She was also founding co-director of the Equity through Education Centre. Kearney is an editor of Kairaranga, an interprofessional journal about equity in education.

Kearney's research focuses on inclusion and educational equity. Kearney is chairperson of the New Zealand Council of Deans of Education. In this capacity Kearney responded to the Minister of Education Erica Stanford's criticisms of initial teacher education as "woeful" by asking for a 'please explain' meeting, saying that the government's suggested approach to reading education was "the antithesis of achieving equity".

== Selected works ==
- Kearney, Alison; Kane, Ruth G. (2006). "Inclusive education policy in New Zealand: reality or ruse?". International Journal of Inclusive Education. 10 (2–3): 201–219. doi:10.1080/13603110500256145. Wikidata Q125164056.
- John O'Neill; Bourke, Roseanna; Kearney, Alison (2009). "Discourses of inclusion in initial teacher education: Unravelling a New Zealand 'number eight wire' knot". Teaching and Teacher Education. 25 (4): 588–593. doi:10.1016/j.tate.2009.02.002. Wikidata Q108906772.
- Mandia Mentis; Wendy Holley-Boen; Philippa Butler; Kearney, Alison; Julia Budd; Riley, Tracy; MacArthur, Jude; Vijaya Dharan; Jill Bevan-Brown (2016). "Māwhai: Webbing a professional identity through networked interprofessional communities of practice". Teaching and Teacher Education. 60: 66–75. doi:10.1016/j.tate.2016.08.008. Wikidata Q125164054.
- Carrington, Suzanne, MacArthur, Jude, Kearney, Alison, Kimber, Megan, Mercer, Louise, Morton, Missy, & Rutherford, Gill (2012) Towards an inclusive education for all. In MacArthur, J & Carrington, S (Eds.) Teaching in Inclusive School Communities. John Wiley & Sons, Australia, pp. 3–38.
- Tracy L Riley, J Bevan-Brown, B Bicknell, J Carroll-Lind, A Kearney. (2004) The extent, nature and effectiveness of planned approaches in New Zealand schools for providing for gifted and talented students: Report to the Ministry of Education
- Kearney, Alison. Exclusion from and Within School: Issues and Solutions.
- Janis Carroll-Lind; Kearney, Alison (2004). "Bullying: What do Students say?". Kairaranga. 5 (2): 19–24. doi:10.54322/kairaranga.v5i2.2. Wikidata Q125777833.
- NZARE (2 May 2018). "School stand-downs and the UN Convention on the Rights of the Child: Examining the issues". Ipu Kererū.
