= BigRentz =

- Founded: March 2012
- Founders: Dallas Imbimbo; Stephen Jesson; Nick Kovacevich
- Headquarters: California, United States
- Area served: United States
- Key people: Scott Cannon (CEO)
- Products: Construction and Industrial Equipment Rentals
- Website: www.bigrentz.com

BigRentz is an equipment rental company based in California, United States. The company operates as an online marketplace for heavy equipment rentals.

== History ==
BigRentz was co-founded in March 2012 by Dallas Imbimbo, Stephen Jesson and Nick Kovacevich. Initially, they purchased domain names such as forkliftrental.com, scissorliftrental.com, and discountliftrental.com, and started to fulfill equipment rental orders using local equipment rental companies in order to validate their idea of online heavy equipment rentals.

After getting national level rentals contracts, they merged their websites into one comprehensive site, BigRentz. They hired company's first engineer in 2014 and started working on scaling the business.

In 2017, Dallas Imbimbo stepped down as CEO of BigRentz after serving for five years and Scott Cannon was named as new CEO.

In 2019, BigRentz claimed to have 2,500 rental partners and more than 8,500 rental locations across the United States.

In 2020, BigRentz merged with Lizzy Lift, and acquired Equipment Management Group which made it the largest construction equipment rental network in the United States. The same year, BigRentz raised investment of $15 million from Itochu.

== Recognition ==
In 2016, BigRentz was ranked at no. 48 on Inc.'s 5000 list of fastest-growing company for achieving 5,093% growth and for growing from 2 to 95 employees between 2012 and 2015.

BigRentz was selected multiple times by the Orange County Business Journal as one of the fastest growing companies.
