= Susan Sandretto =

New Zealand American professor of education

Academic background
- Education: University of California, Davis, University of Sacramento, University of Otago
- Thesis: Teacher education and social justice: theorising professional practice (2004)

Susan Elaine Sandretto is an American–New Zealand academic, and is a full professor at the University of Otago, specialising in working with teachers to develop critical literacy in primary and secondary school pupils. Sandretto also works on unintended consequences of educational policy, such as changes to active transport.

== Academic career ==
Sandretto trained as a teacher, and worked as a Spanish immersion teacher in California primary schools before moving to New Zealand in 1997. She lectured in education at the University of Otago, and completed a PhD titled Teacher education and social justice: theorising professional practice at Otago in 2004. Sandretto then joined the faculty of the university, rising to associate professor in 2019 and full professor in 2024.

Sandretto's research and teaching focus on the development of critical literacy, which is the ability to find embedded discrimination in media, although she is also interested in multiliteracies and gender issues in education. She teaches in primary teacher education, and education studies. Sandretto is part of the writing team for the English Learning Area of the New Zealand refreshed curriculum, Te Mātaiaho, and has produced materials to support literacy development in the classroom. Sandretto has also focused on how educational policy can have unintended effects, such as changes in rates of active transport. Sandretto is a member of the Built Environment Active Transport to School research group, a Health Research Council-funded project led by Sandra Mandic at Otago and Auckland University of Technology.

In 2008 Sandretto won Otago University Students' Association's New Supervisor of the Year award.

== Selected works ==
- Kane, Ruth G.; Sandretto, Susan Elaine; Chris Heath (2002). "Telling Half the Story: A Critical Review of Research on the Teaching Beliefs and Practices of University Academics". Review of Educational Research. 72 (2): 177–228. doi:10.3102/00346543072002177. Wikidata Q126788876.
- Kane, Ruth G.; Sandretto, Susan Elaine; Chris Heath (2004). "An investigation into excellent tertiary teaching: Emphasising reflective practice". Higher Education. 47 (3): 283–310. doi:10.1023/b:high.0000016442.55338.24. Wikidata Q125619121.
- Trish Wells; Sandretto, Susan Elaine (2016). ""I'm on a journey I never thought I'd be on": using process drama pedagogy for the literacy programme". Pedagogies: an international journal. 12 (2): 180–195. doi:10.1080/1554480x.2016.1245147. Wikidata Q126788835.
- Mandic, Sandra; Sandretto, Susan Elaine; Enrique García Bengoechea; Hopkins, Debbie Deborah Mary; Moore, Antoni; Judith Rodda; Wilson, Gordon Alan (2017). "Enrolling in the Closest School or Not? Implications of school choice decisions for active transport to school". Journal of transport & health. 6: 347–357. doi:10.1016/j.jth.2017.05.006. Wikidata Q126789336.
- Sandretto, Susan Elaine; Kane, Ruth G.; Chris Heath (2002). "Making the tacit explicit: A teaching intervention programme for early career academics". International Journal for Academic Development. 7 (2): 135–145. doi:10.1080/1360144032000071314. Wikidata Q126788872.
- Helen Trevethan; Sandretto, Susan Elaine (2017). "Repositioning mentoring as educative: Examining missed opportunities for professional learning". Teaching and Teacher Education. 68: 127–133. doi:10.1016/j.tate.2017.08.012. Wikidata Q126789333.
- Jane Tilson; Sandretto, Susan Elaine; Keryn Pratt (2017). "Connecting theory to practice: Using preservice teachers' beliefs, theories and video-recorded teaching to prompt a cycle of praxis". Teaching and Teacher Education. 67: 454–463. doi:10.1016/j.tate.2017.07.012. Wikidata Q126789330.
