= Susan Carroll =

Susan Carroll may refer to:

- Susan Carroll (author), American writer of romance novels
- Sue Carroll (1953–2011), English journalist
- Susan J. Carroll, American political scientist and women's studies professor
