= Millard H. Alexander =

American theoretical chemist (born 1943)

- Born: Millard Henry Alexander; February 17, 1943 (age 83); Boston, Massachusetts, USA
- Education: Harvard College (B.S., 1964); University of Paris-Sud (D.Sc., 1967)
- Known for: Quantum treatment of inelastic and reactive molecular collisions, as well as the structure of weakly bound complexes, most notably involving systems with unpaired electrons.
- Awards: Fellow, American Physical Society; Fellow, American Association for the Advancement of Science; Member, International Academy of Quantum Molecular Science; Fellow, John Simon Guggenheim Memorial Foundation
- Scientific career
- Fields: Theoretical Chemistry
- Workplaces: Harvard University (1967–1971); University of Maryland (1971–present)
- Thesis: Electron Correlation and Molecular Structure (1967)
- Doctoral advisor: Lionel Salem
- Doctoral students: Susan K. Gregurick
- Website: www2.chem.umd.edu/groups/alexander/

Millard Henry Alexander (born February 17, 1943, Boston, Massachusetts) is an American theoretical chemist. He is Distinguished University Professor at the University of Maryland, with appointments in the Department of Chemistry and Biochemistry and the Institute for Physical Science and Technology. He is the author of over 300 publications and an active researcher in the fields of molecular collision dynamics and theoretical chemistry.

== Research ==
Alexander's research focus is the quantum-mechanical aspects of molecular collisions, in particular those involving open-shell species. More specifically, Alexander's work has focused on understanding chemical reactions where the Born–Oppenheimer approximation can be violated, by means of nonadiabatic coupling, spin–orbit interactions and conical intersections. Alexander's work is particularly important in understanding the F + H_{2} → FH + H and Cl + H_{2} → HCl + H reactions.

== Organisational affiliations ==
Alexander is a fellow of the American Physical Society and of the American Association for the Advancement of Science and a member of the International Academy of Quantum Molecular Science. In 2015 he received the Herschbach Medal for contributions to the theoretical study of the dynamics of molecular collisions.

Since 2012 Alexander has served as the President of the Telluride Science Research Center.

== Selected publications ==
- Kohguchi, H.; Susuki, T.; Alexander, M. H. (2001), "Fully state-resolved differential cross sections for the inelastic scattering of the open-shell NO molecule by Ar", Science, 294 (5543): 832–834, Bibcode:2001Sci...294..832K, doi:10.1126/science.1063774, PMID 11679664, S2CID 40596186.
- Capecchi, G.; Werner, H.-J.; Alexander, M. H. (2002), "Theoretical study of the validity of the Born–Oppenheimer approximation in the Cl + H_{2} → HCl + H reaction", Science, 296 (5568): 715–718, Bibcode:2002Sci...296..715A, doi:10.1126/science.1070472, PMID 11976448, S2CID 35026826.
- Che, L.; Ren, Z. F.; Wang, X. G.; Dong, W. R.; et al. (2007), "Breakdown of the Born–Oppenheimer approximation in the F + oD_{2} → DF + D reaction", Science, 317 (5841): 1061–1064, Bibcode:2007Sci...317.1061C, doi:10.1126/science.1144984, PMID 17717180, S2CID 25111747.
- Garrand, E.; Zhou, J.; Manolopoulos, D. E.; Alexander, M. H.; Neumark, D. M. (2008), "Nonadiabatic interactions in the Cl + H_{2} reaction probed by ClH_{2}^{−} and ClD_{2}^{−} photoelectron imaging", Science, 319 (5859): 72–75, Bibcode:2008Sci...319...72G, doi:10.1126/science.1150602, PMID 18174436, S2CID 29821414.
- Wang, X. G.; Dong, W. R.; Xiao, C. L.; Che, L.; et al. (2008), "The extent of non-Born–Oppenheimer coupling in the reaction of Cl(^{2}P) with para-H_{2}", Science, 317 (5901): 573–576, Bibcode:2008Sci...322..573W, doi:10.1126/science.1163195, PMID 18948537, S2CID 206515156.
- Alexander, M. H. (2011), "Chemical Kinetics Under Test (An Invited 'Perspective')", Science, 331 (6016): 411–412, doi:10.1126/science.1201509, PMID 21273477, S2CID 206531714.
- Casavecchia, P.; Alexander, M. H. (2013), "Uncloaking the Quantum Nature of Inelastic Molecular Collisions (An Invited 'Perspective')", Science, 341 (6150): 1076–1077, doi:10.1126/science.1244109, PMID 24009384, S2CID 206551617
- Kim, J. B.; Wechman, M. L.; Sjolander, T. F.; et al. (2015), "Spectroscopic observation of resonances in the F + H_{2} reaction", Science, 349 (6247): 510–513, Bibcode:2015Sci...349..510K, doi:10.1126/science.aac6939, PMID 26228142
