= Susan Grey =

Susan or Sue Grey or Gray may refer to:

- Susan Grey, Countess of Kent (born 1554), English aristocrat
- Susan McGreivy (née Gray, 1939–2019), American swimmer and activist
- Sue Gray, Baroness Gray of Tottenham (born 1957), British civil servant and special adviser
- Dame Sue Gray (RAF officer) (born 1963), British air marshal
- Sue Grey (lawyer) (born 1962/63), New Zealand antivaxxer
- Susan Grey, fictional character in Grey's Anatomy

== See also ==
- Suzanne Gray, British meteorologist
