= Center for American Women and Politics =

U.S. politics research center

The Center for American Women and Politics (CAWP) is a unit of the Eagleton Institute of Politics at Rutgers, The State University of New Jersey. Established in 1971, it is nationally and internationally recognized as the leading source of scholarly research and current data about U.S. women's political participation. Its mission is "to promote greater knowledge and understanding about women's participation in politics and government and to enhance women's influence and leadership in public life."

The Center provides current numbers and historical data about women in U.S. politics, including information about candidates and officeholders. It also reports information about gender patterns in voting, including gender gaps and women's votes.

CAWP's research addresses emerging questions about American women's political participation. Areas of interest include candidate recruitment, candidates and campaigns, civic and political activism, the impact of women public officials, political parties, women and term limits, women political appointees, women of color in politics, and women voters and the gender gap.

== History ==
The Center for American Women and Politics was established in July 1971 at Rutgers University's Eagleton Institute of Politics with a grant from the Ford Foundation. This grant continued to fund the program for seven years. At the time there were only two women in the U.S. Senate and thirteen in the House of Representatives, no governors, and other levels of office were not counted. Because of this, many were not supportive of the research. The Center for American Women in politics was the first organization to actually identify the disparity in women's representation.

The first directors of the center were Dr. Ruth B. Mandel and Ida F.S. Schmertz. Dr. Mandel was the director of the center for 20 years. Debbie Walsh then served from 1995 to 1998 when Dr. Mary Hawkesworth took on the role. Walsh then took on the directorship again in 2001 and continues to hold that position.

== Research ==
CAWP has always focused on increasing scholarship about women in politics. One of the first outcomes of this research was a book published by the CAWP, titled The Political Participation of Women in the United States: A Selected Bibliography 1950–1976 (Scarecrow Press, 1977). In 1994, the Center hosted a meeting of 79 key leaders to establish a research agenda. The work presented at the conference was compiled to create the publication Women and American Politics: A Research Agenda for the 21st Century. This research was later updated in 2003 when Susan J. Carroll, a scholar at CAWP, resulting in Women and American Politics: New Questions, New Directions. This publication involved leading scholars of American politics and explored new avenue for studying women and politics.

In 2012, another scholar named Kira Sanbonmatsu collaborated with the Hunt Alternatives Fund's Political Parity Project to compile a research inventory, which was subsequently updated again in 2015. CAWP has become the primary source for current and historical numbers on women in politics. CAWP continues to provide research that advances scholarship on women in politics, counting and identifying women in politics, women's route to office and impact in office, women as candidates, and women as voters.
