= Anne Keefe (broadcaster) =

American radio broadcaster

Anne Keefe (February 12, 1925 - December 29, 2015) was an American radio and television broadcaster and talk show host who worked in Rochester, New York and St. Louis, Missouri. She had a major role in radio and television for 50 years. The St. Louis Dispatch described her as a pioneer and a legend.

She graduated from Sacred Heart Academy and the University of Rochester. She worked at WHAM on the radio and then on television. She also worked at WROC in Rochester and then KMOX in St Louis.

Early in her broadcasting career she had bit parts in soap operas. She appeared as part of journalist panels on C-Span. And eventually made it on to donnybrook which at the time was an all male show
