= Journal of Developmental Origins of Health and Disease =

Medical journal

- Discipline: Developmental Origins of Health and Disease
- Language: English
- Edited by: Michael G. Ross

Publication details
- History: 2010–present
- Publisher: Cambridge University Press
- Frequency: Bimonthly
- Impact factor: 2.34 (2018)

Standard abbreviations
- ISO 4: J. Dev. Orig. Health Dis.

Indexing
- ISSN: 2040-1744 (print); 2040-1752 (web)
- OCLC no.: 503445665

Links
- Journal homepage; Online access; Online archive

The Journal of Developmental Origins of Health and Disease is a bimonthly peer-reviewed medical journal covering the field of Developmental Origins of Health and Disease. It was established in 2010 and is published by Cambridge University Press on behalf of the International Society for Developmental Origins of Health and Disease. The editor-in-chief is Michael G. Ross (Harbor-UCLA Medical Center). According to the Journal Citation Reports, the journal has a 2018 impact factor of 2.34, ranking it 71st out of 185 journals in the category "Public, Environmental & Occupational Health".
