= Tracy Riley =

Academic dean and gifted education scholar

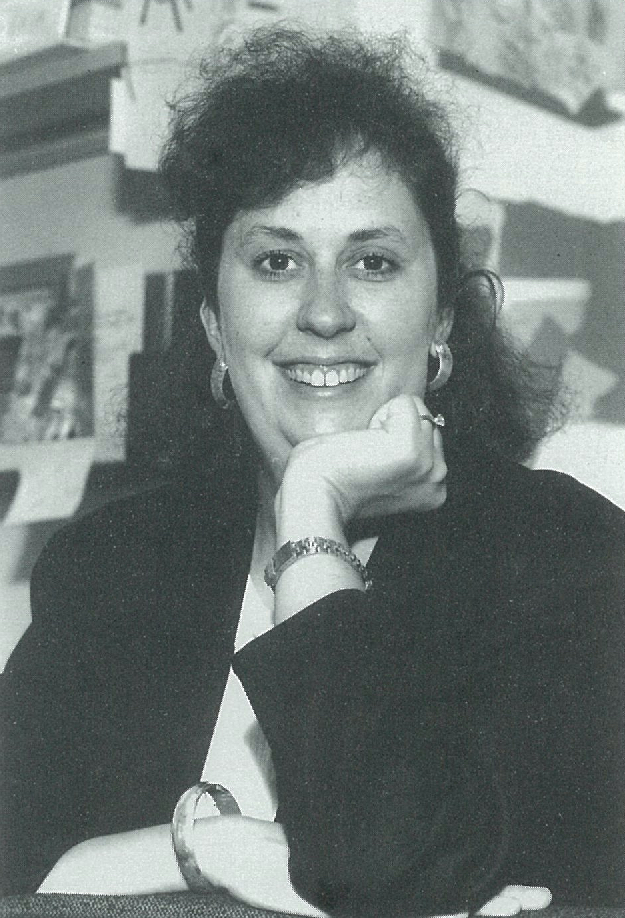
- Riley in 1996
- Born: 1966 (age 59–60)
- Awards: Sustained Excellence in Tertiary Teaching

Academic background
- Education: University of Southern Mississippi

Academic work
- Discipline: Educator
- Institutions: Massey University
- Main interests: Gifted education

Tracy L. Riley (born 1966) is an academic dean and professor of education at Massey University. She specialises in gifted education.

== Academic career ==
Riley was born in 1966. She was educated at the University of Southern Mississippi, graduating with a MEd in 1990 and PhD in 1995. She took up an academic position at Massey University in New Zealand 1996, rising to full professor effective 1 January 2020.

In 2007 Riley received a New Zealand Award for Sustained Excellence in Tertiary Teaching, in recognition of her pioneering work in eLearning and teaching research. She was presented with the giftEDnz Te Manu Kōtuku Award in April 2017.

Riley was the first chair of giftEDnz and as of 2020 continues as an elected board member. She has been New Zealand representative on the executive committee of the World Council for Gifted and Talented Children since 2017.

== Selected works ==
=== Books ===
- Riley, Tracy L (2011), Teaching gifted students in the inclusive classroom, Prufrock Press, ISBN 978-1-59363-704-0
- Karnes, Frances; Riley, Tracy (2013), The best competitions for talented kids: Win scholarships, big prize money, and recognition, Prufrock Press, ISBN 978-1-61821-130-9

=== Articles ===
- Riley, Tracy; Bicknell, Brenda (2013). "Gifted and Talented Education in New Zealand Schools: A Decade Later". Apex. 18 (1): 1–16. doi:10.21307/apex-2013-006. hdl:10289/8872. ISSN 2324-1284.
- Riley, Tracy; White, Vanessa (September 2016). "Developing a Sense of Belonging Through Engagement with Like-Minded Peers: A Matter of Equity". New Zealand Journal of Educational Studies. 51 (2): 211–225. doi:10.1007/s40841-016-0065-9. ISSN 0028-8276. S2CID 151646285.
- Riley, Tracy; Mentis, Mandia; Kearney, Alison (September 2016). "Editorial: Equity and Diversity". New Zealand Journal of Educational Studies. 51 (2): 139–142. doi:10.1007/s40841-016-0057-9. ISSN 0028-8276.
- Mentis, Mandia; Holley-Boen, Wendy; Butler, Philippa; Kearney, Alison; Budd, Julia; Riley, Tracy; MacArthur, Jude; Dharan, Vijaya; Bevan-Brown, Jill (November 2016). "Māwhai: Webbing a professional identity through networked interprofessional communities of practice". Teaching and Teacher Education. 60: 66–75. doi:10.1016/j.tate.2016.08.008.
- Riley, Tracy (16 October 2019). "Specialist Teachers of the Gifted: Positioning Their Roles in New Zealand". Australasian Journal of Gifted Education: 47–52. doi:10.21505/ajge.2019.0015. S2CID 210448803.
- Webber, Melinda; Riley, Tracy; Sylva, Katrina; Scobie-Jennings, Emma (August 2020). "The Ruamano Project: Raising Expectations, Realising Community Aspirations and Recognising Gifted Potential in Māori Boys". The Australian Journal of Indigenous Education. 49 (1): 77–88. doi:10.1017/jie.2018.16. ISSN 1326-0111. S2CID 158881157.
- Clarke, Linda; McLaughlin, Tara; Aspden, Karyn; Riley, Tracy (13 December 2020). "Supporting teachers' practice through professional learning and development: What's happening in New Zealand early childhood education?". Australasian Journal of Early Childhood. 46: 66–79. doi:10.1177/1836939120979063. ISSN 1836-9391. S2CID 230542324.
