= Growing Up in New Zealand =

New Zealand research study

- Type of project: Longitudinal study
- Location: New Zealand
- Funding: New Zealand Government
- Website: www.growingup.co.nz

The Growing Up in New Zealand longitudinal study (GUiNZ) is New Zealand's largest ongoing cohort study. It recruited and follows 6,846 New Zealand children born between 2009 and 2010—approximately 11 per cent of all children born in the country in that period. The project aims to create an in-depth summary of what life is like for children in New Zealand, and what factors affect their happiness, health, and development. The study also seeks to represent the diversity of modern-day New Zealand families, filling in current knowledge gaps on the health and wellbeing of Māori, Pasifika, and other communities. The study is run from the University of Auckland and is funded primarily by the New Zealand Government.

== History ==
The study was specifically designed to provide population-relevant and modern data on New Zealand's children in the nation, which ranked 29th out of 30 OECD countries for child health as of 2009. The study was launched in 2008, directed by Dr Susan Morton. Recruitment of more than 6000 pregnant women from the Auckland and Waikato regions began in 2009.

In April 2024, RNZ reported that the Ministry of Social Development had not renewed the contract for Growing Up in New Zealand in February 2024 despite the Sixth Labour Government's 2023 budget including NZ$30 million over the next four years to fund the study. In response to media attention, Social Development and Employment Minister Louise Upston and the University of Auckland said they were exploring functions to continue funding the Growing Up in NZ Study. In mid-September 2024, Upston confirmed that the Sixth National Government would be investing NZ$16.8 million into the longitudinal study over the next four years.

== Outcomes ==
The study has revealed important information on many issues facing New Zealand children. This includes issues such as poverty, obesity, diet, ethnic differences in healthcare access, and antenatal and postpartum depression of parents.

GUiNZ has led to key policy changes in areas such as immunisation, the Māori language, parental leave, nutrition, and household safety, improving the health and wellbeing of New Zealanders. In 2019, the Ministry of Business, Innovation and Employment awarded the study an Endeavour Fund grant. The project "Our generation, our voices, all our futures" was established to create new technological connections with the cohort and engage the broader public with the study.

== See also ==
- Dunedin Multidisciplinary Health and Development Study
