= David Keefe =

English footballer

Personal information
- Full name: David Edward Keefe
- Date of birth: 23 June 1957 (age 69)
- Place of birth: Dagenham, England
- Position: Winger

Youth career
- Southend United

Senior career*
Years	Team	Apps	(Gls)
1975–1977	Southend United	6	(1)
1977–1978	Torquay United	2	(0)
–	Ilford		
–	Epping Town		
- * Club domestic league appearances and goals

David Edward Keefe (born 23 June 1957) is an English former professional footballer who played in the Football League as a winger for Southend United and Torquay United. He was born in Dagenham.

Keefe began his football career as an apprentice with Southend United, making his league debut prior to turning professional in July 1975. He made only six appearances, scoring once, before leaving to join Torquay United in August 1977. He played only twice for Mike Green's side, draws at home to AFC Bournemouth and Darlington but couldn't establish himself in the first team, particularly with the presence of Dave Tomlin in the Torquay squad before leaving league football, joining non-league Ilford and later playing for Epping Town. he went on to have two sons named Glen Keefe and Sean Keefe who themselves went on to play football for numerous football clubs and earned many trophies and awards both playing for the Burnham Ramblers football club.
