= Susan Johnson =

Sue, Suzanne, Suzan or Susan Johnson may refer to:

== Writers ==
- Susan Johnson (American novelist) (born 1939), romance author
- Susan Johnson (Australian author) (born 1956), novelist and non-fiction writer
- Susan Lee Johnson, American historian and academic since 1980s
- Suzan Johnson Cook (born 1957), American presidential advisor, pastor, author and academic
- Sue Johnson, English clinical psychologist and couples therapist working in Canada since 1980s
- Susan Johnson (filmmaker) (born 1970), American film producer and director

== Others ==
- Susan Johnson (actress) (1927–2003), American musical theatre actress, a/k/a Susan Johnson-Kehn
- Suzanne Nora Johnson (born 1957), American corporate lawyer and executive
- Susan Johnson (bishop), Canadian Evangelical Lutheran Church National Bishop National Bishop since 2007
- Susan Johnson, Miss Minnesota 1988, American beauty pageant titleholder
- Susan Johnson (swimmer) (born 1969), American Olympian in 1988, a/k/a Susan Lipscomb
- Suzanne Bennett Johnson, American psychologist
- Susan Johnson (politician), American politician

== See also ==
- Sue Johnston (born 1943), English TV actress
- Suzanne Johnston (born 1958), Australian operatic mezzo-soprano
- Susan Johnstone (1792–1850), English-American actress
