= Susan Crowen =

American cookbook writer

Susan (Akin) Crowen (September 1, 1821 – October 7, 1870), was an American writer who published under the name, “Mrs. T.J. Crowen.”

== Biography ==
Susan Akin was born in Rensselaer County, New York, and moved with her family to New York City during her infancy. She married Thomas J. Crowen, a bookseller and publisher, in 1839, and they had seven daughters and two sons.

She wrote all of her books in the mid-1840s, but her two cookbooks were reprinted through the 1850s and 60s, and there have been reprints in the 21st century.

== Bibliography ==
- Crowen, T J Mrs (1847). The American lady's system for cookery. Comprising every variety of information for ordinary and holiday occasions. New York: Thomas J. Crowen. OCLC 192110160. Also known in subsequent editions as Mrs. Crowen's American lady's cookery book.
- Crowen, Mrs Thomas J (1848). Every lady's book : an instructor in the art of making every variety of plain and fancy cakes, pastry, confectionary, blanc mange, jellies, ice creams, also for the cooking of meats, vegetables, &c. &c. New York: T.J. Crowen. OCLC 84462056.
- Crowen, Mrs T J; Lee, Charles A (1844). The management of the sick room, with rules for diet cookery for the sick and convalescent and the treatment of the sudden illnesses and various accidents that require prompt and judicious care, comp. from the latest medical authorities. New York: J. Mowatt. OCLC 9014143.
