= Susan K. Gregurick =

American computational chemist

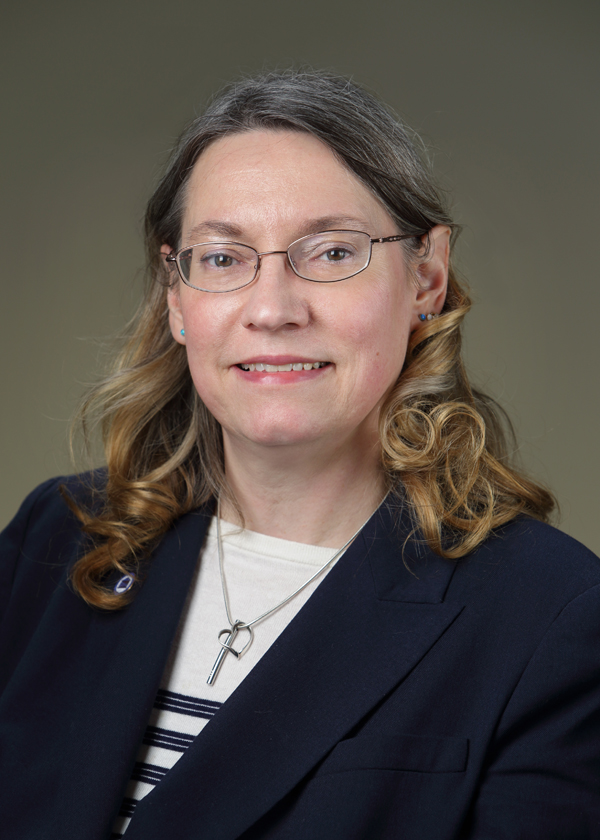
- Gregurick in 2014
- Born: Susan Kathryn Gregurick
- Education: University of Michigan; University of Maryland, College Park
- Scientific career
- Fields: Computational chemistry, data science
- Workplaces: University of Maryland, Baltimore County; National Institutes of Health
- Doctoral advisor: Millard H. Alexander

Susan Kathryn Gregurick is an American computational chemist. She is the associate director for data science at the National Institutes of Health (NIH). Gregurick is the director of the NIH Office of Data Science Strategy.

== Education ==
Gregurick received her undergraduate degree in chemistry and mathematics from the University of Michigan and her Ph.D. in physical chemistry from the University of Maryland, College Park. Her 1994 dissertation was titled A theoretical investigations [sic] into the dynamics of open-shell systems: (1) vibrational inelastic scattering of NO(²[Pi]) from Ag(111) and (2) prediction of the bend-stretch levels of ArBH(A¹[Pi]), a van [der] Waals complex. Her doctoral advisor was Millard H. Alexander.

She was a Lady Davis Postdoctoral Fellow at Hebrew University of Jerusalem and a conducted a Sloan Research Fellowship at the University of Maryland Institute for Bioscience and Biotechnology Research in Shady Grove, Maryland.

== Career ==
Gregurick was a professor of computational biology at the University of Maryland, Baltimore County where her research interests included dynamics of large macromolecules. Her areas of expertise are computational biology, high performance computing, neutron scattering and bioinformatics.

Gregurick was a program manager for the United States Department of Energy (DOE) where she developed the information and data sharing policy for the agency’s Genomics Science Program and oversaw the development and implementation of the DOE Systems Biology Knowledgebase, a framework to integrate data, models, and simulations together for a better understanding of energy and environmental processes.

Gregurick joined the National Institute of General Medical Sciences (NIGMS) in 2013. She was the division director for NIGMS biomedical technology, bioinformatics and computational biology (BBCB). Her mission in BBCB was to advance research in computational biology, behavioral and data sciences, mathematical and biostatistical methods, and biomedical technologies in support of the NIGMS mission to increase understanding of life processes.

Gregurick assisted in the development of the National Institutes of Health's (NIH) Office of Data Science Strategy (ODSS) which was established in 2018. Starting in November 2018, she served as a senior advisor to ODSS until she was appointed by Francis Collins on September 16, 2019, as NIH associate director for data science and director of the ODSS. Gregurick succeeded Philip Bourne. She received the 2020 Leadership in Biological Sciences Award from the Washington Academy of Sciences.
