= Susan Sullivan (disambiguation) =

Susan Sullivan (born 1942) is an American actress.

Susan Sullivan may also so refer to:

- Susan Sullivan (Alaska politician) (1946–2026)
- Susan Sullivan (Canadian politician)
- Sue Sullivan, fictional character in the soap opera Brookside
