= Susan Williams =

Susan Williams may refer to:

- Susan May Williams (1812–1881), American heiress
- Susan Williams (artist) (1938–2015), American artist
- Sue Hamilton (actress) (born 1945), American model and actress also known as Sue Williams
- Susan Williams (swimmer) (born 1952), British Olympic swimmer
- Susan Williams (historian) (born 1953), British historian
- Susan Williams (marine biologist) (1951–2018), American marine biologist
- Sue Williams (artist) (born 1956), Welsh visual artist
- Susan Hoffman Williams (born 1960), American legal scholar
- Susan Montgomery Williams (c. 1961–2008), American bubblegum-blower
- Susan Williams, Baroness Williams of Trafford (born 1967), British politician, life peer
- Susan Williams (triathlete) (born 1969), American triathlete
- Susan Williams (pool player) (born ?), American pool player
- Sue Williams (painter) (born 1954), American artist
- Suzy Williams (born 1953), American singer-songwriter
- Susan Williams, a character in The Grudge (2004)
