= Susan Stewart =

Susan Stewart may refer to:

- Susan Stewart (poet) (born 1952), American poet and critic
- Susan Stewart (fencer) (born 1946), Canadian Olympic fencer
- Susan Stewart (As the World Turns), character in American soap opera As the World Turns
- Susan Stewart, Miley Stewart's deceased mother in Hannah Montana
- Susan Stewart (speed skater), Susan Massitti, (born 1963), Canadian Olympic speed skater

== See also ==
- Susan McKinney Steward (1847–1918), African-American physician
- Sue Stewart (born 1969), Canadian basketball player
