= Susan Douglas =

Susan Douglas may refer to:

- Susan Douglas Rubeš (1925–2013), Canadian actress
- Sue Douglas (born 1957), British media executive
- Susan J. Douglas, American academic

== See also ==
- Susan L. Douglass, American-born Muslim
- Suzzanne Douglas (1957–2021), American actress
