= Los Angeles Business Journal =

Weekly newspaper in Los Angeles, California

- The Community of Business
- Type: Weekly newspaper
- Publisher: Josh Schimmels
- Editor: Hannah Welk
- Founded: 1979
- Language: English
- Headquarters: 11150 Santa Monica Blvd, Suite 350, Los Angeles, CA 90025
- Circulation: 22,000 (as of 2011)
- ISSN: 0194-2603
- Website: labusinessjournal.com

The Los Angeles Business Journal, established in 1979, is a weekly newspaper and online news source in Los Angeles, California, which provides coverage of local business news. According to the Journal's website, it has a weekly print circulation of about 24,000 and over 40,000 unique monthly website visitors. It is published each Monday.

== History ==
The Los Angeles Business Journal was established in 1979. In 1986, American City Business Journals acquired the LABJ with the purchase of Scripps Howard Business Journals. In 1988, ACBJ sold the Los Angeles and San Diego Business Journals to CBJ Associates.

== Awards ==
The Alliance of Area Business Publications, a professional association comprising mainly city-based business journals, recognized the Los Angeles Business Journal with seven awards in 2013 and six awards in 2012. The newspaper has been recognized with Gold Awards for Best Newspaper, Best Overall Design, Best Print Scoop, and Best Features. It has also won Silver Awards for Best Coverage of Local Breaking News, Best Special Section Design, Best Feature Layout, Best Personality Profile, and Best Use of Photography/Illustration.

In 2012, the Business Journal won three awards from the Society of American Business Editors and Writers, which is a professional association made up of newspaper business sections and other business news organizations. The awards were for General Excellence, Best Investigative Story and Best Explanatory Story.

The Los Angeles Press Club has awarded the Business Journal first place in several categories, including Best Headlines, Columnist, News Feature, Entertainment News or Feature, Business Feature. Reporter Richard Clough has also won Journalist of the Year in the Business Journal's circulation category, based on a sampling of his articles.

The Los Angeles Business Journal also hosts the Nonprofit and Corporate Citizenship Awards, recognizing philanthropic accomplishments in the city.

== Special publications ==
The editorial department of the Los Angeles Business Journal publishes over 50 reference lists within the paper, identifying the top firms in Los Angeles, and including a list of the 50 wealthiest people ("Wealthiest Angelenos"). At the end of each year, the Business Journal publishes their flagship Book of Lists, a compilation of all the lists that have run during the year.

The Los Angeles Business Journal also publishes 30+ special reports, produced by the editorial department. The special reports, lists, and supplements are all located within the pages of the paper.

The Los Angeles Business Journal publishes the "LA500" series, ranking the most influential leaders in Los Angeles. It highlights leading business executives in banking, real estate, and other industries.

== Regional editions ==
The Los Angeles Business Journal is owned by California Business Journals and is the largest of its publications:

- Los Angeles Business Journal
- San Fernando Valley Business Journal
- Orange County Business Journal
- San Diego Business Journal

== Archives ==
The photographic archives of the Los Angeles Business Journal are held in Special Collections and Archives at the University Library at California State University, Northridge.
