= Susan B. Millar =

Susan B. Millar is a senior scientist at the Wisconsin Center for Education Research (WCER) at the University of Wisconsin–Madison.

A cultural anthropologist by training, Millar focuses on organizational change processes and student and faculty learning associated with efforts to improve education in the science and engineering disciplines. In the past, she has served as lecturer for the UW-Madison's Women's Studies Program, co-director of the National Study of master's degrees, and research associate for the Penn State Center for the Study of Higher Education. She evaluates two major projects at WCER: the Systemwide Change for All Learners and Educators (a $35M Math-Science Partnership project) and the Center for the Integration of Research on Teaching and Learning (a $10M Higher Education Center for Learning and Teaching project), both funded by the National Science Foundation.

Millar is a lead evaluator for the Regional Workshop Program, a nationwide science faculty development project. She also is the external evaluator for the Center for the Advancement of Engineering Education at the University of Washington (another NSF-funded $10M Higher Education Center for Learning and Teaching project).

She also participates on the national advisory boards of various organizations seeking to improve science learning in higher education.
