= Rinki Murphy =

New Zealand professor of molecular medicine

Academic background
- Education: University of Plymouth

Academic work
- Institutions: University of Auckland, Counties Manukau District Health Board, Auckland District Health Board

Rinki Murphy is a New Zealand endocrinologist, and is a full professor of molecular medicine at the University of Auckland, specialising in diabetes pathophysiology and precision medicine.

== Academic career ==
Murphy undertook her medical training at the University of Auckland, before completing a PhD at the University of Plymouth. Murphy then joined the faculty of the University of Auckland, rising to full professor. Murphy works as a physician in the Auckland and Counties Manukau District Health Boards. Murphy is a member of the Maurice Wilkins Centre for Molecular Biodiscovery, a New Zealand Centre of Research Excellence. Murphy is an emeritus member of the Healthier Lives National Science Challenge. She is a Fellow of the Royal Australasian College of Physicians. From 2019, Murphy served two years as the Honorary Medical Director of the Diabetes Foundation Aotearoa.

Murphy is a diabetologist, and studies the pathophysiology of diabetes and obesity. She aims to use genetics to identify biomarkers for diabetes risk in order to develop precision medicine treatment strategies. Her research identified that New Zealand patients would benefit from greater genetic testing for a specific rare type of diabetes, monogenic diabetes. Patients with monogenic diabetes are frequently misdiagnosed as having Type 2 diabetes and may be treated with insulin, when precision medicine shows they are generally better off on tablets. Murphy also led research that showed bariatric surgery in New Zealand was a 'postcode lottery'.

Murphy leads a specialist weight management service Te Mana Ki Tua that was opened in June 2023. The unit serves the south Auckland area.

== Selected works ==
- Rinki Murphy; Ellard, Sian; Hattersley, Andrew (2008). "Clinical implications of a molecular genetic classification of monogenic beta-cell diabetes". Nature Clinical Practice Endocrinology and Metabolism. 4 (4): 200–213. doi:10.1038/ncpendmet0778. PMID 18301398. Wikidata Q37095214.
- Slykerman, Rebecca F.; Hood, F; Wickens, Kristin; et al. (2017). "Effect of Lactobacillus rhamnosus HN001 in Pregnancy on Postpartum Symptoms of Depression and Anxiety: A Randomised Double-blind Placebo-controlled Trial". EBioMedicine. 24: 159–165. doi:10.1016/j.ebiom.2017.09.013. PMC 5652021. PMID 28943228. Wikidata Q42651889.
- Das, Stephanie; Singh, Primal P; Phillips, Anthony; Rinki Murphy; Windsor, John Albert; Petrov, Maxim (2013). "Newly diagnosed diabetes mellitus after acute pancreatitis: a systematic review and meta-analysis". Gut. 63 (5): 818–831. doi:10.1136/gutjnl-2013-305062. PMID 23929695. Wikidata Q38127652.
- Rinki Murphy; Turnbull, D M; Walker, M; Andrew Tym Hattersley (2008). "Clinical features, diagnosis and management of maternally inherited diabetes and deafness (MIDD) associated with the 3243A>G mitochondrial point mutation". Diabetic Medicine. 25 (4): 383–399. doi:10.1111/j.1464-5491.2008.02359.x. PMID 18294221. Wikidata Q37092297.
- Rinki Murphy; Tsai, Peter; Jüllig, Mia; Amy Liu; Plank, Lindsay Dudley; Michael Booth (2016). "Differential Changes in Gut Microbiota After Gastric Bypass and Sleeve Gastrectomy Bariatric Surgery Vary According to Diabetes Remission". Obesity Surgery. 27 (4): 917–925. doi:10.1007/s11695-016-2399-2. PMID 27738970. Wikidata Q46478242.
- Braithwaite, Irene; Stewart, Alistair W.; Hancox, Robert; Beasley, Richard Charles; Rinki Murphy; Mitchell, Edwin Arthur; ISAAC Phase Three Study Group (2014). "Fast-food consumption and body mass index in children and adolescents: an international cross-sectional study". BMJ Open. 4 (12) e005813. doi:10.1136/bmjopen-2014-005813. PMC 4265088. PMID 25488096. Wikidata Q34692157.
- Healey, Genelle Rose; Rinki Murphy; Butts, Christine Ann; Brough, Louise; Whelan, Kevin; Coad, Jane (2018). "Habitual dietary fibre intake influences gut microbiota response to an inulin-type fructan prebiotic: a randomised, double-blind, placebo-controlled, cross-over, human intervention study". British Journal of Nutrition. 119 (2): 176–189. doi:10.1017/s0007114517003440. PMID 29307330. Wikidata Q47747840.
