= Susan Powell =

Susan Powell may refer to:

- Susan Powell (Miss America) (born 1959), American actress, singer, and television personality
- Susan Powell (weather forecaster) (born 1976/75), British weather reporter for the BBC
- Susan Powell (cyclist) (born 1967), Australian Paralympic cyclist
- Susan Marie Powell (born 1981), American woman disappearing in 2009
- Sue Powell, member of the band Dave & Sugar (active 1975–1982)

== See also ==
- Sue Powell-Reed (active since 1980), Welsh radio & television broadcaster
- Susan Noel-Powell (1912–1991), English squash and tennis player
- Sue Johanson (née Powell; 1930–2023), Canadian sex educator.
