= Johanna Montgomery =

New Zealand professor of physiology

- Awards: James Cook Research Fellowship, The Katharine McCormick Advanced Postdoctoral Scholar Fellowship to Support Women in Academic Medicine, Fulbright Scholarship, The Eppendorf & Science Prize for Neurobiology

Academic background
- Education: University of Otago

Johanna Michelle Montgomery is a New Zealand academic, and is professor of physiology at the University of Auckland, specialising in synaptic plasticity in brain cells. She also works on nerve cells in the heart associated with atrial fibrillation.

== Academic career ==
Montgomery was born and raised in New Zealand. She completed a PhD titled Neural influences on the regulation of acetylcholine receptor expression at the University of Otago in 1998. She spent five years as a postdoctoral researcher at Stanford University, investigating the plasticity of neurons in the hippocampal region of the brain. Montgomery joined the faculty of the University of Auckland in 2004, rising to associate professor in 2014 and full professor in 2023. Her research investigates the connections between neural cells, and how these change, including their formation and elimination (synaptic plasticity). She also investigates how synaptic dysfunction may relate to autism, as part of the Mind for Minds research network.

== Awards and honours ==
In 2005 Montgomery won the Eppendorf and Science Prize for Neurobiology, becoming the first southern hemisphere winner. She was awarded a Kellaway Medical Research Fellowship in 2015, the Royal Society London Colin Pillinger International Exchanges Award in 2016 and the Physiological Society of New Zealand's Excellence in Research Award in 2019.

In 2021 she was awarded a James Cook Research Fellowship to study clusters of nerve cells, called ganglionated plexi, in the heart. Montgomery's research investigated the mechanisms by which these plexi control heart rhythm, and involved measuring signals from these nerve cells in human patients during open heart surgery, the first time such measurements had been done on humans. The research aims to shed light on the role of ganglionated plexi in atrial fibrillation, with has relevance for stroke, dementia and heart failure research.

== Selected works ==
- Okunola Jeyifous; Clarissa L Waites; Specht, Christian; et al. (2009). "SAP97 and CASK mediate sorting of NMDA receptors through a previously unknown secretory pathway". Nature Neuroscience. 12 (8): 1011–1019. doi:10.1038/nn.2362. PMC 2779056. PMID 19620977. Wikidata Q39822723.
- J M Montgomery; Pavlidis, Paul; D V Madison (2001). "Pair recordings reveal all-silent synaptic connections and the postsynaptic expression of long-term potentiation". Neuron. 29 (3): 691–701. doi:10.1016/s0896-6273(01)00244-6. PMID 11301028. Wikidata Q28212237.
- Montgomery, Johanna; Daniel V Madison (2004). "Discrete synaptic states define a major mechanism of synapse plasticity". Trends in Neurosciences. 27 (12): 744–50. doi:10.1016/j.tins.2004.10.006. PMID 15541515. Wikidata Q28293002.
- Magali H Arons; Charlotte J Thynne; Andreas M. Grabrucker; Dong Li; Michael Schoen; Cheyne, Juliette E.; Tobias M Boeckers; Montgomery, Johanna; Craig C Garner (2012). "Autism-associated mutations in ProSAP2/Shank3 impair synaptic transmission and neurexin-neuroligin-mediated transsynaptic signaling". The Journal of Neuroscience. 32 (43): 14966–14978. doi:10.1523/jneurosci.2215-12.2012. PMC 3752148. PMID 23100419. Wikidata Q37117518.
- Montgomery, Johanna; Daniel V Madison (2002). "State-dependent heterogeneity in synaptic depression between pyramidal cell pairs". Neuron. 33 (5): 765–777. doi:10.1016/s0896-6273(02)00606-2. PMID 11879653. Wikidata Q43906190.
- J M Montgomery; P L Zamorano; C C Garner (2004). "MAGUKs in synapse assembly and function: an emerging view". Cellular and Molecular Life Sciences. 61 (7–8): 911–929. doi:10.1007/s00018-003-3364-5. PMID 15095012. Wikidata Q35750293.
