= Susan (film) =

- Directed by: Mahmoud Shoolizadeh
- Written by: Mahmoud Shoolizadeh
- Produced by: Mahmoud Shoolizadeh
- Starring: Jennifer Preston, Mitchell Thornton, Ville Loikkanen, Holly Lawton, Hannah Templeton-Cox, Christopher Mulvin, Stephen Clark, Amanda Davidge, Brandon McConnell, Jennifer Roach.
- Cinematography: Jesse Mickel
- Edited by: Mahmoud Shoolizadeh
- Music by: George Palousis
- Release date: 2018
- Running time: 98 minutes
- Country: United Kingdom
- Language: English

Susan is a feature film produced and directed by Mahmoud Shoolizadeh, that has participated in several international film festivals in 2018 and 2019, and has received several awards and nominations. The movie was filmed in London.

== Plot ==
"SUSAN is a story of Love and War. A feature social drama film about Susan who lives in London, England with her loving family. She loses her husband in the Afghanistan war; she suffers but keeps her Love and hope alive. In this film Susan represents a symbol of love and kindness. She faces many challenges in her life, though she tries hard to keep the kindness and love, even in the very difficult circumstances she is facing. While she is alone, full of pain and misery, one unexpected moment happens and this is just the beginning!"

== Reception ==
Several reviews of the film have been published in media by elite film critiques, including a positive review on Florida's influx magazine explaining how the movie brings the audience out of their comfort zones and into a difficult to watch reality. An interview with the film director published on The Florida Times Union depicting the director's review and purpose for this genre.

== Awards and nominees ==
- Award Winner of the Best Feature Film (Mahmoud Shoolizadeh) at the "Mediterranean Film Festival Cannes", Cannes, France, November 2019.
- Award Winner of the Best Lead Actress (Jennifer Preston) at the "Mediterranean Film Festival Cannes", Cannes, France, November 2019
- Award Winner of the Best Lead Actress (Jennifer Preston) at the "Great Lakes State International Film Festival", Bay City, Michigan, USA, August 2019
- Nominee for the Best Drama Feature Award (Mahmoud Shoolizadeh) at the "Genre Celebretion International Film Festival", Tokyo, Japan, June 2019
- Nominee for the Best Actress Award (Jennifer Preston) at the "Genre Celebration International Film Festival", Tokyo, Japan, June 2019
- Nominee for the Best Feature Film Award (Mahmoud Shoolizadeh) at the "Hong Kong Art Film International Film Festival", Hong Kong, June 2019
- Nominee for the Best Lead Actress Award (Jennifer Preston) at the "Hong Kong Art Film International Film Festival", Hong Kong, June 2019
- Award Winner of the Best Director (Mahmoud Shoolizadeh) at the "Eurasian Creative Guild Film Festival", London, United Kingdom, June 2019
- Award Winner of the Best Feature Film (Mahmoud Shoolizadeh) at the "Under The Stars International Film Festival", Fellini Edition, Beri, Italy, 2019
- Award Winner of the Best UK Narrative-Feature film (Mahmoud Shoolizadeh) at the "London International Motion Picture Awards", London, United Kingdom, May 2019
- Nominee for the Best Drama Feature Film Award (Mahmoud Shoolizadeh) at the "Independent Film Awards-London", London, United Kingdom, April 2019.
- Award for the Best International Feature Film (Mahmoud Shoolizadeh) at the "Olympus International Film Festival - Los Angeles", California, USA, July 2019
- Award for the Best Feature Fiction Film (Mahmoud Shoolizadeh) at the Branson International Film Festival, Branson, Missouri, USA, April 2019
- Nominee for the Best Lead Actress (Jennifer Preston) at the Branson International Film Festival, Branson, Missouri, USA, April 2019
- Nominee for the Best Lead Actor (Mitchell Thornton) at the Branson International Film Festival, Branson, Missouri, USA, April 2019
- Nominee for the Best Cinematographer (Jesse Mickel) at the Branson International Film Festival, Branson, Missouri, USA, April 2019
- Nominee for the Best Young Actress (Holly Lawton) at the Branson International Film Festival, Branson, Missouri, USA, April 2019
- Nominee for the Best Supporting actor (Christopher Mulvin) at the Branson International Film Festival, Branson, Missourie, USA, April 2019
- Nominee for the Best Narrative Full Length Film Award (Mahmoud Shoolizadeh) at the "Independent Talents International Film Festival", Blooming, Indiana, USA, February 2019
- Nominee for the Best Feature Film at the 5th Erie International Film Festival, Erie, Pennsylvania, USA, December 2018
- Award for the Best Editing Feature Film at the Five Continents International Film Festival, Puerto La Cruz, Venezuela, November 2018
- Award for Special Mention Director Mahmoud Shoolizadeh at the Five Continents International Film Festival, Puerto La Cruz, Venezuela, November 2018
- Award for the Best Drama Feature Film Mahmoud Shoolizadeh at the Five Continents International Film Festival, Puerto La Cruz, Venezuela, November 2018
- Award for the Best Actress (Jennifer Preston) at the Top Indie Film Awards, Los Angeles, California, USA, October 2018
- Nominee for the Best Cinematographer (Jesse Mickle) at the Top Indie Film Awards, Los Angeles, California, USA, October 2018
- Nominee for the Best Music Composer (George Palousis) at the Top Indie Film Awards, Los Angeles, California, USA, October 2018
- Nominee for the Best Feature Film at the Top Indie Film Awards, Los Angeles, California, USA, October 2018
