= Suzanne Gray =

British meteorologist

Suzanne Gray is a British expert in dynamical meteorology and professor of meteorology at the University of Reading, where she is currently academic head of the Department of Meteorology. She has made significant contributions to the understanding and prediction of extreme windstorms and tropical cyclones.

== Education and research career ==
Gray completed a BA in Natural Sciences (specialising in theoretical physics) at Cambridge University in 1993. She moved to the University of Reading and completed a PhD in 1996 on the intensification and eye dynamics of tropical cyclones with Dr George Craig. Since 1996 she has worked in a number of research and teaching roles within the Department of Meteorology at the University of Reading, becoming Professor of Meteorology in 2013.

Gray's research can be categorized into four key themes: predictability, mesoscale and convective processes, climatologies, and pollutant transport by weather systems, across approximately 100 scientific publications. The range of natural weather phenomena is reflected in the range of her work and includes convective clouds, mesoscale ‘sting jets’ in extreme windstorms, extratropical and tropical cyclones, polar lows and weather regimes (persistent weather patterns).

== Awards and recognition ==
2018–present: Editor of the Nature Partner Journal, Climate and Atmospheric Science

2017: Awarded the Buchan prize of the Royal Meteorological Society for "important original contributions to meteorology".

2014: Lead author of "Dynamics and predictability of middle latitude weather systems and their higher and lower latitude interactions" from the World Meteorological Organisation assessment of Seamless Prediction of the Earth System

2013–2017: Editor of the journal Atmospheric Science Letters

2012–2014: Editor of the journal Monthly Weather Review

2012: Shortlisted for the Lloyd's Science of Risk Prize

2010–present: Member of the Natural Environment Research Council (NERC) Peer Review College, including a core member of panel B since 2017.

2001: Awarded the L.F. RIchardson prize of the Royal Meteorological Society for her publication "‘Analysis of the eyes formed in simulated tropical cyclones and polar lows"
