= Ruth Kane =

New Zealand professor of education

Academic background
- Education: James Cook University, Griffith University, Griffith University
- Thesis: Knowledge in action: a longitudinal study of the propositional and procedural knowledge base of the beginning teacher (1993)

Academic work
- Institutions: University of Otago, Massey University, University of Ottawa
- Doctoral students: Alison Kearney

Ruth G. Kane is a New Zealand academic, and is a full professor at the University of Ottawa, where she was the Director of Teacher Education and Director of Graduate Studies (Anglophone). Kane's research focuses on equity in teacher education, including decolonisation.

== Academic career ==
Kane has a Diploma in Teaching, a Bachelor of Arts in geography and economics, and a postgraduate diploma in Aboriginal and Torres Strait Islander Education from James Cook University. Before entering academia she was a high school teacher in Australia. She completed a Master of Education with Honours titled Knowledge in action: a longitudinal study of the propositional and procedural knowledge base of the beginning teacher at Griffith University. Kane was Director of Teacher Education at the University of Otago, before joining the faculty of Massey University, where she was Professor of Secondary Education. Kane moved to the University of Ottawa in 2006, where was Director of Teacher Education and Director of Graduate Studies (Anglophone) from 2015 to 2021. She holds an adjunct position at Victoria University of Wellington. Kane was elected as secretary on the International Study Association on Teachers and Teaching executive committee from 2021.

Kane co-leads the Equity Knowledge Network, an Ontario Ministry of Education-funded initiative hosted at the University of Ottawa aimed at breaking down systemic barriers to inclusion for marginalised children and young people. Kane also co-leads a three-year collaboration between five universities, funded by Arctic-Net, to study education in the Inuit Nunangat jurisdiction. Kane has received research funding from the Social Sciences and Humanities Research Council to research ways to increase community building for isolated communities using social media.

== Selected works ==
- Kane, R., Ng-A-Fook, N., Pinar, W. F., & Phelan, A. M. (2020). Reconceptualizing Teacher Education : A Canadian Contribution to a Global Challenge. University of Ottawa Press ISBN 0-7766-3112-8
- Kane, Ruth G.; Andrew Francis (2013). "Preparing teachers for professional learning: is there a future for teacher education in new teacher induction?". Teacher Development. 17 (3): 362–379. doi:10.1080/13664530.2013.813763. Wikidata Q129976361.
- Nicholas Ng-A-Fook; Kane, Ruth G.; Jesse Butler; Lisa Glithero; Rita Forte (2015). "Brokering knowledge mobilization networks: Policy reforms, partnerships, and teacher education". Education Policy Analysis Archives. 23: 122. doi:10.14507/epaa.v23.2090. Wikidata Q129976358.
- Fontaine, Sylvie; Kane, Ruth G.; Olivier Duquette; Lorraine Savoie-Zajc (16 February 2012), New Teachers’ Career Intentions: Factors Influencing New Teachers’ Decisions to Stay or to Leave the Profession, pp. Vol. 57 No. 4 (2011): Winter, doi:10.11575/ajer.v57i4.55525, Wikidata Q129976363
