= Lake Susan =

Lake in the state of Minnesota, United States

- Location within Minnesota
- Location: Carver County, Minnesota
- Coordinates: 44°51′6″N 93°32′28″W
- Type: lake

Lake Susan is a lake in Carver County, Minnesota, in the United States. It is 88 acres (36 hectares) in size and has a maximum depth of 17 feet (5 meters).

Lake Susan was named for Susan Hazeltine, a local schoolteacher; Hazeltine Lake is also named for her family.

== See also ==
- List of lakes in Minnesota
