= Susan J. Carroll =

American political scientist

- Education: Miami University; Indiana University Bloomington
- Scientific career
- Fields: Political science
- Workplaces: Rutgers University

Susan J. Carroll is an American political scientist. She is a professor of political science and Women's and Gender Studies at Rutgers University. She is also a Senior Scholar at the Center for American Women and Politics in the Eagleton Institute of Politics. She studies women in politics, particularly the factors that affect the success of women candidates for election to American public office, and the gendered effects of institutions in American politics.

== Early work and education ==
Carroll studied history at Miami University in Oxford, Ohio, graduating with a BA in 1972. She then received an MA in political science at Indiana University Bloomington in 1975, followed by a PhD there in political science in 1980.

== Career ==
In addition to dozens of peer-reviewed articles, Carroll has been an author or editor of four books. She was the sole author of her first book, Women as Candidates in American Politics, which was published in its first edition in 1985 and then re-printed in a second edition in 1994. The book includes an original survey of 1,212 questionnaires completed by about 63% of all the women who ran as major party candidates for state legislature or higher offices in 1976^{[a]} (the survey was sent to 1,936 women, which represented the universe of possible respondents). The book used these survey results to seek explanations for women's low rate of election, and identifies an array of structural issues which depress the election rate of women candidates. Summarizing this finding, Philo C. Washburn wrote that "Carroll's data and analysis tend to support her position that political opportunity variables explain women's political underrepresentation better than do explanations in terms of qualities over which women candidates have control". In the book's second edition, Carroll repeated her analysis for women as candidates for American public office in the 1990s. In a review of the second edition, Kathleen E. Kendall called the first edition "a pioneering work", which is notable for "focusing particularly on the question of why women were so under-represented in public office".

Carroll was an editor of the 2001 book The Impact of Women in Public Office, and the 2003 volume Women and American Politics: New Questions, New Directions. With the political scientist Richard L. Fox she also co-edited Gender and Elections: Shaping the Future of American Politics, which was published in its first edition in 2006 and in a second edition in 2010.

Carroll was a founder and president of the Organized Section for Women and Politics Research within the American Political Science Association. Carroll has also been credited with helping to found the women and politics program at Rutgers University.

In 2006, Carroll was given the Outstanding Professional Achievement Award from the Women's Caucus of the Midwest Political Science Association, which "recognizes a senior woman in the discipline who has made a substantial contribution to the scholarship of political science (not necessarily in the field of women and politics), who has made significant contributions to the profession and its associations, who has actively mentored women at her own institution or elsewhere, and who serves as a positive role model for women in the profession".

Carroll's work has been cited extensively in the news media, including in The New York Times, CNN, Ms. magazine, and the Los Angeles Times.

== Selected works ==
- Women as Candidates in American Politics (1985)
- Gender and Elections: Shaping the Future of American Politics, co-editor with Richard L. Fox (2006)

== Selected awards ==
- Outstanding Professional Achievement Award, Midwest Political Science Association

== Notes ==
1.Other sources have erroneously reported that the book is concerned with the 1956 election. It is a study of the 1976 election.
