= Anne Keefe (theatre director) =

American theatre director

Anne Keefe was the associate artistic director at the Westport Country Playhouse in Westport, Connecticut. She resigned, effective 25 September 2006, after seven seasons at the playhouse, only to return in Spring of 2008 alongside Co-Artistic Director Joanne Woodward.

She is married to David Wiltse, the Playhouse's playwright-in-residence.

Prior to working at the Westport Country Playhouse, Keefe worked as a professional production stage manager and production supervisor from 1973. Some of her notable productions are The Changing Room, American Buffalo, Spokesong, Death and the Maiden, Hamlet, Night Must Fall, and Our Town.
