= Susan Keefe =

American anthropologist and author

Susan Elaine Emley Keefe (born 1947) is an American anthropologist and author. She is a professor emerita at Appalachian State University. Keefe has published books on Mexican-American culture and Appalachian health issues.

== Life ==
Susan Elaine Emley Keefe was born in 1947 in Spokane, Washington. She attended a one-room school in Priest Lake. Her family later relocated to southern California. Keefe completed a bachelor of arts in anthropology in from University of California, Santa Barbara where she also earned a master of arts in anthropology in 1971 and a doctor of philosophy in 1974. Her dissertation was titled Women in power: Anglo and Mexican American female leaders in two Southern California communities.

In 1993, Keefe was the chair of the department of anthropology at Appalachian State University. She is a recognized scholar on Appalachian health issues. Her research includes the areas of ethnicity, modernity, culture change, social organization, and medical and applied anthropology. She has researched the Appalachian region and Mexican-Americans. Keefe is a professor emerita of anthropology at Appalachian State University. Keefe has published books on Mexican-American culture and Appalachian health issues.

Keefe has lived in Blowing Rock, North Carolina for over 30 years.

== Selected works ==
- Keefe, Susan E.; Padilla, Amado M.; Carlos, Manuel L. (1978). Emotional support systems in two cultures: a comparison of Mexican Americans and anglo Americans. Spanish Speaking Mental Health Research Center.
- Keefe, Susan Emley; Padilla, Amado M. (1987). Chicano ethnicity. University of New Mexico Press. ISBN 978-0826309921.
- Keefe, Susan E. (1989). Negotiating ethnicity: the impact of anthropological theory and practice. National Association for the Practice of Anthropology. ISBN 9781444307016.
- Keefe, Susan E. (2005). Appalachian cultural competency: a guide for medical, mental health, and social service professionals. University of Tennessee Press. ISBN 9781572333338.
- Keefe, Susan E. (2009). Participatory development in Appalachia: cultural identity, community, and sustainability. University of Tennessee Press. ISBN 9781572336575.
- Keefe, Susan E. (1988). Appalachian Mental Health. The University Press of Kentucky. ISBN 9780813158778.
