= Susan Morton (academic) =

New Zealand epidemiologist

- Awards: Member of the New Zealand Order of Merit

Academic background
- Education: Victoria University of Wellington, University of Auckland, London School of Hygiene and Tropical Medicine, Auckland College of Education
- Thesis: Life course determinants of offspring size at birth: an intergenerational study of Aberdeen women (2002)
- Doctoral advisor: David A Leon

Academic work
- Institutions: University of Auckland, University of Technology Sydney
- Doctoral students: Jacquie Bay

Susan Mary Bennett Morton MNZM is a New Zealand epidemiologist, and is a full professor of public health at the University of Technology Sydney, specialising in longitudinal studies of public health. In 2019, Morton was appointed a Member of the New Zealand Order of Merit for services to epidemiology and public health research.

== Academic career ==
Morton completed a Bachelor with Honours degree in pure mathematics at Victoria University of Wellington, and taught mathematics in Lower Hutt before undertaking a medical degree at the University of Auckland. She also holds a teaching diploma from the Auckland College of Education. She was awarded a Commonwealth Scholarship to study at the London School of Hygiene and Tropical Medicine, where she earned a PhD with a thesis titled Life course determinants of offspring size at birth: an intergenerational study of Aberdeen women. She worked on a dataset collected by Raymond Illsley, Professor of Medical Sociology at the University of Aberdeen in the 1960s, and showed that a woman's childhood social environment and growth influenced the birth weight of her children. At this point she became interested in longitudinal studies, and "the opportunity to provide evidence that could inform policy and make a difference by actually understanding what lived realities were about, rather than just looking at routine statistics or big data."

Morton returned to New Zealand and joined the faculty of the University of Auckland, where she was appointed full professor in 2019. Morton established the Centre for Longitudinal Research at the University of Auckland in 2010, and was the inaugural director of the centre. She was the director and principal investigator of the Growing Up in New Zealand longitudinal study until 2022. In early 2023 Morton was appointed as the inaugural Director of INSIGHT, a pan-university research centre focused on population health, based at the University of Technology Sydney.

== Honours and awards ==
In 2019, Morton was appointed a Member of the New Zealand Order of Merit for services to epidemiology and public health research.

== Selected works ==
- Stavola, Bianca; Dorothea Nitsch; Isabel dos Santos Silva; McCormack, Valerie; Hardy, Rebecca; Vera Mann; Cole, Tim; Morton, Susan Mary; Leon, David (2005). "Statistical issues in life course epidemiology". American Journal of Epidemiology. 163 (1): 84–96. doi:10.1093/aje/kwj003. PMID 16306313. Wikidata Q36321515.
- Chris Power; Kuh, Diana; Morton, Susan Mary (2013). "From developmental origins of adult disease to life course research on adult disease and aging: insights from birth cohort studies". Annual Review of Public Health. 34: 7–28. doi:10.1146/annurev-publhealth-031912-114423. PMID 23514315. Wikidata Q38091515.
- Gluckman, Peter David; Hanson, Mark Adrian; Morton, Susan Mary; Catherine S Pinal (2004). "Life-long echoes--a critical analysis of the developmental origins of adult disease model". Neonatology. 87 (2): 127–139. doi:10.1159/000082311. PMID 15564779. Wikidata Q35963724.
- Rajneeta Saraf; Morton, Susan Mary; Carlos A Camargo; Grant, Cameron Charles (2015). "Global summary of maternal and newborn vitamin D status - a systematic review". Maternal Child Nutrition. 12 (4): 647–668. doi:10.1111/mcn.12210. PMC 6860156. PMID 26373311. Wikidata Q38587420.
- Morton, Susan Mary; Atatoa, Polly Elizabeth; Grant, Cameron Charles; et al. (2012). "Cohort profile: growing up in New Zealand". International Journal of Epidemiology. 42 (1): 65–75. doi:10.1093/ije/dyr206. PMID 22253317. Wikidata Q45882316.
- Lawlor, Deborah; George David Batty; Morton, Susan Mary; Heather Clark; Sally Macintyre; Leon, David (2005). "Childhood socioeconomic position, educational attainment, and adult cardiovascular risk factors: the Aberdeen children of the 1950s cohort study". American Journal of Public Health. 95 (7): 1245–1251. doi:10.2105/ajph.2004.041129. PMC 1449347. PMID 15983276. Wikidata Q57127260.
