= San Diego Business Journal =

Weekly newspaper in San Diego, California

- The Community of Business
- Type: Weekly newspaper
- Format: Tabloid
- Owner(s): California Business Journals
- Publisher: Huntley Paton; Armon Mills (publisher emeritus)
- Editor: Reo Carr
- Managing editor: Tony Quesada
- Founded: 1980
- Language: English
- Headquarters: San Diego Business Journal; 4909 Murphy Canyon Rd., Suite 200; San Diego, CA 92123
- Circulation: 15,610
- Price: Cover Price: $2.00
- ISSN: 8750-6890
- Website: sdbj.com

The San Diego Business Journal (SDBJ) is a weekly newspaper in San Diego, California. It covers companies, industries and business people throughout San Diego County. The journal collects data and statistics on San Diego companies across all industries. Each of these surveys is then compiled into the San Diego Business Journal’s resource – the annual "Book of Lists".

== History ==
The San Diego Business Journal was established in 1980. In 1986, American City Business Journals acquired the journal with the purchase of Scripps Howard Business Journals. In 1988, ACBJ sold the Los Angeles and San Diego Business Journals to a group led by Kansas City developer Larry Bridges.

Armon Mills was named publisher in 2004. In August 2016, Huntley Paton was announced as the new publisher and president of the journal, effective September 1, 2016. Kevin Leap is currently the president and publisher, while Jeff Clemetson is editor-in-chief as of 2023.

== Regional editions ==
- Los Angeles Business Journal
- Orange County Business Journal
- San Diego Business Journal
- San Fernando Business Journal
