= Suzanne Purdy =

New Zealand researcher

Suzanne Purdy CNZM
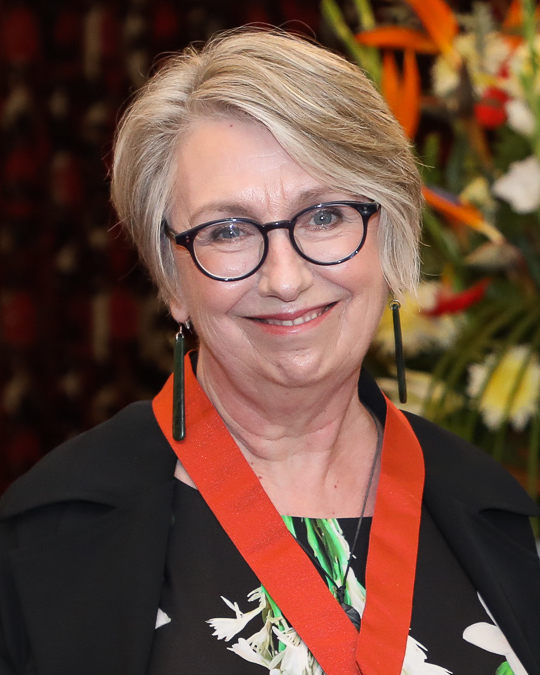
- Purdy in 2022
- Education: University of Iowa
- Scientific career
- Fields: Auditory processing and hearing loss
- Workplaces: University of Auckland
- Thesis: Reliability, sensitivity, and validity of magnitude estimation, paired comparisons, and category scaling (1990)

Suzanne Carolyn Purdy CNZM is a New Zealand psychology academic specialising in auditory processing and hearing loss. She is currently a full professor and head of the School of Psychology at the University of Auckland.

== Academic career ==
After a 1990 PhD titled Reliability, sensitivity, and validity of magnitude estimation, paired comparisons, and category scaling at the University of Iowa, Purdy moved to the University of Auckland, rising to full professor in 2012.

In the 2021 Queen's Birthday Honours, Purdy was appointed a Companion of the New Zealand Order of Merit, for services to audiology and communication science.

== Selected works ==
- Sharma, Mridula; Purdy, Suzanne C; Kelly, Andrea S. (2009). "Comorbidity of auditory processing, language, and reading disorders". Journal of Speech, Language, and Hearing Research. 52 (3): 706–722. doi:10.1044/1092-4388(2008/07-0226). PMID 19064904.
- Sharma, M.; Purdy, S. C.; Newall, P.; Wheldall, K.; Beaman, R.; Dillon, H. (2006). "Electrophysiological and behavioral evidence of auditory processing deficits in children with reading disorder". Clinical Neurophysiology. 117 (5): 1130–1144. doi:10.1016/j.clinph.2006.02.001. PMID 16564738. S2CID 24177589.
- Kelly, Andrea S.; Purdy, Suzanne C.; Thorne, Peter R. (2005). "Electrophysiological and speech perception measures of auditory processing in experienced adult cochlear implant users". Clinical Neurophysiology. 116 (6): 1235–1246. doi:10.1016/j.clinph.2005.02.011. PMID 15978485. S2CID 29485833.
- Purdy, Suzanne C.; Kelly, Andrea S.; Davies, Merren G. (2002). "Auditory brainstem response, middle latency response, and late cortical evoked potentials in children with learning disabilities". Journal of the American Academy of Audiology. 13 (7): 367–382. doi:10.1055/s-0040-1715981. PMID 12199513.
- Jerram, J. C.; Purdy, Suzanne C. (2001). "Technology, expectations, and adjustment to hearing loss: predictors of hearing aid outcome". Journal of the American Academy of Audiology. 12 (2): 64–79. doi:10.1055/s-0042-1745582. PMID 11261460. S2CID 29842111.
