= Mau rākau =

Traditional Māori martial art

- Focus: Weaponry
- Country of origin: New Zealand
- Creator: Various
- Famous practitioners: Cliff Curtis, Temuera Morrison
- Olympic sport: No

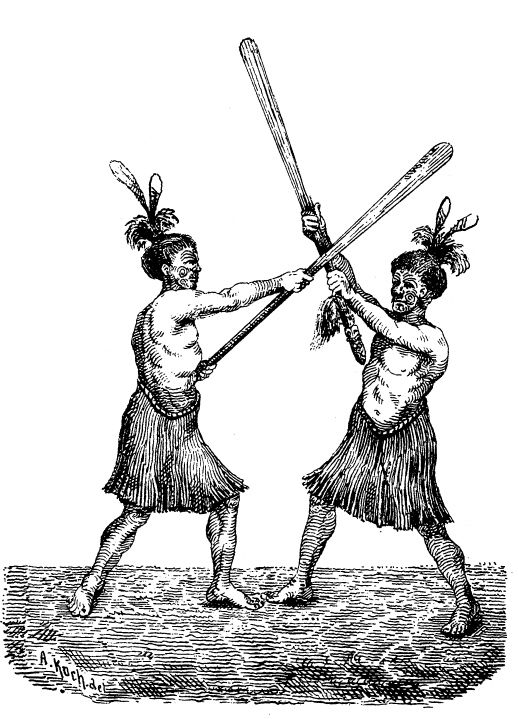
Taiaha - 'fourth position'

Mau rākau, meaning "to bear a weapon", is a martial art based on traditional Māori weapons.

== Weapons ==
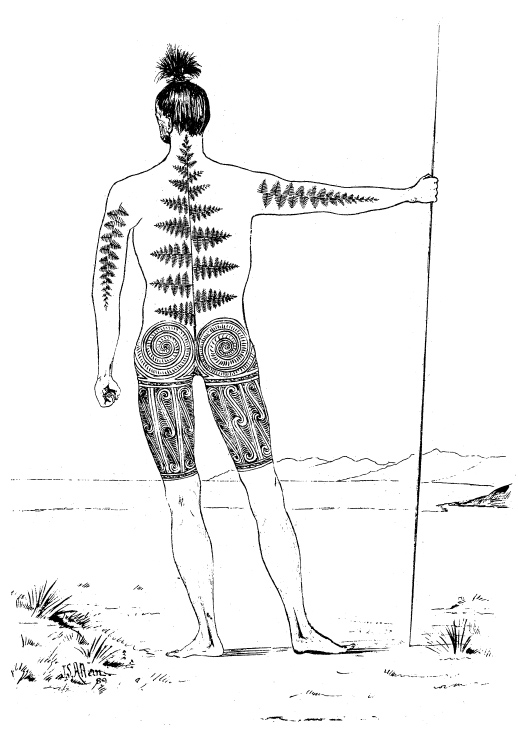
A man holding a tao

Mau rākau is a general term referring to the skilled use of weapons. It is said that the use of weapons was taught in the Whare-tū-taua (House or school of war). The term Mau taiaha is used to refer to the use of the taiaha and does not necessarily include other weapons.

Regular schools are held on Mokoia Island in Lake Rotorua to teach the use of the taiaha. Mita Mohi established the Mokoia taiaha wānanga, which had trained more than 11,000 people over more than 30 years, as of 2007, and had reached more than 20,000 people by the time of his death in 2016. One of those is actor Cliff Curtis, who attended a Mau Rakau taiaha programme on Mokoia Island at the age of 10. Curtis was like a son to Mohi, and helped him out whenever he could at programmes in prisons and the community.

Other Māori weapons:

- Mere (weapon)
- Kotiate
- Tewhatewha
- Patu
- Pouwhenua
- Wahaika

== Mythology ==
It is said weapons including the taiaha and patu were handed down by Tāne, god of the forest and Tū, god of war, the two sons of Rangi-nui and Papatūānuku. The Whare-tū-taua (House of war) is a term which covers the basics of educating young toa (warriors) in the arts of war.
