= Pou =

POU or pou may refer to:

== People ==
- Pou (surname), a surname
- Chu Pou (303–350), Chinese general and politician
- Pou Temara (born 1948), New Zealand Māori academic
- Nellie Pou, politician from New Jersey
- Marie-Philip Poulin (nickname), Canadian hockey player

== Codes ==
- Hudson Valley Regional Airport (IATA airport code: POU), an airport in New York, United States
- Poughkeepsie station (Amtrak station code: POU), a rail station in Poughkeepsie, New York, United States
- Southern Poqomam language (former / deprecated ISO 639-3 language code: pou), a dialect spoken in Guatemala

== Architecture ==
- Pou whenua, a type of carved Māori land post
- Pou whakarae, the primary carved post in a pā

== Other uses ==
- Pou (vessel) (Chinese: 瓿), a type of ancient Chinese ritual vessel
- Pou (video game), a 2012 virtual pet video game
- Pou (deity), a Moriori deity
- POU domain, the conserved region in the POU family of proteins
- Point of use (POU) water treatment equipment, also called portable water purification
