= Poux =

Poux is a French surname. Notable people with the surname include:

- Gilles Poux (born 1957), French politician
- Jean-Baptiste Poux (born 1979), French rugby union footballer
- Paul Poux (born 1984), French cyclist

== See also ==
- Pou
