= Pōwhiri =

Māori welcoming ceremony

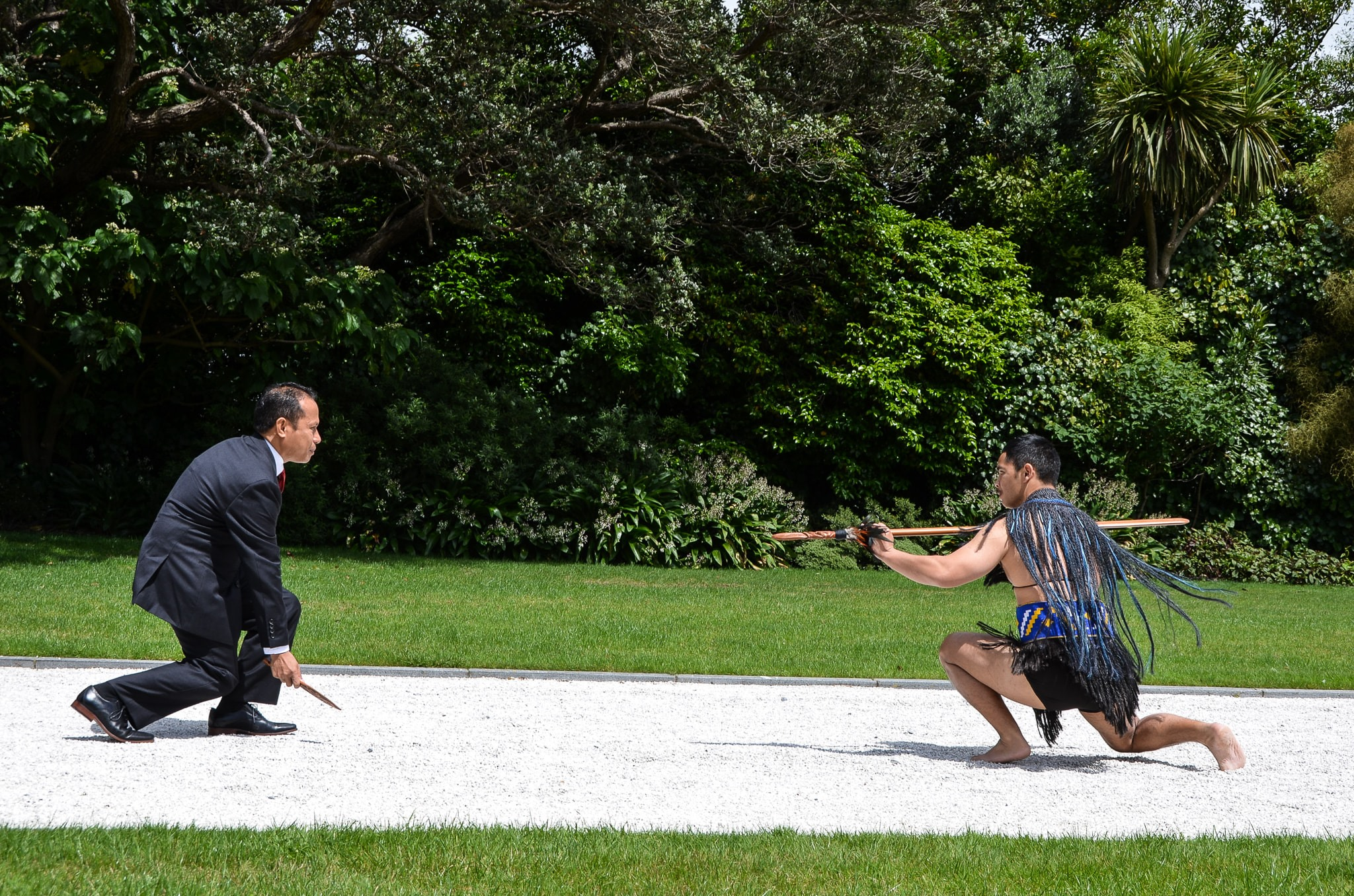
East Timor's ambassador Lisualdo Gaspar (left) accepts the taki during a pōwhiri.

A pōwhiri (/ˈpɔːfɪri/ PAW-fih-ree; Māori pronunciation: [ˈpoːfiɾi]), also known as a pōhiri ([ˈpoːhiɾi]) or pōwiri ([ˈpoːwiɾi]) in some dialects, is a formal Māori welcoming ceremony onto a marae, involving speeches, cultural performance, singing and finally the hongi. The term pōwhiri also refers specifically to an action chant of welcome that is sometimes performed as part of the general pōwhiri.

Traditionally, the pōwhiri was a way by which the tangata whenua ('people of the land') could determine the intentions of manuhiri ('visitors'), so as to avoid conflict. The pōwhiri is a cultural practice deeply rooted in Māori mythology. It serves the purpose of spiritually clearing a path for communication, so that the two groups can meet in a safe and productive way. The details of the kawa ('protocols') of the pōwhiri vary between marae, but the general structure of the ceremony is broadly similar across all iwi ('tribes').

Pōwhiri are still commonly practised to welcome important guests onto a marae. A pōwhiri may not be performed for every group of visitors or in all circumstances; the mihi whakatau (lit. 'settling greeting') is a similar but less formal welcome that may be used instead. A pōwhiri is often used to welcome the tūpāpaku ('body of the deceased') onto a marae before a tangihanga ('funeral'). Pōwhiri are also often performed for tourist groups and as part of special events.

== Process ==
A welcome for Ed Sheeran at Mount Smart Stadium, Auckland, in 2018

While the general form of the pōwhiri is fairly consistent, kawa ('marae protocol') varies between regions, tribal groupings and individual marae. In the Māori language, the visitors to a marae are called manuhiri, while the people of the marae are called tangata whenua ('people of the land'), or hunga kāinga ('home people').

=== Gathering of visitors ===
Before the pōwhiri begins, the visitors gather outside the marae entrance. Entrances vary widely; at some marae there may be a pou ('standing post') or a carved ornamental gate, at others there may simply be a marker stone, or even nothing at all. Some marae feature a small waiting building or shelter that sometimes includes seating, and they may even have toilets for the convenience of the waiting guests.

While gathering it is usual for the visitors to greet each other, and discuss who will perform the various roles during the pōwhiri. If a koha ('gift to the hosts') has not been organised previously, contributions may be collected at this time. The koha is usually handed to the person who will be the last speaker for the visitors. When the hosts are ready for the pōwhiri, one of them may approach the visitors to let them know. When the visitors are ready, they gather together at the entrance to the marae, where the hosts can see them.

=== Wero ===
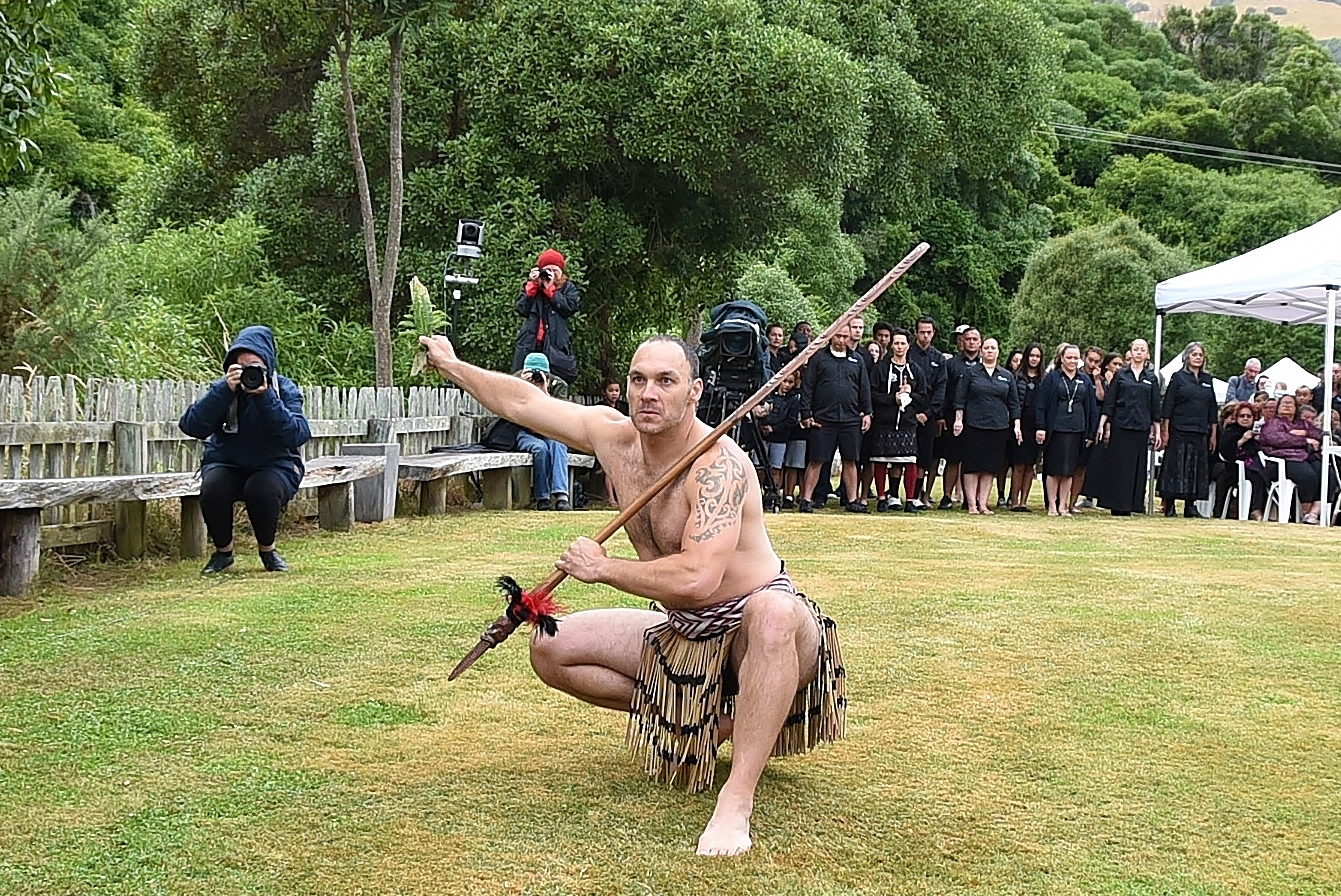
A warrior lays down the wero for the Governor-General during Waitangi Day commemorations at Ōnuku in 2019.

The wero today is a ceremonial challenge made at very formal pōwhiri, usually just for very important dignitaries, including foreign leaders or officials. The literal meaning of wero is 'to throw a spear', though no spear is thrown in the ceremony. The original purpose of the wero was for the people of the marae to find out whether the visitors were coming with peaceful or hostile intentions. Warriors were dispatched to meet the approaching outsiders, and test whether they came in peace.

In the wero, male ceremonial warriors of the marae make a ritual challenge to the visitors. The warriors may perform a haka ('posture dance'), and carry weapons such as taiaha (fighting staffs). A warrior of the marae will come forward, and place on the ground a taki ('token'). The taki usually takes the form of a small branch with leaves, or in some places a carved ceremonial dart. The position of the taki can be significant, as an indicator of whether the visitors can expect a warm welcome or not.

In highly formal settings, there may be three warriors who come forward to issue the wero, one after another. The first challenge is called the rākau whakaara ('warning baton'), the second is the rākau takoto ('baton laid down'), and the third is the rākau whakawaha ('baton that clears the way'). In each case, once the taki has been placed, the warrior retreats some short distance to observe the visitors. Once placed, one of the most honoured male members of visitors approaches, and picks up the taki. Once the final taki has been picked up, the warrior will turn their back to the visitors, hold their taiaha above their head with the point toward the marae, and begin to lead the procession of the visitors onto the marae.

=== Karanga and pōwhiri action chant ===
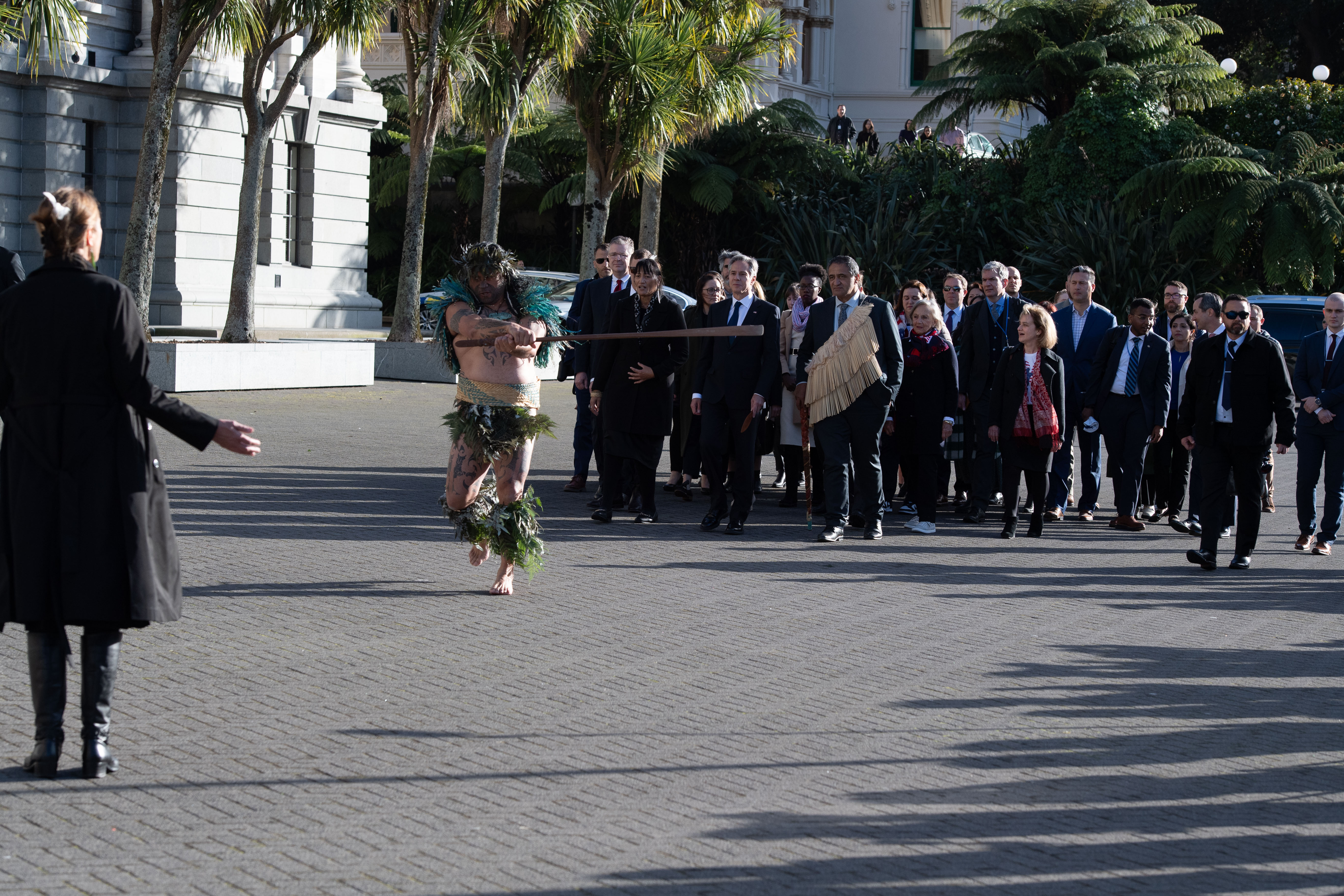
Kaikaranga often dress in black as a sign of mourning for the dead.

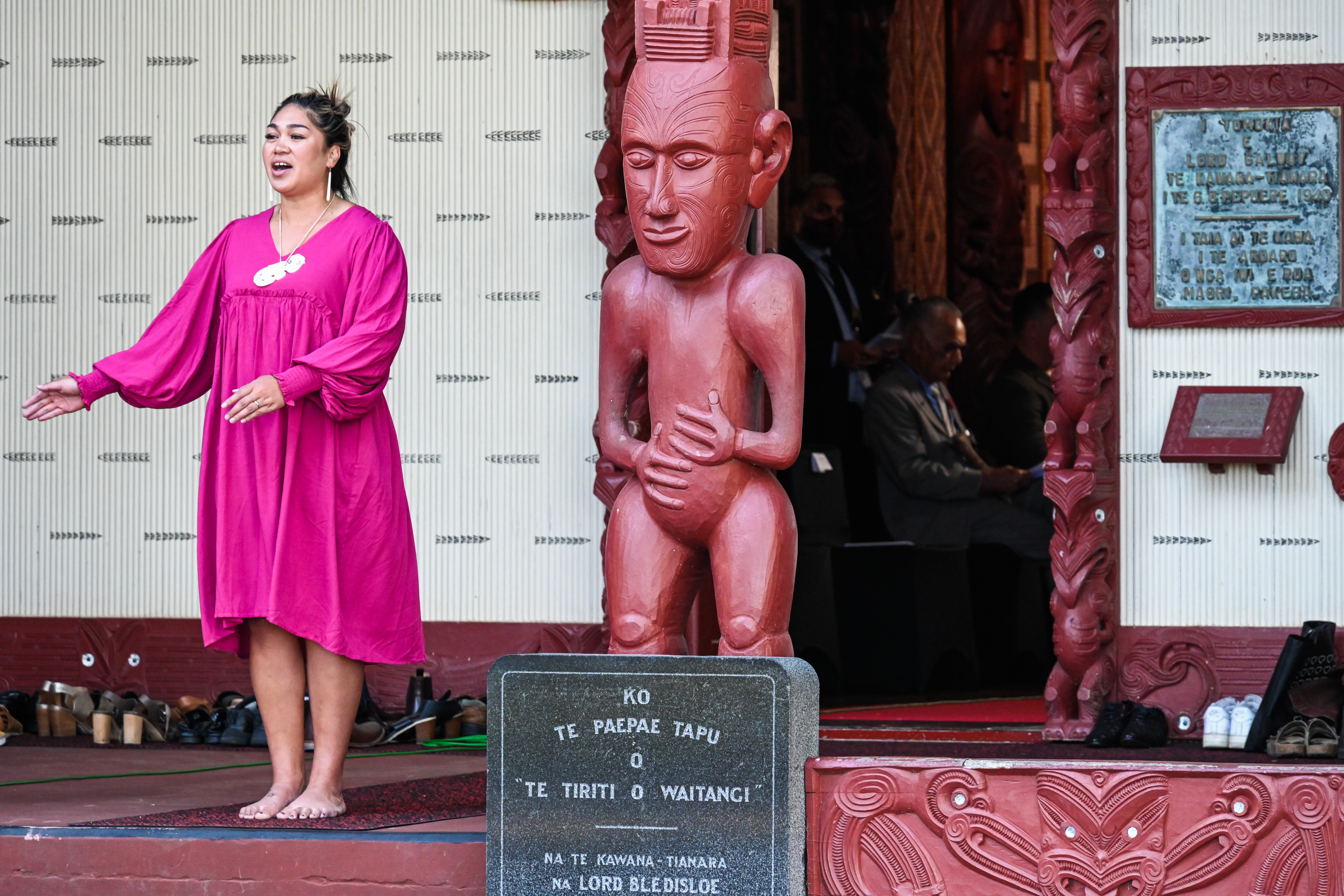
Kaikaranga do not always wear black.

Except when there is a wero, the pōwhiri begins when a woman from the hosts starts a karanga ('call'), which is a long, high-pitched wailing chant that ends in a fading, falling pitch. The beginning of the karanga signals to the visitors that they should begin walking onto the marae ātea ('open courtyard in front of the meeting house'). The order in which the visitors form up depends on the kawa of the marae. In some areas men go first, in other areas women lead. Sometimes three or four kaikaranga ('callers') may call the visitors.

The words of a karanga follow a pattern, but they are not set, and the caller varies them according to the purpose of the gathering, and the identity of the visitors in the party being welcomed. The karanga will usually welcome the visitors and invoke the dead. It may refer by name to the visitors' tribe or hapū, their ancestors, and their significant landmarks, such as rivers and mountains. It will typically invite the visitors to bring the spirits of their dead to be mourned. Kaikaranga often wear black as a sign of mourning.

The karanga is considered sacred. It is the first words that pass between the people of the marae and the visitors. The karanga conveys the mana of the marae and the caller is aware of her responsibility. Kaikaranga are typically women who are at least 60 years old and are recognised callers at the marae. Young women do not karanga unless there is no older woman to do it. Younger women often do not karanga while their mother, grandmother or elder sister is still alive, unless the elder relative has relinquished to them their own right to karanga. While women are often not permitted to give a whaikōrero ('formal speech') on the marae ātea, it is women who do the karanga, and if a woman with mana is not present (or willing) to call, the pōwhiri should not proceed and men will not be doing any whaikōrero.

One or more callers from the visitors—called kaiwhakautu ('repliers')—walk near the front of the procession of guests and call in reply to the tangata whenua. If the hosts are aware, before the karanga start, that a group of visitors do not have a woman who can call, they may send one of their own to the marae entrance to join them and call for them. Alternatively, the guests may enter without calling in response. Ideally when one karanga begins to fade, another should begin, so that karanga alternate back and forth between the two sides as the guests enter the marae. In practice, sometimes the karanga overlap, so that one may be midway through while another is still finishing and a third one is starting. The karanga from the visitors may acknowledge the meeting house, farewell the dead, indicate where the group is from and who is in the group, and refer to their reason for coming or the purpose of the gathering.

Sometimes an elder among the visitors chants a poroporoaki ('farewell') as he enters the marae and the women are calling. This is most common at a tangihanga, where the poroporoaki is directed at the dead person, but it can also be performed on other occasions.

An action chant of welcome called a pōwhiri, or sometimes haka pōwhiri, is performed by the host people on some occasions, usually for distinguished visitors or for the arrival of the body of a deceased person for their tangihanga. It may start before or during the karanga and at some point the two will be occurring simultaneously. Women predominate in the pōwhiri, and men join in behind them. The performers move their hands in unison, lowering them to touch their thighs and then raising them to just above their heads. The women often hold fronds of green leaves in each hand, especially to welcome a deceased person. They shake the fronds continuously, especially when they are raised. The words of a pōwhiri often refer symbolically to the hauling ashore of the visitors' waka ('canoe').

The visitors walk to the centre of the marae ātea then pause for a while to remember the dead. Once they have stood for long enough, the hosts may indicate through spoken words or a final karanga that the guests should come closer and take their place on the seats provided for them.

=== Whaikōrero and waiata ===
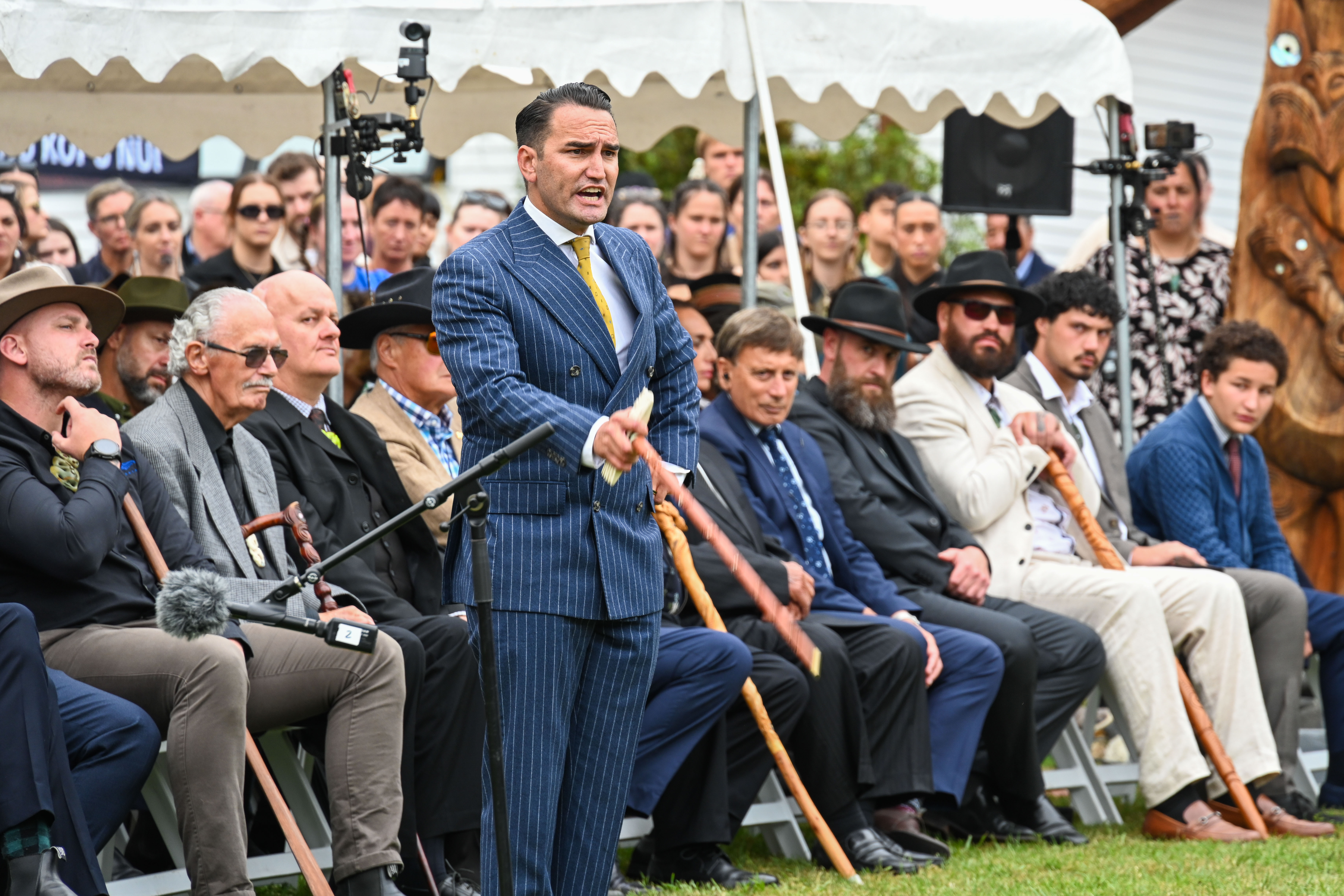
Jymal Morgan delivers the whaikōrero on behalf of Ngāi Tahu during Waitangi Day commemorations at Ōnuku marae in 2025. Other speakers sit behind him on the paepae ('speaker's bench').

The whaikōrero is the formal speech-making of the hui ('meeting'). The whaikōrero may take place inside the wharenui ('meeting house'), or outside on the marae ātea. If held indoors, the visitors stop to remove their shoes before entering the wharenui. Seating is usually arranged such that the guests and the hosts are facing one another. It is important that both groups be seated at the same level, such that speakers face one-another eye-to-eye. In most cases, women sit behind the men, and speakers sit at the front. The paepae is the bench on which the host speakers sit, and can also refer to the covered seating at the threshold of the meeting house.

The speakers of the whaikōrero are called kaikōrero, and the role is typically an honour afforded to people with particularly high mana ('standing'). The hosts can refuse an individual the right to speak, though this is rare. In the kawa of many marae, whaikōrero may only be given in the Māori language. During a typical whaikōrero, the speaker may greet the wharenui, the marae, the land on which they stand, nearby mountains and rivers, the people to whom they are speaking, and the spirits of the dead. Once the mihi ('greetings') are completed, the purpose of the meeting will be addressed. After each speech, a waiata ('song') is usually sung to support the speaker.

The final guest speaker will end their speech by placing the koha ('gift') on the ground before the hosts. This will be picked up and accepted by the final host speaker, who always speaks after the guests. Spiritually, this is an important part of the process, as it ensures that the mauri ('life force') of the marae returns to hosts, and does not leave with the visitors when they leave. A final karanga may be performed before the koha is picked up, to welcome the gift. Protocols around the picking up of the koha vary between marae.

Whaikōrero is an art, as well as something of a competition, in which each side attempts to one-up the other with the quality of their oratory and message. Speakers may gesture with tokotoko ('walking sticks'), or weapons such as toki ('adzes') and taiaha. Silently walking up and down, as well as performative ducking and turning, may be used to add emphasis to parts of the speech. Even today, the whaikōrero can be a quite robust debate on contentious topics. For example, during the pōwhiri for Te Matatini in 2023, leaders from Tainui and Ngāti Whātua Ōrākei debated who had the right to be called mana whenua ('those with authority over the land') in Tāmaki Makaurau (Auckland).

The kawa for speech-making varies between regions and iwi. There are two main types. Under the pāeke style (also sometimes called pā harakeke or taiāwhio), the hosts give all of their speeches one after the other, before inviting the guests to make their speeches. Once the guest speakers are finished, a speaker from the hosts will speak last. Under the tū mai, tū atu (lit. 'I stand, you stand') style (also sometimes called tau utuutu, tau hokohoko, or whakawhiti), the hosts and guests alternate speeches, beginning and ending with a speaker from the hosts. Depending on the number of speakers, the hosts may yield the mauri ('life force') of the marae to the guests to balance the speeches.

=== Hongi ===
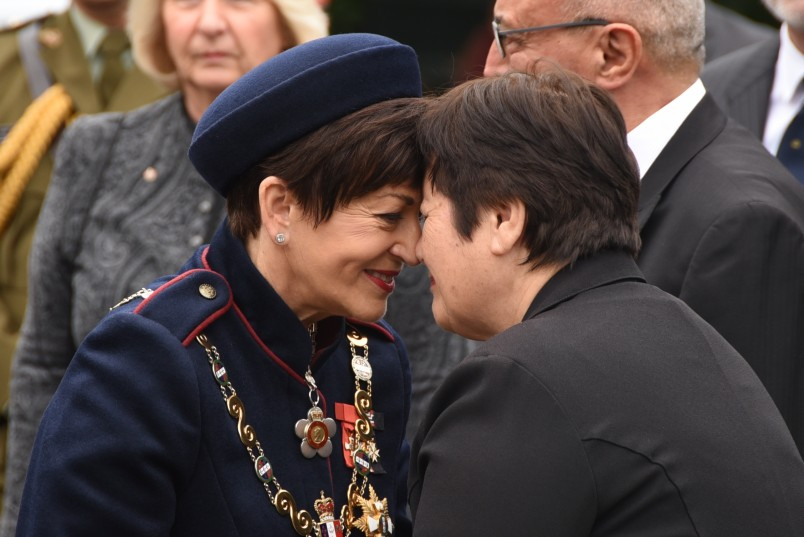
Governor-General Dame Patsy Reddy exchanges a hongi with kuia Hiria Hape during a pōwhiri at her swearing-in ceremony.

The final part of the pōwhiri process is the hongi. This is where a physical connection is made between the visitors and hosts. In this process, the visitors will cross to the and file past the hosts, shaking hands (harirū) and pressing noses or foreheads together. The gesture of hongi represents several things; to some it represents the sharing of the breath of life, to others it represents sharing of thoughts.

The spiritual importance of the hongi is that it connects the two groups physically. This completes the process of the pōwhiri, by lifting the state of tapu ('sacredness') that was created when the karanga began. By physically touching the hosts, the guests become noa ('common, or normal'), essentially joining to become members of the tangata whenua for the duration of the visit. In recent years—particularly after the COVID-19 pandemic—some marae have adjusted their tikanga ('protocol') to require only handshakes, fistbumps or elbow touches for the hongi.

Once the tapu has been lifted, the guests are free to move around the marae. From then on, they are no longer waewae tapu ('first-time visitors'), and are accorded many of the same privileges accorded to tangata whenua for the duration of their stay. In future, they may now be permitted to enter the marae without a pōwhiri. Once the pōwhiri is completed, the way is clear for more general business of the hui to be discussed. This is known as the whakawhiti kōrero ('discussion') and may be conducted in English or Māori, depending on the nature of the business.

=== Meal ===
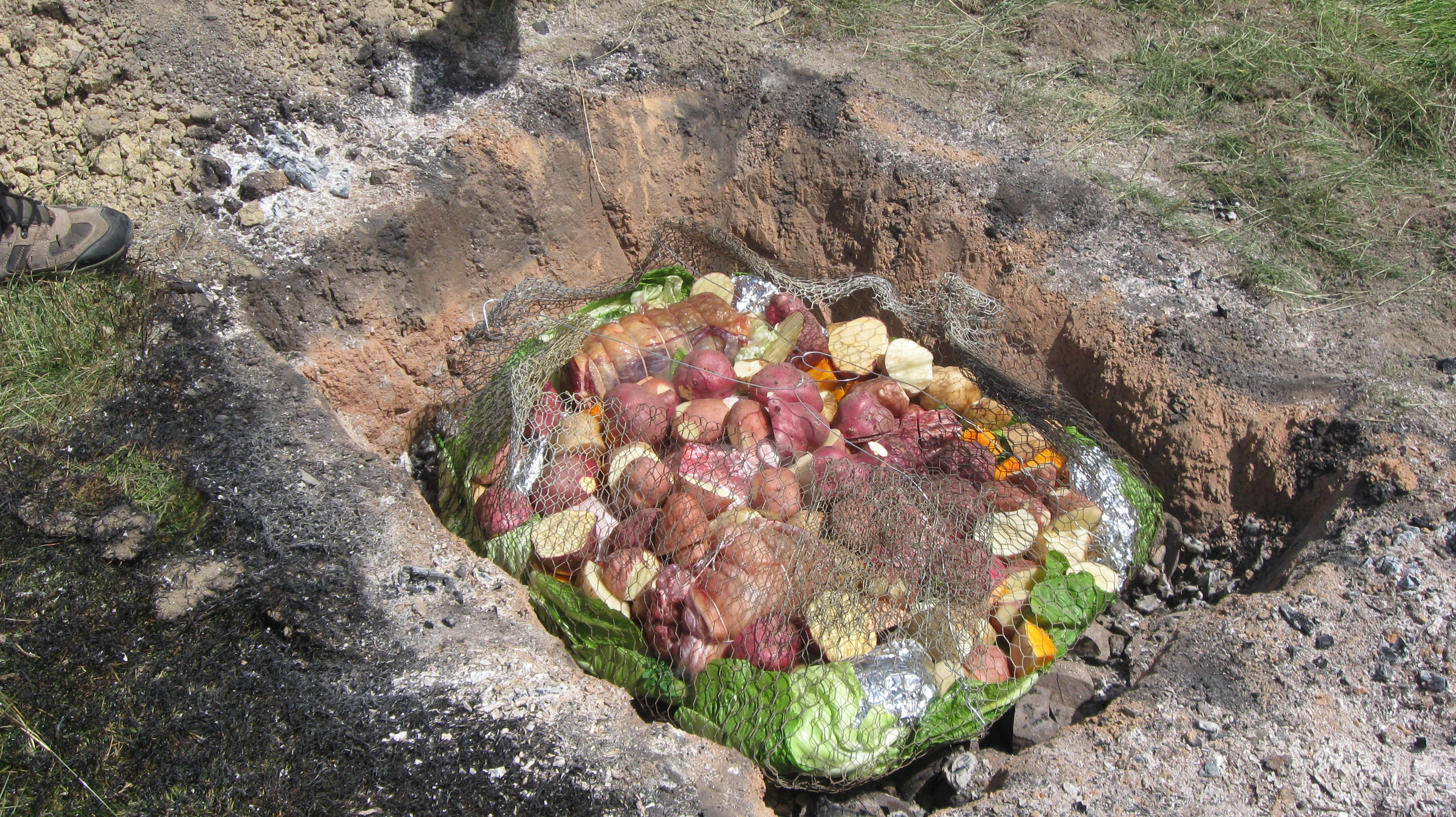
The meal that follows a pōwhiri may include food cooked in a hāngī.

After the formal procedure of the pōwhiri is completed, the visitors will usually be called to the whare kai ('dining hall') to share a meal. It may be a substantial hākari ('feast') involving hāngī, or a modest morning tea. As well as providing hospitality to the visitors, the sharing of food lifts the tapu of the pōwhiri, returning participants to a state of noa and to ordinary life.

== Spiritual significance ==
Spiritually, the pōwhiri represents the coming-together of two different groups of people. The formal proceeding has the purpose of clearing a pathway for a constructive and safe discussion, without the risk of spiritual impediments.

The process of the pōwhiri is rooted in Māori mythology. Various atua are associated with parts of the pōwhiri and the marae. For example, Tūmatauenga, the god of war, is associated with the challenge of the wero. The marae ātea is sometimes referred to as the Te-Tūmatauenga-o-Tu-te-ihiihi (the standing place of the god of war). Contentious kōrero, as far as including insults, may be considered permissible on the marae ātea for this reason. The wharenui of the marae is considered the domain of Rongomātāne, the god of peace, and therefore the language used within the building is usually expected to be more polite and conciliatory. This separation of war and peace is similarly the reason for the removal of shoes when entering the wharenui; this is to prevent dust from the house of war entering the house of peace.

== Mihi whakatau ==
A mihi whakatau is a less formal welcoming ceremony. The process of a mihi whakatau may include many aspects of a pōwhiri, but the protocol is somewhat relaxed.

A key difference between a pōwhiri and mihi whakatau is usually (but not always) the absence of the karanga calling the visitors into the meeting place. For some iwi, a true karanga can only take place on an ancestral marae, and so would be inappropriate to perform elsewhere. If a mihi whakatau involves a karanga, it may be modified to a more generic call of welcome that does not invoke the spirits of the dead; this can enable younger women or even young girls to issue it. By modifying or omitting the karanga, the spiritual tapu ('need for respect') of the meeting is not established, and therefore other protocols can be relaxed. This can enable the speeches to be made in English, or by a woman, or for the welcome to take place somewhere other than a marae, such as a convention centre or a school hall. For this reason, a mihi whakatau may be a way to safely incorporate elements of Māori culture into a non-Māori context, without devaluing the traditional importance of a pōwhiri, or engaging in tokenism.

The mihi whakatau serves the same purpose as the full pōwhiri; it establishes the whanaungatanga ('relationship of shared experience') between two groups. Mihi whakatau may be conducted to begin conferences, or to welcome new students to a school.

== Role in tangihanga ==
Pōwhiri are a common feature of tangihanga ('funerals'). During a tangihanga, the tūpāpaku ('body of the deceased') is transported to the marae. In Māori culture, death is a highly tapu subject; therefore it is important that a pōwhiri is performed to welcome the deceased onto the marae. The karanga calls the spirits of other dead ancestors to the marae, so that the spirit of the recently dead may join them.

== Role of women ==
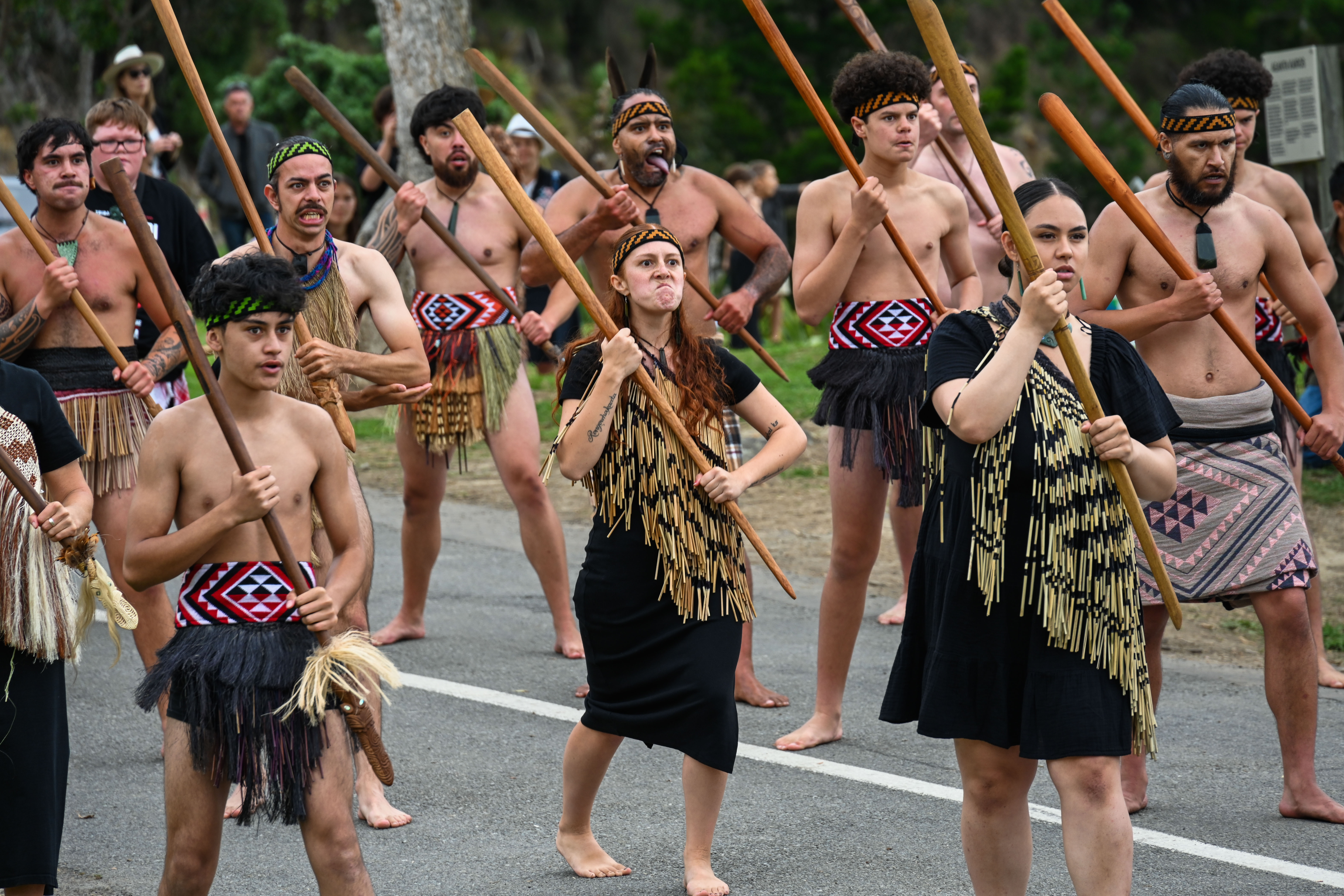
The role of women in the pōwhiri is changing.

Historically in many iwi, women have not had the right to speak during the whaikōrero, or to accept the taki during the wero, and are expected to sit behind the men during the whaikōrero. These aspects of kawa are still in practice in many places today. Some iwi, such as Ngāti Porou, do accept the right of women to stand and whaikōrero, though, as it is for men, this right is only afforded to women with sufficient mana. Women are typically permitted to speak during the general discussions that occur after the formal pōwhiri has completed; the prohibition does not usually extend to general conversation outside the formality of the pōwhiri.

The prohibition on women speaking has been a point of controversy in modern times. At Waitangi Day in 2021, Judith Collins—at the time, leader of the New Zealand National Party—complained that she was not permitted to speak during the formal welcome onto the Waitangi Treaty Grounds, describing the tradition as "sexist". This comment came in spite of the prime minister Jacinda Ardern—also a woman—speaking during the same event. Collins has complained about what she perceives as the sexism of the pōwhiri as far back as mid-2000s. In 2006, she and fellow female politicians Anne Tolley and Paula Bennett walked out of a pōwhiri, after being rebuked by a kaumātua for sitting in the front with the men. At the time she said she felt she was being treated as a "second class guest" and that as a member of parliament, her gender should be irrelevant to where she sits. It later transpired that Child, Youth and Family—who were hosting the pōwhiri—in fact had a policy that women were permitted to sit at the front. Prime minister Helen Clark described Collins's behaviour during the pōwhiri as "boorish".

Hiwi Tauroa asserted that to interpret the role of women in the pōwhiri as female suppression, one must evaluate the process solely from a non-Māori perspective. In Māori culture, the tapu and mana of a woman demands that she not be targeted with abusive speech, which can occur as part of the whaikōrero; for this reason they are not permitted to speak, lest they be responded to in an abusive way. He also points to the other critical roles in the pōwhiri that can only be performed by women, particularly the karanga and the waiata. These roles arise from the high tapu placed on women on the marae, which grant them some supremacy over men. Through these roles, women can assert significant control over proceedings. For example, a woman may terminate a speech that she considers to have gone on too long by beginning the closing waiata, or walking in front of the speaker. Similarly, the karanga can only be issued by a woman. Therefore, if a woman is unwilling to welcome the visitors for some reason, the pōwhiri cannot even begin, and the visitors must remain outside. In this way, the karanga embodies the mana wāhine ('power of the women').

Georgina Stewart echoes Tauroa's interpretation of the role of women in the pōwhiri. She argues that the accusation of sexism stems from non-Māori ignorance of Māori culture. The interpretation of Māori culture by non-Māori—and attempts to "box-tick" Māori culture into non-Māori contexts—leads to a misinterpretation of the role of women in the space. Ultimately, she rejects feminist criticism of the pōwhiri as another example of colonisation, the imposition of Western cultural beliefs onto Māori. In a review of Māori reactions to non-Māori claims of sexism, political scientist Katherine Curchin concludes that Māori women overwhelmingly reject such criticism, as they understand it to be an attack from the outside on the Māori worldview. Even Māori women who themselves are internally critical of the restrictions on women in the pōwhiri, often reject the same criticism when it comes from outsiders.

The role of women in the pōwhiri has been gradually changing in modern times, with women taking on more speaking roles in the pōwhiri. Since the 1990s, female dignatories—particularly the Prime Minister—have been increasingly permitted to speak at Waitangi. Some Māori women have strongly criticised the prohibition on women speaking, particularly when the right has been afforded to non-Māori women but not Māori women. Mere Mangu of Ngāpuhi has often stood and given a whaikōrero on the Waitangi Treaty grounds, in direct opposition to the tikanga of the iwi. In 2024, women had speaking roles in the pōwhiri ceremonies that occurred at Waitangi.

In addition to speaking roles, the role of kaiwero ('challenger') has also been opening to women in modern times. Beginning in the 2010s, Ngāti Waewae women were allowed to perform the wero, as a re-assertion of mana wāhine. Records show that in their iwi, women had historically performed the wero, but the practice had ended several generations previously. Te Amo Tamainu—a young woman with experience in mau rākau—was selected to be kaiwero in 2015, when Minister for Treaty Negotiations Chris Finlayson made an apology to iwi on behalf of the Crown at Arahura Marae near Hokitika. A video of the event went viral.

== Right-wing criticism ==
During the 2005 general election, Don Brash, the leader of the New Zealand National Party and later the founder of the anti-Māori lobby group Hobson's Pledge, criticised the use of pōwhiri in welcoming foreign visitors, "when the only official welcome they have is a Maori New Zealander jumping around half-naked. [...] I think there is a place for Maori culture but why is it that we always use a semi-naked male, sometimes quite pale-skinned Maori, leaping around in [...] mock battle?"

The right-wing Danish MP Marie Krarup visited New Zealand in March 2013, and wrote that "the screaming, the shouting, the half-naked men", dressed in a "grass skirt", at a pōwhiri to welcome her group to the Royal New Zealand Navy's marae were "grotesque". Colin Craig, the leader of the Conservative Party, sided with her statement by saying no visitors should have to face a "bare-bottomed native making threatening gestures" if they did not want to.

== Historic examples of pōwhiri ==
- When James Cook first landed at Mercury Bay in 1769, local Māori from the Ngāti Hei iwi greeted him and his crew with a pōwhiri at Wharetaewa Pā, near Whitianga, on 12 November.
- In the third chapter of his historical account Old New Zealand, F. E. Maning gives an account of a pre-colonial pōwhiri. The ceremony he describes is quite elaborate, and spread over two days, with the wero ('challenge') happening on the first day, and the whaikōrero ('speeches') happening the following day.
- When the Kotahitanga parliament met at Pāpāwai in the late 1890s, the event was opened with a large pōwhiri to greet the attendees.
- The Matatini kapa haka festival is traditionally opened with a large pōwhiri.
