= Taiaha Peak =

Mountain in New Zealand

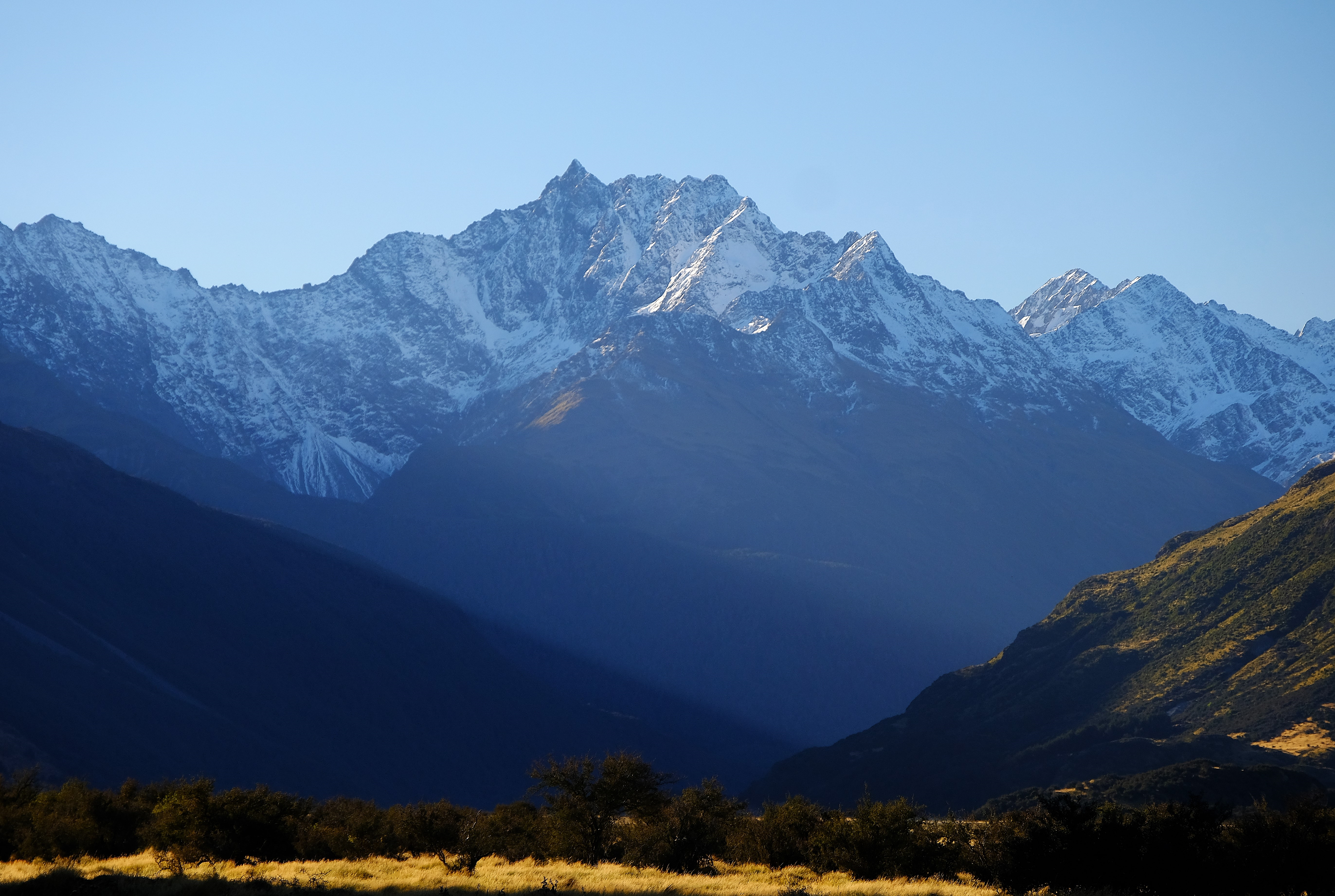
- South aspect

Highest point
- Elevation: 2,241 m (7,352 ft)
- Prominence: 341 m (1,119 ft)
- Isolation: 3.51 km (2.18 mi)
- Coordinates: 43.95635°S 169.78665°E

Naming
- Etymology: Taiaha

Geography
- Location within New Zealand
- Interactive map of Taiaha Peak
- Location: South Island
- Country: New Zealand
- Region: Canterbury
- Parent range: Southern Alps; Elcho–Huxley Mountains
- Topo map: Topo50 BY14

Geology
- Rock age: Permian to Triassic
- Rock type: Semischist of Rakaia Terrane

Climbing
- First ascent: 1939

Taiaha Peak is a 2,241-metre-elevation (7,352-foot) mountain in the Canterbury Region of New Zealand.

== Description ==
Taiaha Peak is located 120 kilometres (75 mi) southwest of Christchurch in the South Island. It is set in the Elcho–Huxley Mountains of the Southern Alps. Precipitation runoff from the mountain's west slope drains into the headwaters of the North Branch of the Huxley River, whereas all other slopes drain into Thar and Paradise creeks which are tributaries of the Hopkins River. Topographic relief is significant as the summit rises 980 metres (3,215 feet) above Paradise Creek in one kilometre, and 1,580 metres (5,184 feet) above the Hopkins Valley in three kilometres. The nearest higher peak is Boanerges, 3.5 kilometres to the south-southwest. The mountain's toponym is from the Māori language: the Taiaha is a traditional weapon of the Māori, and this peak's summit has a prominent spear-like shape.

== Climbing ==
Climbing routes with first ascents:

- North West Face – O. Cantwell, Phil Cook, Frank Newmarch, R. Smith – (April 1939)
- South East Face – Ron Smoothy, Ellen Smoothy, Roger Thomson – (January 1983)
- West Ridge – Rob Battersby, Hamish Dunn – (March 1994)
- Via Paradise Valley – Thomas Evans, Jackson Green – (June 2004)
- I've found Cod – Paul Hersey, Graham Zimmerman – (September 2006)
- East Ridge – Shelly Graham, Graham Zimmerman – (April 2007)

== Climate ==
Based on the Köppen climate classification, Taiaha Peak is located in a marine west coast (Cfb) climate zone, with a subpolar oceanic climate (Cfc) at the summit. Prevailing westerly winds blow moist air from the Tasman Sea onto the mountains, where the air is forced upwards by the mountains (orographic lift), causing moisture to drop in the form of rain or snow. This climate supports a glacieret on the northwest slope of this peak. The months of December through February offer the most favourable weather for viewing or climbing this peak.

== See also ==
- List of mountains of New Zealand by height
