= Philippine Falange =

Philippine section of the Spanish political party Falange

Spanish National Assemblies Juntas Nacionales Españolas
- Leader: Andrés Soriano; Enrique Zóbel de Ayala
- Founded: 1936
- Dissolved: 1945
- Ideology: Falangism
- Political position: Far-right

Party flag

The Philippine Falange, the informal name for the Spanish National Assemblies of the Philippines (Juntas Nacionales Españolas), was a Philippine falangist political party that was a branch of the Spanish Falange. It was founded in 1936. The party was initially led from the late 1930s by Spanish citizen and businessman Andrés Soriano. A leadership struggle occurred between Martín Pou and Enrique Zóbel de Ayala.

The party was effectively dissolved when Soriano was quietly granted Filipino citizenship by the government. It was done to avoid a major political formation within the Philippines which was at least tacitly supportive of the Axis powers, as Franco's Falange and subsequent Spanish Government was. Others followed suit, preventing the threat of their properties being seized by the Allied powers. Other members collaborated with the Japanese during the occupation, excluding Soriano who joined with Manuel Quezon and the government of the Philippine Commonwealth in exile, in the United States, as well as the Spanish Filipinos who formed Commonwealth military and guerrilla forces in Negros in the Philippines.

== See also ==
- Ganap Party
- Kalibapi
- Makapili
