= Pou (surname) =

Pou (Catalan pronunciation: [ˈpɔw, ˈpow]) is a Catalan surname; a topographic name for someone who lived by a well, pou ‘well’ (Latin puteus ‘well’, ‘pit’).

Notable people with the name include:

- The New Orleans physician at the center of the Anna Pou case
- Bartolomé Pou (1727–1802), Spanish writer
- Edward W. Pou (1863–1934), American politician
- Genevieve Pou (1919–2007), American novelist
- Josep Maria Pou (born 1944), Spanish actor
- Julia Pou (born 1947), Uruguayan politician
- Luis Lacalle Pou (born 1973), Uruguayan politician
- Martín Pou, Spanish lawyer
- Miguel Pou (1880–1968), Puerto Rican painter, draftsman and art professor
- Nellie Pou (born 1956), American politician
- Saveros Pou (1929–2020), French linguist
- Pou Sohtireak, 20th and 21st century Cambodian politician
- Terrance John Pou (born 1962), birth name of Mika X, New Zealand Māori singer, performance artist, actor, filmmaker, TV producer and comedian
- Pou Vannary (fl. 1970s), Cambodian singer

== See also ==
- Pou (disambiguation)
- Pou-Pou
