= Hongi =

Traditional Māori greeting

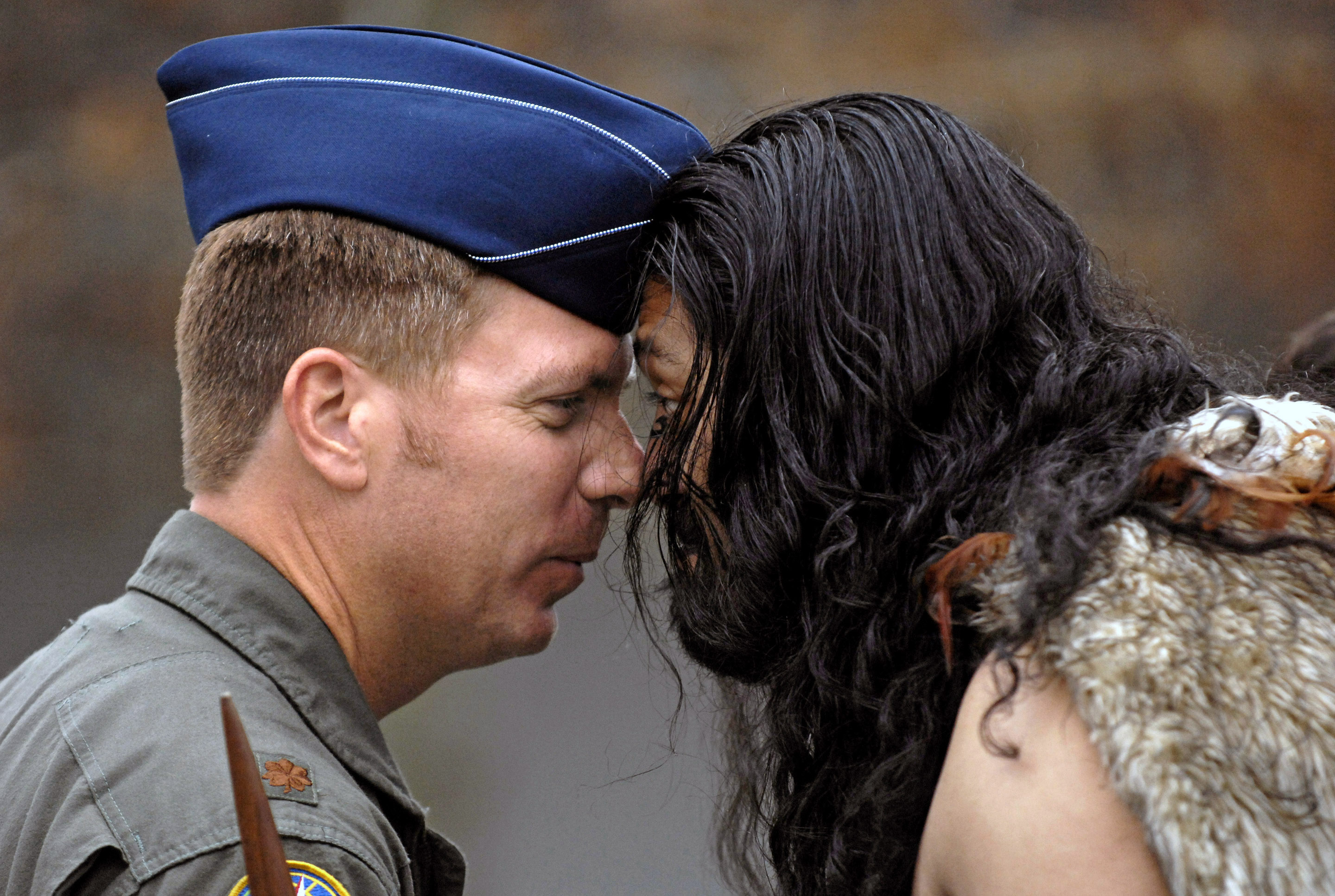
A U.S. airman and a Māori warrior exchange a hongi during a pōwhiri ceremony.

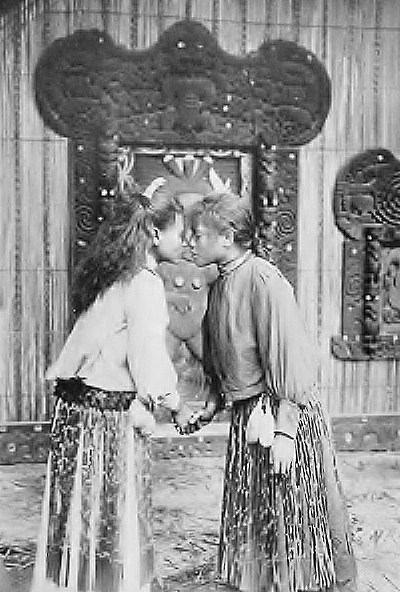
Two Māori women exchange a hongi, 1913.

The hongi (Māori pronunciation: [ˈhɔŋi]) is a traditional Māori greeting performed by two people pressing their noses together, often including the touching of the foreheads. The greeting is used at traditional meetings among Māori people, and at major ceremonies, such as a pōwhiri. It may be followed by a handshake. It is a unisexual gesture, although women may be greeted by the post-colonial practice of a kiss on the cheek. The receiver signals by leaning forward with their eyes closed.

In the hongi, the ha (breath of life) is exchanged in a symbolic show of unity. Through the exchange of this greeting, manuhiri, visitors, blend with tangata whenua, the people of the land, and establish a connection.

A rāhui (temporary ban) was placed on the use of the hongi by some iwi and rūnanga (tribes and tribal councils) because of the COVID-19 pandemic.

== Symbolism ==
When Māori greet one another by pressing noses, the tradition of sharing the breath of life is considered to have come directly from the gods. In Māori mythology, woman was created by the gods moulding her shape out of the earth. The god Tāne embraced the figure and breathed into her nostrils. She then sneezed and came to life, creating the first woman in Māori legends, Hineahuone. Some iwi in the North Island's east coast prefer to press their nose twice, one for inhaling and exhaling each.

== Examples ==
The hongi may be performed by Māori and non-Māori, and between New Zealanders and foreign visitors. Several British royals have been greeted with the hongi during visits to New Zealand, including: Charles III; Diana, Princess of Wales; Queen Camilla; Prince William and Catherine, Princess of Wales; and Prince Harry and Meghan Markle. U.S. Secretary of State Hillary Clinton was greeted with a hongi in November 2010 during her visit to Wellington. Former U.S. President Barack Obama exchanged a hongi during a visit to the country in March 2018. The hongi is used in some churches as a way to share the sign of peace.

== Similar practices ==
In Native Hawaiian culture, the Honi is a practice similar to the Māori Hongi, involving touching noses.

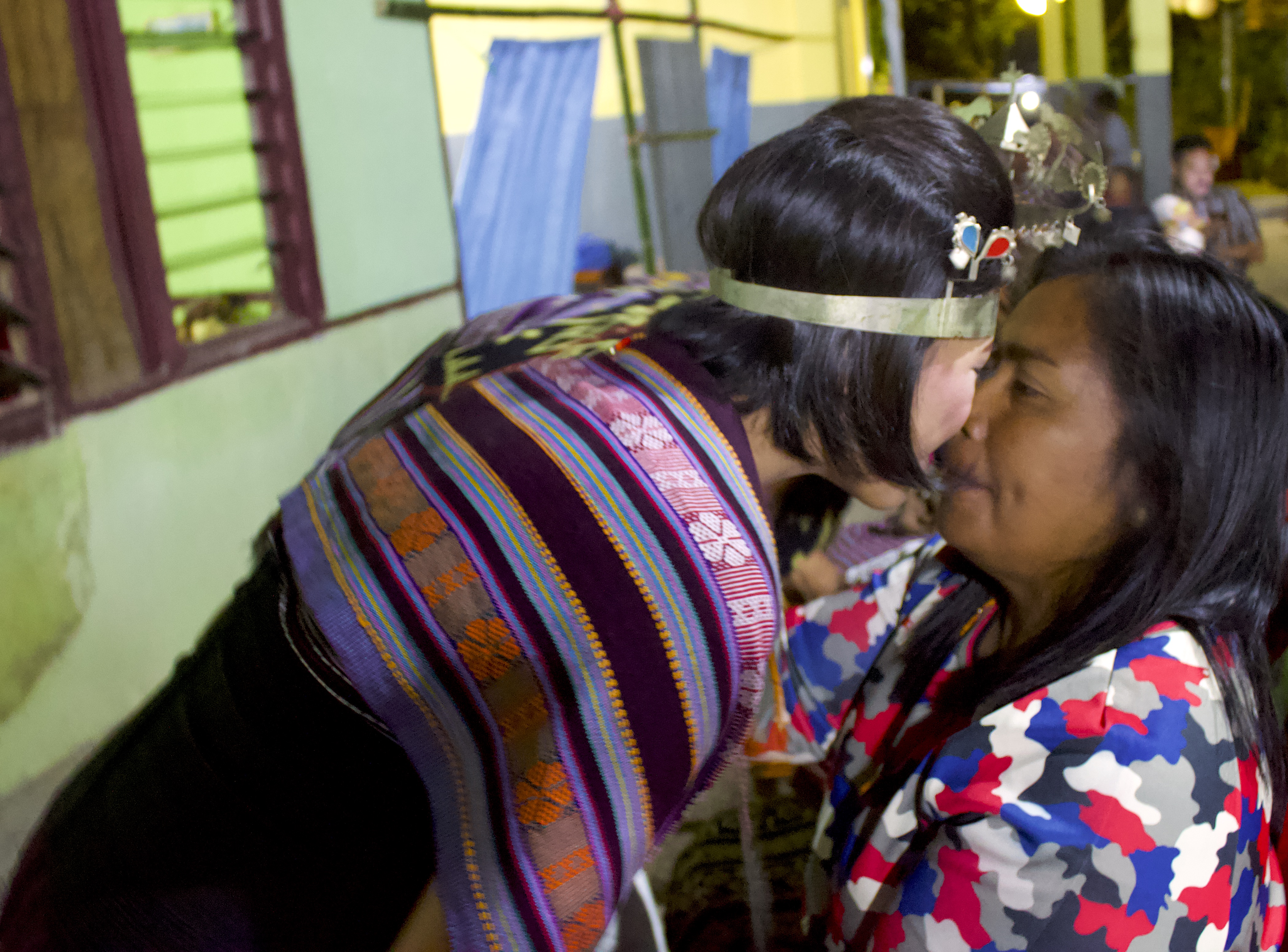
Henge'do during wedding.

In Sabu Raijua, Indonesia, a similar greeting involving touching noses called Henge'do is practiced.

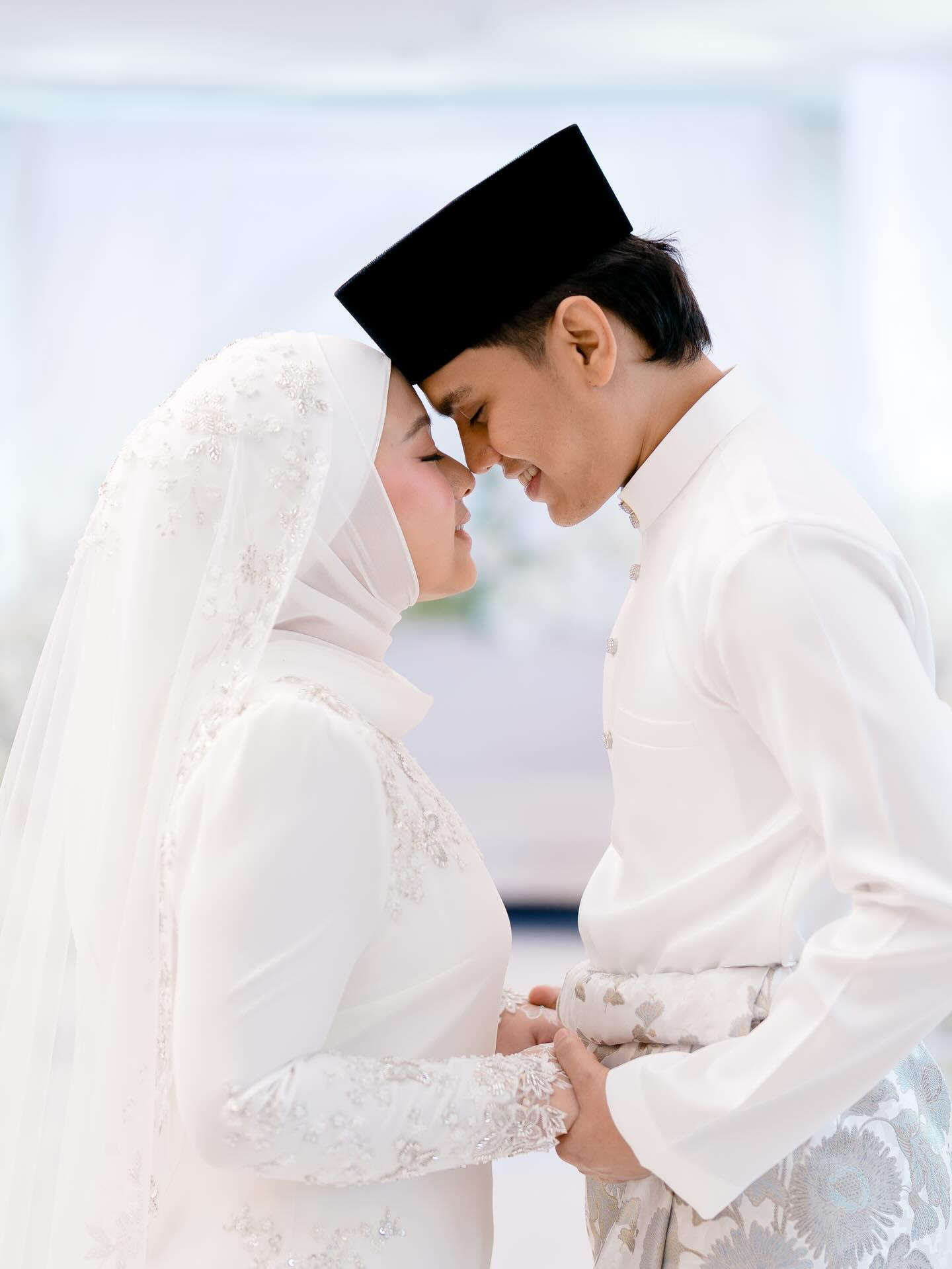
Sentuhan Dahi/mengecupi/bersemuka/Hidung ke hidung during wedding.

In Native Malaysian Culture, the Sentuhan Dahi or mengecupi or bersemuka or Hidung ke hidung culture symbolises greeting, affection reunion, farewell and romance

== See also ==
- Cheek kissing
- Eskimo kissing, a similar gesture
- Māori culture
