= Taiaha =

Close-quarters Māori weapon

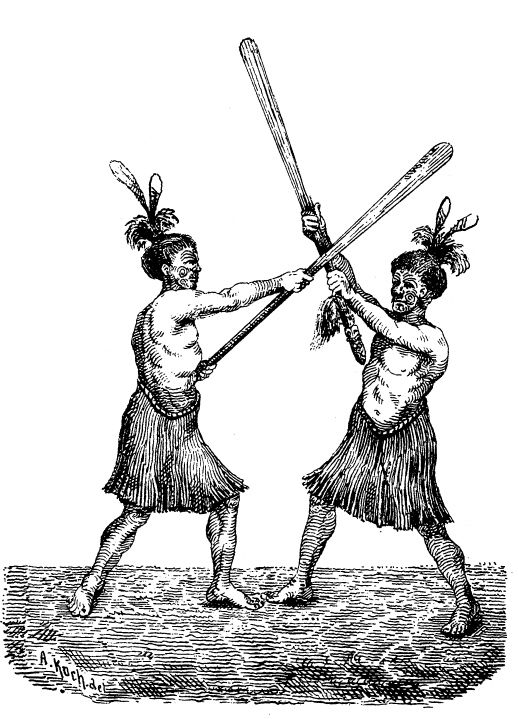
Two Māori men fighting with taiaha

A taiaha (Māori pronunciation: [ˈtaiaha]) is a traditional weapon of the Māori of New Zealand. It is a close-quarters staff weapon made from either wood or whalebone, and used for short, sharp strikes or stabbing thrusts with efficient footwork on the part of the wielder.

Taiaha are usually between 5 and 6 feet (1.5 and 1.8 m) in length. They have three main parts: the upoko (head), with the arero (tongue) protruding from it, used for stabbing the opponent and parrying; the ate (liver) or tinana (body), the long round part that is gripped; and the rau, the long flat blade that is the main striking part.

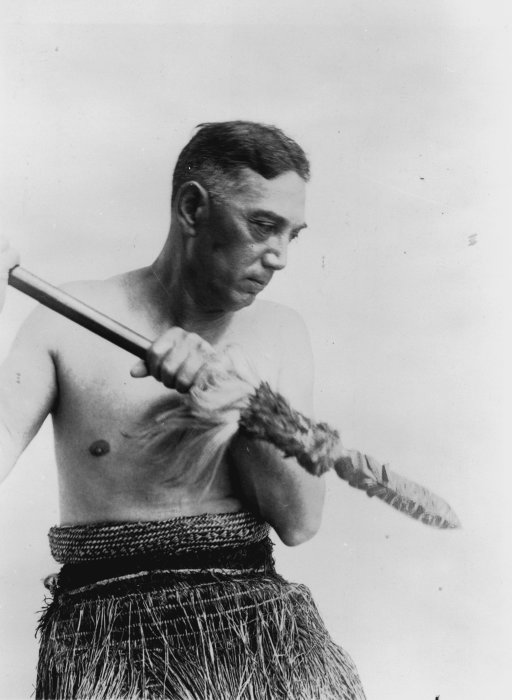
Portrait of Te Rangi Hīroa (Peter Henry Buck) dressed in Maori costume and holding a taiaha, 1930s

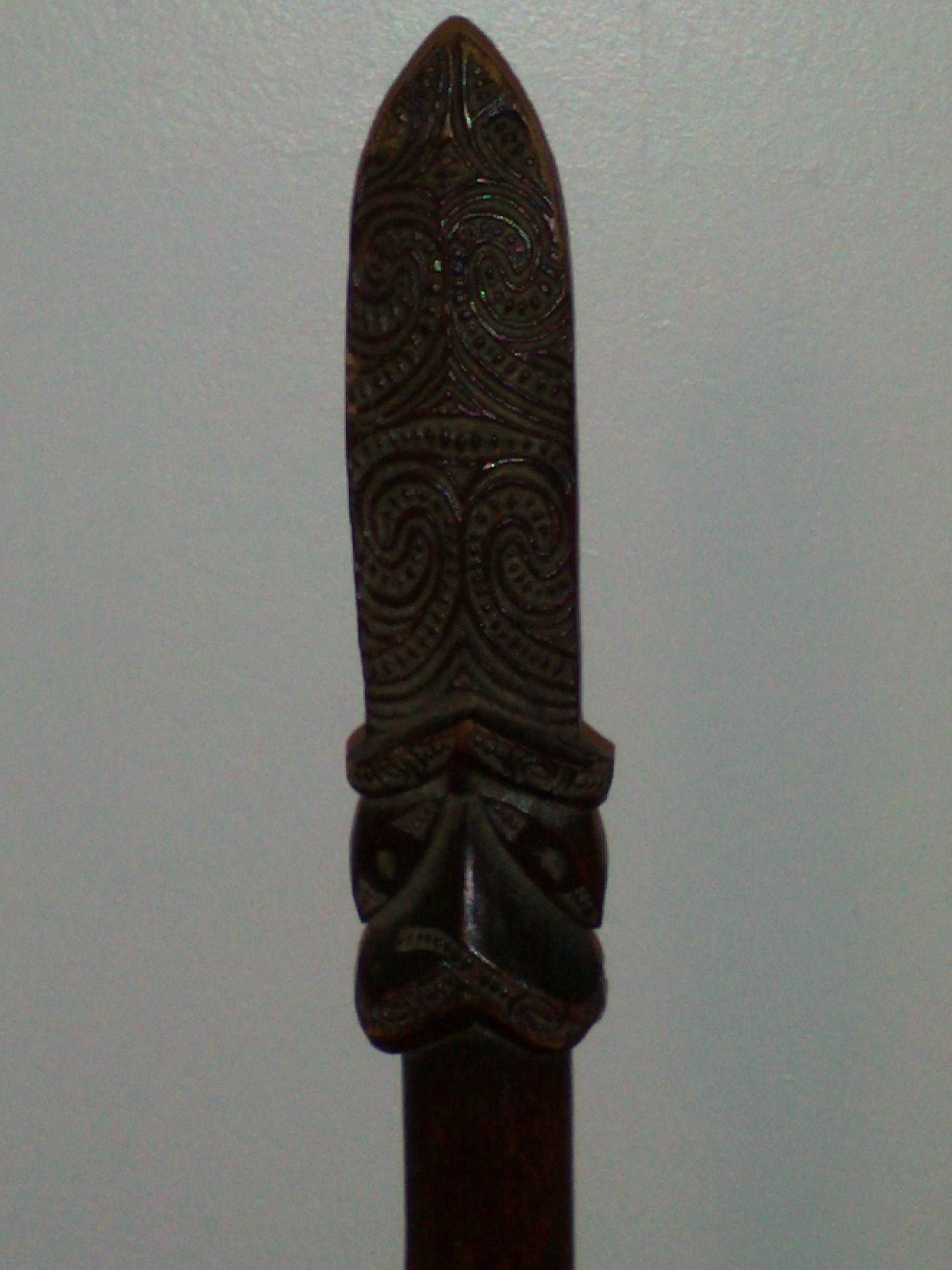
Detail of upoko

== Use ==
Mau rākau is the martial art that teaches the use of the taiaha and other Māori weapons in combat. As with other martial arts styles, students of the taiaha spend years mastering the skills of timing, balance and co-ordination necessary to wield the weapon effectively. The taiaha is widely known due to its use in the wero — the traditional Māori challenge during the pōwhiri, a formal welcoming ceremony. A wero is commonly given to heads of state and visiting dignitaries welcomed to New Zealand.

Individual displays of weaponry expertise were often performed during the wero ceremony (ritual challenge to a party of visitors). In full view of the visiting party, a selected warrior would parry invisible blows and strike down unseen foes. He would then lay down a taki (symbol of peace), which was picked up by the visitors, and the welcoming ceremony would continue. Such weaponry displays still occur today during large and important Māori gatherings. Usually, the wero is performed by a lone warrior, but during special events, there might be as many as three. This unique demonstration of Māori weaponry remains part of modern Māori society.

The taiaha is one of many cultural items which are used to introduce children in school to Māori culture. They are also used in present-day kapa haka competitions, and training with the taiaha is seen as part of the Māori cultural revival.

== History ==
The use of traditional Māori weaponry declined after the Europeans arrived in New Zealand. Weapons such as the taiaha were replaced by the Europeans' muskets and para whakawai, or traditional Māori weaponry training schools, disappeared altogether. As a result, the traditional weaponry knowledge was lost among many Maori tribes. Some tribes managed to maintain their distinctive traditions by passing down traditional knowledge secretly between a few chosen individuals.

During the Māori cultural renaissance in the 1980s, there has been a renewed interest and cultivation of traditional weapons. Although there is a much narrower range of traditional weapons being revived, the Māori weaponry has expanded to become a significant trademark of Māori culture. This revival has been part of the larger Māori cultural renaissance that began in the late 1960s. The survival of Māori weaponry was only possible with the work and activism of remaining experts like Irirangi Tiakiawa, Pita Sharples, John Rangihau, Matiu Mareikura and Mita Mohi.

=== Modern para whakawai ===
In a modern context, Māori weaponry is severely limited to just a few types, with the taiaha being one of the most popular. Likewise, only a small number of para whakawai are in operation—most are taught within a tribal framework. Much of the knowledge within today's para whakawai is presented with a background of a deeper tribal history, offering a strong sense of identity, kinship and belonging.

The para whakawai on Mokoia Island in Lake Rotorua trains members of Te Arawa and other interested individuals in weaponry ideologies, theories and beliefs. This programme was established under the guidance of Mita Mohi in the mid-1980s. This programme was extended to the Christchurch area in the 90s being delivered by Temairiki Williams and the group Te Tohu O Tu.

The para whakawai Te Whare Tū Taua o Aotearoa began at Hoani Waititi Marae in Auckland and grew to include a number of outreach programmes in different regions. It was established by Pita Sharples in the 1980s ‘to offer the ancient art of mau rakau back to Maoridom as an innovative programme’.

== Weapons training ==
Warfare and weaponry were essential to the traditionally militant Māori society. Children were prepared for warfare from an early age. Their early training included playing activities like boxing, wrestling and stick-throwing games.

In the para whakawai, the young men learned mau rākau (the use of weapons). They were instructed in battle formations, weapon use, and attack and defense maneuvers. They would often participate in mock battles using reeds instead of the real weapons. Rakanga waewae (skilful footwork) was vital to fighting and using weapons. Using weapons, especially the taiaha, takes "a lot of maneuvering. It is dangerous. It requires hours, days, months and years of constant use to master it."

=== Weapons ===
To Māori, weapons were more than just implements of warfare — they were taonga (treasures), and handed down as precious heirlooms from generation to generation. Weapons were made of wood, stone and bone in a slow, painstaking process. Traditionally, a long weapon from hardwood could take months to shape and decorate; a stone patu would take over a year to complete. Though it took time to fashion weapons, the level of dedication and pride in creating these objects made them valuable. Karakia (incantations) were sometimes said over weapons to imbue them with deities and make them tapu (sacred).

== Popular culture ==
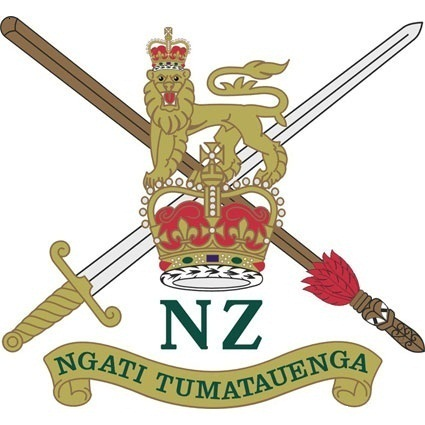
Crest of the New Zealand Army, with the second sword swapped for a taiaha in Charles Bennett's honour

- The coat of arms of New Zealand depicts a Māori warrior with a taiaha as one of the supporters.
- The New Zealand Army includes an image of a taiaha in its official badge since 1998.
- The squadron badge of No. 3 Squadron Royal New Zealand Air Force is a Maori Warrior wielding a Taiaha.
- The unit badge of the RNZAF Police depicts a griffin holding a Taiaha.
- The taiaha was featured in the award-winning 2002 film, Whale Rider and more briefly in the film Once Were Warriors.
- In the TV series, Deadliest Warrior, the taiaha is one of the Māori warrior's weapons in a contest with a Shaolin monk.
- The taiaha was also featured in two video games for the PlayStation 2, The Mark of Kri and its sequel Rise of the Kasai as a weapon for the games' hero, Rau. In The Mark of Kri, the taiaha is plunged into the ground but, in Māori culture, this is an offense as the taiaha itself is seen as a guardian ancestor related to the war god Tūmatauenga, father of the first man.
- The character Haka from the card game Sentinels of the Multiverse wields a taiaha as a weapon.
- Taiaha Peak in the Southern Alps is named after the taiaha.

== See also ==
Other Māori weapons:

- Kotiate
- Mere
- Patu
- Pouwhenua
- Tewhatewha
- Wahaika
