= Wahaika =

Māori hand weapon

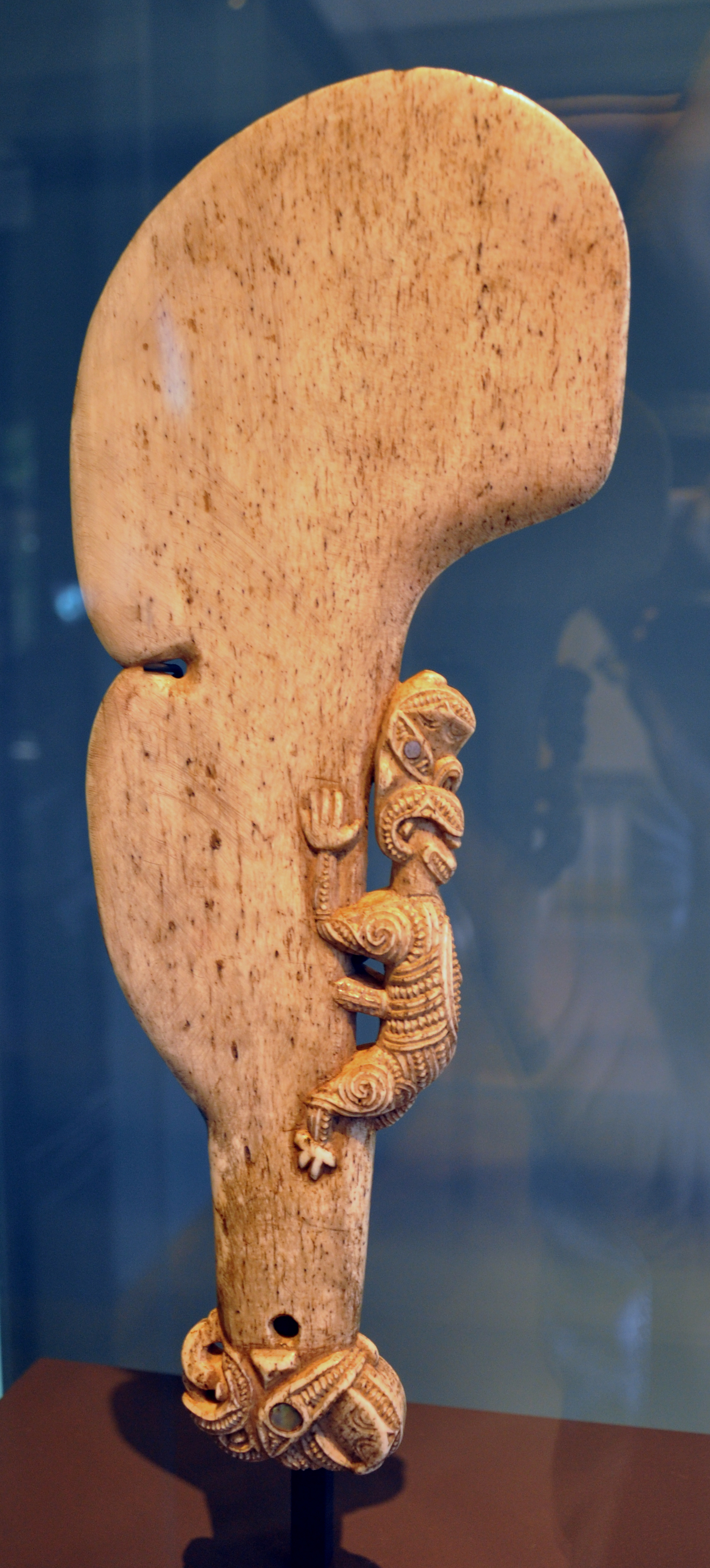
Wahaika, circa 1900. Rietberg Museum.

A wahaika is a type of traditional Māori hand weapon. Wahaika are short club-like weapons usually made of wood or whalebone and are used for thrusting and striking in close-quarter, hand-to-hand fighting. Whalebone wahaika are called wahaika parāoa.

Wahaika translates to "mouth of the fish", in reference to the notch on one side which is used to catch an opponent's weapon. On the other side just above the handle the concave tip above a carved humanoid figure is the primary striking edge, particularly used against the opponent's temples, face, and ribs. The rest of the spherical edge is sharp like a blade.

Wooden wahaika are often carved with intricate designs. In addition to being a fighting weapon, rangatira would hold wahaika during ceremonies and speeches, especially if they wanted people to pay attention to something important. Special wahaika would only be given to people with considerable ranking in the Māori tribal structure.

The resemblance of the wahaika to the Chilean Mapuche people's clava hand club has been cited as "soft evidence" for Pre-Columbian Polynesia-South America contact.

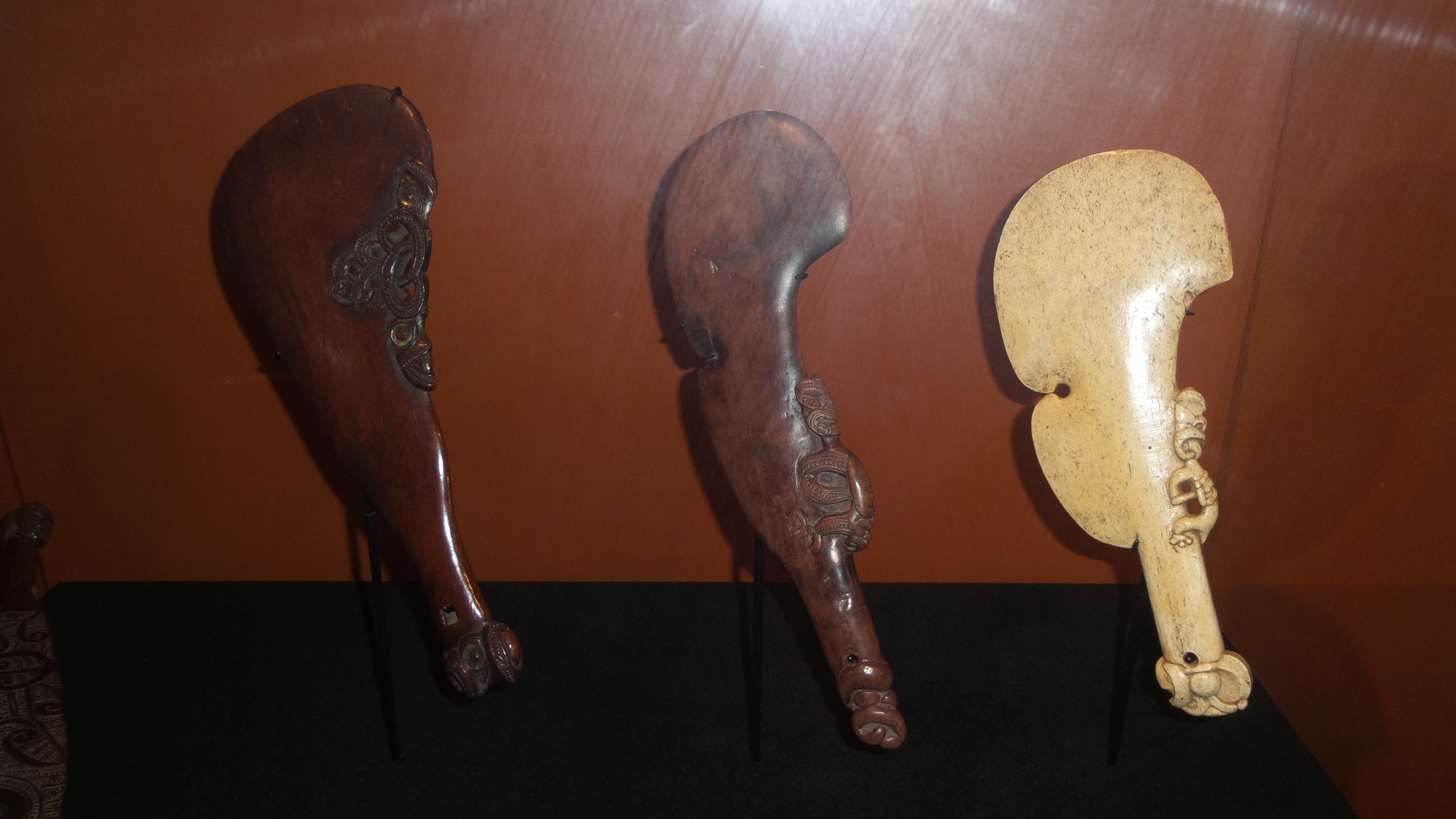
Two wooden and one whalebone wahaika in Te Papa Museum

== See also ==
- Mere (weapon)
- Pouwhenua
- Tewhatewha
- Patu
- Taiaha
- Kotiate
