= Pou whakarae =

Main post in the palisade of a Māori pā

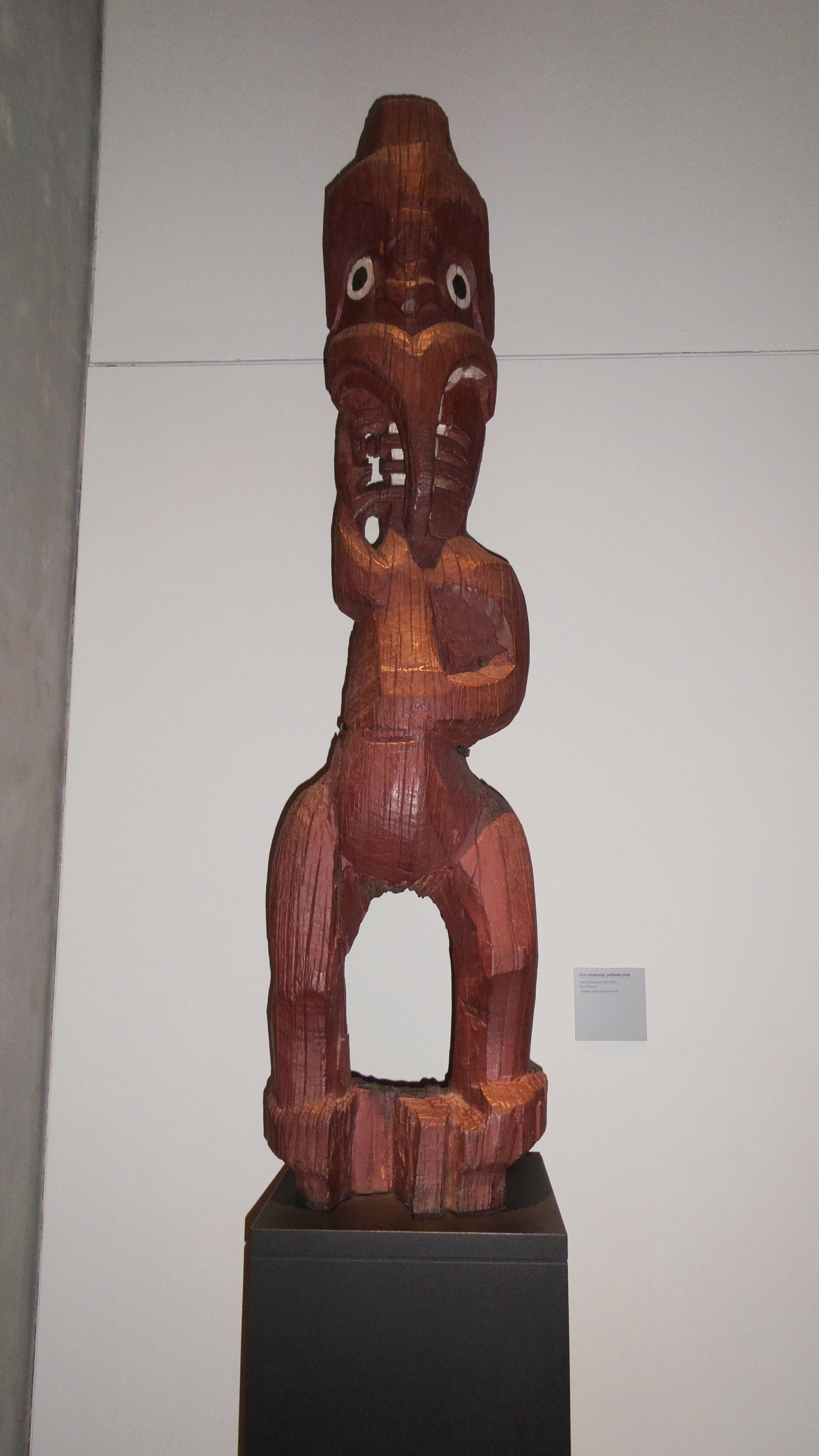
A pou whakarae in Te Papa, Museum of New Zealand

A pou whakarae is the prominent post in the palisade of a Māori pā. They were traditionally made of wood and intricately carved.

== See also ==
- Pou whenua
