= Martín Pou =

Spanish lawyer

Martín Pou y Roseló was a lawyer from Mallorca who was leader of the Philippine Falange.
