= Kotiate =

Māori weapon

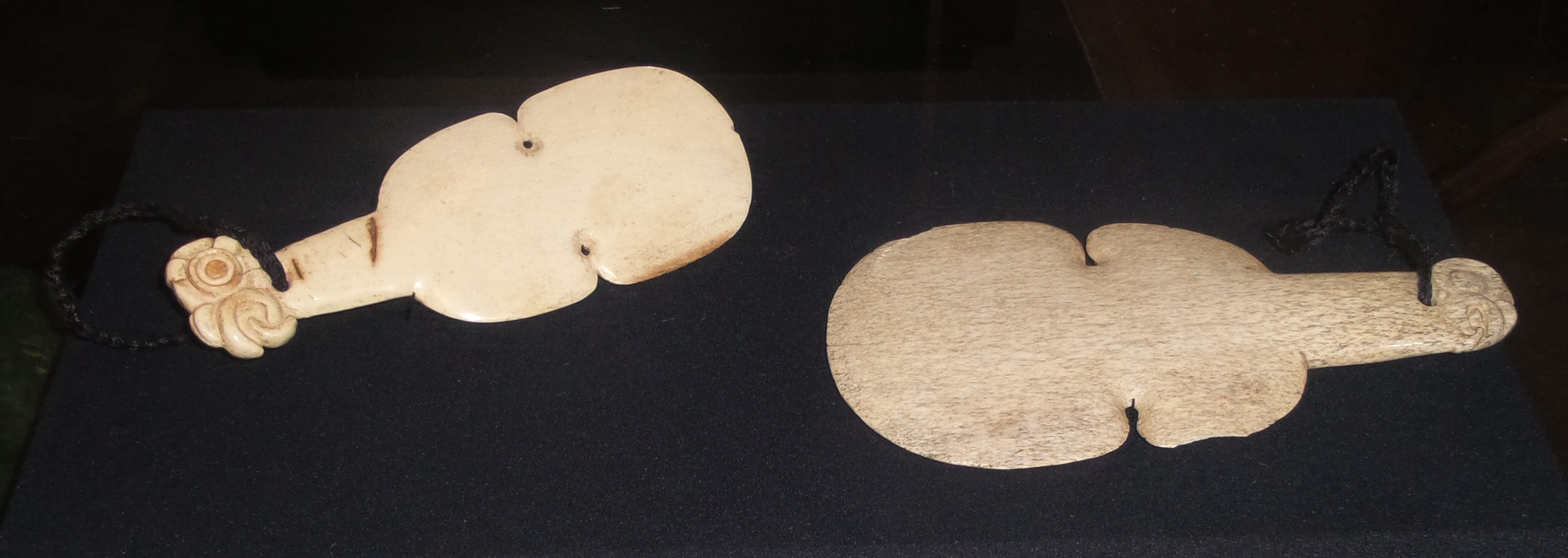
Two kotiate made of whalebone

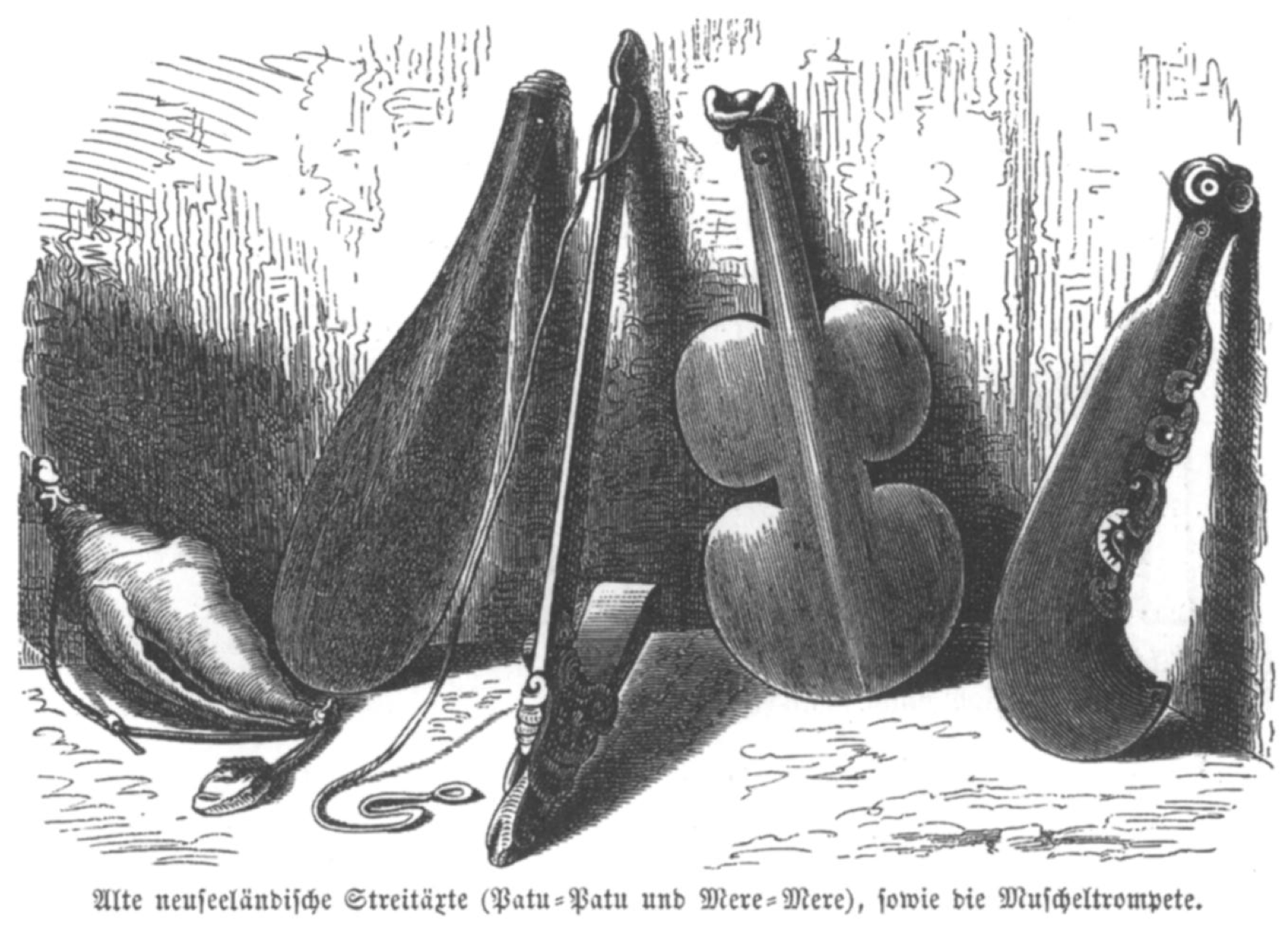
Māori war-clubs. The kotiate is second from right.

Kotiate is a type of traditional hand weapon of the Māori, the indigenous people of New Zealand.

A kotiate is a short club normally made of wood or whalebone. Kotiate means to cut or divide the liver (koti = cut in two or divide; ate = liver), is probably taken from its shape, which resembles the lobed part of the human liver.

== See also ==
- Mere (weapon)
- Pouwhenua
- Tewhatewha
- Patu
- Taiaha
- Wahaika
