= Tewhatewha =

Long-handled Māori club weapon

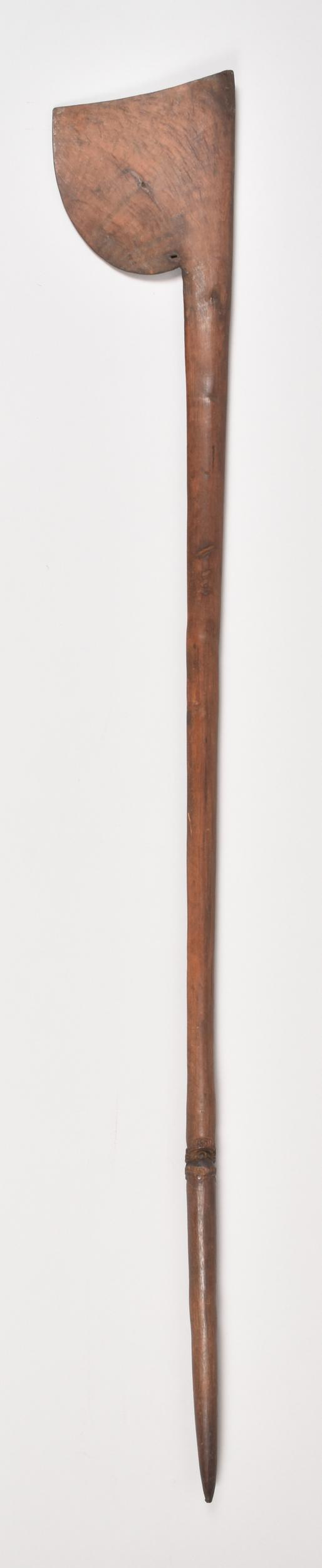
A tewhatewha at the British Museum.

A tewhatewha is a long-handled Māori club weapon shaped like an axe. Designed to be held in two hands, the weapon comes to a mata (point) at one end and a rapa (broad, quarter-round head) at the other.

The tewhatewha (pronounced [tefa tefa] or [teʍa teʍa]) is a traditional weapon used by the indigenous Māori people of New Zealand. As one of the two-handed clubs of Māori (the others being the hani and the pouwhenua), it can be easily identified by its long handle and flat, broad blade on one end. These two characteristics make it a unique and versatile tool used in both combat and ceremony.

== Design ==
Shaped like a long-handled axe, tewhatewha were usually carved from hardwood but could be made from other materials such as whalebone and might include slit hawk or kererū feathers. Typically, one end is a broad, quarter-round head (rapa), the long shaft averages 45 inches in length, the weapon ends in a mata (point) at the end of the handle, and at the base of the mata and shaft is a hole from which a tuft of feathers (puhipuhi or paupuhi) suspends. This design facilitated striking, parrying, and thrusting techniques for both mid-range engagements (using the rapa) and close-quarters combat (using the mata). There is often a band of carving above the mata with symbolic meanings. The feathers are prepared ceremonially and bound with flax.

== Historical use ==
Historically, the tewhatewha was a formidable weapon used by Māori warriors in warfare. The tewhatewha is held just above the carving at the sharp end, similar to using a fighting axe. Like pouwhenua and taiaha, this long club was designed for sparring and fast strokes and thrusts, aided by quick footwork on the part of the wielder. The blows were not struck with the blade as one would with an axe, but rather with the thicker straight front edge. Should an enemy begin attacking in close quarters, the pointed end could be used as a bayonet. Due to its length, it doubled as a signalling device from leaders to their warriors to convey directions and signal attacks. The plume of feathers dangling from the rapa distracted the enemy's gaze and could also be used to absorb blood.

== Ceremonial significance ==
Beyond its battlefield utility, the tewhatewha holds significant cultural and ceremonial value in Māori society. Often adorned with feathers and intricate carvings, the tewhatewha symbolizes authority, leadership, and ancestral connections. The complex scrolled pattern carved towards the handle's base represents the genealogy of the owner, embodying ancestral knowledge and spiritual lineage. Occasionally, ceremonial tewhatewha made of whalebone were used in this way. The Maori believed that the mana of the tewhatewha grew over its history of use; honoured weapons were passed down from generation to generation, continuing to grow in mana.

== Training and martial arts ==
Training in the use of the tewhatewha is a core aspect of mau rākau, the traditional Māori martial art. Mau rākau encompasses techniques and discipline related to various traditional weapons, including the tewhatewha. This training preserves Māori martial traditions and cultural heritage.

== Modern use and cultural importance ==
Tewhatewha remain a symbol of Māori cultural identity and heritage today. They are used in cultural ceremonies, performances, and other traditional contexts.

== Recent sightings ==
A tewhatewha was the symbol of command of Royal New Zealand Navy hydrographic survey ship HMNZS Resolution.

The drum major of the New Zealand Army Band uses a tewhatewha instead of a mace to give direction and keep time.

== Gallery ==
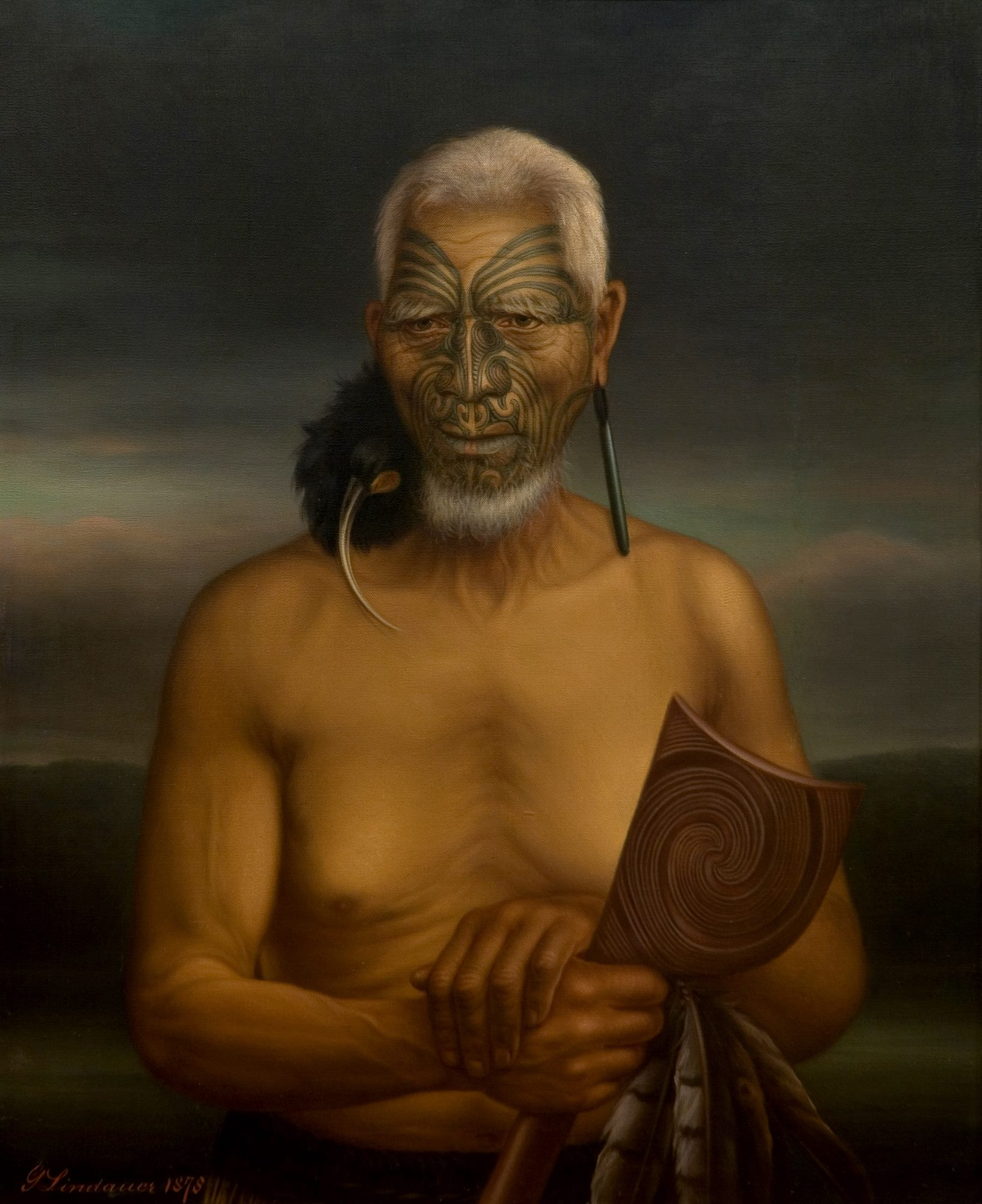
Tukukino, 1878 by Gottfried Lindauer, oil on canvas

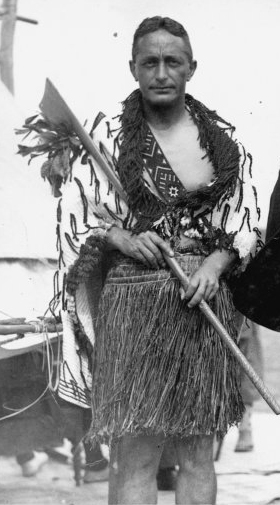
Pei Te Hurinui Jones (1898-1976) holding tewhatewha. Detail of King Koroki Te Rata Mahuta Tawhiao Potatau Te Wherowhero and others by unknown photographer. Alexander Turnbull Library (PAColl-0671-01)

== See also ==
- Mau rākau - The traditional Māori martial art that includes training with the tewhatewha.
- Taiaha - Another traditional Māori weapon.

=== Other Māori weapons ===
- Mere (weapon)
- Kotiate
- Taiaha
- Patu
- Pouwhenua
