= Patu =

Club or pounder used by the Māori

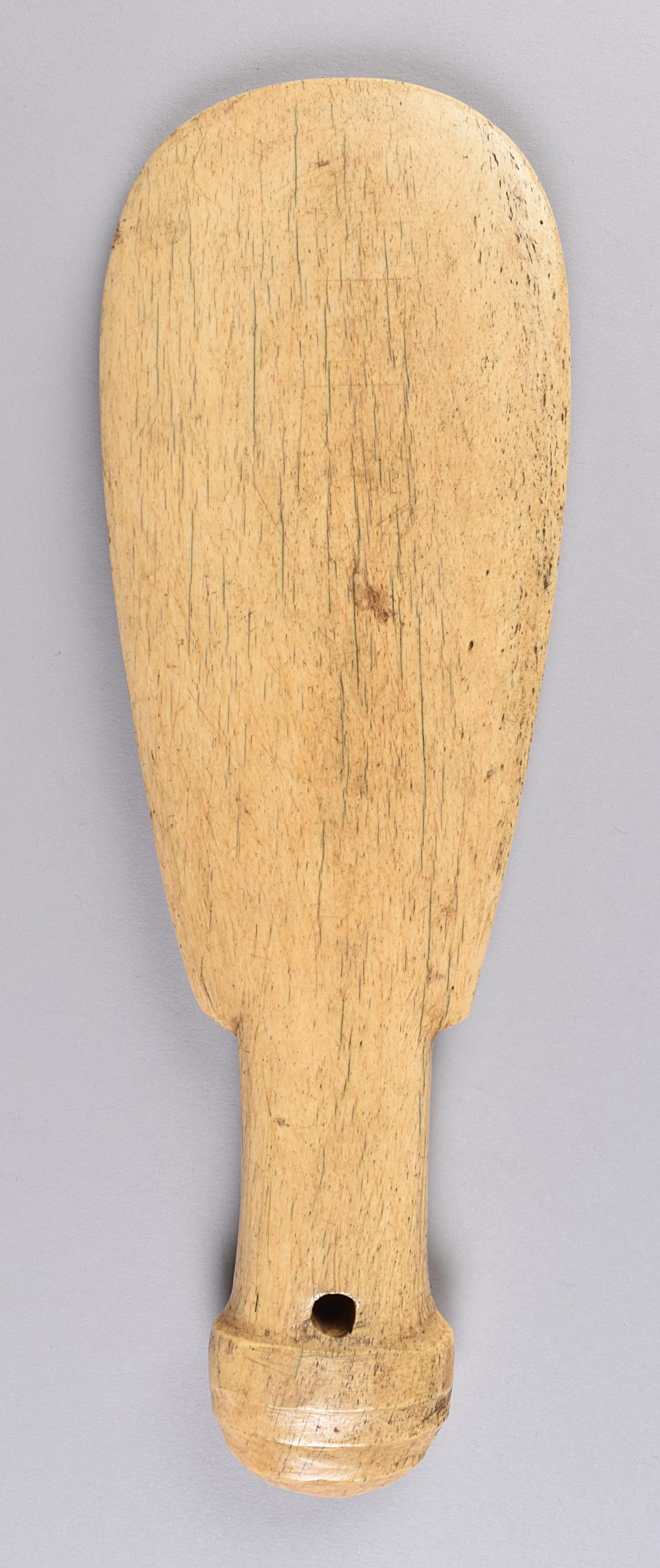
A patu paraoa at the British Museum.

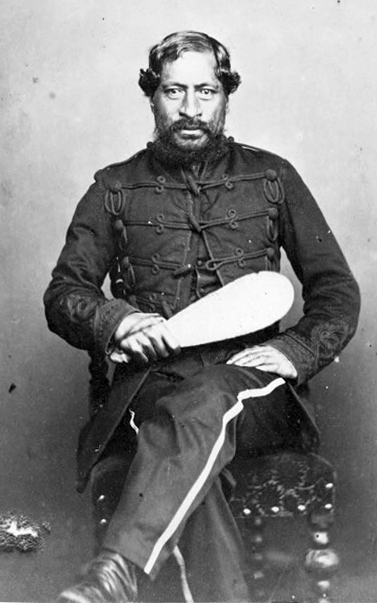
Mete Kīngi Paetahi, circa 1869 by unknown photographer.

A patu is a club or pounder used by the Māori. The word patu in the Māori language means to strike, hit, beat, kill or subdue.

== Weapons ==
These types of short-handled clubs were mainly used as a striking weapon. The blow administered with this weapon was a horizontal thrust straight from the shoulder at the enemy's temple. If the foe could be grasped by the hair then the patu would be driven up under the ribs or jaw. Patu were made from hardwood, whale bone, or stone. The most prestigious material for the patu was pounamu (greenstone). Māori decorated the patu by carving into the wood, bone or stone.

Types of patu include:

- patu pounamu or mere: made from pounamu (greenstone).
- patu onewa: made of stone. These resemble the mere in outline but thicker, because the stone used was more easily broken than the resilient pounamu.
- patu paraoa: made of whale bone
- patu tawaka and patuki: made from wood. Other styles of short-handled wooden clubs include the kotiate and wahaika.

Less traditional is the rare patu pora, made from iron and the hatchet or whaling harpoon heads (pātītī).

The patu normally has "a round or rectangular hole in the handle for the tau, or wrist cord". The wrist cord is generally a short or medium piece of rope that is tied together to form a complete loop. The wielder places his hand inside the loop up to his wrist, and quickly spins the patu in order to wind up the cord (around the wrist and hand), thus securing the weapon on the hand. A feathered tassel may also be added at the end of the cord as a form of distraction to the adversary as the patu is wielded against him.

== Pounders ==
Types of nonweapon patu include:

- patu muka: a pounder used to soften flax fibre (muka) in preparation for weaving.
- patu aruhe: a pounder used to break up edible fern roots for food.

== Gallery ==
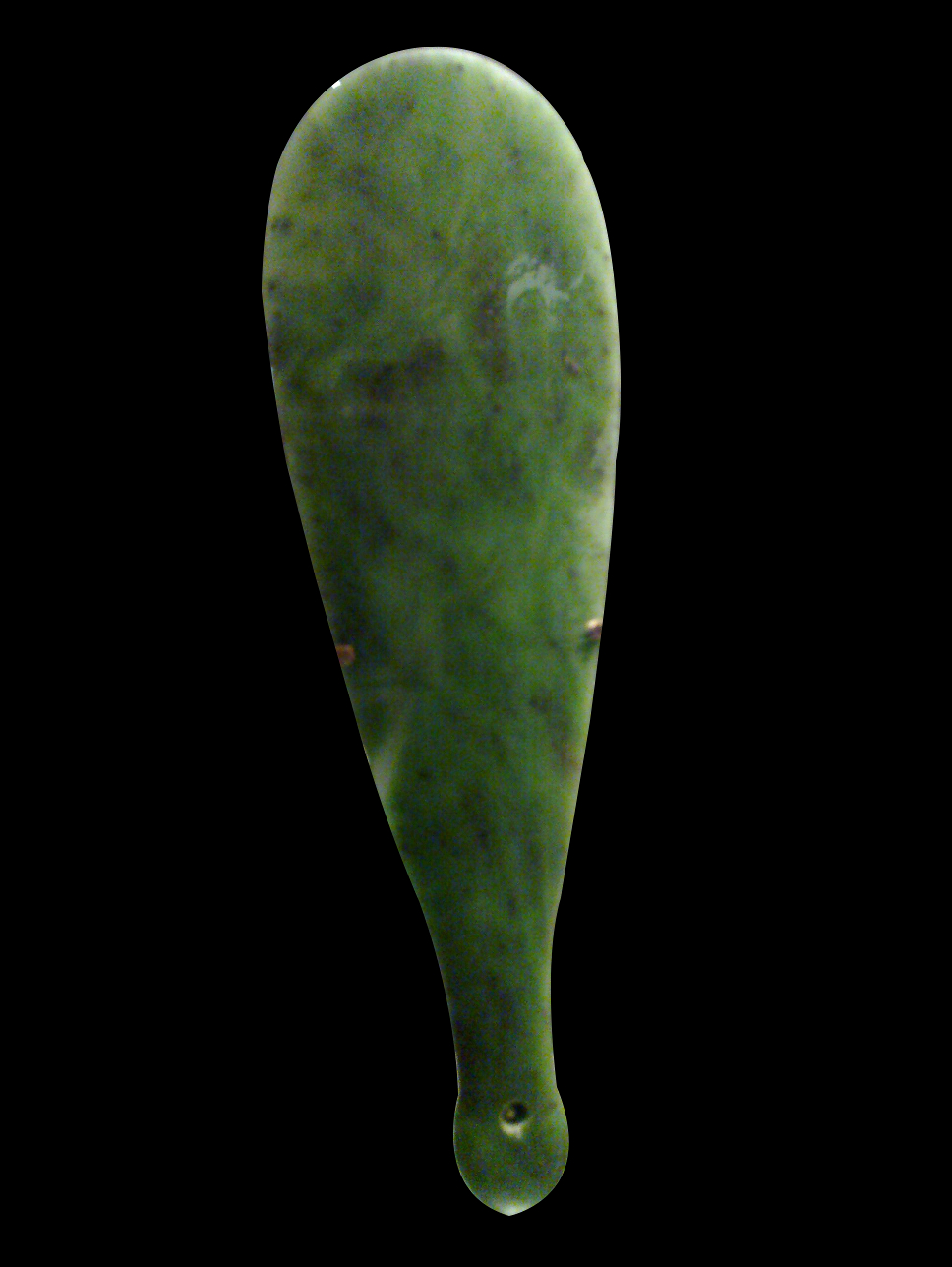
Patu pounamu made from greenstone

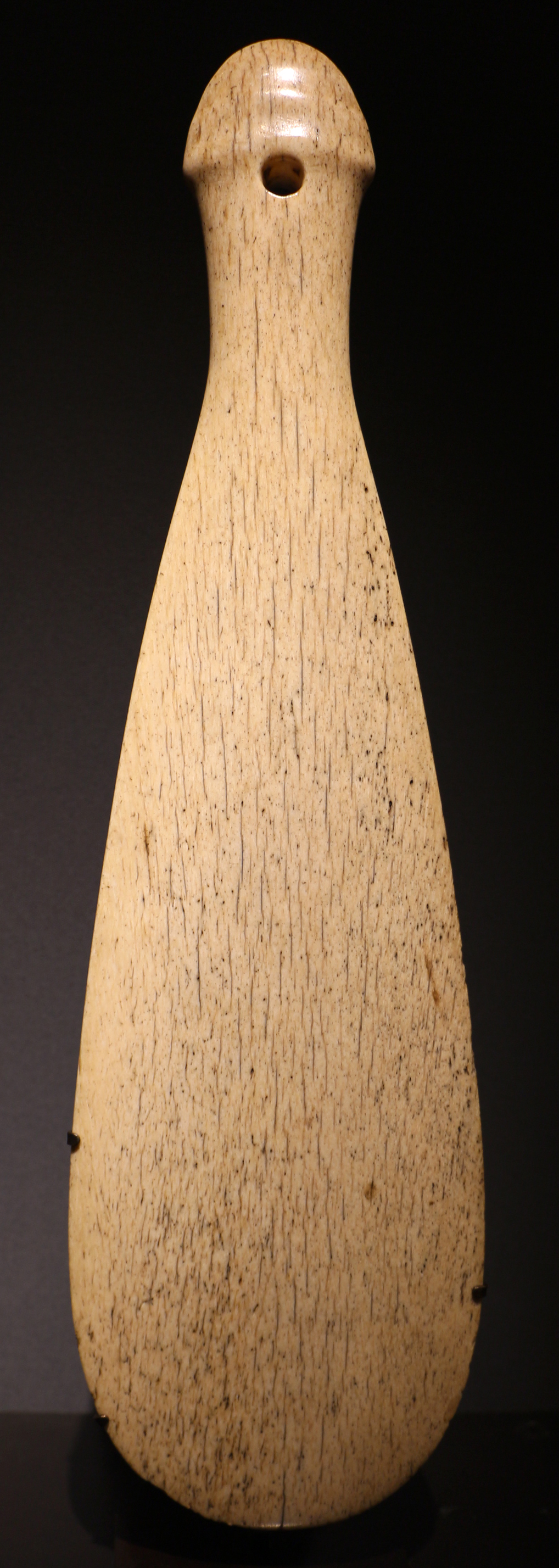
Patu paraoa made from whale bone

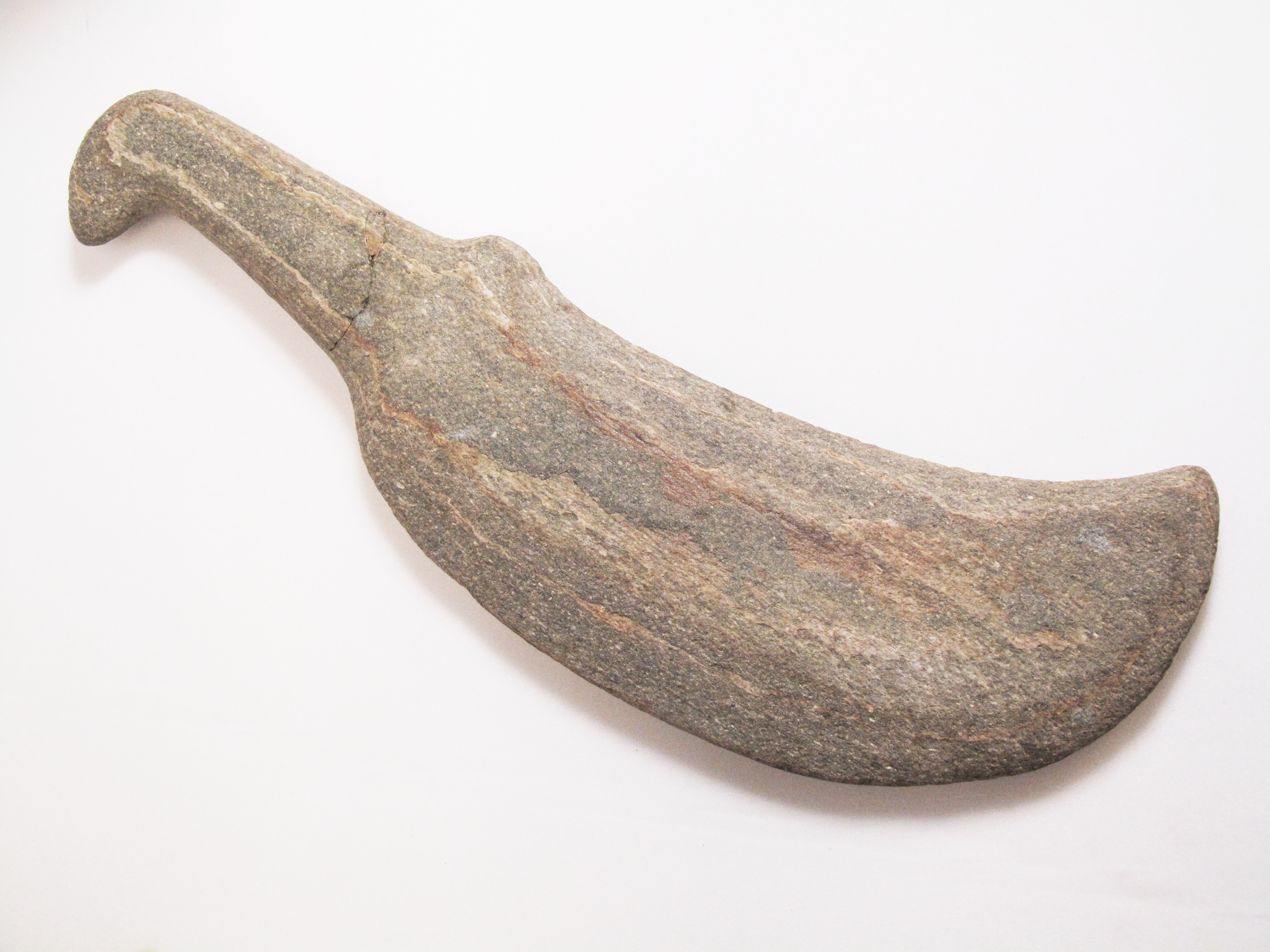
Patu onewa made from stone

== See also ==
- Mere (weapon)
- Pouwhenua
- Tewhatewha
- Kotiate
- Taiaha
- Wahaika
