= Mere (weapon) =

Māori weapon

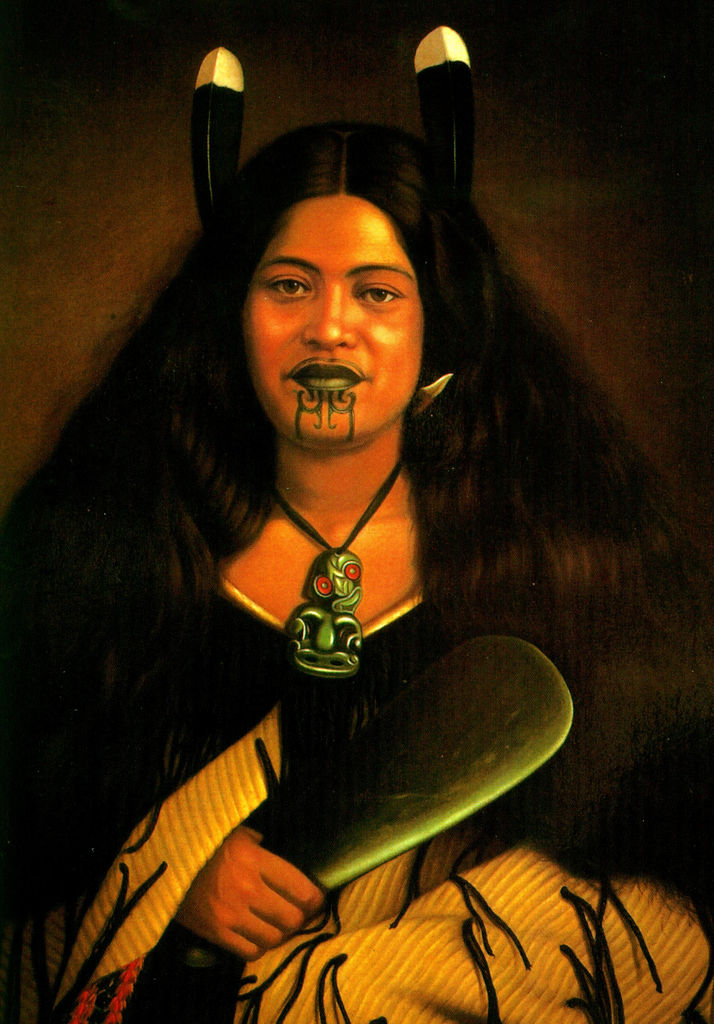
Pare Watene in 1878 holding a mere (by Gottfried Lindauer)

The mere (Māori pronunciation: [ˈmɛrɛ]) is a type of short, broad-bladed weapon in the shape of an enlarged tear drop. It was used to strike or jab an opponent in the body or the head, usually made from nephrite jade (pounamu or greenstone). A mere is one of the traditional, hand to hand, one-handed weapons of the indigenous Māori of New Zealand, and a symbol of chieftainship.

== Form ==
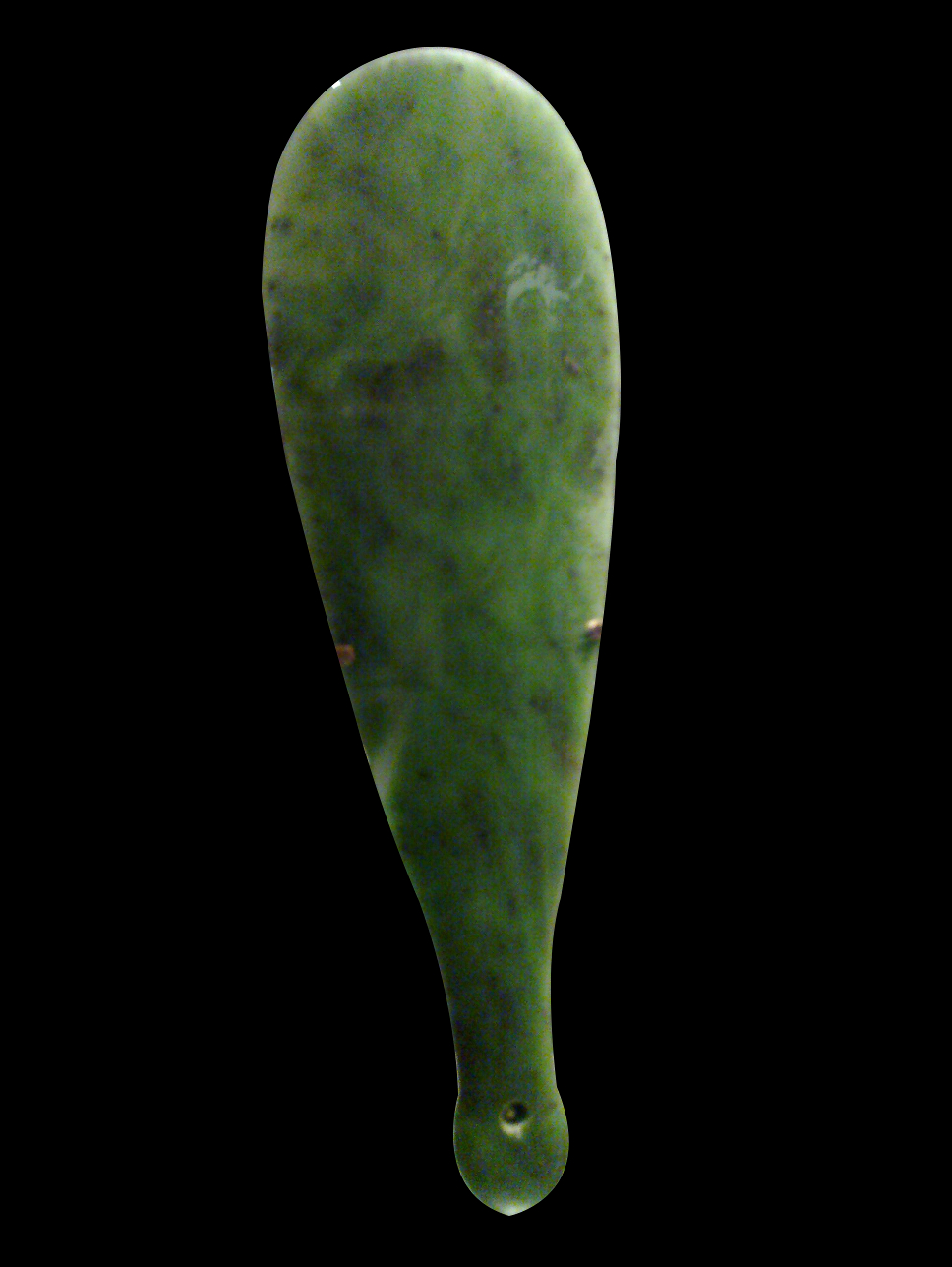
'Kataore', mere pounamu (42cm x 12cm)

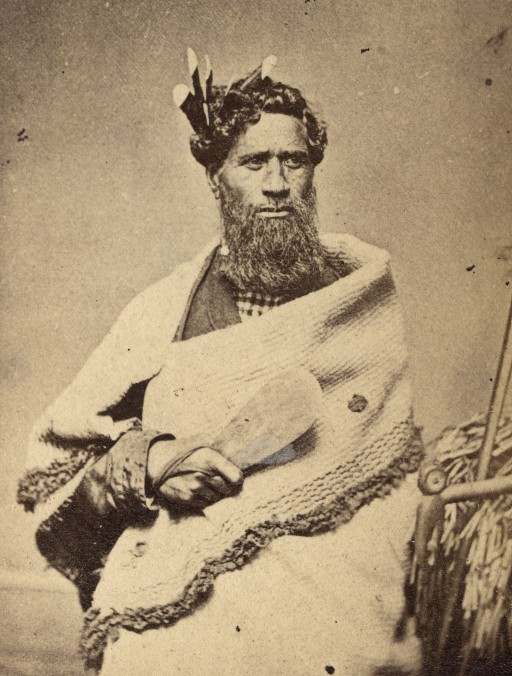
Māori chief holding a mere (1860–1879)

The mere is a spatulate, leaf shaped, form of short club. It has a broad, rounded apex that narrows to form a handle, terminating in a butt or heel (reke), marked by several grooves. Mere have two convex, almost flat sides and a rounded top. The top of the mere was ground to a sharp edge, extending down both sides of the weapon.

Generally, short clubs had holes carved or drilled through the butt end of the handle, allowing a wrist cord (tau or patui) made of plaited New Zealand flax, or Polynesian dog skin, to be passed through and attached to the wielder's wrist. Passing the wrist cord over the thumb and around the hand prevented the club from slipping during use.

Mere are between 25 and 50 centimetres (10 and 20 in), with an average length of 35 centimetres (14 in). The width of a mere is similarly variable, from under 7 to over 12 centimetres (3 to 5 in). The dimensions of a mere were generally determined by the characteristics of the raw materials the club was made from. Extremely long or short mere are unwieldy in combat, and are likely to have been mainly used for ceremonial purposes.

== Material and manufacture ==
While the term mere was, and is, used in some regions to refer exclusively to clubs made from pounamu, in other regions, mere was more broadly used to refer to patu of a similar shape and design made from hardwood (meremere, mere rakau), whalebone (patu paraoa), or stone (patu ōnewa) – in these areas, a mere made from greenstone was known as a mere pounamu or patu pounamu.

The pounamu used to make a mere was carefully chosen to be flawless and to have a good colour. A block of greenstone was first rough cut using pieces of quartzite combined with sand and water. Dressing of the surface was done with fine sandstone and pieces of very hard smooth stone. Due to the toughness of greenstone, mere pounamu were able to be made thinner than other similar patu made from stone, however this made the process of manufacture slow and arduous. The creation and finishing of a mere pounamu is claimed to have sometimes taken more than one generation to complete.

== Usage ==
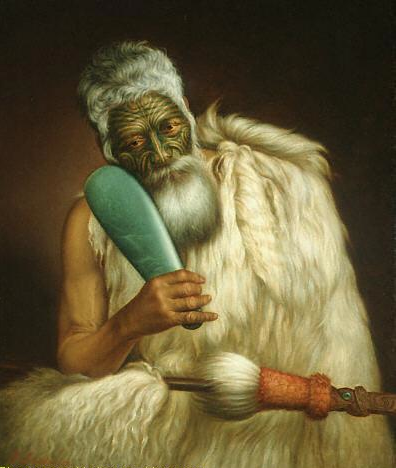
Wiremu Kīngi Te Apaapa holding a jade mere (painted by Gottfried Lindauer)

=== Combat ===
Mere, and other patu, were used for close-quarter fighting. Held in one hand, these close-range striking weapons were used primarily for end-on thrusting or jabbing (tipi). In combat, jabbing thrusts or strikes would be directed at the ribs, neck or temple. It has been claimed that a strike to the skull combined with a twisting flick of the wrist could force or wrench the victim's skull open. The designed use of the mere for forward striking thrusts is an unusual characteristic of Māori patu, where in other parts of the world, clubs are generally wielded with an ax-like downward blow. The butt (reke) of a mere could also be used to strike an opponent's head.

A mere pounamu was much harder than a patu of wood or bone, and much tougher – less likely to fracture – than a patu ōnewa of any other type of stone.

It was stated that a proficient warrior armed with a patu was able to defeat a man armed with a longer weapon, like a taiaha or a spear. A fighter using a patu often used a type of pad (whakapuru), held or on the off-side arm, used to parry or lessen the impact of an opposing weapon.

When not in use mere were carried in a flax belt (tātua) or sometimes suspended from a wrist cord.

Kotahitanga flag, featuring a mere

=== Ceremonial ===
Pounamu was highly prized by Māori and the mere pounamu as the weapon of a chief or rangatira, was the most revered of all Māori weapons. These mere were passed through generations; they were given names, and were said to possess a spiritual quality or mana of their own. Particularly special mere were imbued with magical powers, or supernatural qualities. Due to the high value placed on revered mere pounamu they would often be hidden when not in use, and kept in specially constructed cases. Considerable efforts were undertaken, often by an entire tribe, to recover or regain significant mere that were lost or stolen. Mere were buried with their chiefly owners, but were considered so valuable that they were later recovered from the grave during the second burial. It was considered an honour to be killed by a specially significant mere pounamu. Captives would sometimes volunteer their own mere pounamu as their means of execution rather than be killed by a lesser weapon.

Giving such a valuable item was common as a sign of good faith and it retains this symbolic importance today.

The mere is shown as one of the features of the Māori Kotahitanga flag, where it is crossed with a scroll representing the Treaty of Waitangi.

== See also ==
- Kotiate
- Leiomano
- Pouwhenua
- Tewhatewha
- Wahaika
