= Pouwhenua =

Māori carved wooden posts to mark places of significance

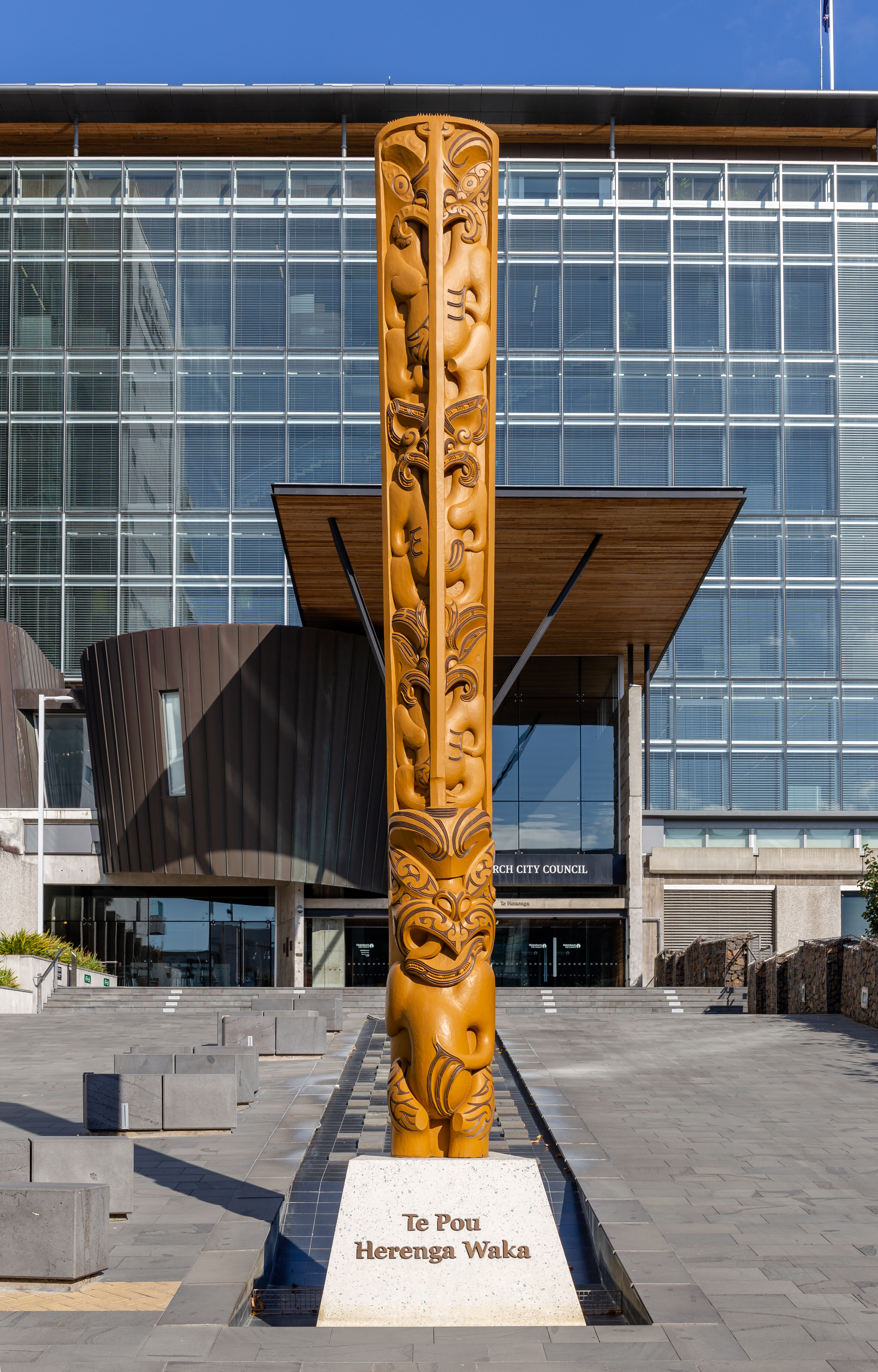
Pouwhenua in front of Civic Offices, Hereford Street, Christchurch, New Zealand

Pouwhenua, pou whenua (lit. 'land posts') or simply pou are carved wooden posts used by Māori, the indigenous peoples of New Zealand to mark territorial boundaries or places of significance. They are generally artistically and elaborately carved and can be found throughout New Zealand.

== Cultural significance ==
Much like totem poles, pou whenua tell a story. They are significant to the Māori people, representing their contributions to the cultural heritage of New Zealand. They acknowledge the association between the people (tāngata) and the land (whenua). Specifically, they reflect the relationship between the ancestors, environment, and the reputation or standing of the tangata whenua.

== Weapon ==
The name pouwhenua is also applied to a fighting club, belonging to the same class of weaponry as the tewhatewha and taiaha. Pouwhenua are usually made of wood and have a large, broad blade known as rau at one end and a pointed, sharp tip at the other end. Usually a human head motif was carved on the shaft to form a boundary between the shaft and the long spear point. Pouwhenua were used for attacking an opponent with short sharp strikes or stabbing thrusts with quick footwork on the part of the wielder. A single blow with the broad blade could easily result in death.

== See also ==
- Pou whakarae

Other Māori weapons:

- Mere (weapon)
- Kotiate
- Tewhatewha
- Patu
- Taiaha
- Wahaika
