= Te Rangi-ita (Ngāti Tūwharetoa) =

Māori ariki (chieftain)

Te Rangi-ita was a Māori ariki (chieftain) of Ngāti Tūwharetoa from the region around Lake Taupō, New Zealand. He participated with bravery in the Ngāti Tama-Ngāti Tūwharetoa War, fought off an invasion by the Ngāti Raukawa chieftain Te Ata-inutai, and forged a peace through his marriage to Te Ata-inutai's daughter, Waitapu. Through their children, he is an ancestor of many hapū of Ngāti Tūwharetoa, including Ngāti Te Rangiita, the main hapū on the south shore of Lake Taupō, where the town of Te Rangi-ita is named after him. He probably lived in the early seventeenth century.

== Life ==
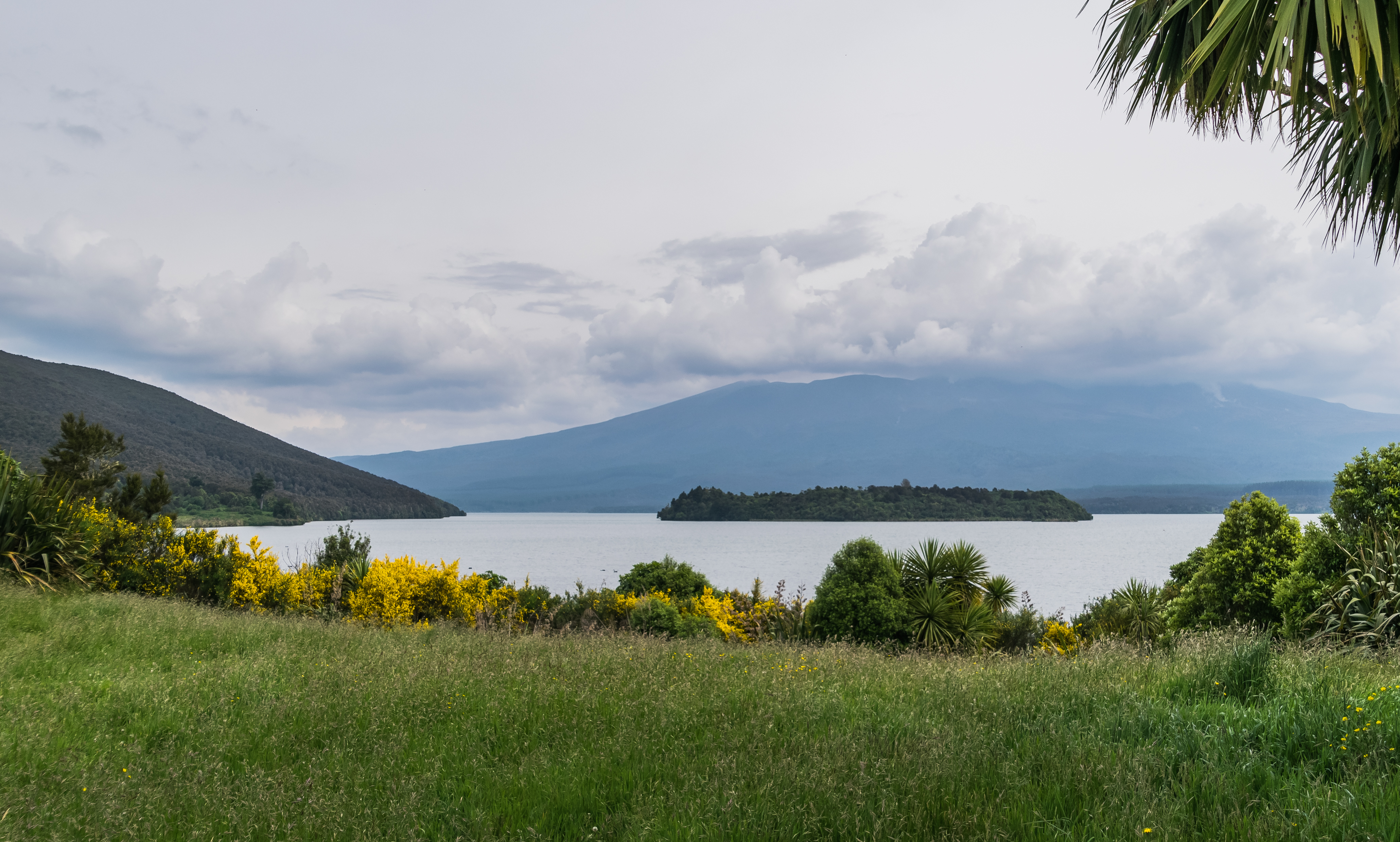
View of Lake Rotoaira, looking towards Pihanga.

Te Rangi-ita was the son of Tū-te-tawhā and Hinemihi. His name at birth was Te Pukeihaua. Through his father, Te Rangi-ita was a descendant of Tūwharetoa i te Aupōuri.

Tū-te-tawhā had been killed along with his brother Te Rapuhora during a war with Ngāti Apa. The two of them had joined their cousin Waikari in an attack on the Ngāti Apa fortress Rangi-te-taea, which was located at the foot of Mount Pihanga on the coast of Lake Rotoaira. Tū-te-tawhā and Te Rapuhora decided to go into the fortress and speak to Ngāti Apa directly, covering themselves in kōkōwai (red ochre), since touching someone with kōkōwai was a method of cancelling out someone's tapu. Their wives said "your kokowai has an evil smell; it is an omen of misfortune," but they replied "No; it is a sign of good luck." They went by canoe to Rangi-te-taea and were welcomed into the village, performing the hongi with all the men and women. Then the Ngāti Apa rangatira, Umu-ariki and Miromiro killed them, cut off their heads, and threw them into the latrine.

=== War with Ngāti Tama ===
Ngāti Tama were an iwi of Te Arawa that had settled on the west bank of Lake Taupo. Te Rangi-ita's great-uncle, the Tūwharetoa ariki, Rua-wehea, who lived at Whaka-uenuku at Karangahape, established himself as the overlord of Ngāti Tama, but he exercised this position in an arrogant manner.

Therefore, when Rua-wehea came to visit the Ngāti Tama at Whanganui, they burnt some weeds, so that he would think that food had been prepared for him, then they welcomed him onto their marae, and killed Rua-wehea, along with all of his companions, except for the young Te Rangi-ita, who escaped.

When he heard what had happened, Rua-wehea's cousin, Waikari, who was also an ariki of Ngāti Tūwharetoa, gathered a war party of 800 men of Tūwharetoa, at his base on Motu-o-puhi island on Lake Rotoaira, just south of the southern end of Lake Taupo. Then he led this force to attack the main Ngāti Tama village, Keri-tāne, located on the north bank of the Waihāhā River, where it flows into Lake Taupo. They attacked the village in a dawn raid and slaughtered many of Ngāti Tama without a fight.

While the fighting was going on one of the Ngāti Tama rangatira, Rongo-hape, made a break for it, fleeing towards where the Tūwharetoa canoes were tied up. The only one who had been left to look after the canoes was the young boy Te Rangi-ita, the sole survivor of the massacre at Whanganui. When Rongo-hape reached the canoes he jumped from the shore, but missed his landing and fell into the water. Te Rangi-ita grabbed a paddle and whacked him over the head as he surfaced, killing him, and earning himself a reputation for prowess. As a result of this deed he received the name Te Rangi-ita (‘the sky strikes with intent to kill’) instead of his earlier name Te Pukeihaua.

=== War and peace with Te Ata-inutai ===
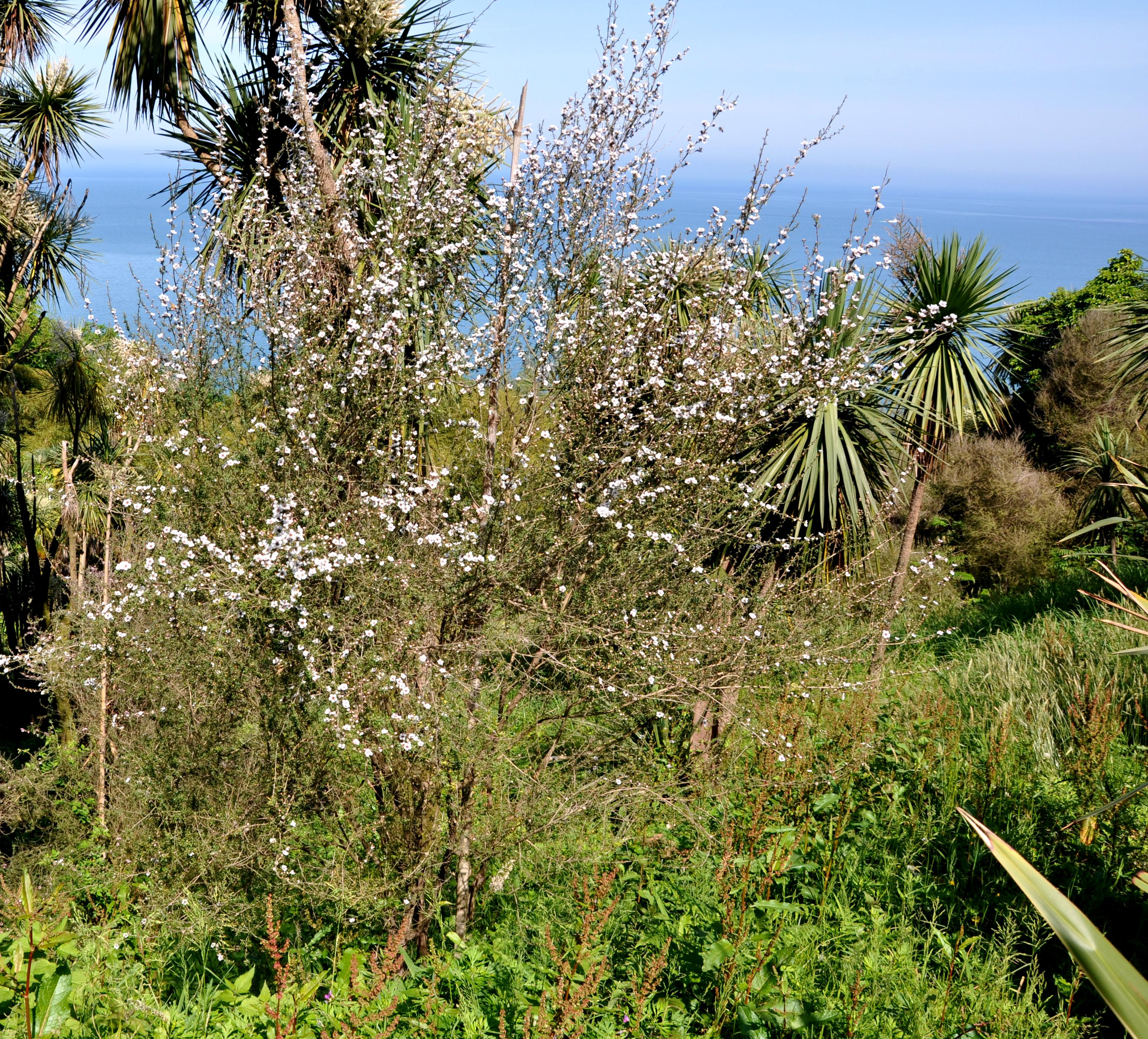
Mānuka tree.

During the Ngāti Tama-Ngāti Tūwharetoa war, Waikari had attacked and killed the Ngāti Raukawa rangatira Poutū. His cousin, Te Ata-inutai, subsequently gathered a war party to get revenge for this killing. He led this force down the Waikato River and along the east coast of Lake Taupō. After taking Pōnui at Rangatira Point and killing Waikari at Koro-tanuku (modern Tauranga Taupō), Te Ata-inutai came to Whakāngiangi (near modern Te Rangi-ita), where most of the Tūwharetoa warriors had gathered under the command of Te Rangi-ita and Tūmata-ngaua (they had been warned of his approach by Tūwharetoa a Turiroa, who had escaped the slaughter at Pōnui).

Te Ata-inutai's forces attacked the fort, but its defences were too strong for them, so they settled into a siege. During the siege, Te Ata-inutai was struck by a spear made of mānuka wood, which pierced both of his buttocks. He shouted up to the defenders, asking who had hit him, and when Te Rangi-ita revealed that he had thrown the spear, Te Ata-inutai called him down and made peace with him, giving him his daughter, Waitapu as a wife.

After this Te Ata-inutai returned to Whaka-puhunga, while Waitapu and Te Rangi-ita settled at Marae-kōwhai north of Lake Taupō, near Mōkai. The genealogical links (whakapapa) resulting from the marriage between Waitapu and Te Rangi-ita are recounted in a waiata by Peou, which is included in Āpirana Ngata and Pei Te Hurinui Jones' collection of waiata Nga Moteatea.

=== Marriage and murder of Te Ata-inutai ===
For a long time, Te Rangi-ita and Waitapu had only daughters and, as a result, Te Rangi-ita stopped visiting Waitapu. She said to him "The river at Nukuhau is still open," meaning that she was still able to bear children (Nukuhau was a village located at the source of the Waikato River), but Te Rangi-ita did not listen, so she left Marae-kōwhai, travelling home to her father, who performed special karakia ('incantations') and told her that if she returned to Marae-kōwhai and had sex with Te Rangi-ita, she would bear a son, which is what happened. In Hoeta Te Hata's account, however, the rituals were carried out by a nameless tohunga (priest), Waitapu came home already pregnant, and Te Ata-inutai planned to kill his grandchild if it proved to be male, but Waitapu covered the baby's front and tricked him into believing that she had given birth to another daughter.

When Te Ata-inutai heard of the birth of Waitapu's first son, he set out for Marae-kōwhai in order to perform the tohi baptismal ritual for the newborn, who was called Tama-mutu. On his way home, however, Te Ata-inutai was ambushed and killed at Waipapa, below the Pou-a-kani cliff by a war party of Ngāti Tūwharetoa led by a rangatira called Kewha (according to Pei Te Hurinui Jones), in revenge for the earlier deaths of Hine-te-ao and Waikari. Hoeta Te Hata says that the killer's name was Kūha and that the murder took place on the Mangakino Stream. According to him, Te Ata-inutai was taking his oldest granddaughter, Pare-kāwa, back to Marae-kōwhai.

Eventually, Te Rangi-ita and Waitapu's youngest son Tū-te-tawhā arranged for Whiti-patatō of Ngāti Raukawa to lead a war party that avenged Te Ata-inutai's murder by attacking the Ngāti Tūwharetoa settlement of Tuhinga-mata. Although Te Rangi-ita called on Whiti-patatō to lead his force to Marae-kōwhai quickly, he stopped in the Kainga-roa district, saying "Not yet! I am going to rove (tihoi) about this plain" or "my path must be a hidden one (tihoi), from which the plain received the name Tīhoi.

== Family ==
Te Rangi-ita married Te Ata-inutai's daughter Waitapu and had four daughters:

- Pare-kāwa, ancestor of Ngāti Parekāwa
- Te Uru-kaihina, who married a man at Tuhua, west of Taupō, subsequently murdered by her youngest brother.
- Te Piunga-tai
- Tore-iti

After this, they had several sons:

- Tama-mutu
- Manu-nui, ancestor of Ngāti Manunui
- Meremere
- Tū-te-tawhā Whare-oneone, ancestor of Ngāti Tutetawhā

== Sources ==
The earliest published reference to Te Rangi-ita occurs in Samuel Locke's 1882 account of the Ngāti Tama-Ngāti Tūwharetoa war, which he says he translated from written accounts produced by unnamed Māori tohunga. An account of his life is also included in a 1904 article by Walter Edward Gudgeon, with no indication of the sources on which it is based. A detailed account was given in a series of articles by Rev. Hoeta Te Hata in 1916 and 1917, published in the Polynesian Society's journal. Much of this account is followed by John Te Herekiekie Grace in his 1959 history of Tūwharetoa. Pei Te Hurinui Jones gives a similar account, which he heard from Tuturu Hōne Tere of Ngāti Tūwharetoa and Ngāti Raukawa descent.

== Bibliography ==
- Locke, Samuel (1882). "Historical Traditions of Taupo and East Coast Tribes". Transactions and Proceedings of the Royal Society of New Zealand. 15: 433–459.
- Gudgeon, W. E. (1904). "The Toa Taua or Warrior". Journal of the Polynesian Society. 13: 238–264.
- Te Hata, Hoeta (September 1916a). "The Ngati-Tuhare-toa occupation of Taupo-nui-a-tia". The Journal of the Polynesian Society. 25 (3). Translated by Fletcher, H. J.: 104–116. JSTOR 20701145.
- Te Hata, Hoeta (December 1916b). "The Ngati-Tuhare-toa occupation of Taupo-nui-a-tia. (Continued)". The Journal of the Polynesian Society. 25 (4). Translated by Fletcher, H. J.: 150–162. JSTOR 20701156.
- Te Hata, Hoeta (March 1917a). "The Ngati-Tuhare-toa occupation of Taupo-nui-a-tia. (Continued)". The Journal of the Polynesian Society. 26 (1). Translated by Fletcher, H. J.: 19–30. JSTOR 20701170.
- Te Hata, Hoeta (June 1917b). "The Ngati-Tuhare-toa occupation of Taupo-nui-a-tia: The Red Garment of Tamamutu That Was Made for Te-Roro-o-te-rangi (Continued)". The Journal of the Polynesian Society. 26 (2). Translated by Fletcher, H. J.: 66–99. JSTOR 20701176.
- Te Hata, Hoeta (September 1917c). "The Ngati-Tuhare-toa occupation of Taupo-nui-a-tia. (Continued)". The Journal of the Polynesian Society. 26 (3). Translated by Fletcher, H. J.: 91–98. JSTOR 20701184.
- Te Hata, Hoeta (December 1917d). "The Ngati-Tuhare-toa occupation of Taupo-nui-a-tia. (Continued). Meremer and Te Heuheu the First". The Journal of the Polynesian Society. 26 (4). Translated by Fletcher, H. J.: 180–187. JSTOR 20701199.
- Grace, John Te Herekiekie (1959). Tuwharetoa: The history of the Maori people of the Taupo District. Auckland [N.Z.]: A.H. & A.W. Reed. ISBN 9780589003739
- Ngata, Apriana; Te Hurinui, Pei (1961). Nga Moteatea: he maramara rere no nga waka maha. He mea kohikohi na A. T. Ngata. Na Pei Te Hurinui I whakapaakehaa, Part II. Wellington [N.Z.]: Polynesian Society.
- Phillips, F. L. (1989). Nga tohu a Tainui / Landmarks of Tainui: A Geographical Record of Tainui Traditional History. Otorohanga: Tohu Publishers.
- Jones, Pei Te Hurinui; Biggs, Bruce (2004). Ngā iwi o Tainui : nga koorero tuku iho a nga tuupuna = The traditional history of the Tainui people. Auckland [N.Z.]: Auckland University Press. ISBN 1869403312.
