= Ngāti Tama–Ngāti Tūwharetoa War =

Conflict in New Zealand

Date	c. 1600
Location	Western shore of Lake Taupō, New Zealand
Result	Ngāti Tūwharetoa victory: Ngāti Tūwharetoa gain full control of Lake Taupō; Ngāti Tama migrate west to Motu-whanake, near Ohakuri

Belligerents
Ngāti Tama; Ngāti Raukawa	Ngāti Tūwharetoa

Commanders and leaders
Rongo-hauā; Rongo-hape †; Te Atua-reretahi; Poutū-te-rangi †	Waikari

The Ngāti Tama–Ngāti Tūwharetoa War was a conflict which took place around 1600 on the west coast of Lake Taupō in the central North Island of New Zealand, in which Ngāti Tūwharetoa fought against the Ngāti Tama iwi and a part of the Ngāti Raukawa iwi of Tainui. The war marked the end of Ngāti Tama and Ngāti Raukawa claims to the western coast of Lake Taupō. Thereafter, the whole lake was controlled by Tūwharetoa.

== Background ==
Locations in the Ngāti Tama–Ngāti Tūwharetoa War
1 Waihora
2 Marae-kōwhai (near Mokai)
3 Hingarae
4 Keri-tāne / Waihāhā
5 Whanganui
6 Whaka-uenuku, Karangahape cliffs
7 Maraeroa
8 Motu-o-puhi
9 Motu-whanake

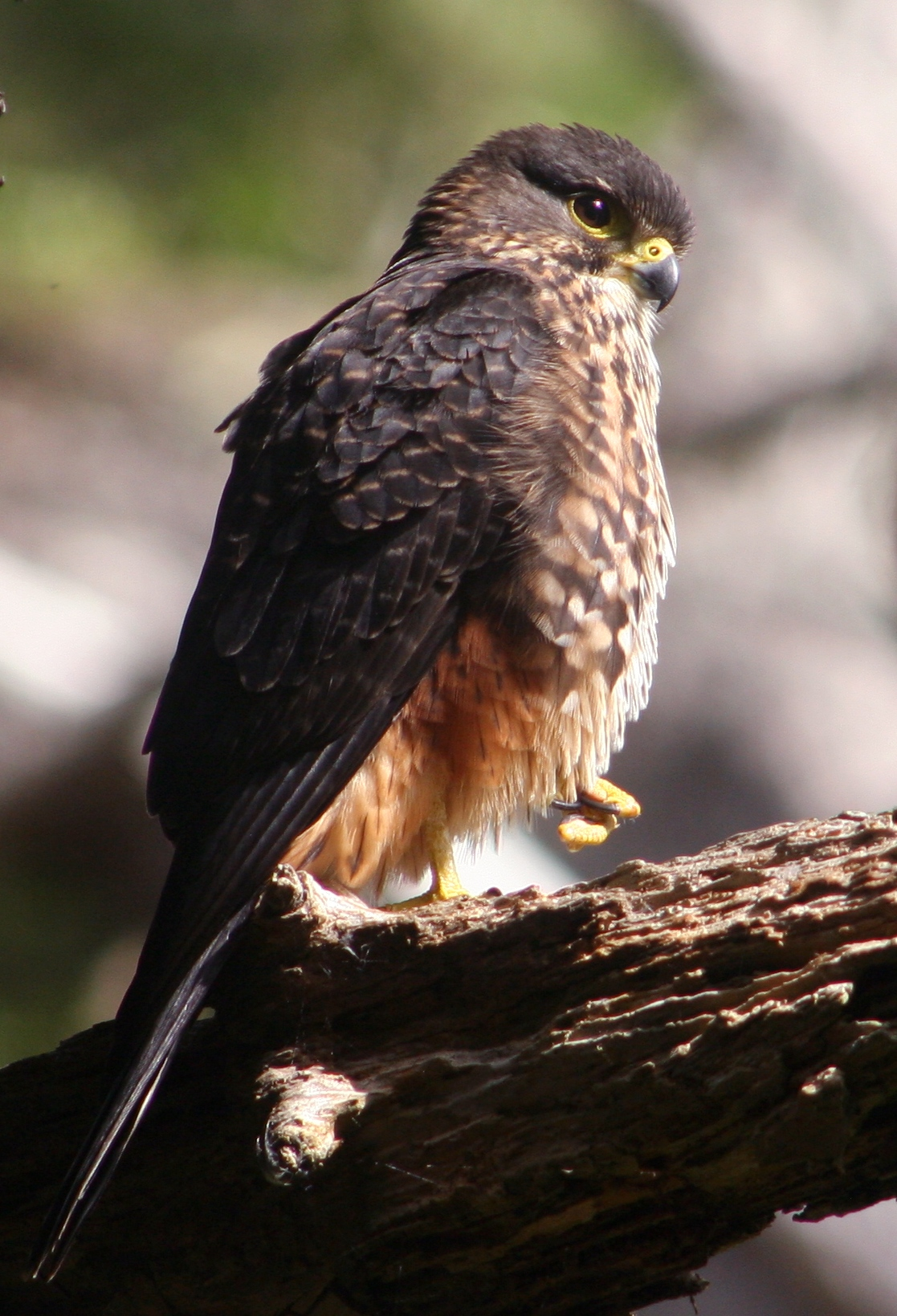
Bush falcon, whose cry sounds like the pū kāeaea with which Rua-wehea antagonised Ngāti Tama

Ngāti Tama (full name Ngāti Tamaihu-toroa) were an iwi of Te Arawa that had been driven out of the Bay of Plenty region and migrated south, where they settled in Tainui territory on the west shore of Lake Taupō, establishing a number of villages in the area, including: Ōpurakete, Waihora, Marae-kōwhai, Hingarae, Keri-tāne at Waihāhā, Whanganui, Hikurangi, and Purukete. They had three rangatira, Rongo-hauā ('Lame Rongo'), Rongo-hape ('Club-foot Rongo'), and Te Atua-reretahi ('The God-of-one-flight').

At this time, Ngāti Tūwharetoa had already gained control of the northern and eastern coasts of Lake Taupō from Ngāti Kurapoto and Ngāti Hotu in the course of the Ngāti Tūwharetoa invasion of Taupō. One of their ariki, Rua-wehea, who was a grandson of Tūwharetoa and lived at Whaka-uenuku at Karangahape, had built up a great deal of mana and therefore was able to establish himself as the overlord of Ngāti Tama. He exercised this position in an arrogant manner – whenever he encountered Ngāti Tama while travelling in his canoe, he would blow his pūkāeaea (bush falcon trumpet) and shout out curses, "Cooked heads! Your brains, your brains!" or "Your brains, your brains! Prepare food for me!" Every time this happened, Ngāti Tama had to have food ready for him as soon as he landed.

== Course of the war ==
=== Massacre at Whanganui ===
After about a year, Te Atua-reretahi met with Poutū-te-rangi, a chief of Ngāti Raukawa, who resided at Manukueke on the west coast of Taupō or at Maraeroa in the Hauhangaroa Range west of Taupō. When Poutū heard how Rua-wehea treated the people of Ngāti Tama, he advised that they should kill him and gave Te Atua-reretahi a whale-bone mere called Paroparo-humeia with which to do the deed.

The next time that Rua-wehea came to visit the Ngāti Tama at Whanganui, blowing on his pū kāeaea, they burnt some weeds, so that he would think that food had been prepared for him, then they welcomed him onto their marae, and led him into a house with a low doorway, where Rongo-hape was waiting at the window, Rongo-haua at the centre of the room, and Te Atua-reretahi at the back of the room or hiding behind the door. As Rua-wehea bent over to go through the door, Te Atua-reretahi grabbed him, saying "Man with Rongomaiwhiti, strike!". They killed Rua-wehea and all of his companions, except for a young boy, Te Rangi-ita, who escaped. Ngāti Tama cooked and ate some of the victims immediately, but the rest were hung up on ropes under the waterfall at Hingarae. According to Samuel Locke, Rua-wehea's slave escaped from the massacre and told Tūwharetoa what had happened. According to Hoeta Te Hata, it was not a slave, but Te Rangi-ita who brought the news. When Tuwharetoa visited Ngati Tama, they denied all knowledge and suggested that his canoe might have capsized, but they found his body hung up at Hingarae and worked out what had happened from the head wound. Pei Te Hurinui Jones says that the rope holding up the body of Rua-wehea broke during the night and his corpse drifted out onto the lake, where it was found by a canoe of Tūwharetoa.

=== Attack on Keri-tāne ===
Rua-wehea's cousin, Waikari, who was also an ariki of Ngāti Tūwharetoa, gathered all the hapū of Tūwharetoa, at his base on Motu-o-puhi island on Lake Rotoaira, just south of the southern end of Lake Taupō. After performing the peruperu war dance, the assembled chiefs agreed that Ngāti Tama must be destroyed in revenge. Waikari made a special effort to recruit a great warrior called Tūmata-ngaua. Once all the forces were gathered, he led a war party of 800 men to attack the main Ngāti Tama village, Keri-tāne, located on the north bank of the Waihāhā River, where it flows into Lake Taupō.

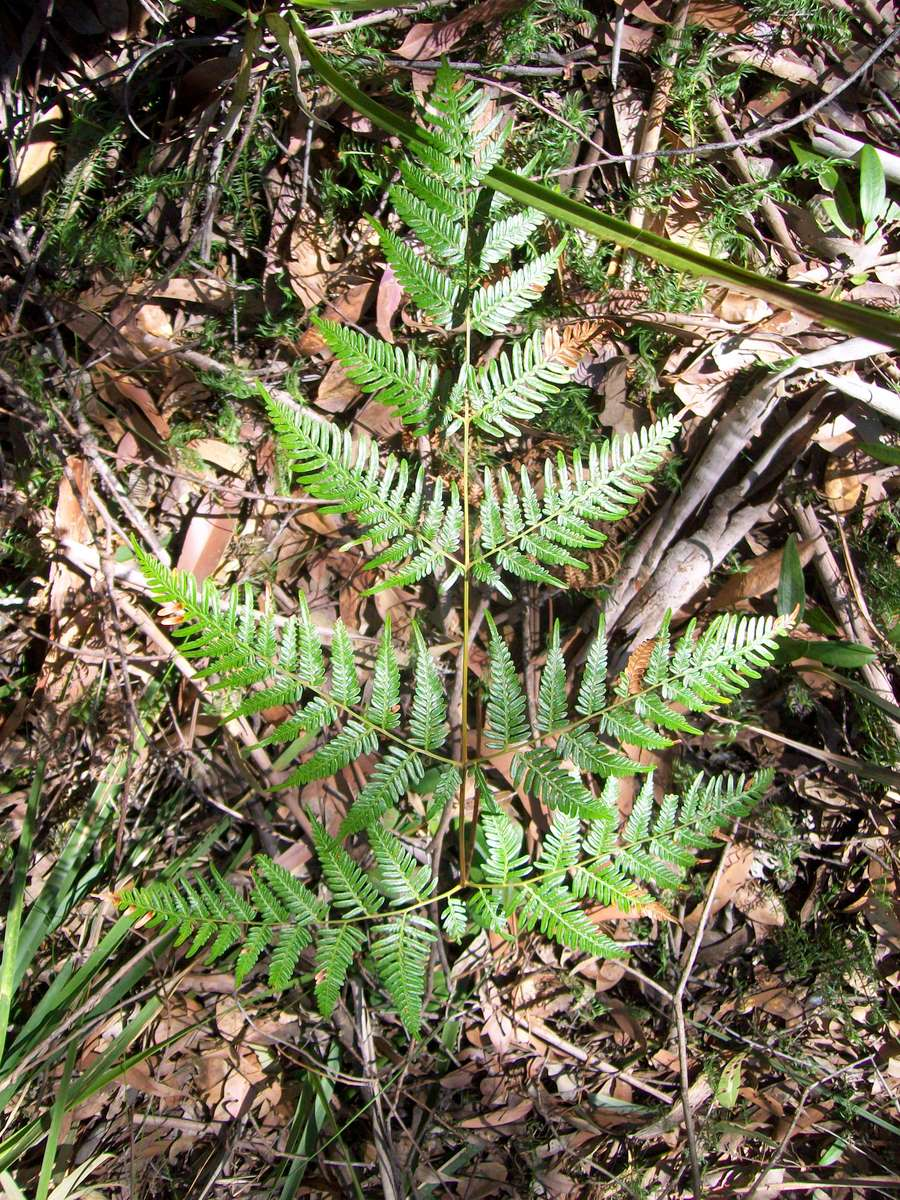
Bracken fern, whose roots are harvested to make aruhe.

The Tūwharetoa forces marched by night to Whaka-uenuku above the Karangahape cliffs at the south end of Lake Taupō at Kuratau. When they got there, they cooked up some pepe aruhe (small cakes made of fern root). Since Tūmata-ngaua had no food of his own, Waikari gave his cake to him. The forces then travelled by canoe under the cover of darkness until they reached the coast just south of the Waihāhā River.

Tūmata-ngaua was sent to sneak into Keri-tāne and scout it out while it was still dark. Aware that an attack would be forthcoming, Ngāti Tama had gathered at Keri-tāne to renew the fortifications. As Tūmata-ngaua snuck through the village, he made a special effort to identify Roroihape, the famously beautiful daughter of the rangatira Rongo-hape.

At dawn the next morning, the Tūwharetoa forces attacked Keri-tāne and slaughtered many of Ngāti Tama without a fight, including Rongo-hauā and Te Atua-reretahi. While the fighting was going on Rongo-hape made a break for it, fleeing towards where the Tūwharetoa canoes were tied up. The only one who had been left to look after the canoes was the young boy Te Rangi-ita, the sole survivor of the massacre at Whanganui. When Rongo-hape reached the canoes he jumped from the shore, but missed his landing and fell into the water. Te Rangi-ita grabbed a paddle and whacked him over the head as he surfaced, killing him, and earning himself a reputation for prowess.

Every warrior of Tūwharetoa who had captured a woman during the fighting believed himself to have captured the maiden Roroihape, but in fact Tūmata-ngaua had grabbed her, because only he knew what she looked like. According to Pei Te Hurinui Jones, he handed her over to Waikari, who took her as his own wife. Many great Tūwharetoa chiefs were descended from the pair. It is proverbial, when they boast of their lineage, for people to respond by saying "Atā! You are nothing! Paid for with a bundle of fernroot!" (referring to Waikari's gift of fernroot to Tūmata-ngaua), to which they customarily respond, "The price of a real treasure!"

Following this, the Tūwharetoa also attacked the Ngāti Tama fortress at Purukete, which is the origin of the proverb "Aue, mate, he mate wareware te kite au i o Purukete" ("Oh! Death, an unknown death, if only I could have seen Puru-kete!"), in reference to the face that Rua-wehea was not eaten.

Those Ngāti Tama who were not killed at Keri-tāne fled, stopping first at Orakei Korako and Ātiamuri, before settling at Motu-whanake, near Ohakuri. Henceforth, the western coast of Taupō was under Tūwharetoa control.

=== Attack on Manu-kueke ===
Having defeated Ngāti Tama, Tūwharetoa also desired vengeance on Poutū and Ngāti Raukawa for having instigated the murder of Rua-wehea. Therefore, they swept down and attacked Manu-kueke, which was located in the area of the Karangahape cliffs, defeated his forces, and killed Poutū himself.

== Aftermath ==
The death of Poutū was subsequently avenged by Te Ata-inutai, who led a raid on the Tauranga Taupō region. He killed Waikari at Koro-tanuku, but at Whakāngiangi, he was wounded by Te Rangi-ita and made peace with Tūwharetoa by marrying his daughter Waitapu to him. The war thus marked the end of Tainui's claims to the territories on the western coast of Taupō, but most hapū of Tūwharetoa are now descendants of Tainui through Waitapu.

In turn, Kewha avenged the death of Waikari by assassinating Te Ata-inutai in his old age. Te Ata-inutai's grandson Tū-te-tawhā and his relative Whiti-patatō avenged that death by leading an attack on the village of Tūwharetoa a Turiroa. Cornered by Whiti-patatō, Tūwharetoa a Turiroa handed over the mere, Paroparo-houmeia, which had originally been given to Te Atua-reretahi to kill Rua-wehea and had subsequently come into his possession, and allowed Whiti-patatō to kill him with it. This ended the cycle of revenge sparked off by the murder of Rua-wehea.

== Sources ==
The earliest preserved accounts of the conflict are given by John White in his unpublished volume on the history of Te Arawa, which he composed between 1879 and his death in 1891, and by Samuel Locke in 1882, as part of an accumulated record of Māori traditions from Taupō and the East Coast, which he says that he translated from written accounts produced by unnamed Māori tohunga. These two texts are nearly identical.

The war is also mentioned briefly in an article of 1904 by Walter Edward Gudgeon. Extended versions of the Tūwharetoa account are given by Hoeta Te Hata and John Te Herekiekie Grace. Pei Te Hurinui Jones gives a similar account based on an oral account which he heard from Tuturu Hōne Tere of Ngāti Tūwharetoa and Ngāti Raukawa descent.

== Bibliography ==
- White, John (1879–1891). "The Ancient HIstory of the Maori, his Mythology, and Traditions: Vol. 7: Te Arawa". nzetc.victoria.ac.nz.
- Locke, Samuel (1882). "Historical Traditions of Taupo and East Coast Tribes". Transactions and Proceedings of the Royal Society of New Zealand. 15: 433–459.
- Gudgeon, W. E. (1904). "The Toa Taua or Warrior". Journal of the Polynesian Society. 13: 238–264.
- Te Hata, Hoeta; Fletcher, H. J. (1916). "The Ngati-Tuharetoa occupation of Taupo-nui-a-tia". Journal of the Polynesian Society. 25: 150–162.
- Te Hata, Hoeta; Fletcher, H. J. (1917). "Ngati-Tuhare-toa occupation of Taupo-nui-a-tia". Journal of the Polynesian Society. 26: 19–30, 69–99, 180–187.
- Grace, John Te Herekiekie (1970) [1959]. Tuwharetoa: The history of the Maori people of the Taupo District. Auckland [N.Z.]: A.H. & A.W. Reed. ISBN 9780589003739.
- Jones, Pei Te Hurinui; Biggs, Bruce (2004). Ngā iwi o Tainui : nga koorero tuku iho a nga tuupuna = The traditional history of the Tainui people. Auckland [N.Z.]: Auckland University Press. ISBN 1869403312.
