= Te Ata-inutai =

Māori rangatira (chieftain)

Te Ata-inutai was a Māori rangatira (chieftain) of the Ngāti Raukawa iwi in the Tainui tribal confederation based at Whare-puhunga in the Waikato region of New Zealand. He led an attack against Ngāti Tūwharetoa on the south shore of Lake Taupō, as a result of disputes arising from the Ngāti Tama–Ngāti Tūwharetoa War and forged a peace treaty with the Tūwharetoa chieftain Te Rangi-ita, but was ultimately murdered in his old age by members of Tūwharetoa in vengeance for his earlier attack. He probably lived in the early seventeenth century.

== Life ==
Locations in the life of Te Ata-inutai
1 Mount Whare-puhunga
2 Pōnui, Rangatira Point
3 Koro-tanuku and Whakāngiangi
4 Marae-kōwhai, near Mōkai
5 Mount Kakepuku
6 Waipapa

Te Ata-inutai was the son of Upoko-iti, a descendant of Raukawa and, through him, a direct descendant of Hoturoa, captain of the Tainui canoe. Upoko-iti participated in the Ngāti Raukawa–Ngāti Kahu-pungapunga War alongside his cousin Whaita and brothers Tama-te-hura, Wairangi, and Pipito, in which Ngāti Raukawa conquered the stretch of the Waikato River between Maungatautari and Ātiamuri. When he became an adult, Te Ata-inutai made his own base at Mount Whare-puhunga.

=== Attack on Tūwharetoa ===
During the Ngāti Tama–Ngāti Tūwharetoa War the Ngāti Tūwharetoa ariki, Waikari had attacked and killed the Ngāti Raukawa rangatira Poutū, who was a cousin of Te Ata-inutai. Te Ata-inutai gathered a war party in order to get revenge for this killing. He led the war party down the Waikato River, along the east coast of Lake Taupō. At Rangatira Point, they attacked the fortress of Pōnui, where they killed a lady called Hine-te-ao, but her husband Tūwharetoa a Turiroa eluded them and made it to Whakāngiangi, where he warned Ngāti Tūwharetoa of the invasion. Te Ata-inutai continued along the east coast of Taupō to Waikari's fortress at Koro-tanuku, on the north bank of the Tauranga Taupō River where it flows into Lake Taupō (modern Tauranga Taupō township). He took the fortress and killed all the people there, including Waikari.

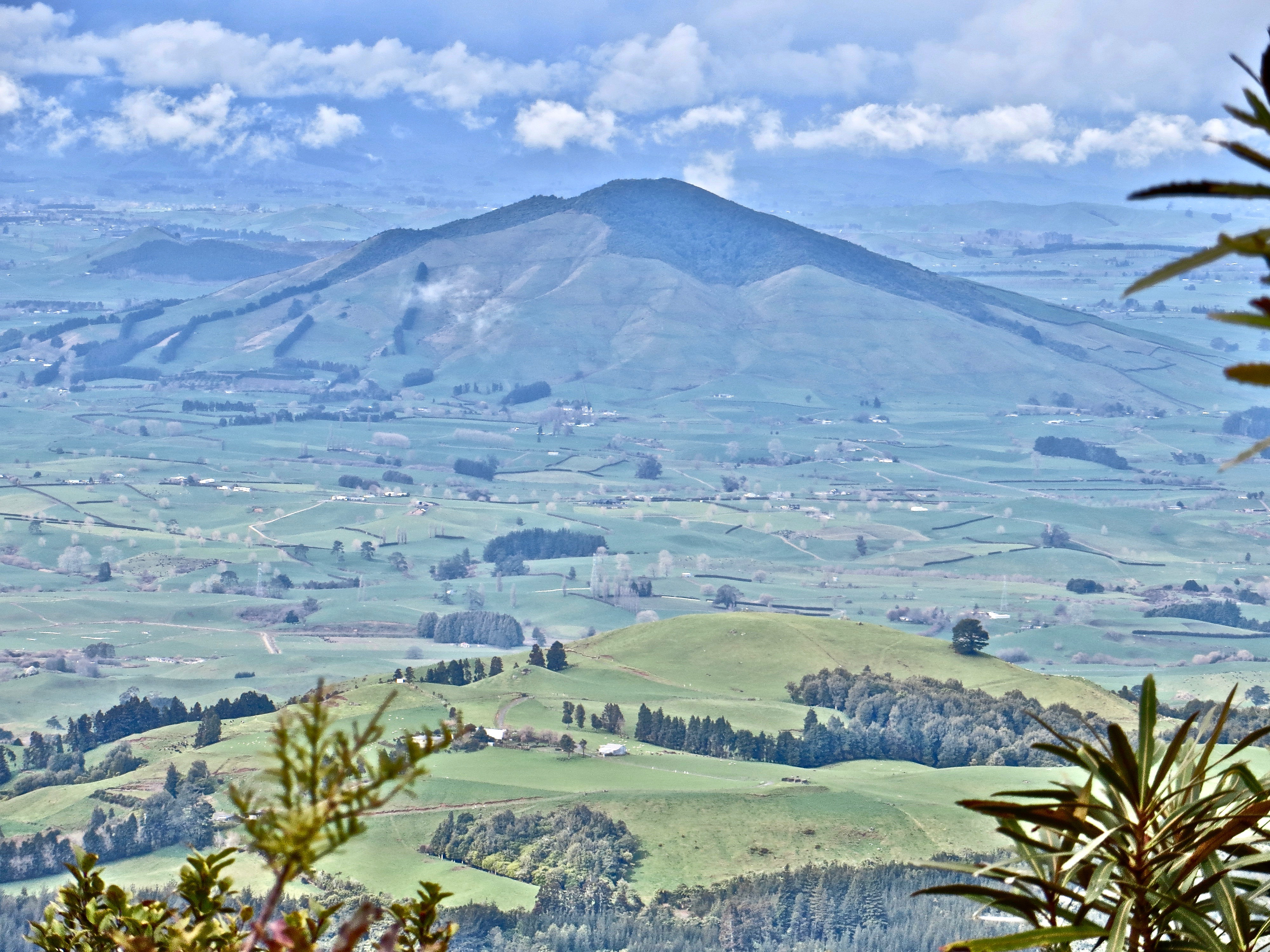
Mount Kakepuku.

Te Ata-inutai now came to Whakāngiangi (slightly further east, near modern Te Rangiita township), where most of the Tūwharetoa warriors had gathered under the command of Te Rangi-ita and Tūmata-ngaua. Te Ata-inutai's forces attacked the fort, but its defences were too strong for them, so they settled into a siege. During the siege, Te Ata-inutai was struck by a spear made of mānuka wood and wounded. He shouted up to the defenders, asking who had hit him, and one Te Rangi-ita revealed that he had done it, Te Ata-inutai called him down and made peace with him. To seal the peace, Te Rangi-ita married Waitapu, daughter of Te Ata-inutai and his wife Te Kahu-rere-moa.

After this Te Ata-inutai returned to Mount Whaka-puhunga, while Waitapu and Te Rangi-ita settled at Marae-kōwhai, north of Lake Taupō, near Mōkai. The genealogical links (whakapapa) resulting from the marriage between Waitapu and Te Rangi-ita are recounted in a waiata by Peou, which is included in Āpirana Ngata and Pei Te Hurinui Jones' collection of waiata Nga Moteatea. Waikari's head was taken by the Ngāti Raukawa and was placed in the waters of Kāwā, near Mount Kakepuku to function as a mauri tuna (a talisman for attracting eels).

=== Death ===
For a long time, Te Rangi-ita and Waitapu had only daughters and as a result, Te Rangi-ita stopped visiting Waitapu. Therefore, according to Pei Te Hurinui Jones, she left Marae-kōwhai, travelling home to her father, who performed special karakia ('incantations') and told her that if she returned to Marae-kōwhai and had sex with Te Rangi-ita, she would bear a son, which is what happened. In Hoeta Te Hata's account, however, the rituals were carried out by a nameless tohunga (priest), Waitapu came home already pregnant, and Te Ata-inutai planned to kill his grandchild if it proved to be male, but Waitapu covered the baby's front and tricked him into believing that she had given birth to another daughter.

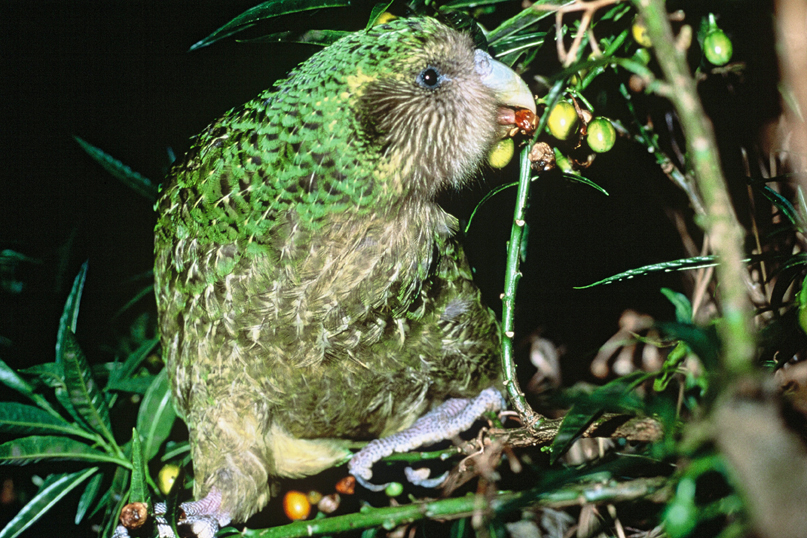
A kākāpō bird.

According to Pei Te Hurinui Jones, however, Waitapu's first son was born at Marae-kōwhai and, when Te Ata-inutai heard about it, he travelled there in order to perform the tohi baptismal ritual for the newborn, who was called Tama-mutu. On his way home, however, Te Ata-inutai was ambushed and killed at Waipapa, below the Pou-a-kani cliff by a war party of Ngāti Tūwharetoa led by a rangatira called Kewha (according to Pei Te Hurinui Jones), in revenge for the earlier deaths of Hine-te-ao and Waikari. Hoeta Te Hata says that the killer's name was Kūha and that the murder took place on the Mangakino Stream. According to him, Te Ata-inutai was taking his oldest granddaughter, Pare-kāwa, back to Marae-kōwhai.

Te Ata-inutai's head was taken to Maungawharau in the Kaimanawa Range where it was placed on a tree as a bird talisman for kākāpō. As a result, the place was named Te Iringa o te Upoko o Te Ata ('The hook of Te Ata's head').

For a long time, his death went unavenged, but eventually, his youngest grandson Tū-te-tawhā arranged for Whiti-patatō of Ngāti Raukawa to lead a war party that avenged the murder by attacking the Ngāti Tūwharetoa settlement of Tuhinga-mata.

== Sources ==
The earliest published account of Te Ata-inutai's life is included in a 1904 article by Walter Edward Gudgeon, with no indication of the sources on which it is based. A detailed account was given by Hoata Te Hata between 1916 and 1918. This account is followed closely by John Te Herekiekie Grace in his 1959 history of Tūwharetoa. F. L. Phillips gives an account in his 1989 book on Tainui historical geography, which he heard from Kahu Te Kuru of Ngāti Manunui. Pei Te Hurinui Jones gives a similar account, which he heard from Tuturu Hōne Tere of Ngāti Tūwharetoa and Ngāti Raukawa descent.

== Bibliography ==
- Gudgeon, W. E. (1904). "The Toa Taua or Warrior". Journal of the Polynesian Society. 13: 238–264.
- Te Hata, Hoeta; Fletcher, H. J. (1916). "The Ngati-Tuhare-toa occupation of Taupo-nui-a-tia". Journal of the Polynesian Society. 25 (99): 104–116, 150–62.
- Te Hata, Hoeta; Fletcher, H. J. (1917). "Ngati-Tuhare-toa occupation of Taupo-nui-a-tia". Journal of the Polynesian Society. 26: 19–30, 69–99, 180–187.
- Te Hata, Hoeta; Fletcher, H. J. (1918). "Ngati-Tuhare-toa occupation of Taupo-nui-a-tia". Journal of the Polynesian Society. 27: 38–46.
- Grace, John Te Herekiekie (1959). Tuwharetoa: The history of the Maori people of the Taupo District. Auckland [N.Z.]: A.H. & A.W. Reed.
- Ngata, Apriana; Te Hurinui, Pei (1961). Nga Moteatea: he maramara rere no nga waka maha. He mea kohikohi na A. T. Ngata. Na Pei Te Hurinui I whakapaakehaa, Part II. Wellington [N.Z.]: Polynesian Society.
- Phillips, F. L. (1989). Nga tohu a Tainui / Landmarks of Tainui: A Geographical Record of Tainui Traditional History. Otorohanga: Tohu Publishers.
- Jones, Pei Te Hurinui; Biggs, Bruce (2004). Ngā iwi o Tainui : nga koorero tuku iho a nga tuupuna = The traditional history of the Tainui people. Auckland [N.Z.]: Auckland University Press. ISBN 1869403312.
