= Tū-te-tawhā Whare-oneone =

Māori rangatira

Tū-te-tawhā Whare-oneone was a 17th-century Māori rangatira (chieftain) of Ngāti Tūwharetoa from the region around Lake Taupō, New Zealand. He arranged a raid in revenge for the murder of his maternal grandfather, Te Ata-inutai. He was a brave warrior, but also excessively proud and died when he led an ambitious but ill-conceived raid up the Waikato River to Cambridge. He probably lived in the mid-seventeenth century. He is the ancestor of the Ngāti Tutetawhā hapu of Ngāti Tūwharetoa.

== Life ==
Tū-te-tawhā was the youngest son of Te Rangi-ita and Waitapu. Through his father, Te Rangi-ita, he was a descendant of Tūwharetoa i te Aupōuri. He was named after his paternal grandfather, Tū-te-tawhā (sometimes referred to as Tū-te-tawhā I) and is referred to as Tū-te-tawhā Whare-oneone or Tū-te-tawhā II in order to distinguish him from him.

His mother was the daughter of Te Ata-inutai of Ngāti Raukawa, through whom he was a descendant of Hoturoa, captain of the Tainui canoe. His parents had been married as part of a peace agreement which ended an attack by Te Ata-inutai on Ngāti Tūwharetoa. He had four older sisters, Pare-kāwa, Te Uru-kaihina, Te Piunga-tai, and Tore-iti and three older brothers, Tama-mutu, Manu-nui, and Meremere. They all grew up at Marae-kōwhai, north of Lake Taupō, near Mōkai.

He is reported to have been a brave warrior, but also “quick tempered and obstinate” and unwilling to take advice from his older brothers. His taiaha spear was named Inaringa.

=== Avenging Te Ata-inutai ===
Locations in Whiti-patatō's campaign
1 Mount Whare-puhunga
2 Tīhoi
3 Marae-kōwhai (near Mokai)
4 Rangatira Point

When Tū-te-tawhā's eldest brother, Tama-mutu, was born, Te Ata-inutai travelled to Marae-kōwhai in order to perform the tohi baptismal ritual, but he was murdered by a group of Tūwharetoa led by Kewha on his journey home, as vengeance for his killing of the Tūwharetoa ariki Waikari during the attack that had led to the marriage of Te Rangi-ita and Waitapu.

Because this murder had not been avenged, Te Ata-inutai's name was not mentioned to his grandchildren. However, when Tū-te-tawhā was about twelve, an old man called Ure-tāraia, Te Urutaraia, or Ure-tarai was fishing with a net and the fish began to escape out the bottom. Tū-te-tawhā and other children threw rocks into the stream, in order to drive the fish back into the net. One of Tū-te-tawhā's stones splashed the old man in the face and he shouted abuse at Tū-te-tawhā, revealing that he had a grandfather whose death was unavenged. Tū-te-tawhā went to his mother, who revealed the identity of his grandfather and the truth of the old man's words.

Therefore, when he was an adult, Tū-te-tawhā travelled to his maternal grandfather's old home, Whare-puhunga, in the Waikato region, where he convinced the Ngāti Raukawa to gather a war party in order to avenge the death. This party was led by Whiti-patatō (or Whiti-patoto). Te Rangi-ita learnt that the war party was coming from Tū-te-tawhā and called on Whiti-patatō to lead his force to Marae-kōwhai quickly, but he stopped in the area of Kaingaroa, saying "Not yet! I am going to rove (tihoi) about this plain" or "my path must be a hidden one” (me tīhoi ake te huarahi mōku), from which the plain received the name Tīhoi.

Eventually, however, Whiti-patatō reached the settlement of Tuhinga-mata / Pōnui located near Rangatira Point at the northeastern end of Lake Taupō. In the night, Tū-te-tawhā entered the village and took a turn on sentry duty, singing out a song that cryptically communicated to Whiti-patatō that the local rangatira, Tūwharetoa a Turiroa was not in the village, but in a cave on the shore of Lake Taupō called Matanuku and Matarangi. Just before dawn the next morning, Whiti-patatō led his forces in an attack on Tuhinga-mata. The village was completely unprepared for an attack and the people broke and ran. Whiti-patatō went searching for Tūwharetoa a Turiroa, found him in the cave, and killed him, thus avenging Te Ata-inutai's death.

For his actions, Tū-te-tawhā received the sobriquet whare-oneone. After this, he settled at Rangatira Point, near the old village of Tūwhare-toa a Turiroa.

=== War with Werewere ===
Places in the life of Tū-te-tawhā
1 Rangatira Point
2 Lake Rotorua
3 Tuhua
4 Wai-tōtara / Pae-tōtara
5 Taumataiwi, Karapiro
6 Maunganamu, Tūrangi

Tū-te-tawhā's brother, Tama-mutu, led an expedition to Lake Rotorua to attack Te Roro-o-te-rangi of Te Arawa. Tū-te-tawhā joined the expedition and one of the captured women, Nga-waero, became his wife.

During the expedition, Werewere, son of Tūwharetoa a Turiroa, quarrelled with Tama-mutu, and afterwards he led a war party against him, along with Te Turuki and his son Te Teko. During this expedition Te Teko captured two of Tū-te-tawhā's wives, Raukato and Urututu. As a result, Tū-te-tawhā came in a canoe to Wharewaka, landed and asked Te Teko to return his wives; he returned Raukato, but had already given Urututu to one of his men as a wife. In thanks for the return of Raukato, Tū-te-tawhā left a kahu kurī (dog-skin cloak).

=== Visit to Tuhua ===
Tū-te-tawhā and his brother, Meremere, went to visit their sister Te Urukaihina at Tuhua, west of Taupō. When they arrived, Te Uru-kai-hina asked her husband which of the papa huahua (preserved birds) she should serve to the guests. He licked his finger and stuck it into the soot, so that it turned black, indicating that she should serve the mouldy papa huahua.

The next day, Tū-te-tawhā and Meremere set out home, but then Tū-te-tawhā declared that he had left his weapon in the village, went back, and killed Te Uru-kai-hina's husband. When he returned Meremere asked what had taken him so long and he revealed that he had murdered their host for serving them the mouldy food. Te Uru-kai-hina fled and was captured by Meremere, who asked Tū-te-tawhā why he had not killed her as well. He said "I left her so that she could weep for her husband."

=== Gift of Pare-kāwa ===
Tū-te-tawhā's eldest sister, Pare-kāwa, decided to honour him for having avenged the murder of Te Ata-inutai by presenting him with a giant pātua (package of preserved bird meat), which was called Waiariki. It was so big that it could not be transported in a single canoe, instead being transported on a platform slung between two canoes. Receiving this gift made Tū-te-tawhā "vain and boastful" and he decided to undertake military expeditions, convincing his brothers Manunui and Meremere to accompany him on raids down the Waikato River. He would point to his waka (canoe), Te Reporepo and say “Te Reporepo is rumbling!” (Kei te ngunguru a te Reporepo).

=== Attack on Waikato and death ===
The Ngāti Whakatere hapū of Ngāti Raukawa had come into conflict with Ngāti Mahuta and asked Tū-te-tawhā to come to their aid, so he decided to lead another war party down the Waikato River. For this expedition, he gathered his brothers Manunui and Meremere, as well as Te Tawhio-te-rangi and Nga Tokowaru of Ngāti Raukawa. Manu-nui encouraged Tū-te-tawhā to visit their elder brother, Tama-mutu, before setting out on the expedition, but Tū-te-tawhā refused, saying that they could visit him after they had returned victorious. When they launched their canoe, Te Reporepo, it hit a rock noisily and the bottom of the boat was cracked. Manu-nui and Meremere said that this was a bad omen, but Tū-te-tawhā insisted that it boded well.

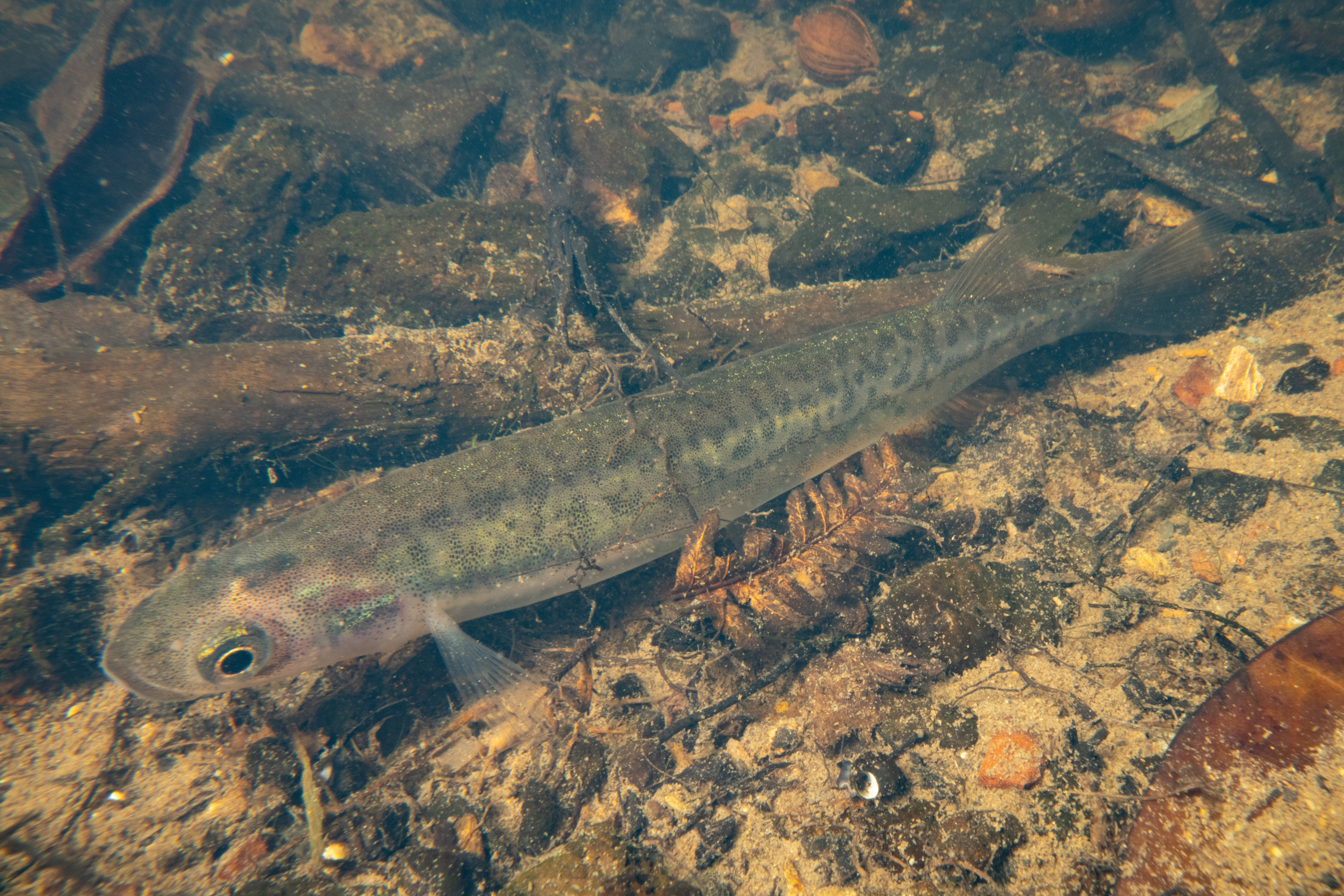
An īnanga.

The expedition was joined by forces from Ngāti Raukawa, and travelled downstream capturing villages, until they reached a place called Wai-tōtara or Pae-tōtara (near modern Cambridge). Here they were met by Tapauē and Whare-tīpeti of Ngāti Mahuta, leading a combined force from throughout Waikato Tainui. The other chiefs encouraged Tū-te-tawhā to fight the individual contingents of this force before they had time to gather together (“strike while the tide of Waikato is still low”), but he replied that "before the sun sets over Makaho, they shall be killed in their hundreds and thousands!" Makaho is a place on Lake Taupō, where īnanga were very common and one only needed to cast the net once in order to get a large haul, so Tū-te-tawhā's statement meant that he preferred to let the enemy forces gather so that they could all be defeated in one go.

When the battle began, Tapauē and Whare-tīpeti's forces ran away and Tū-te-tawhā's men pursued them along the bank to Taumataiwi, near Karapiro, where the majority of the Waikato forces were waiting to ambush them. Tū-te-tawhā fought in single combat with Tapauē's son, Te Putu, wounding him with his taiaha, but receiving a fatal blow in return from Te Putu's huata spear. Manu-nui and Meremere were also killed. The heads of the dead were hung on a whata or stage, as a result of which the place was named Te Rau-anga-anga (“The hundred heads”).

Nga Tokowaru was captured alive. According to the Tūwharetoa tradition recounted by Hoeta Te Hata and John Te Herekiekie Grace, he was brought before his captors and they asked him to display his skill with a tētē parāoa (whalebone short spear). When he had been doing this for some time, he asked who had killed Tū-te-tawhā. Te Putu stood up and Nga Tokowaru leapt at him without warning, knocking him to the ground where he slashed open his stomach and stabbed him repeatedly, letting Te Putu's blood flow all over him. He was killed, but by covering himself in the blood of their own chief, Te Putu, he had made himself tapu, so Ngāti Mahuta did not eat him.

According to a Tainui tradition, recounted by Wahanui in 1890, Nga Tokowaru had snapped off the whalebone spike of his spear and hidden it under his cloak when he was captured. As Ngāti Mahuta were preparing the oven for cooking him, he asked to speak with Te Putu, who came over. As they performed the hongi, Ng Tokowaru pulled out the spike and slashed open Te Putu's throat and stomach, saying "Behold the parting gift of Nga Tokowaru." Then he smeared Te Putu's blood all over his body, so that Ngāti Mahuta could not eat him. Instead they killed him and cremated his body. Nga Tokowaru's tētē was kept and was in the possession of Te Putu's descendant, Tawhiao, the first Māori King, as of 1890.

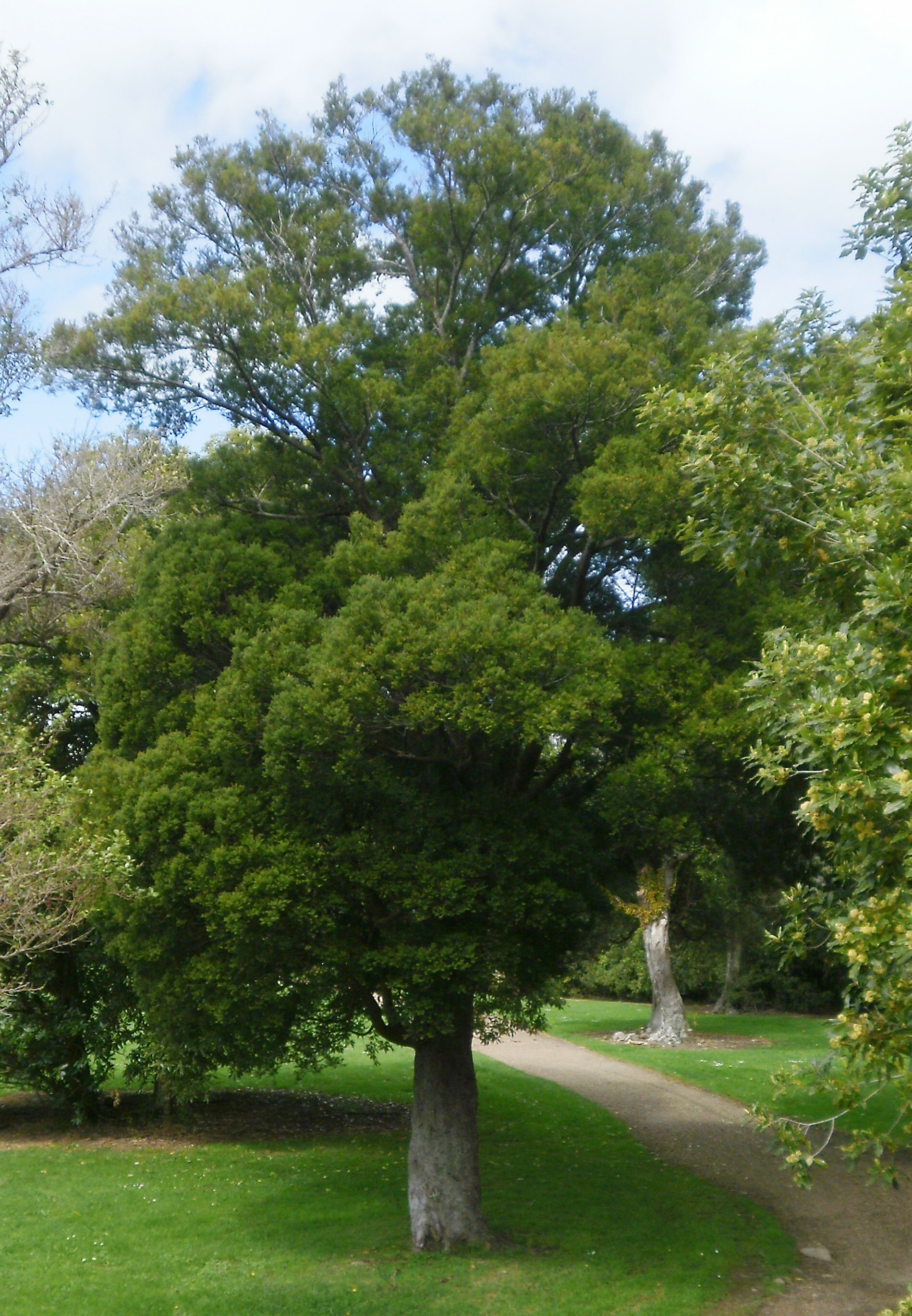
A toromiro tree.

According to the Tainui tradition recounted by Pei Te Hurinui Jones, the remainder of the Ngāti Tūwharetoa expedition were allowed to return home with Tū-te-tawhā's head and his taiaha. However, Tūwharetoa tradition says Tū-te-tawhā's head was kept at Kawaha for a long time until Te Iwi-tua-roa brought it back and buried it in Te Akore Cave on Maunganamu. As of 1917, there was a toromiro tree at Honotaka that was named Te Iwi-tua-roa in honour of this deed.

== Family ==
Tū-te-tawhā married Nga-waero, who was captured during Tama-mutu's expedition to Lake Rotorua to attack Te Roro-o-te-rangi. They had a son, Te Umu. He also married Raukato and Urututu.

The Ngāti Tutetawhā hapu of Ngāti Tūwharetoa is descended from Tū-te-tawhā. It currently makes use of Waitahanui Bridge marae and Akuhata wharenui at Waitahanui.

== Sources ==
The earliest published account of Tū-te-tawhā's life occurs in a 1904 article by Walter Edward Gudgeon, with no indication of the sources on which it is based. A detailed account appears in a series of articles by Hata Te Hata between 1916 and 1918. Much of this account is followed by John Te Herekiekie Grace in his 1959 history of Tūwharetoa. Pei Te Hurinui Jones also gives a similar account, which he heard from Tuturu Hōne Tere of Ngāti Tūwharetoa and Ngāti Raukawa descent.

== Bibliography ==
- Locke, Samuel (1882). "Historical Traditions of Taupo and East Coast Tribes". Transactions and Proceedings of the Royal Society of New Zealand. 15: 433–459.
- Gudgeon, W. E. (1904). "The Toa Taua or Warrior". Journal of the Polynesian Society. 13: 238–264.
- Te Hata, Hoeta; Fletcher, H. J. (1916). "Ngati-Tuhare-toa occupation of Taupo-nui-a-tia". Journal of the Polynesian Society. 25: 104–116, 150–162.
- Te Hata, Hoeta; Fletcher, H. J. (1917). "Ngati-Tuhare-toa occupation of Taupo-nui-a-tia". Journal of the Polynesian Society. 26: 19–30, 69–99, 180–187.
- Te Hata, Hoeta; Fletcher, H. J. (1918). "Ngati-Tuhare-toa occupation of Taupo-nui-a-tia". Journal of the Polynesian Society. 27: 38–46.
- Grace, John Te Herekiekie (1959). Tuwharetoa: The history of the Maori people of the Taupo District. Auckland [N.Z.]: A.H. & A.W. Reed.
- Ngata, Apriana; Te Hurinui, Pei (1961). Nga Moteatea: he maramara rere no nga waka maha. He mea kohikohi na A. T. Ngata. Na Pei Te Hurinui I whakapaakehaa, Part II. Wellington [N.Z.]: Polynesian Society.
- Phillips, F. L. (1989). Nga tohu a Tainui / Landmarks of Tainui: A Geographical Record of Tainui Traditional History. Otorohanga: Tohu Publishers.
- Jones, Pei Te Hurinui; Biggs, Bruce (2004). Ngā iwi o Tainui : nga koorero tuku iho a nga tuupuna = The traditional history of the Tainui people. Auckland [N.Z.]: Auckland University Press. ISBN 1869403312.
