= Waikari (Ngāti Tūwharetoa) =

Māori ariki or rangatira (chieftain)

Waikari was a 17th-century Māori ariki or rangatira (chieftain) of Ngāti Tūwharetoa from the region around Lake Taupō, New Zealand. He was one of the leaders in the Ngāti Tūwharetoa invasion of Taupō, fighting against Ngāti Kurapoto and Ngāti Hotu, and Subsequently, he led an attack on Ngāti Apa, who were settled on Lake Rotoaira and was the main leader in the Ngāti Tama-Ngāti Tūwharetoa War, which marked the final consolidation of Tūwharetoa control over the whole of Lake Taupō. He was killed by Ngāti Raukawa rangatira Te Ata-inutai. He probably lived in the late sixteenth and early seventeenth centuries.

== Life ==
Waikari's journey in the war on Ngāti Kurapoto.
1 Kawerau
2 Mount Tauhara
3 Waipahihi
4 Wharewaka
5 Lake Rotongaio and Tara-o-te-Marama
6 Motu-o-puhi, Lake Rotoaira

Waikari was the son of Rongo-patuiwi and through him a great-grandson of Tūwharetoa i te Aupōuri, the founder of Ngāti Tūwharetoa.

=== War with Ngāti Kurapoto ===
After a woman of Ngāti Kurapoto argued with a war party of Ngāti Tūwharetoa and uttered curses against Tūwharetoa and his ancestors, the elderly Tūwharetoa sent his sons and grandchildren from Kawerau on the Bay of Plenty to attack Ngāti Kurapoto. The force marched inland to the Waikato River, then continued to Takapau, where they split into two war parties.

According to Samuel Locke, Waikari accompanied his father Rongo-Patuiwi and his cousin Taringa in a war party which passed through Aputahou, Mount Tauhara, Waipahihi and Wharewaka, then south along the shore of Lake Taupō to Lake Rotongaio. There they encountered a tohunga called Kurimanga, whom they killed and cooked in an oven, leading the place to be named Umu-kuri ('Kuri's oven'). The next day, they attacked the fortresses of Tara-o-te-Marama and Pa-powhatu, killing many Ngāti Kurapoto, but allowing the rest to flee towards Hawke's Bay.

In Hoeta Te Hata's account of these events, the force was led by Rākei-poho and Taringa and Waikari is not mentioned. He says that they besieged Tara-o-te-Marama, but were unable to take it, so they made peace and offered a sacrifice of seventy dogs as compensation for eating Hine-kaharoa's fern root, thereby giving rise to the name Umu-kuri ('dogs' oven').

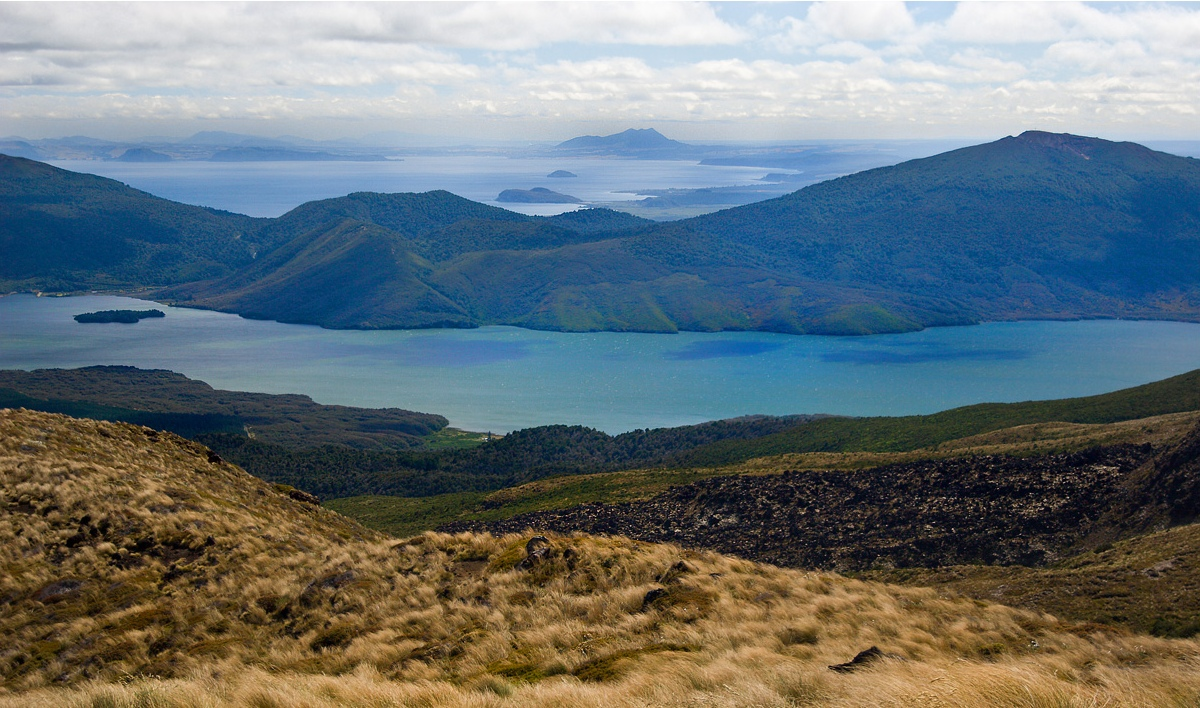
View looking down on Lake Rotoaira from the south. Motu-o-puhi island is at left and Pihanga is at right. Lake Taupō is at the top of the picture.

Both sources agree that Waikari and other Ngāti Tūwharetoa settled in on the shores of Taupō. Waikari made his base at Motu-o-puhi, an island in Lake Rotoaira, which is just south of the southern end of Lake Taupo.

=== War with Ngāti Hotu ===
According to Locke, Ngāti Hotu attempted to massacre a group of Tūwharetoa men led by Rorotaka, Puteketeke, and Taumaihi at Motiti, after which the members of Ngāti Tūwharetoa who were settled around Taupō gathered a force and attacked Ngāti Hotu. Waikari was sent to collect additional forces from Ngāti Tūwharetoa based at Kawerau, Awa o te atua, and Whakatāne. He returned to Taupō with a war party, sharing command of it with Tūtewero. They also brought the atua ('god') Rongomai with them.

When they had all mustered, the forces separated and Waikari led one party, which captured the fortress of Ngau-i-taua and killed all of the inhabitants. After this conflict, Ngāti Hotu were expelled from the Taupō region, fleeing to Tuhua and Whanganui.

=== War with Ngāti Apa ===
Waikari married his daughter Hinemihi to his cousin Matangikaiawha, who was a son of Umu-ariki of Ngāti Tūwharetoa and Kahu-pounamu of Ngāti Apa and was in charge of a village of Ngāti Apa on Lake Rotoaira, called Orangi-te-taea. While Waikari was fighting with Ngāti Hotu, Matangikaiawha attacked Hinemihi, nearly killing her. She escaped to Waikari's house at Horohenuku and went on from there to Kaiawatea, where she met her father and told him what had happened. Together with Turangitukua, his son Te Iwikinakia, and Kuha, Waikari gathered a war party and led it to Orangi-te-taea. Its fortifications were too strong to take by assault, so he placed it under siege.

During this siege, the brothers Tū-te-tawhā and Te Rapuhora, who were cousins of Waikari, visited Orangi-te-taea and were killed by Umu-ariki and Miromiro. After this, Ngāti Apa decided that their position was unsustainable, so they fled Orangi-te-taea in the night, leaving their fires burning so that Ngāti Tūwharetoa would not realise they were gone. In the morning, Waikari and his forces entered the village and found only a single old woman there, who told them that the various rangatira had departed in different directions: Takapumanuka, Miromiro, and Umu-ariki to Tarawera; Matangikaiawha to Moerangi below Mount Kakaramea, and others to Rangitīkei.

They decided to chase Matangikaiawha, who was heading towards Moerangi, where they caught up with him and Te Iwikinakia killed him. Te Rehu, the infant son of Matangikaiawha and Hinemihi was not killed, at Hinemihi's request. Instead he was adopted by Te Iwikinakia, whom he would later kill in revenge for Matangikaiawha's death. The whole party went back to Te Orangi-te-taea to conduct purificatory rites for Tū-te-tawhā and Te Rapuhora.

=== Ngāti Tama-Ngāti Tūwharetoa War ===
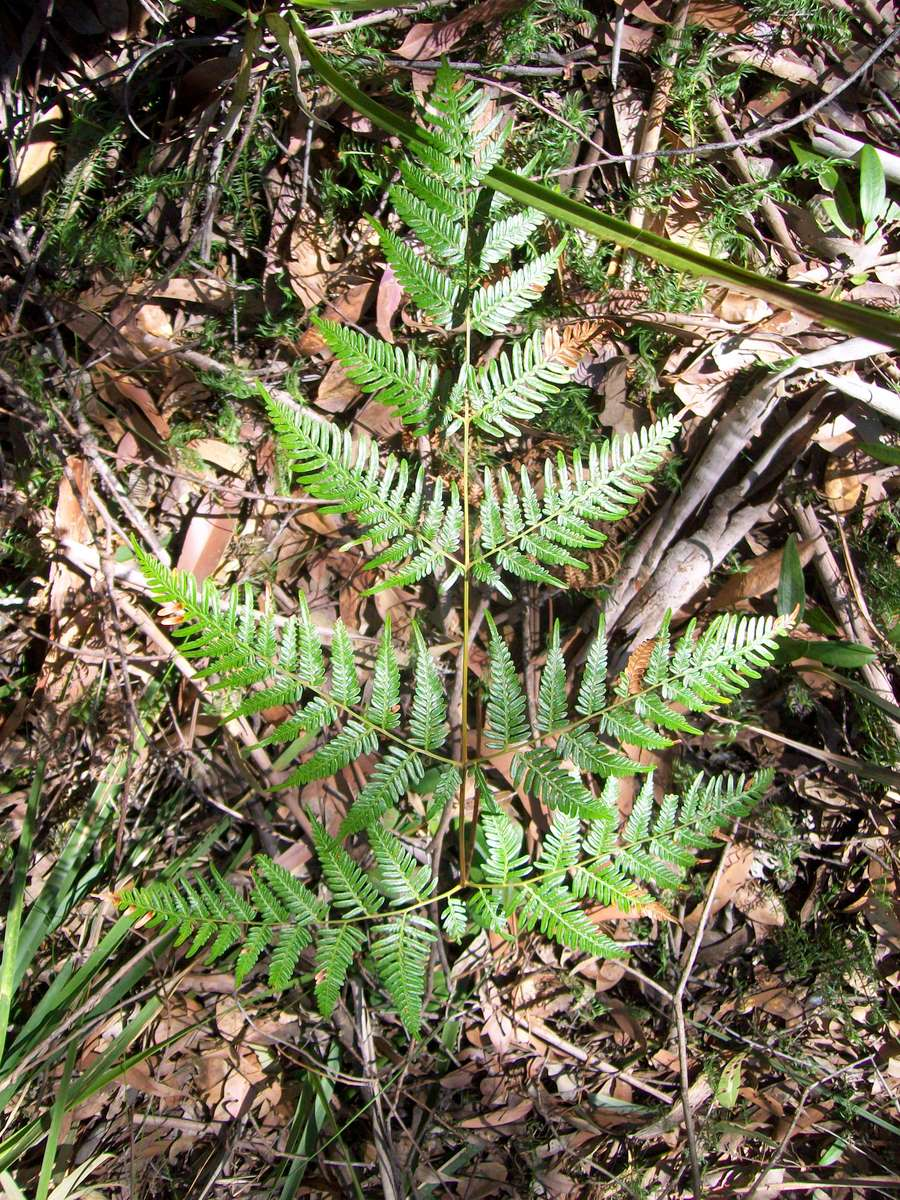
Bracken fern, whose roots are harvested to make aruhe.

Another war was sparked when Rongo-hauā, Rongo-hape, and Te Atua-reretahi, three rangatira from the Ngāti Tama iwi of Te Arawa, who had settled on the western coast of Taupō, murdered the Tūwharetoa ariki Rua-wehea at Whanganui. Rua-wehea was a cousin of Waikari, so he gathered all the hapū of Tūwharetoa, at Motu-o-puhi. He made a special effort to recruit a great warrior called Tūmata-ngaua. Once all the forces were gathered, he led a war party of 800 men to attack the main Ngāti Tama village, Keri-tāne, located on the north bank of the Waihāhā River, where it flows into Lake Taupo.

The Tūwharetoa forces marched by night to Rua-wehea's base at Whaka-uenuku above the Karangahape cliffs at the south end of Lake Taupo, at Kuratau. When they got there, they cooked up some bundles of aruhe (fern roots). Since Tūmata-ngaua had no food of his own, Waikari gave his bundles to him. The forces then travelled by canoe under the cover of darkness until they reached the coast just south of the Waihāhā River.

Overnight, the forces paddled across the lake and at dawn the next morning, the Tūwharetoa forces attacked Keri-tāne and slaughtered many of Ngāti Tama without a fight. The remaining Ngāti Tama were expelled from the Taupō region and settled at Motu-whanake, near Ohakuri on the Waikato River.

Every warrior of Tūwharetoa who had captured a woman during the fighting believed himself to have captured the maiden Roroihape, but in fact Tūmata-ngaua had grabbed her, because he had scouted out the village of Keri-tāne the night before the attack and discovered what she looked like. According to Pei Te Hurinui Jones, he handed her over to Waikari, who took her as his own wife. Many great Tūwharetoa chiefs were descended from the pair. It is proverbial, when they boast of their lineage, for people to respond by saying "Atā! You are nothing! Paid for with a bundle of fernroot!" (referring to Waikari's gift of fernroot to Tūmata-ngaua), to which they customarily respond, "The price of a real treasure!"

=== Death ===
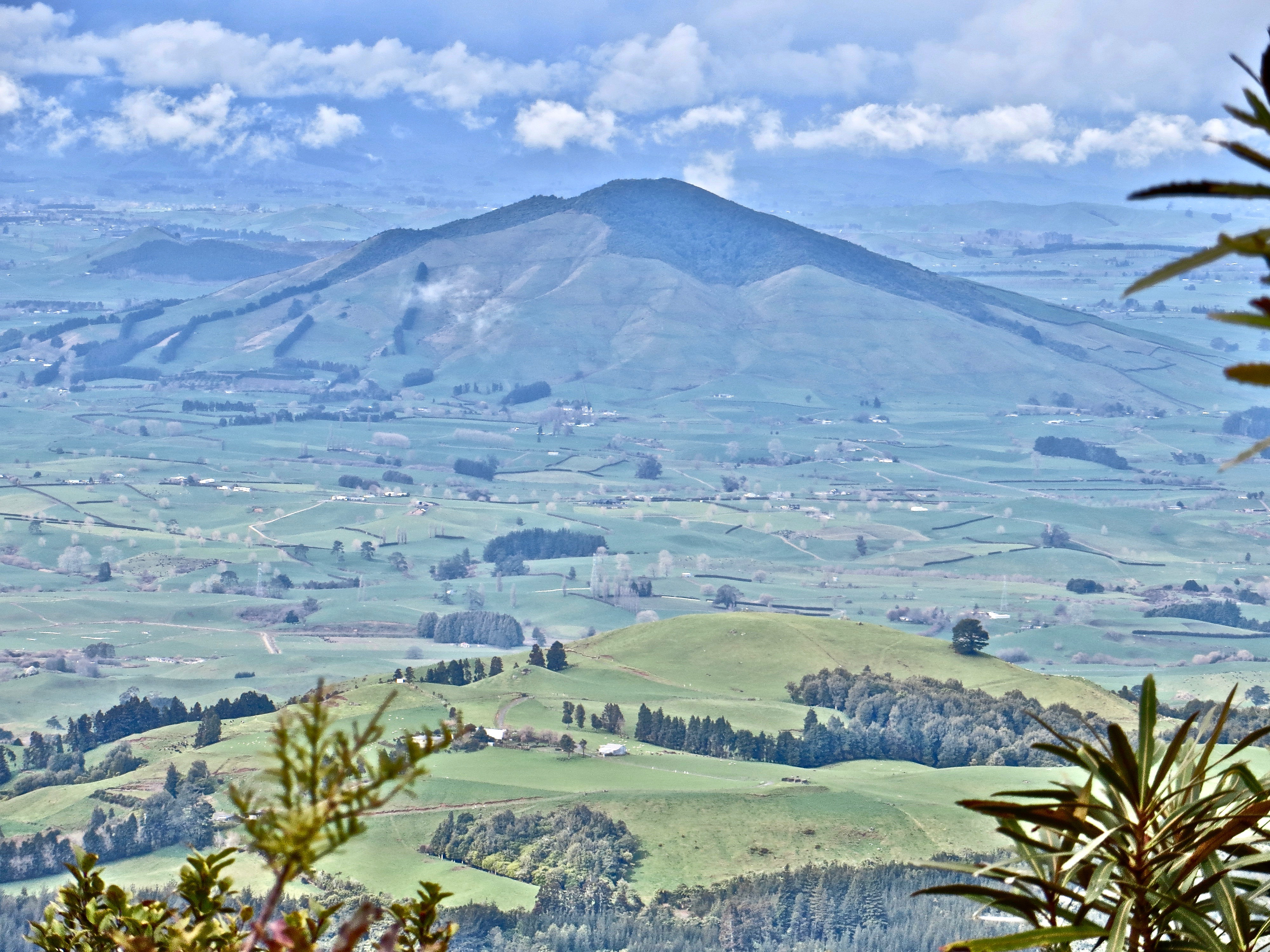
Mount Kakepuku.

After the attack on Keri-tāne, Tūwharetoa attacked and killed the Ngāti Raukawa rangatira Poutū at his base at Manu-kueke, in the area of the Karangahape cliffs, because he had encouraged the Ngāti Tama to murder Rua-wehea. Subsequently, the Ngāti Raukawa rangatira Te Ata-inutai led a raid into the region to get revenge for Poutū's death. Waikari died defending his fortress at Koro-tanuku, on the north bank of the Tauranga Taupō River where it flows into Lake Taupō (modern Tauranga Taupō township).

Waikari's head was taken by the Ngāti Raukawa and was placed in the waters of Kāwā, near Mount Kakepuku to function as a mauri tuna (a talisman for attracting eels). When Te Ata-inutai was an old man, a group of Ngāti Tūwharetoa led by Kewha or Kūha ambushed and killed him at Waipapa or the Mangakino Stream, in revenge for his killing of Waikari.

== Family ==
Waikari married Roroihape, the daughter of Rongo-hape of Ngāti Tama. They had three sons and a daughter:

- Papua
- Rakei-wairua
- Te Iwi-kinakia, killed by Te Rehu
- Hine-mihi, who married her cousin, the Ngāti Apa rangatira Matangikaiawha, son of Umu-ariki or Umu-ariki himself. and was the mother of Te Rehu.

== Sources ==
The earliest preserved account of Waikari's life is given by Samuel Locke in 1882, as part of an accumulated record of Māori traditions from Taupo and the East Coast, which he says he translated from written accounts produced by unnamed Māori tohunga. The attack on Keri-tāne is mentioned a 1904 article by Walter Edward Gudgeon. The Tūwharetoa account is given by Hoeta Te Hata and John Te Herekiekie Grace. Pei Te Hurinui Jones gives a similar account of the conflict with Ngāti Tama and Ngāti Raukawa, based on an oral account which he heard from Tuturu Hōne Tere of Ngāti Tūwharetoa and Ngāti Raukawa descent.

== Bibliography ==
- Locke, Samuel (1882). "Historical Traditions of Taupo and East Coast Tribes". Transactions and Proceedings of the Royal Society of New Zealand. 15: 433–459.
- Gudgeon, W. E. (1904). "The Toa Taua or Warrior". Journal of the Polynesian Society. 13: 238–264.
- Downes, T. W. (1909). "Early History of Rangitikei, and Notes on the Ngati Apa Tribe". Transactions of the New Zealand Institute. 42: 74–114.
- Te Hata, Hoeta; Fletcher, H. J. (1916). "Ngati-Tuhare-toa occupation of Taupo-nui-a-tia". Journal of the Polynesian Society. 25: 104–116, 150–162.
- Grace, John Te Herekiekie (1959). Tuwharetoa: The history of the Maori people of the Taupo District. Auckland [N.Z.]: A.H. & A.W. Reed.
- Jones, Pei Te Hurinui; Biggs, Bruce (2004). Ngā iwi o Tainui : nga koorero tuku iho a nga tuupuna = The traditional history of the Tainui people. Auckland [N.Z.]: Auckland University Press. ISBN 1869403312.
