= Te Rehu =

Māori ariki (chieftain)

Places in the life of Te Rehu.
1 Lake Rotoaira
2 Moerangi
3 Tauranga Taupō
4 Mōkai Pātea
5 Kirimana

Te Rehu was a 17th-century Māori ariki (chieftain) of Ngāti Tūwharetoa and Ngāti Apa from the region around Lake Taupō, New Zealand.

== Life ==
Te Rehu was born at Orangi-te-taea on Lake Rotoaira. His father was Matangikaiawha, a descendent of Tūwharetoa i te Aupōuri, the founder of Ngāti Tūwharetoa and from Ngāti Apa. His mother was Hinemihi, daughter of Waikari, also a descendant of Tūwharetoa.

=== Revenge on Te Iwikinakia ===
When Te Rehu was young, Matangikaiawha severely beat Hine-mihi. Her father Waikari, gathered a force and attacked Ngāti Apa, eventually catching Matangikaiawha at Moerangi, where Waikari’s youngest son Te Iwikinakia killed him. Hine-mihi interceded on behalf of Te Rehu, and he was taken in by Te Iwikinakia, who raised him as a son at Tauranga Taupō.

As Te Rehu was growing up, he learnt that Te Iwikinakia had murdered his father and eventually he resolved to get revenge. Therefore, he travelled to Mōkai Pātea to form a war party. He was joined there by some of his Ngāti Apa relatives, as well as Tū-makau-rangi of Ngāti Whitikaupeka, who wanted revenge on Ngāti Tūwharetoa for the earlier Ngāti Tūwharetoa–Ngāti Whitikaupeka War.

They attacked Te Iwikinakia at Tauranga Taupō. Since he had not been expecting an attack, his village was almost entirely undefended and after a short while he was defeated. The attackers cooked him with his own kumara and ate him. Then Te Rehu settled at Tū-makau-rangi's fortress, Kirimana, which was located on the Moawhango River.

=== Death ===
Shortly after this, a war party of Ngāti Tūwharetoa attacked Kirimana in order to get revenge for the murder of Te Iwikinakia. Kirimana was on top of a high cliff, but they put it under siege and eventually captured it. The inhabitants of Kirimana tried to escape by jumping into the river, but most of them were not able to swim and drowned as they tried to cross the river – Te Rehu and Tū-makau-rangi among them.

The fall of Kirimana marked the final end of the conflict between Ngāti Tūwharetoa and Ngāti Whitikaupeka.

== Bibliography ==
- Downes, T. W. (1909). "Early History of Rangitikei, and Notes on the Ngati Apa Tribe". Transactions of the New Zealand Institute. 42: 74–114.
- Te Hata, Hoeta; Fletcher, H. J. (1916). "Ngati-Tuhare-toa occupation of Taupo-nui-a-tia". Journal of the Polynesian Society. 25: 104–116, 150–162.
- Grace, John Te Herekiekie (1959). Tuwharetoa: The history of the Maori people of the Taupo District. Auckland [N.Z.]: A.H. & A.W. Reed. ASIN B0007JE64K.
- Jones, Pei Te Hurinui; Biggs, Bruce (2004). Ngā iwi o Tainui : nga koorero tuku iho a nga tuupuna = The traditional history of the Tainui people. Auckland [N.Z.]: Auckland University Press. ISBN 1869403312.
