= Ngāti Tūwharetoa invasion of Taupō =

16th-century conflict in New Zealand

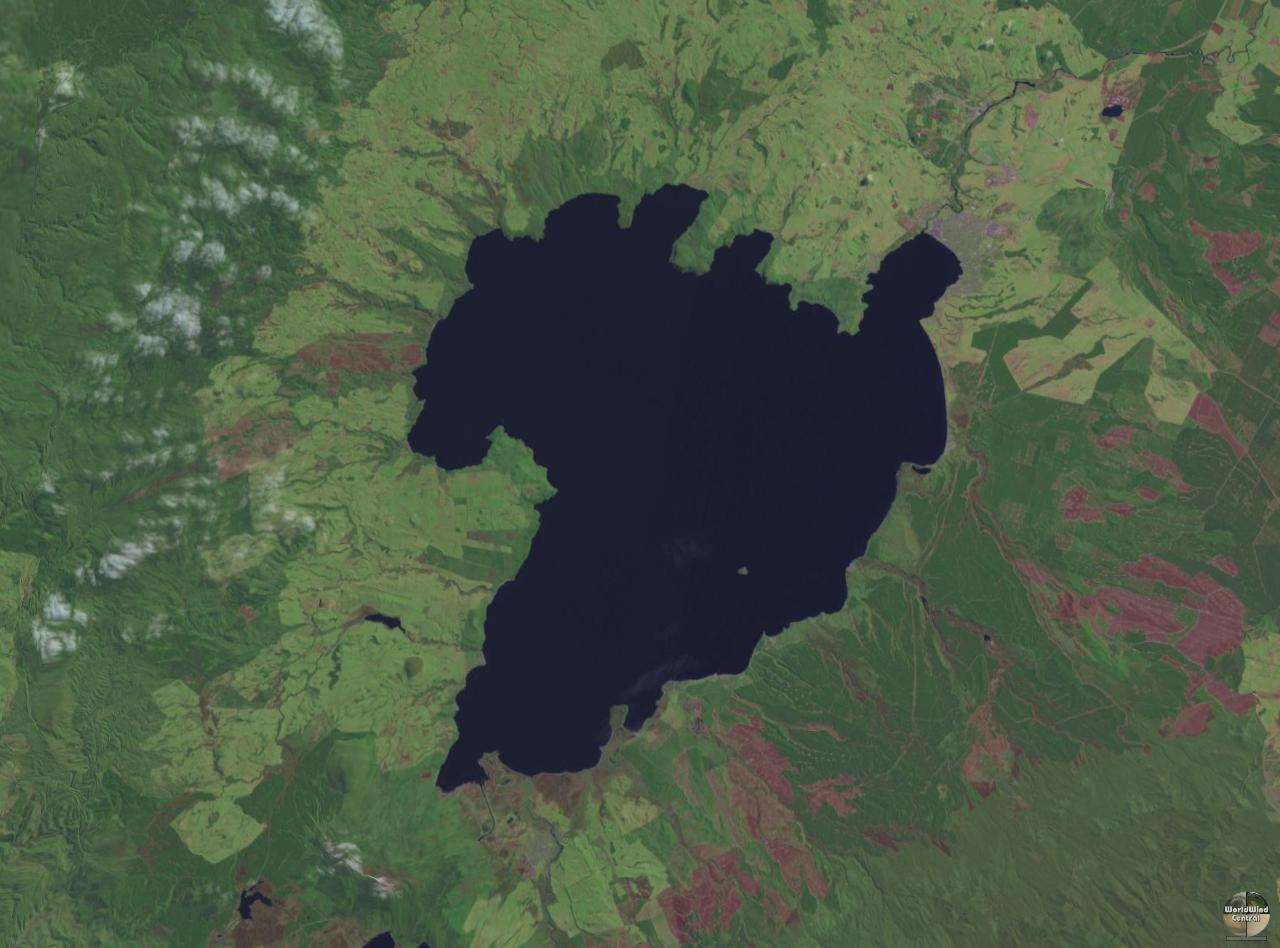
- Satellite image of Lake Taupō
Date	16th century
Location	Lake Taupō, New Zealand
Result	Ngāti Tūwharetoa victory: Ngāti Tūwharetoa gain the east coast of Lake Taupō

Belligerents
Ngāti Tūwharetoa	Ngāti Kurapoto; Ngāti Hotu

Commanders and leaders
Rongo-Patuiwi; Rākei-poho; Taringa; Waikari; Rereao; Tūtewero	Kurawaha; Tipapa-kereru; Paepaetehe

The Ngāti Tūwharetoa invasion of Taupō was a conflict which took place in the sixteenth century on the east coast of Lake Taupō in the central North Island of New Zealand. The conflict marks the beginning of Ngāti Tūwharetoa's expansion into the Taupō region. In response to an insult, Ngāti Tūwharetoa attacked Ngāti Kurapoto, based on the northeastern coast of Taupō. In the course of the conflict, Ngāti Tūwharetoa also attacked Ngāti Hotu at the south end of Lake Taupō. Different sources give diverging accounts on some details, but agree that the war ended with Ngāti Tūwharetoa in control of the whole eastern shore of Taupō. Ngāti Kurapoto was subsumed into Tūwharetoa, while Ngāti Hotu was wiped out, either in the course of the conflict or in a subsequent conflict. Tūwharetoa control of the west coast of the lake was established in the subsequent Ngāti Tama–Ngāti Tūwharetoa War.

== Origins ==
The first people to settle around Lake Taupō were Ngāti Hotu. Under the leadership of Kawhea, Hei-marama, and Rongomai-tuteaka, Ngāti Kurapoto, part of the Arawa tribal confederacy, invaded and seized the northern and eastern shores of the lake from Tupuae-haruru Bay (site of modern Taupō township) to Tauranga Taupō, leaving Ngāti Hotu with only the southern coast of the lake.

Ngāti Tūwharetoa, also part of the Arawa confederacy, and descendants of Ngātoro-i-rangi, one of the first two Māori to visit the Taupō region, were settled at this time in the Bay of Plenty region. After years of conflict Tūwharetoa and his ally Tūtewero son of Maruka had established control of a region encompassing Ōtamarākau, the Awa-o-te-atua (Tarawera River), and Kawerau. Tūwharetoa was by this point an elderly man, with many children and grandchildren.

=== Battles of Kaka-tarae ===
Places involved in the conflict's origins
1 Ōtamarākau
2 Mouth of Awa-o-te-atua (Tarawera River)
3 Kawerau
4 Kaka-tarae
5 Lake Rotongaio and Tara-o-te-Marama

Hatupere, leader of the Marangaranga or Maruiwi people, decided to attack Tūtewero, but was handily defeated by him and fled to Te Whaiti and the Kaweka Range. Ngāti Tūwharetoa were ashamed that this conflict had taken place without them, so Tūwharetoa's sons Rakahopukia, Rākei-poho, Rākei-makaha, Taniwha-paretuiri, and Rongomai-te-ngangana formed a war party of 240 men and attacked the Marangaranga / Maruiwi at Kaka-tarae near Runanga Lake. They suffered a terrible defeat. Only 140 men of Ngāti Tūwharetoa survived. Of the leaders, Rongomai-te-ngangana, and Rākei-poho or Matangi-kai-awha were killed. Moreover, there had been many women in the party, who were taken prisoner, notably Taniwha-pare-tuiri. Maruiwi and Pa-kaumoana took the dead to Purotu on the Mohaka River, where they were piled up in an oven and cooked, leading to the place names Whā-tihi ('pile up') and Umu-ariki ('oven of chieftains').

Locke reports that the tohunga, Takatore, performed a special ritual at Ahi-o-ngatāne, in which he killed a kiwi and offered half to the atua and half to Papatūānuku, the Tūwharetoa were able to avenge their defeat by a surprise attack on the Marangaranga at Rarauhi-papa, in which they captured the women back and killed around two hundred enemy men. Te Hata reports that the defeat at Kaka-tarae was avenged as a result of the makutu or whakanania ritual, in which an enemy warrior was captured, his heart was offered to the atua, and then the tohunga sang a karakia into a hole in the ground while naked. This ritual placed a curse on Maruwai, which caused them to drown in a river.

=== Curse of Hinekahoroa ===
According to Locke, as the Tūwharetoa were returning from this expedition, they travelled to Hinemaiaia on the coast of Lake Taupō, where they deposited their dead. Then they travelled north along the coast, past Maniaheke and Kowhaiataku to Lake Rotongaio, where they sounded their pū kaea trumpet to announce their presence to the Ngāti Kurapoto. This sound enraged the priestess Hine-kaho-roa shouted out the Pokokohua-ma (mummified heads curse), but the Tūwharetoa continued to blow the trumpet and shouted out, "Your brains, your brains!" (turning the curse back on her), and then she said, "I will make the bones of your ancestors Rangitu and Tangaroa like my fernroot" (i.e. treating them both as food).

According to Te Hata, the Tūwharetoa forces fleeing their defeat at Kakatare, came to Waiaruhe, a spring of the Wai-tahanui stream, east of Taupō. Finding fernroot there, they ate it all, not realising that it belonged to the priestess Hine-kaharoa. When she found out she angrily said "Leave the fernroot, the bones of Rangitu and Tangaroa."

Either way, the Tūwharetoa departed and reported what had happened to the old chief Tūwharetoa at Kawerau. A special sacred force was summoned to Kawerau by Tūwharetoa, who neutralised the curse by sacrificing a lizard, but now Tūwharetoa felt compelled to send an expedition against Ngāti Kurapoto to avenge the insult represented by the curse.

== Invasion of Taupō ==
Places in the war
1 Mount Tauhara
2 Waipahihi
3 Wharewaka
4 Lake Rotongaio and Tara-o-te-Marama
5 Tauranga Taupō
6 Motiti

The force marched inland to the Waikato River, then continued to Takapau, where they split into two war parties, one of which attacked Ngāti Kurapoto in the northeast and the other of which attacked Ngāti Hotu in the southeast. Locke and Te Hata give substantially different accounts of both of these attacks.

=== Attack on Ngāti Kurapoto ===
According to Locke, the party that invaded the northeast was led by Taniwha-paretuiri's son Rongo-Patuiwi, Rākei-poho's son Taringa, and Rongo-Patuiwi's son Waikari. They led their force past Aputahou and Mount Tauhara, coming to the shore of Lake Taupō at Waipahihi and Wharewaka, then travelled south to Lake Rotongaio, where they encountered a tohunga called Kurimanga, whom they killed and cooked in an oven, giving the place the name Umu-kuri ('Kuri's oven'). The next day they took the fortresses of Tara-o-te-Marama and Pa-powhatu, killing many Ngāti Kurapoto, but allowing the rest to flee towards Hawke's Bay. Locke mentions that some descendants of Kurapoto still existed as of 1882.

According to Te Hata, the force was led by Rākei-poho and Taringa and although they besieged Tara-o-te-Marama, they were unable to take it, so they made peace and offered a sacrifice of seventy dogs as compensation for eating Hine-kaharoa's fern root, thereby giving rise to the name Umu-kuri ('dogs' oven'). Te Hata says that the war party then carried on south down the coast to Toka-anu, without attacking any settlements. According to Te Hata, the surviving Ngāti Kurapoto remained in northeastern Taupō and intermarried with the Tūwharetoa settlers, gradually being subsumed into them.

The memory of Ngāti Kurapoto is maintained by the Tūwharetoa marae at Waipahihi, which is named Kurapoto.

=== Attack on Ngāti Hotu ===
Locke and Te Hata agree that the party which attacked the southeast was led by Rereao, a son of Tūwharetoa. According to Locke, he reached Lake Taupō at the Kotipu River, where the force encountered a woman called Monoao and killed her as a sacrifice. The party continued past Tuariki to Tauranga Taupō, where the Ngāti Hotu were living, along with some of the Ngāti Kurapoto. They fought a battle at Kanihinuhi, at which one rangatira was killed, and another, Kurawaha, was captured (He survived because Rereao's daughter, Ata-iwi-kura, interceded on his behalf and married him).

Rereao continued to One-mara-rangi and found that the Ngāti Hotu had gathered in a fortress at Kakapakia, which he attacked, killing two hundred men, including the rangatira Tipapa-kereru. An enormous oven was built, which was able to cook 140 of them at once – this "long oven of Rereao" became proverbial.

This was the end of Rereao's military campaign, but he continued travelling around, establishing tūāhu altars in order to take control of the land at Motiti, Te Kotuku-o, Rereao, Te Kowiti-o-Rereao, Te Pungarehu-o-Rereao, and Pukawa-o-Rereao, where he met up with the other war party.

=== Second attack on Ngāti Hotu ===
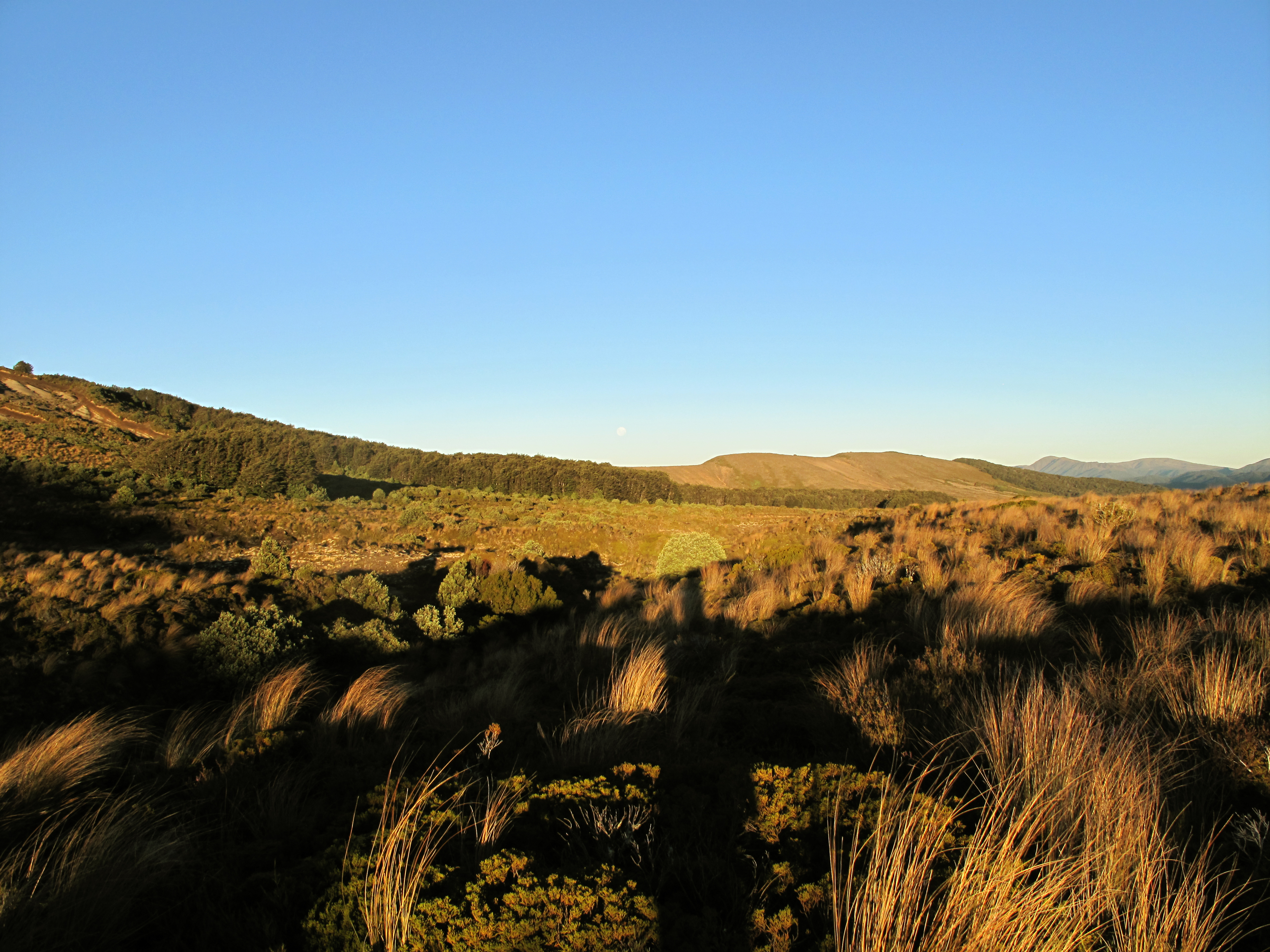
Kaimanawa Range, south of Lake Taupō

According to Te Hata, after the Battle at One-mara-rangi, Ngāti Hotu were completely wiped out and their lands were split between Ngāti Tuwharetoa and Ngāti Kurapoto.

According to Locke, however, Ngāti Hotu still existed and Rereao agreed with the leaders of the war party that had been fighting in the northeast that it was best to make peace with the remnant of Ngāti Hotu. This peace was sealed by the marriage of a Tūwharetoa woman, Hineuru, to the Ngāti Hotu rangatira Paepaetehe.

The Ngāti Hotu remnant were left with Motiti in the rough territory of the Kaimanawa Range south of Taupō as their main centre and nursed a grievance against Tūwharetoa for the losses that they had suffered. Eventually, they attempted to take revenge for this grievance. When Hineuru’s brothers, Taumaihi, Puteketeke, and Rorotaka came to visit Motiti, Paepaetehe invited them in and pretended to prepare a feast, by placing feathers in their oven so that it would smell as if they were cooking birds, while really planning to massacre the visitors. However, Hineuru realised what was being planned and warned her brothers in time, and they managed to fight their way out. Puteketeke suffered a wound to the thigh, but all three brothers made it out alive, fleeing to Whaka-pou-karakia and from there to Taupō.

Ngāti Tuwharetoa gathered a war party which marched south and fought an inconclusive battle with Ngāti Hotu. Afterwards, Waikari was sent to the Bay of Plenty to gather reinforcements and succeeded in gathering a force at Taupō, co-led by him and Tūtewero. They brought the atua Rongomai with them. The war party split up into four sections: Taringa led a force to the Waimarino River; Karihi led a force to Whakapou-karakia; Tūtewero led another force; and Waikari led a fourth force. Waikari captured Ngau-i-taua-pa and massacred the inhabitants. Those members of Ngāti Hotu who survived fled to Tuhua and the Whanganui River (where they were wiped out by Whanganui Maori in the Battle of the Five Forts), leaving the area south of Lake Taupō to Ngāti Tuwharetoa.

== Bibliography ==
- Locke, Samuel (1882). "Historical Traditions of Taupo and East Coast Tribes". Transactions and Proceedings of the Royal Society of New Zealand. 15: 433–459.
- Te Hata, Hoeta; Fletcher, H. J. (1916). "The Ngati-Tuhare-toa occupation of Taupo-nui-a-tia". Journal of the Polynesian Society. 25 (99): 104–116.
