= Tūwharetoa i te Aupōuri =

Māori ariki (chieftain)

Tūwharetoa i te Aupōuri, also called Tūwharetoa-waewae-rakau, was a Māori ariki (chieftain) in the Bay of Plenty, New Zealand and the eponymous ancestor of the Ngāti Tūwharetoa iwi, who probably lived in the sixteenth century. During his life, he established control over a large section of the Bay of Plenty "Mai I Te Awa o Te Atua ki Putauaki. In his old age, his children and grandchildren invaded Taupō, which became the tuahu of the iwi's rohe.

This saying of the Iwi is still used in their kōrero: "Mai I Te Awa o Te Atua ki Tongariro, peka atu ki Tokorangi Te Paepae o Tuwharetoa ki te Tonga"

== Life ==
Tūwharetoa was the son of Mawake-Taupō and Hahuru. Through his father, he descended ultimately from Ngātoro-i-rangi, who arrived in New Zealand on the Arawa canoe, Toroa, captain of the Mātaatua canoe, and the atua, Rongomai-nui. Through his mother, he was descended from Hapuonone, a tribe that had been settled at Ōhiwa before the arrival of Arawa, and from Mataatua. This ancestry gave him great mana and a strong claim to the land. On account of this, he was married to a Puhi of Nga Maihi; Uira whom he had 3 sons and 2 daughters. From this marriage were born the Tohunga children of Tuwharetoa. The Tribal elders also married him to Paekitawhiti who was also of very high rank. From this marriage were born the Ariki lines of Ngāti Tūwharetoa. At the birth of their son, Rongomai-te-ngangana, Tūwharetoa took the baby up Otukoiro to announce the birth of the future ariki.

After this, Mawake-Taupō told Tūwharetoa to go out with a band to visit the surrounding tribes and lands. At the Mōtū River, he visited the village of Rongomai-ururangi, then paramount chief of Ngāitai. Rongomai-ururangi's daughter led a poi dance to welcome the band, which responded with a haka. Tūwharetoa and Hinemotu fell in love and she ran off with him. They married at Mawake-Taupō's pā at Kawerau and settled at Waitahanui, where they had nine children.

John Te Herekiekie Grace reports that Tūwharetoa was a remarkable warrior, a wise advisor, and a master wood carver. With the help of his great grandson Tūtewero son of Maruka, Tūwharetoa established control of a region encompassing Ōtamarākau, the Awa-o-te-atua (Tarawera River), and Kawerau.

=== Invasion of Taupō ===
When Tūwharetoa was an old man, Tūtewero was attacked by a group called Marangaranga / Maruiwi but handily defeated them. Ngāti Tūwharetoa were ashamed that this conflict had taken place without them, so Tūwharetoa's sons Rakeihopukia, Rākei-poho, Taniwha-paretuiri, and Rongomai-te-ngangana formed a war party of 240 men and attacked the Marangaranga / Maruiwi. They suffered a terrible defeat at Kaka-tarae near Runanga Lake, but the survivors were able to avenge their defeat.

According to Locke, as the war party was returning from this expedition, they travelled to Hinemaiaia on the coast of Lake Taupō, where they deposited their dead. Then they travelled north along the coast, past Maniaheke and Kowhaiataku to Lake Rotongaio, where an argument with the priestess Hine-kaho-roa culminated in her uttering a powerful curse and comparing Tūwharetoa's ancestors, Rangitu and Tangaroa, to fernroot (i.e. treating them both as food). According to Locke and Te Hata, when the war party departed and reported this to Tūwharetoa at Kawerau, a special sacred force was summoned to Kawerau by Tūwharetoa, who neutralised the curse by sacrificing a lizard. However, Tūwharetoa felt compelled to send an expedition against Ngāti Kurapoto to avenge the insult represented by the curse. According to Grace, the war party returned home to find that Tūwharetoa had died, and the expedition was dispatched by Rakei-Uekaha.

This invasion force, led by Tūwharetoa's grandsons Rongo-Patuiwi and Taringa, his great-grandsons Waikari and Tutewero, and his son Rereao Tutewero brought with him Te Atua Rongomai and the mere Pounamu of Mawake Taupo; Pahikauri. Turangitukua wielding Pahikauri defeated Ngāti Kurapoto on the northeast shore of Taupō and Ngāti Hotu on the southern shore and occupied both territories.

=== Death ===
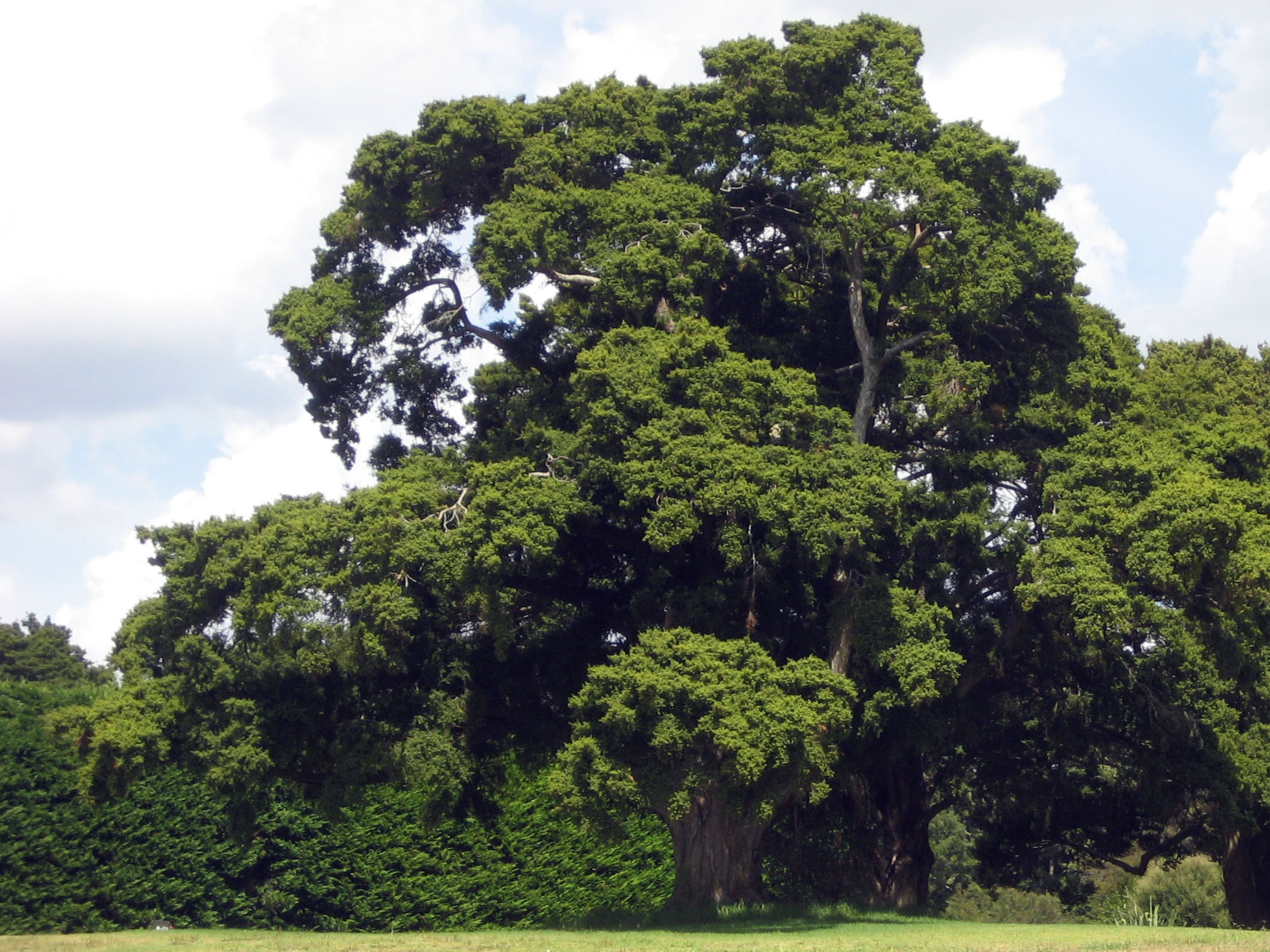
A tōtara tree.

Tūwharetoa died at an advanced age at Waitahanui. He was buried at the nearby cave in the hills above Kawerau. According to the section still based in the Bay of Plenty, Te Ngako interred the bones in a hole in the trunk of a great tōtara tree, that was still alive as of 1959.

== Family ==
Tūwharetoa married three women and had children with all of them. His senior wife was Uira daughter of Te Aohurungaterangi (Paramount chief of Nga Maihi) descendant of Toroa, by whom he had 3 sons and 2 daughters: Rakeimarama his eldest son, Manuwhare his eldest daughter, Rakeiuekaha, Mawake hore and Karihiawe. all of whom were taught in the sacred teachings of Tohunga in their own rights. A Mana still maintained by their descendants at Kawerau.

A second marriage was to a Wahine Tapu (Ariki Tapairu) Te Paekitawhiti, by whom he had a daughter and a son:

- A daughter, Manaiawharepu, first in a line of female chiefs (ariki tūpuna) which continued unbroken until Rangiamohia Te Herekiekie, who died in 1908.
- Rongomai-te-ngangana, who died at the battle of Kaka-tarae, but left two sons the ancestor of the kāhui ariki of Tūwharetoa:

- Tūtapiriao, father of Rongoteahu, father of Piri, father of Tunono the upoko ariki, father of Umutahi, the ancestor of Ngāti Umutahi hapu, through his marriage to Rangipare
- Rakaumaoa - Pokipoki - Te Paetata - Te Araomakau - Tahapirau;

Kahuiwaho and Turangitukua, the ancestor of the Aitanga a Huruao hapū, through his children by Te Rewhangao-te-rangi:

- Hingaia, who married Rupokohuka and had descendants.
- Te Maha-o-te-rangi, who had descendants.
- Te Rangitautahanga, upoko ariki
- Hinerangi, who married Taopowaha and had descendants.

- Whakatihi, father of Tūpoto, father of Tāne-turiwera, father of Hinetuki, who married her cousin Taringa.

Tūwharetoa's third wife was Hinemotu, by whom he had two daughters and seven sons:

- Hinewhareuia (daughter)
- Rākei-poho

- Rakeihopukia
- Taringa, who married his cousin Hinetuki (descendant of Whakatihi) and had two sons

- Te Rapuhoro
- Tū-te-tawhā, ancestor of Ngāti Te Rangiita and Ngāti Tūrū-makina.

- Taniwha, father of Rongo-patuiwi, father of Waikari.
- Turangiawe
- Hinengarorangi
- Te Aotahi
- Poukopa
- Poutomuri

On a visit to Rotorua, Tūwharetoa slept with Rangiuru, the wife of Whakauekaipapa, the ancestor Ngāti Whakaue, resulting in a son, Tūtānekai, who is famous for his romance with Hinemoa.

== Bibliography ==
- Locke, Samuel (1882). "Historical Traditions of Taupo and East Coast Tribes". Transactions and Proceedings of the Royal Society of New Zealand. 15: 433–459.
- Te Hata, Hoeta; Fletcher, H. J. (1916). "Ngati-Tuhare-toa occupation of Taupo-nui-a-tia". Journal of the Polynesian Society. 25: 104–116, 150–162.
- Grace, John Te Herekiekie (1959). Tuwharetoa: The history of the Maori people of the Taupo District. Auckland [N.Z.]: A.H. & A.W. Reed.
- Stafford, Don (1967). Te Arawa: A History of the Arawa People. Reed. ISBN 9780947506100.
- Jones, Pei Te Hurinui; Biggs, Bruce (2004). Ngā iwi o Tainui : nga koorero tuku iho a nga tuupuna = The traditional history of the Tainui people. Auckland [N.Z.]: Auckland University Press. ISBN 1869403312.
- McCallum-Haire, Hermione; Te Nana, Rihi; Gallagher, Joanne (2021). "Hihiko O Mangarautawhiri: Power Sovereignty for a Prosperous Whānau and Hapū". Scope: Contemporary Research Topics (Kaupapa Kai Tahu) (6): 33–43. doi:10.34074/scop.2006011.
