= Waihāhā River =

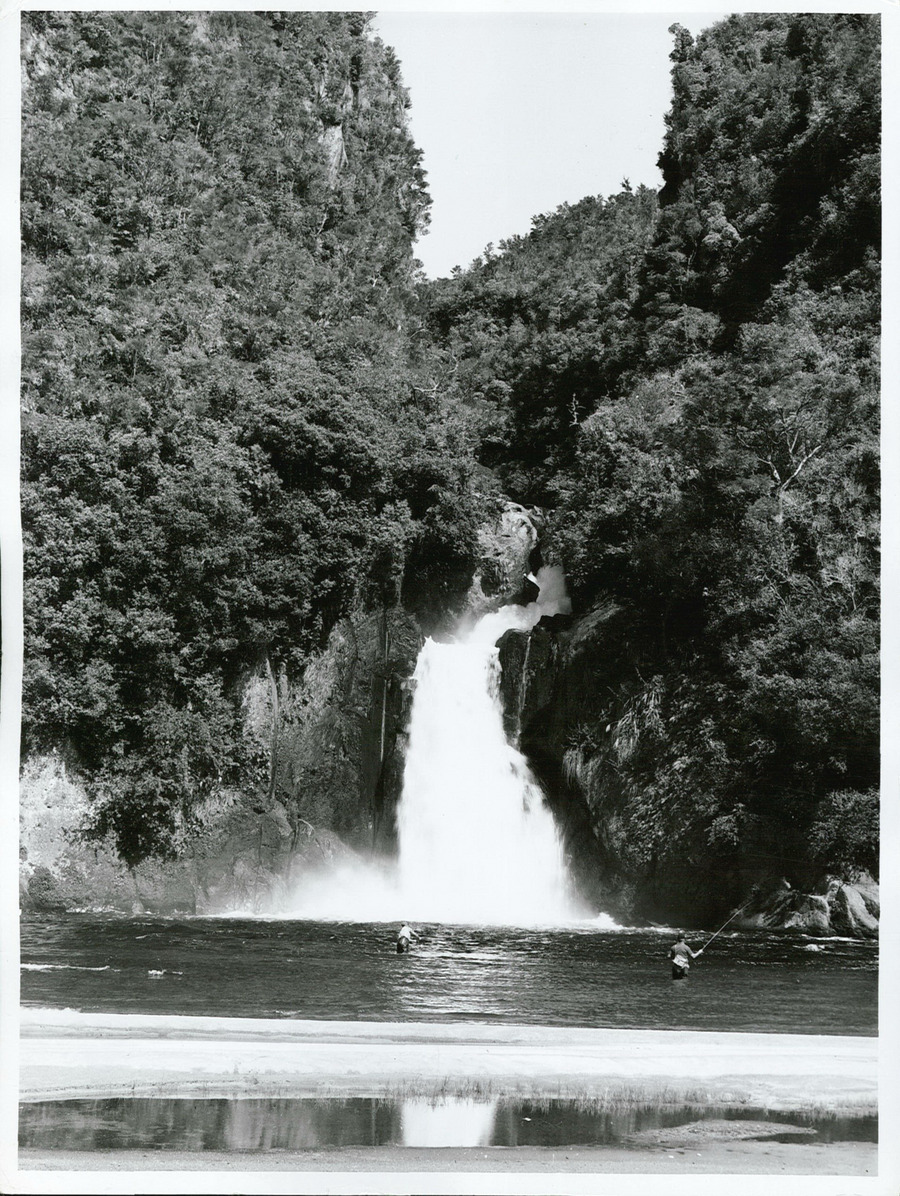
- Waihāhā Falls

Location
- Country: New Zealand

Physical characteristics
- Source
  - location: Hauhungaroa Range
- Mouth
  - location: Lake Taupō
  - coordinates: 38°43′18″S 175°44′55″E
- Length: 20 km (12 mi)

The Waihāhā River is a river of the Waikato Region of New Zealand's North Island. It flows from its origins in several streams west of Lake Taupō, the most important of which are the Mangatu and Waitaia streams, which have their headwaters in the Hauhungaroa Range. The Waihaha flows into the Western Bay of Lake Taupō at the settlement of Waihāhā, 20 kilometres (12 mi) north of Kuratau.

== See also ==
- List of rivers of New Zealand
