= Mangakino Stream =

Location
- Country: New Zealand

Physical characteristics
- Source
  - location: e. slope of Mount Pureora, Hauhungaroa Range
  - elevation: approximately 1,060 metres (3,480 ft) ASL
- Mouth
  - location: Lake Maraetai, Waikato River
  - coordinates: 38°23′23″S 175°46′09″E
- Length: 40 km (25 mi)

The Mangakino Stream is a tributary of the Waikato River. It flows into Lake Maraetai just upstream of the Mangakino township.

The Mangakino Stream is approximately 40 kilometres (25 miles) in length.

The stream was once known as Mangakino River. By 1949 both names were in use.

== Etymology ==
In Māori, mangakino means "stagnant (or useless) stream" (manga = stream, kino = useless or stagnant).
