= Walter Edward Gudgeon =

New Zealand police commissioner

Walter Gudgeon CMG
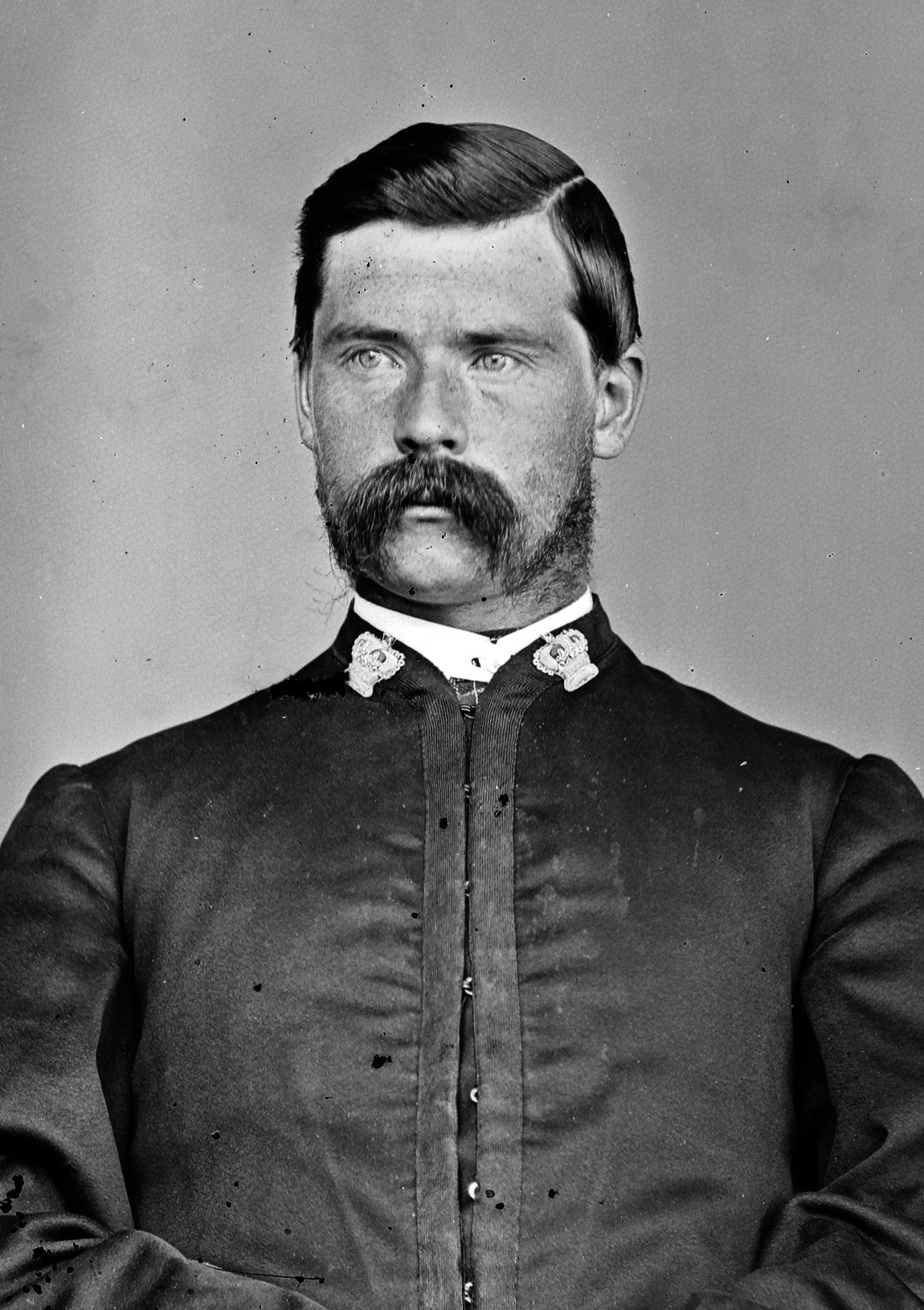

British Resident in the Cook Islands
- In office 1898–1901
- Preceded by: Frederick Moss
- Succeeded by: Post abolished

Resident Commissioner of the Cook Islands
- In office 1901–1909
- Preceded by: Post created
- Succeeded by: James Eman Smith

Personal details
- Born: Walter Edward Gudgeon; 4 September 1841 London, United Kingdom
- Died: 5 January 1920 (aged 78) Devonport, New Zealand

Walter Edward Gudgeon CMG (4 September 1841 – 5 January 1920) was a New Zealand farmer, soldier, historian, land court judge, and colonial administrator.

== Early life ==
Born in London, Walter Gudgeon was the first child of Thomas Wayth Gudgeon, an upholsterer, and his first wife, Mary Johnston. The family emigrated to New Zealand in 1850 and settled in New Plymouth. Walter left school to work on the family farm at the age of 11. Conscious all his life of his lack of formal education, he made up for it by reading voraciously. After leaving home at 16, he became an accomplished shepherd and drover.

== Military ==
Gudgeon was managing a farm near Wanganui when fighting broke out in the area. In March 1865 he joined the Wanganui Bushrangers, and three months later became second-in-command of the Wanganui Native Contingent under Thomas McDonnell.

Gudgeon was next given command of the Runanga redoubt, one of a string of forts built between Tapuaeharuru (Taupō) and Napier to restrict Te Kooti's movements. With the guerrilla leader on the run, the duties of the Armed Constabulary focused on drilling and road making. In February 1874 Gudgeon's tedium was relieved when he was put in charge of the sensitive Poverty Bay district. Based at Ormond, he made typically astute land purchases and also met Edith Maria Best (sister of Elsdon Best), whom he married in Wellington on 16 January 1875. She died of tuberculosis on 21 March 1879 after bearing three children, Hilda, Constance and Westwood.

By May 1880 Gudgeon had been transferred back to Taranaki to join the forces being concentrated against Parihaka. When the settlement was invaded on 5 November 1881 he led the company that arrested Te Whiti and Tohu Kākahi. Posted to Manaia, he built a sophisticated redoubt, grew ornamental trees and supervised road making. He also courted Emily Bertha Tuke (known as Bertha), the daughter of his former commanding officer and a member of a landed Hawke's Bay family. They married at Napier on 24 January 1882 and had two sons, Herman and Melville (evidence of Gudgeon's erudition was thus transmitted to posterity), and two daughters, Gladys and Beryl. His grand-daughter was Alison Drummond.

== Native Land Court Judge ==
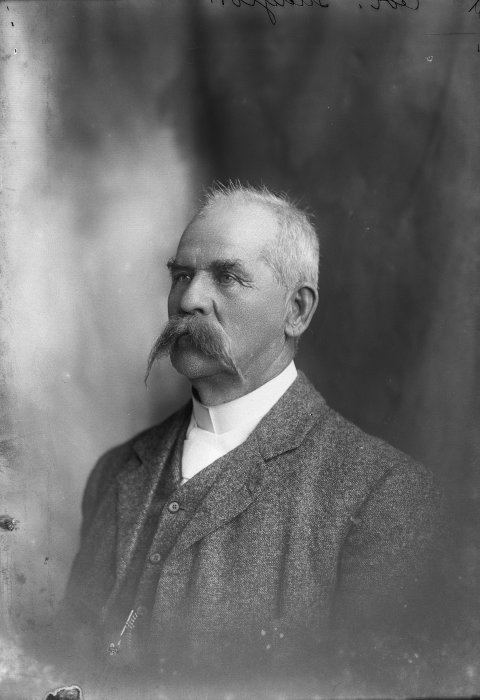
Walter Edward Gudgeon in 1911

Gudgeon became a judge of the Native Land Court, sitting most notably in the King Country on the Rohe Potae case. He was also made a judge of the Validation Court and a trust commissioner under the Native Lands Frauds Prevention Act 1881. This work enabled him to pursue a long-standing interest in Māori language and history. In 1892 he was one of the founders of the Polynesian Society. He contributed a number of articles to its journal, one of which was described by Edward Tregear as 'Absolutely and entirely valueless....All the old stuff...we left behind 20 years ago'. It appears that he had earlier written three books, Reminiscences of the war in New Zealand (1879), The history and doings of the Māoris (1885) and The defenders of New Zealand (1887), all of which were published under his father's name.

== Cook Islands British Resident ==
In August 1898 Gudgeon, now a lieutenant colonel, was appointed British Resident in the Cook Islands. Seddon intimated that Gudgeon's real task was to annex the islands to New Zealand, and Gudgeon, whose belief in his 'manifest destiny' had led him to dream of one day being 'Governor of Fighi', accepted this mission with alacrity. In April 1900 the Rarotonga ariki consented to annexation, but to Great Britain, not New Zealand. A quickly arranged visit 'for health reasons' by Seddon, who made lavish and mostly unfulfilled promises of aid, and some fast talking by Gudgeon persuaded the ariki to agree to be annexed to Great Britain and federated with New Zealand. In reality, the island became New Zealand territory. When the formalities were completed in June 1901, Gudgeon was rewarded as a Companion of the Order of St Michael and St George (CMG) on 19 June 1901, on the occasion of the visit of TRH the Duke and Duchess of Cornwall and York (later King George V and Queen Mary) to New Zealand.

== Later life ==
In 1909 the increasingly cantankerous Gudgeon was retired by Prime Minister Joseph Ward, according to Gudgeon because of his lapsed Catholicism. In 1914 he served briefly as censor of telegraphic messages before his official career ended, appropriately, in a row over his salary. He died at his home in Devonport, Auckland, on 5 January 1920. Bertha Gudgeon died in 1933.

In the 1940s, John Cowie Reid gave plaudits for Gudgeon's account saying he showed respect for his Māori adversaries in his writings.

== Bibliography ==
- Gudgeon, Thomas Wayth (1879). Reminiscences of the War in New Zealand. London: Sampson Low, Marston, Searle & Rivington.
- Gudgeon, Thomas Wayth (1885). History and Traditions of the Maoris. Auckland: H. Brett.
- Gudgeon, Thomas Wayth (1885). The History and Doings of the Maoris: From the Year 1820 to the Signing of the Treaty of Waitangi in 1840. Auckland: H. Brett.
- Gudgeon, Thomas Wayth (1887). The Defenders of New Zealand: Being a Short Biography of Colonists who Distinguished Themselves in Upholding Her Majesty's Supremacy in These Islands. Auckland: H. Brett.
- Gudgeon, Thomas Wayth (1887). Defenders of New Zealand and Maori History of the War. Auckland: H. Brett.
- T. W. Gudgeon, Reminiscences of the Maori Wars and Defenders of New Zealand

Police appointments
Preceded by George Stoddart Whitmore	Commissioner of Police of New Zealand; 1887–1890	Succeeded by Arthur Hume
