= Tohunga =

Expert practitioner in Māori culture

In the culture of the Māori of New Zealand, a tohunga (tōhuka in Southern Māori dialect) is an expert practitioner of any skill or art, either religious or otherwise. Tohunga include expert priests, healers, navigators, carvers, builders, teachers and advisors. A tohunga may have also been the head of a whānau (family) but quite often was also a rangatira (chief) and an ariki (noble). The equivalent and cognate in Hawaiian culture is kahuna, tahu'a in Tahitian.

== Callings and practices ==
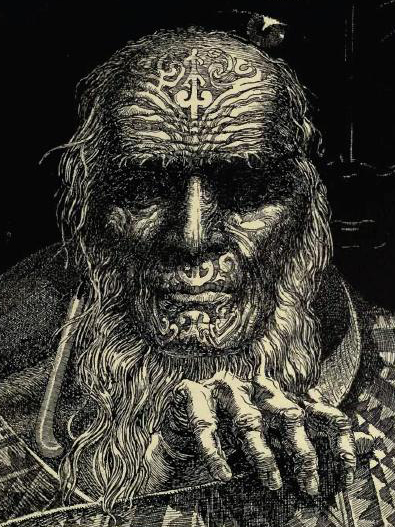
"Matapo, a blind tohunga" in Te Tohunga by Wilhelm Dittmer, 1907

There are many classes of tohunga (Best 1924:166) including:

- Tohunga ahurewa: highest class of priest
- Tohunga matakite: foretellers of the future
- Tohunga whakairo: expert carvers
- Tohunga raranga: expert weavers
- Tohunga tātai arorangi: experts at reading the stars
- Tohunga kōkōrangi: expert in the study of celestial bodies (astronomer)
- Tohunga tārai waka: expert canoe builders
- Tohunga wetereo: expert in the language (linguist)
- Tohunga tā moko: expert in tā moko (tattooist)
- Tohunga mahi toi: expert artist
- Tohunga tikanga tangata: expert in the study of humans (anthropologist)
- Tohunga o Tumatauenga: expert in weapons or war party chaplain
- Tohunga kiato: lowest class of priest

Each tohunga was a gifted spiritual leader and possessed the natural ability of communicating between the spiritual and temporal realms through karakia (prayers), pātere (chants) or performing waiata (songs) that had been passed down to them by tohunga before them. However, their rites were mainly in the specific fields in which they practiced, as outlined above.

== Practices and knowledge ==
Tohunga held knowledge of most spiritual and temporal rites, and knowledge in general was passed down through many generations by oral communication at wananga (places of learning/schools). Tools they also used were taonga pūoro for the purpose of calling on divine intervention or assistance from the gods.

Although Māori had high respect for the knowledge and skills of tohunga, witchcraft was feared by both superstitious Maori and Europeans alike. Settler prejudices, the risk of charlatans taking advantage of vulnerable people, and because many forms of traditional Māori medicine were no longer effective against introduced European diseases, this combination of factors led to the enactment of the Tohunga Suppression Act 1907.

Some tohunga declined to pass on their oral traditions after the Act was enforced in New Zealand, leaving Māori people bereft of much of their traditional base, beliefs and practices. The Act was repealed in 1962, but by this time, much of the language and traditions had been either corrupted or lost, but a few kaumatua and kuia continued to orally communicate their knowledge through the generations.

The importance, role and practices of female tohunga have been to some extent been ignored, or only briefly touched upon by twentieth century scholars, and have only been explored with greater depth in modern times.

=== Tohunga under tapu ===
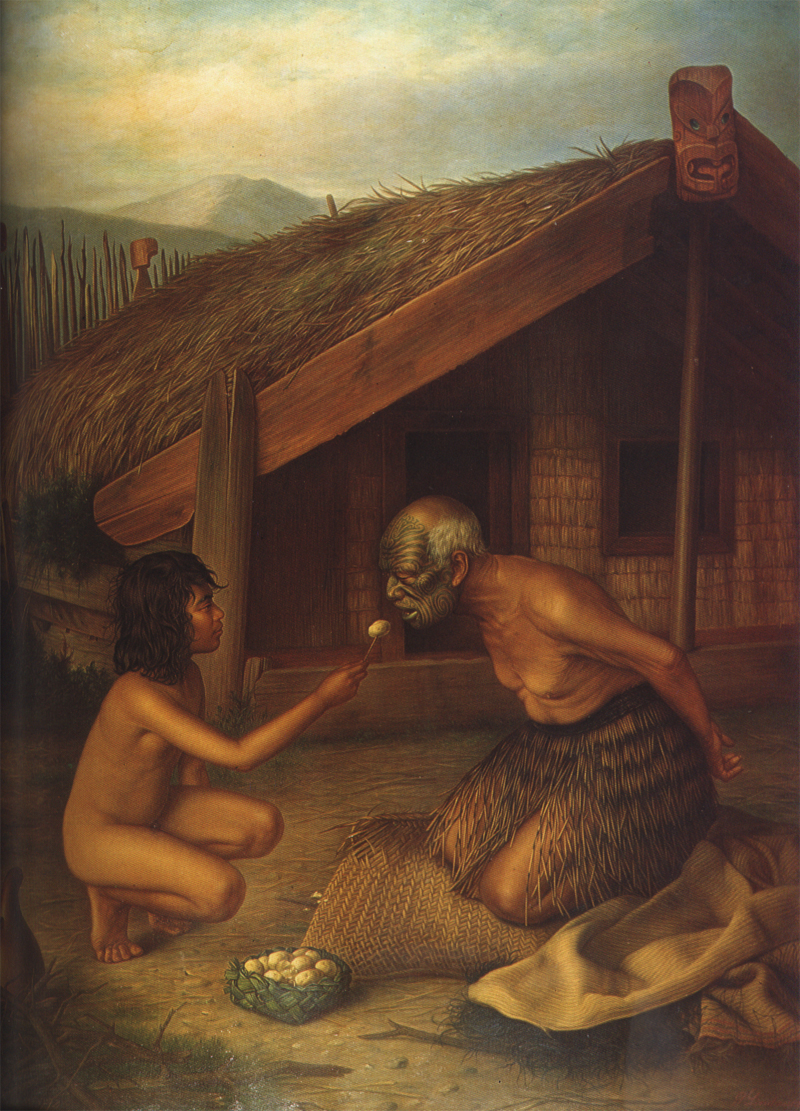
Tohunga handling the dead would be fed by another, as they would become tapu and so could not handle food.

Tapu was, and still is, one of the most deeply ingrained beliefs and religious customs of Māori. The word tapu may be translated as "sacred" or "forbidden", but Māori tapu has a host of variations. There was a personal tapu and local tapu; tapu of one kind or another faced the Māori everywhere. It often served a purpose similar to some of the Jewish laws of prohibition and quarantine.

Tohunga were imbued with the mysterious essences of the tapu because of their knowledge of ancient and potent karakia, religious ceremonies and their office as mediums of communication with the atua (gods and spirits). All ariki also had a strong personal tapu which prevented any common person eating out of the same food basket or using anything belonging to the chief.

The remains of the sacred dead and all connected therewith were highly tapu and anyone who had been engaged in handling the dead or bones of the dead would be extremely tapu and would not dare to touch food with the hands. Consequently, such persons had to be fed in the manner shown in the painting here. This was painted from life at an old-time pā (village) in the Wanganui district. The outer palisaded fence of the pā, with its roughly carved posts, usually tōtara, is shown in the background. The tohunga is kneeling on mats in front of a raupō whare (house) in a remote corner of the settlement.
