= John Grace (Māori leader) =

New Zealand interpreter and public servant (1905–1985)

Sir John Grace KBE MVO
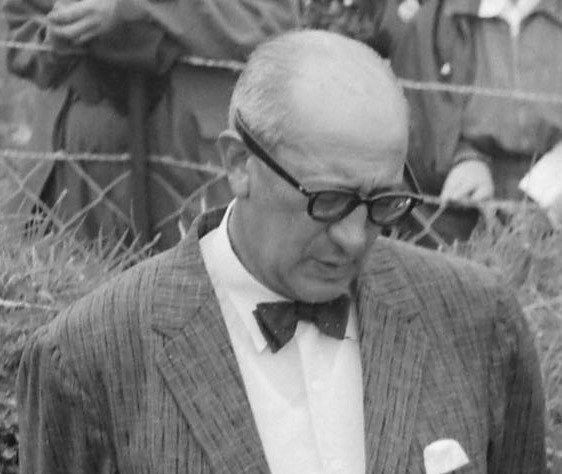
- Grace in 1961 at Te Pōrere

1st High Commissioner of New Zealand to Fiji
- In office 1970 – 1973
- Succeeded by: Graham Ansell

Personal details
- Born: Sir John Te Herekiekie Grace; 28 July 1905 Whanganui, New Zealand
- Died: 11 August 1985 (aged 80) Wanganui, New Zealand
- Occupation: Interpreter, public servant, community leader

Sir John Te Herekiekie Grace KBE MVO (28 July 1905 – 11 August 1985) was a New Zealand interpreter, public servant, community leader and New Zealand's first High Commissioner to Fiji. Of Māori descent, he identified with the Ngāti Tūwharetoa iwi. He was born in Whanganui, New Zealand on 28 July 1905.

In 1953, Grace was awarded the Queen Elizabeth II Coronation Medal. He was appointed a Member of the Royal Victorian Order in the 1954 New Zealand Royal Visit Honours. In the 1968 New Year Honours, he was appointed a Knight Commander of the Order of the British Empire, for services to the Māori people and in public affairs. Grace's book, Tuwharetoa: A history of the Maori people of the Taupo District, published in 1959, was listed in Books of Mana as one of the 180 most significant works of Māori-authored non-fiction.
