= Tamamutu =

Māori ariki (chieftain)

Places in the life of Tamamutu
1 Motutere
2 Lake Rotongaio
3 Tokaanu
4 Manganuioteao River
5 Pukeroa, Lake Rotorua
6 Motutaiko Island
7 Tangoio
8 Mohaka

Tamamutu was a 17th-century Māori ariki (chieftain) of the Ngāti Te Rangiita hapū and the paramount chief of the Ngāti Tūwharetoa iwi of the region around Lake Taupō, New Zealand. He was based at Motutere, but was an active warrior, leading campaigns against the Whanganui Māori of the Manganuioteao River valley to the southwest, against Te Arawa on the shores of Lake Rotorua to the north, and against Ngati Kahungunu in Hawke’s Bay. He was also a talented orator, who is the source of several whakatauki (Māori proverbs) and forged a lasting peace between Ngāti Tūwharetoa and Te Arawa. On his death, he was succeeded as paramount chief of Ngāti Tūwharetoa by his son Kapawa.

== Life ==
Tamamutu was the oldest son of Te Rangi-ita and Waitapu. Through his father, Te Rangi-ita, he was a descendant of Tūwharetoa i te Aupōuri. His mother was the daughter of Te Ata-inutai of Ngāti Raukawa, through whom he was a descendant of Hoturoa, captain of the Tainui canoe. His parents had been married as part of a peace agreement which ended an attack by Te Ata-inutai on Ngāti Tūwharetoa. He had four older sisters, Pare-kāwa, Te Uru-kaihina, Te Piunga-tai, and Tore-iti and three younger brothers, Manu-nui, Meremere, Tū-te-tawhā. They all grew up at Marae-kōwhai, north of Lake Taupō, near Mōkai.

Te Rangi-ita had been the ariki (paramount chief) of Ngāti Tūwharetoa and he chose Tamamutu as his heir, despite his cousin Te Rangitautahanga supporting Manu-nui. After receiving the position, Tamamutu travelled north and settled at Motutere.

Tamamutu was a talented orator and inventor of whakatauki (proverbs). He is responsible for the Māori term for cumulus clouds, te kapua whakapipi (the guardian cloud), which he invented because of the way in which the cumulus clouds gather over the Kaimanawa Range. He claimed that the clouds were guarding the region from hostile tribes and that Ngāti Tūwharetoa would remain secure so long as all its hapū continued to clumb together like the clouds.

=== Journey with Te Rangi-pātōtō ===
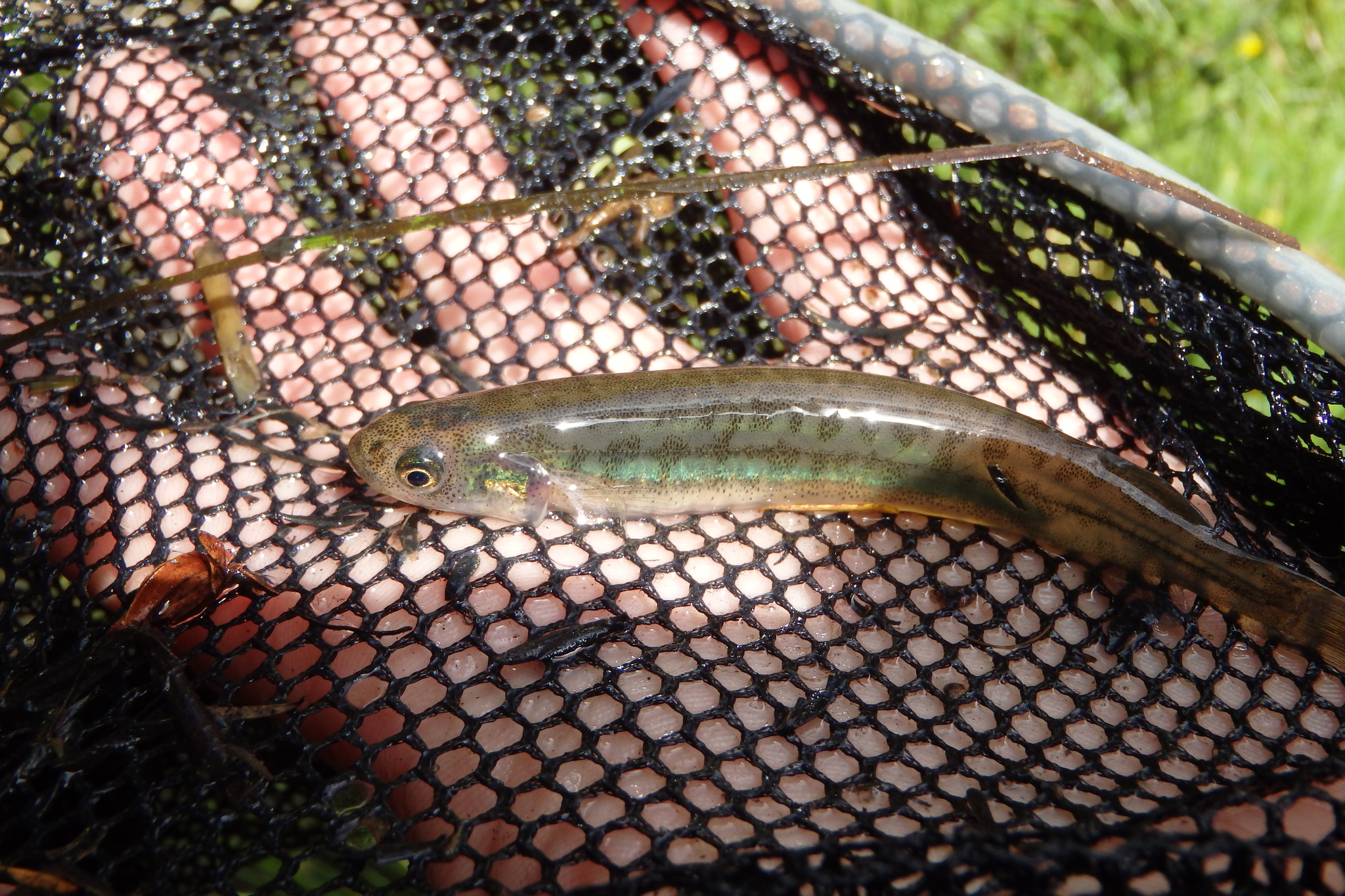
Inanga.

Te Rangi-pātōtō, a young relative of Tamamutu became his takahoa (personal intimate). He proposed that he and Tamamutu make a journey to visit his father, Po-te-heuea, at Te Pirau on Lake Roto-ngaio. They took a net for catching inanga, which Te Rangi-pātōtō carried, until they reached the Maniheke cliffs, north of the Hinemaiaia Stream, where he proposed that they both try to throw a rock up to the top of the cliff, with the loser carrying the net from then on. Tamamutu lost, so he had to carry the net. In return he proposed that they race the last leg of the journey to Te Pirau and he won by far. Po-te-heuea had him hang the net up at the entrance to the village, wishing to shame Te Rangi-pātōtō because it was inappropriate for him to let his senior carry the net.

=== War with Whanganui ===
==== Expedition to Manganuioteao ====
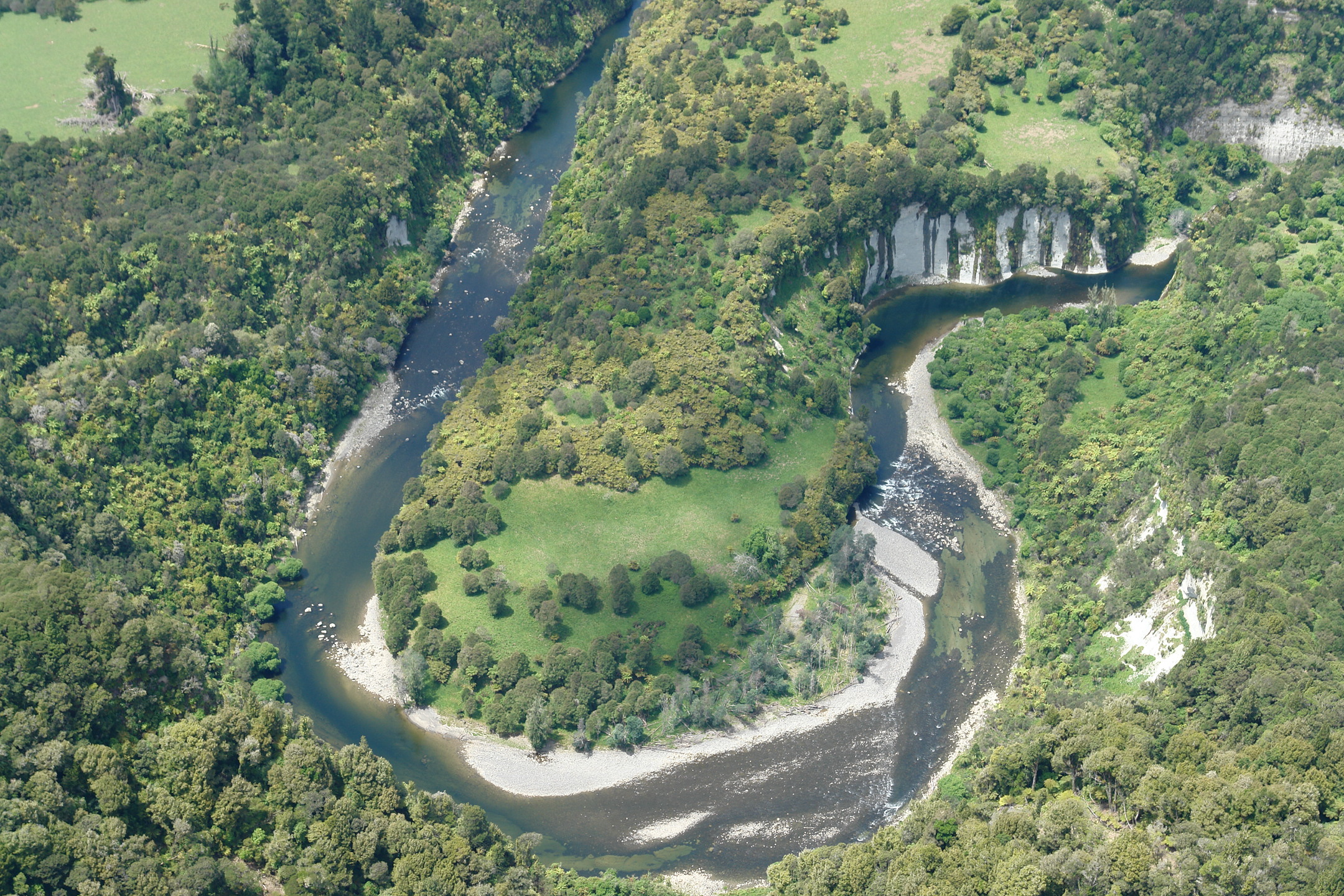
Bends in the Manganuioteao River.

Whanaurangi, mother of Tamamutu's maternal cousins, Tūkino, Taipāhau, and Hokokai, was killed by men from Whanganui. The three children sent a messenger to Tamamutu to ask him to help avenge the murder and he gathered a war party at Tokaanu, performed a haka, and then led the forces to the Manganuioteao River, where they captured a number of villages and killed the local leaders, Tū-te-houi and Tū-te-wheriko.

When they heard about Tamamutu's attack, three Whanganui rangatira, Tū-rāhui, Tohiora, and Tamakana led a war party out against him. They stationed themselves at Ngakorako, an area on Tamamutu's path back to Taupo where there were steep cliffs, which could only be climbed one-by-one, using steps cut in the cliff face and a strong vine. Tamamutu's troops reached Ngakorako at dawn and as they climbed up, the Whanganui men killed them; ten men died before Tamamutu realised what was happening and that they were trapped. Tamamutu shouted up "Who is the man of the world of light?" (the 'world of light', Te Ao Marama, is the world of the living, so this meant, "who will let us escape?") or “Who is the morning star?” (intended as flattery). Tohiora let Tamamutu’s party climb up. Then, Tū-rāhui said that the ten people just killed were not satisfactory compensation for the deaths of Tū-te-houi and Tū-te-wheriko, but he allowed Tamamutu to leave, swearing that he would attack Ngāti Tūwharetoa at a later date. Tamamutu responded that Taupō was a deep lake with many taniwha. Although Manu-nui encouraged him to attack, Tamamutu refused and led his troops back to Taupō.

==== Whanganui attack on Taupō ====
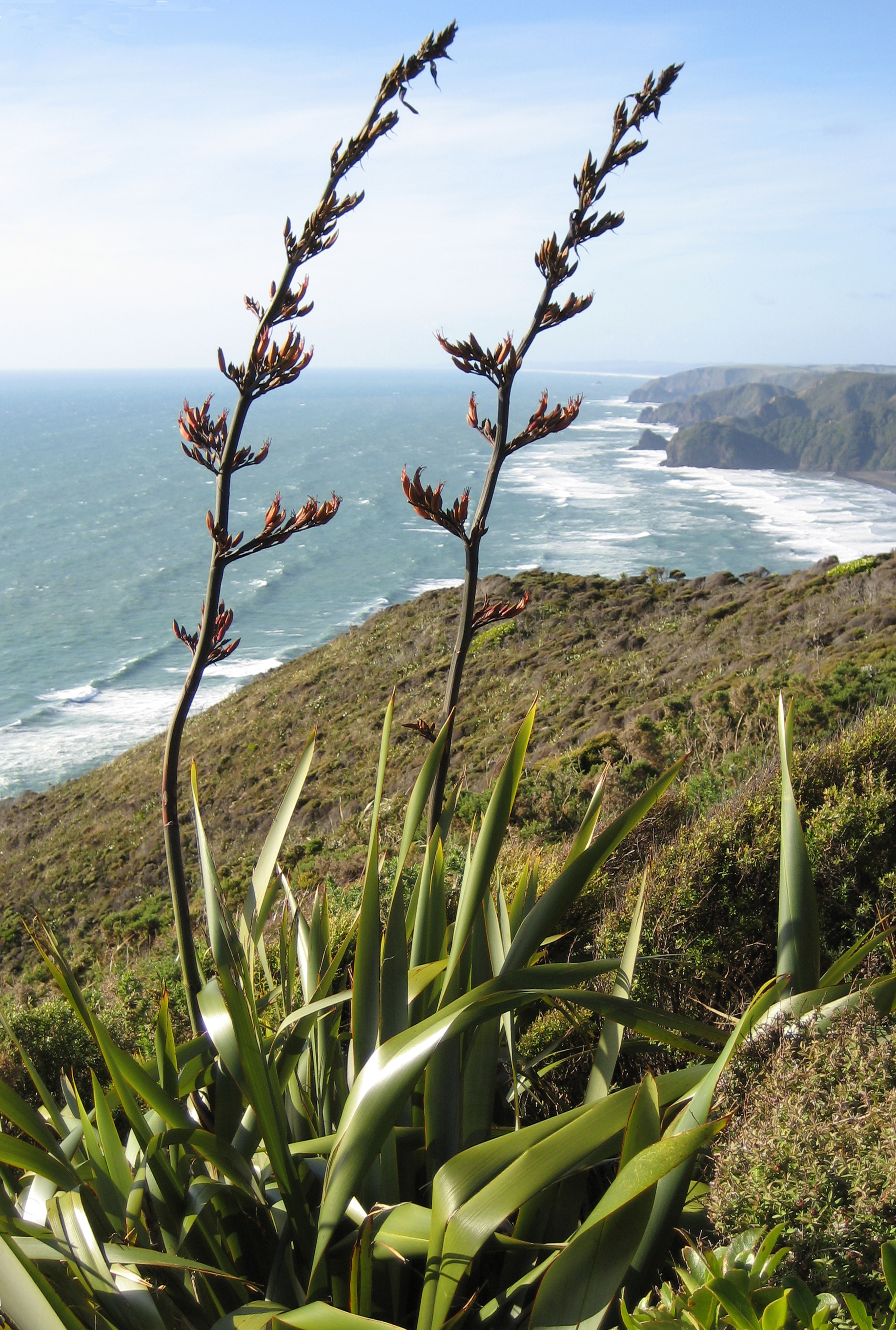
harakeke flax plant.

A year later, Tū-rāhui and Tamakana later led an expedition to Taupō and killed two elderly Ngāti Tūwharetoa ariki, Te Rangi-ka-heke-i-waho and Tawiri-o-te-rangi, at Waitahanui, east of Pihanga. When Tamamutu heard about this, he headed out in his waka, Te Reporepo, with 140 men, including his three brothers, Tūkino, and Taipāhau. They rowed towards the Whanganui forces at Motu-o-apa. The Whanganui heard the waka and turned around, retreating to Tokaanu, while Tamamutu rowed to Waitaha-nui, the village of Te Rangi-ka-heke-i-waho and Tawiri-o-te-rangi, where he held a war council at which Tamamutu delivered a speech which became proverbial:

Tūwharetoa, be careful of the canoe, lest it be overwhelmed by the tide. Red is for burial. It is well to stretch out, but be careful to return to those left behind. The man who has one dwelling place dies; the man with two will live.

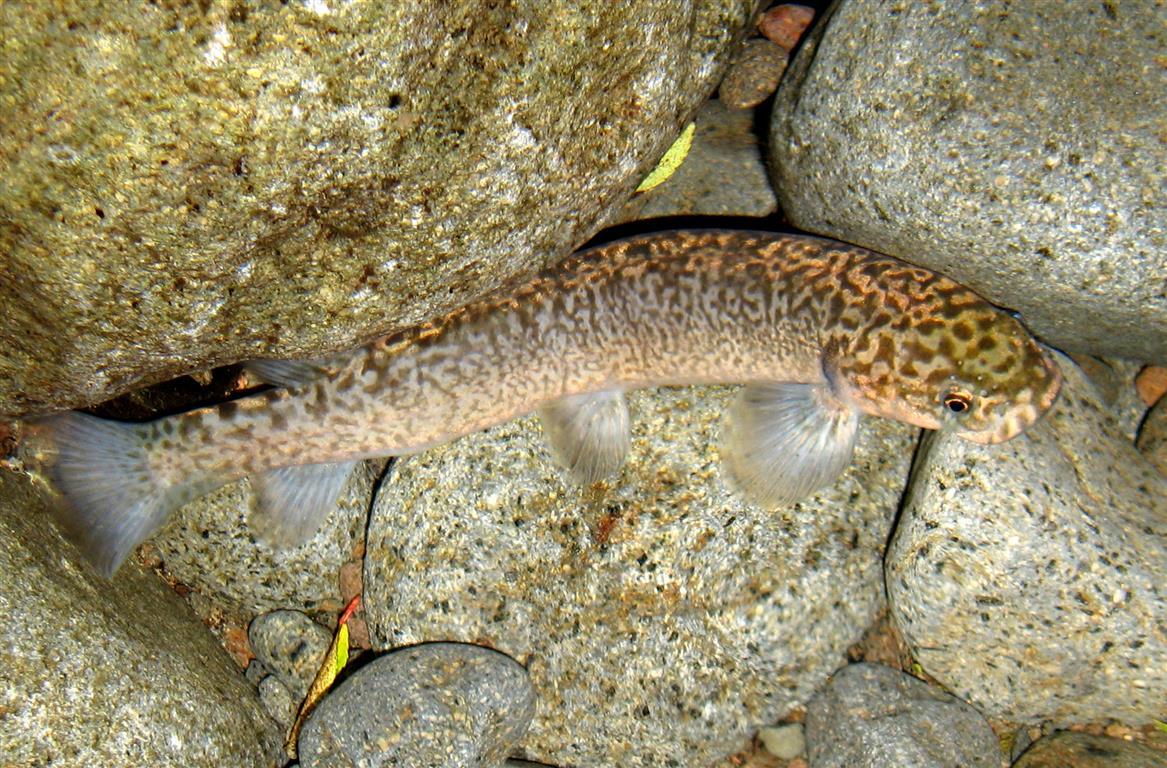
Koaro.

Then they headed out in pursuit of the Whanganui war party, which was now at Pourongo. The local rangatira, Tumiromiro, asked the Whanganui chief, "Tū-rāhui, who is your fish?" and Tū-rāhui named Te Rangi-ka-heke-i-waho and Tawiri-o-te-rangi, saying that he had killed them in revenge for Tamamutu’s killing of Tū-te-houi and Tū-te-wheriko. Tumiromiro was pulling the new shoots out of a harakeke flax plant, a traditional form of divination, and he allowed the Whanganui to pass, predicting that they would soon meet disaster. His words, "I dreamt last night the omen of the flax leaf was bad. Let the morning tide be yours, but the evening tide is for me," have become proverbial.

Whanganui carried on to Poutu, then Mapouriki, and Heretoa. Tū-rāhui distributed koaro to the war party to eat, but the supplies ran out before they got to the other chief, Tamakana, who said "There is nothing but the net, there is no food here." At that moment, Tamamutu attacked. Tamakana fled with his men, saying, "you who ate the fish can stay; us net eaters are going." Tū-rāhui's men stood their ground. Tū-rāhui defeated Tū-te-tawhā, Meremere, Mana-nui, and Tamamutu in single combat, knocking them unconscious, but he was killed by the left-handed warrior, Tūkino. When Mana-nui stepped up to challenge him, Tū-rāhui had said, "who is this man with the red-feathered cloak" (kahu kura), as a result of which, the site of the battle was named Okahukura.

=== War with Te Arawa ===
==== First expedition to Rotorua against Te Roro-o-te-rangi ====
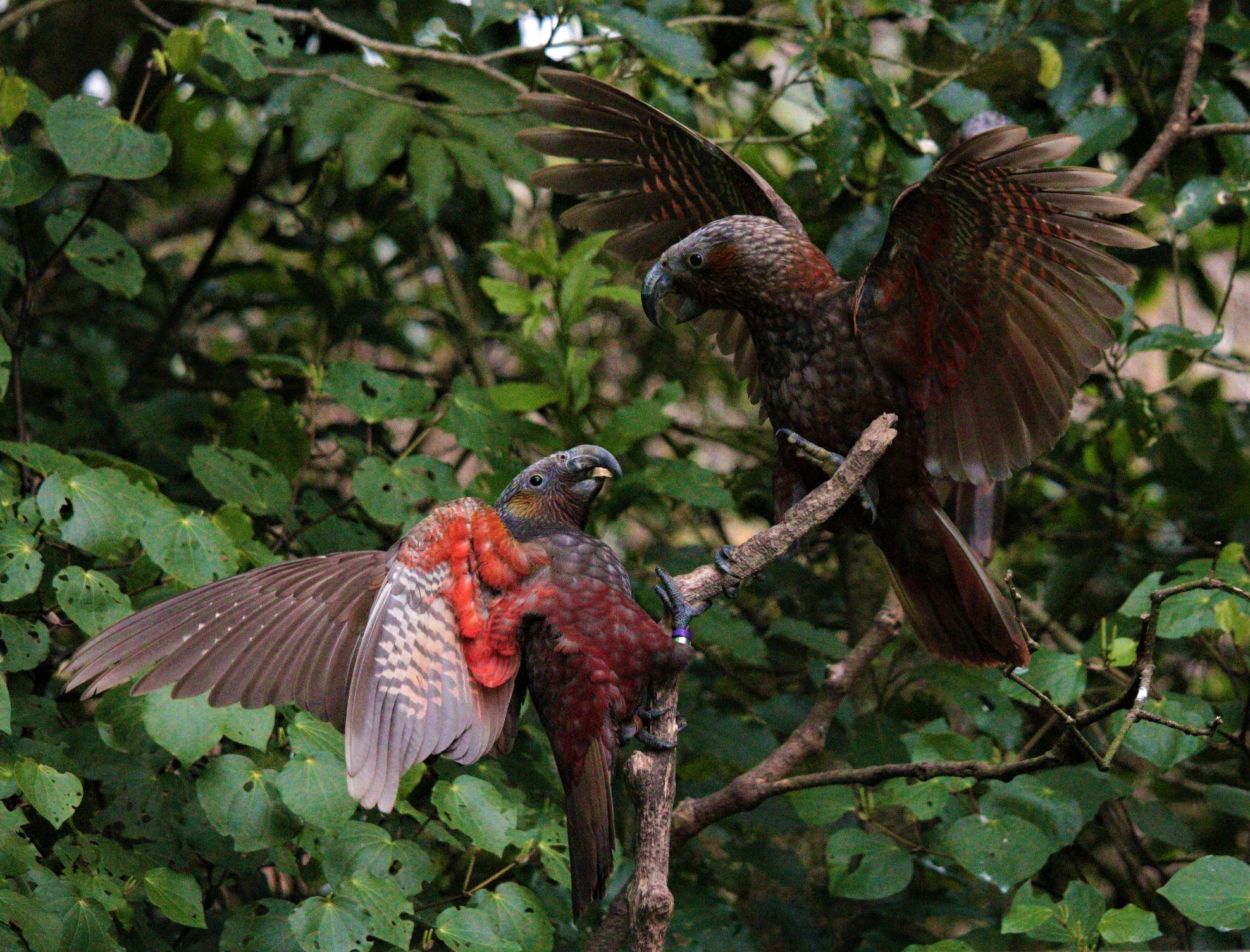
Two Kākā birds.

Tamamutu's people made a kākahu kura (a cloak made of red feathers) for Te Roro-o-te-rangi of Rotorua, but he gave them nothing in return. When Tamamutu sent a messenger to find out why (or, according to D. M. Stafford, when Tamamutu showed up in person to demand the gift), Te Roro-o-te-rangi cursed Tamamutu for his presumption. Therefore Tamamutu and Te Rangi-pātōtō gathered a war party of Ngāti Tūwharetoa and set out.

The party travelled down the Waikato River to Hipa-pātua (near Tapapakuao) where they got out of their canoes and advanced overland. They forged an alliance with Ngāti Kea Ngāti Tuarā, who had been marginalised by Te Arawa, and met to plan at their pā (fortress), Opukaka, near Patere. The party encountered two young men called Tiki and Kaui and killed them. Tūwharetoa sources say that Tamamutu was absent when this occurred. Arawa sources say that Tamamutu ambushed the pair as they came to lay fishing nets at the mouth of the Waikuta Stream near Kawaha Point. The site of the attack was renamed Te Karamuramu a Tikitika. Tiki and Kaui were nephews of To Roro-o-te-rangi, but they were also Tamamutu's relatives and he had been warned by Werewere, son of Tūwharetoa a Turiroa, when the expedition set out, that he should not kill them. When Werewere found out about the killings, he went to Hipa-pātua and cut the expedition's canoes free, sending them over the Huka Falls to destruction. When Tamamutu and Te Rangi-pātōtō returned to Hipa-patua, they discovered what Werewere had done and swore to get revenge.

==== Second expedition to Rotorua ====
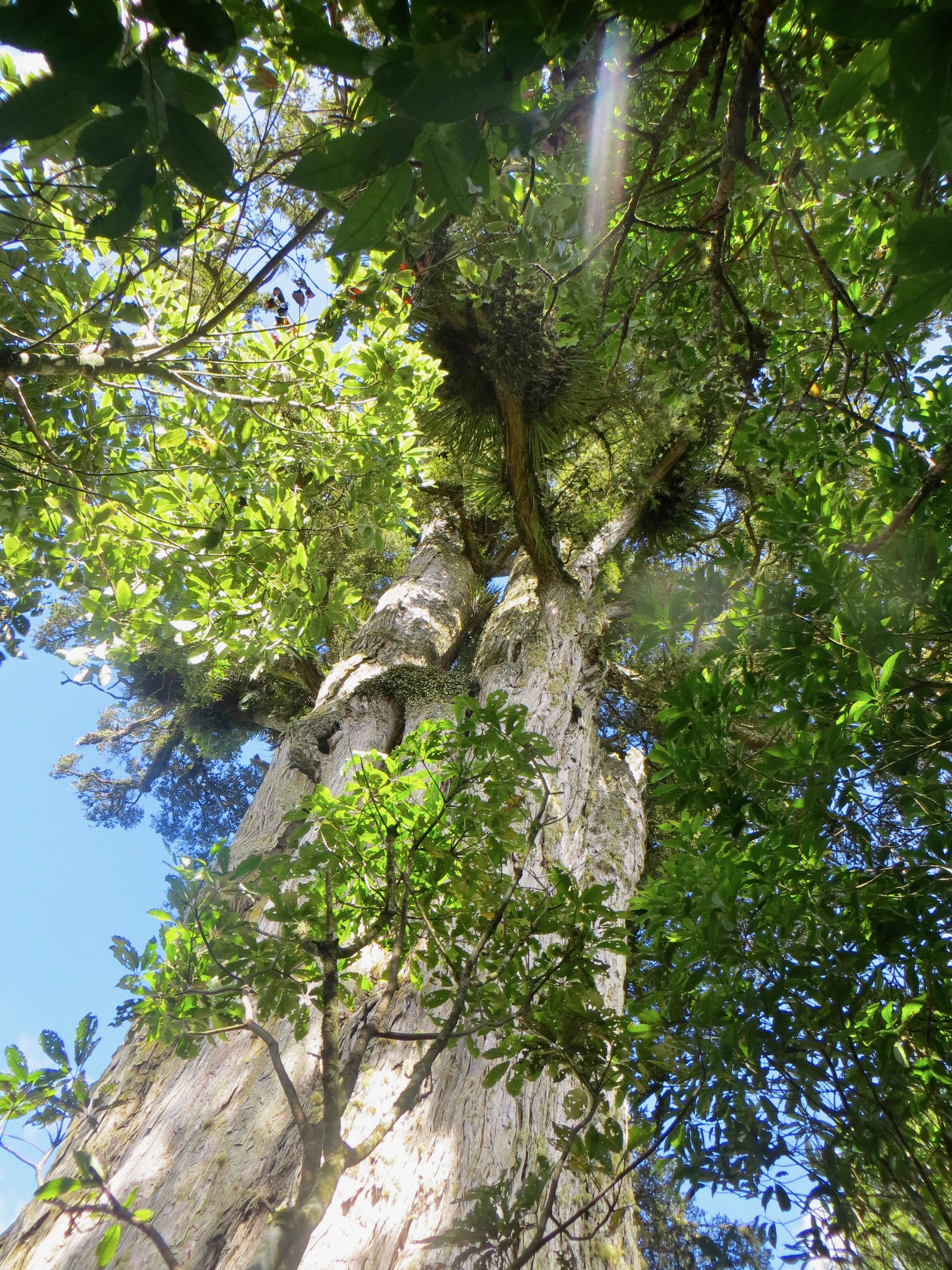
Tōtara tree.

Te Roro-o-te-rangi's brother Tunohopu had allied with Ngāti Rangiwewehi and attacked Ngāti Kea Ngāti Tuarā, so Tamamutu returned with another war party. As Tamamutu was getting the party ready for battle he uttered the whakatauki (proverb), "Strip away the sapwood (taitea), strip away the sapwood, so that the heartwood (taikākā) stands firm." Ostensibly this refers to the timber of the tōtara tree, whose sapwood decays quickly while its heartwood remains solid, but Te Rangi-pātōtō realised that he was saying that Tamamutu, as principal chief should stay still, while he should advance, so he headed off to the northwest coast of Lake Rotorua and attacked the villages of Te Awahou, Weriweri, and Puhirua, quickly seizing them.

According to Arawa sources, Te Roro-o-te-rangi gathered his forces on Mokoia and landed at Motutara, but the tohunga with the war party had premonitions of defeat and Te Roro-o-te-rangi's troops began to desert. When Tamamutu attacked, the entire army fled, leaving Te Roro-o-te-rangi and his brother Te Kata alone, to be captured by Tamamutu. According to Tūwharetoa sources, Tamamutu attacked Pukeroa (modern Rotorua city), but he was unable to take it until Te Rangi-pātōtō returned to help him. When they captured Pukeroa, Tamamutu captured Te Roro-o-te-rangi and seized the pounamu tiki called Te Ngako, as compensation for the cloak. As of 1959, this tiki was still in the possession of Tamamutu’s descendant, Ngarimu Haare.

Meanwhile, Tūwharetoa forces advanced on Ohinemutu village on Tunohopu's base at Kawaha Point, which was left practically undefended. Tunohopu fled to a nearby cave, Te Ana o Tunohopu, but in the rush his youngest son, Taioperua, was left behind and captured by Te Rangi-pātōtō. This victory was called the Battle of Tahorakurupeti.

==== War with Werewere ====
Tamamutu and Te Rangi-pātōtō went by land to Werewere's village, Papohatu, on Lake Rotongaio to get revenge for his destruction of the canoes, but were unable to capture it. They cooked Te Roro-o-te-rangi in the oven, Umukuri, buried him on the western shore of the lake, at Motu-hinahina, and departed. When they returned to attack Papohatu once more they found that Werewere had abandoned the village for Motu-o-ruru near Te Pohue.

Around a year later, Werewere gathered a war party from Heretaunga (western Hawke's Bay Region), along with his son Te Teko and Te Turuki. They advanced to Runanga and split. One party, led by Te Teko went to northern Taupō and captured Wharewaka in the Battle of Manuka-ka-ruia and then Te Karaka in the Battle of Kari-tuwhenua. Werewere and Te Turuki's party headed south and captured Te Koropupu. They did not encounter Tamamutu, who was on Motutaiko Island. According to Hoeta Te Hata, this meant that he was unaware of Werewere’s attack. According to John Te Herekiekie Grace, he was hiding from Werewere’s forces.

==== Visit of Tunohopu and peace with Arawa ====
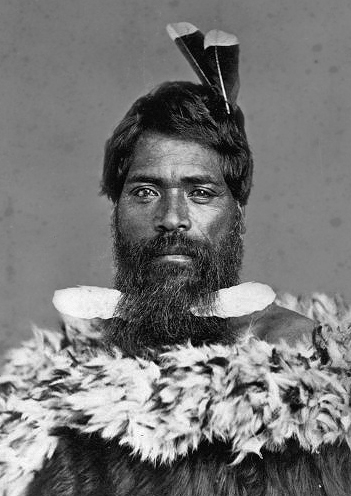
A Māori man from the Hauraki district wearing huia tail feathers in his hair (photo before 1886).

Sometime after the expedition of Tamamutu and Te Rangi-pātōtō to Lake Rotorua, the chief Tunohopu, who was based at Ohinemutu on Kawaha Point on the shore of the lake, learnt that his son Taioperua had not been killed by Te Rangi-pātōtō, as he had thought, but had been taken prisoner and was still alive. Instead of trying to lead a war party to try to reclaim him, he dressed in shabby clothes and went to Tamamutu’s village at Motutere all on his own. When he arrived, Tunohopu made it all the way into Tamamutu’s house without being recognised. There he announced why he had come, to Tamamutu’s great surprise.

Tamamutu agreed to return Taioperua, but needed the assent of the village to do this. He gifted Tunohopu the clothing of a chief and gave him a huia feather to put in his hair – the traditional symbol of chieftainship. Then Tamamutu went out into the village and shouted that a war party had snuck into the village. The people gathered in alarm, but then they realised that Tunohopu was within Tamamutu’s house and therefore under his protection. They agreed to return his son, showered him with presents, and made a peace with the Te Arawa of Rotorua, which proved permanent.

=== Expedition to Hawke's Bay against Te Kahu-o-te-rangi ===
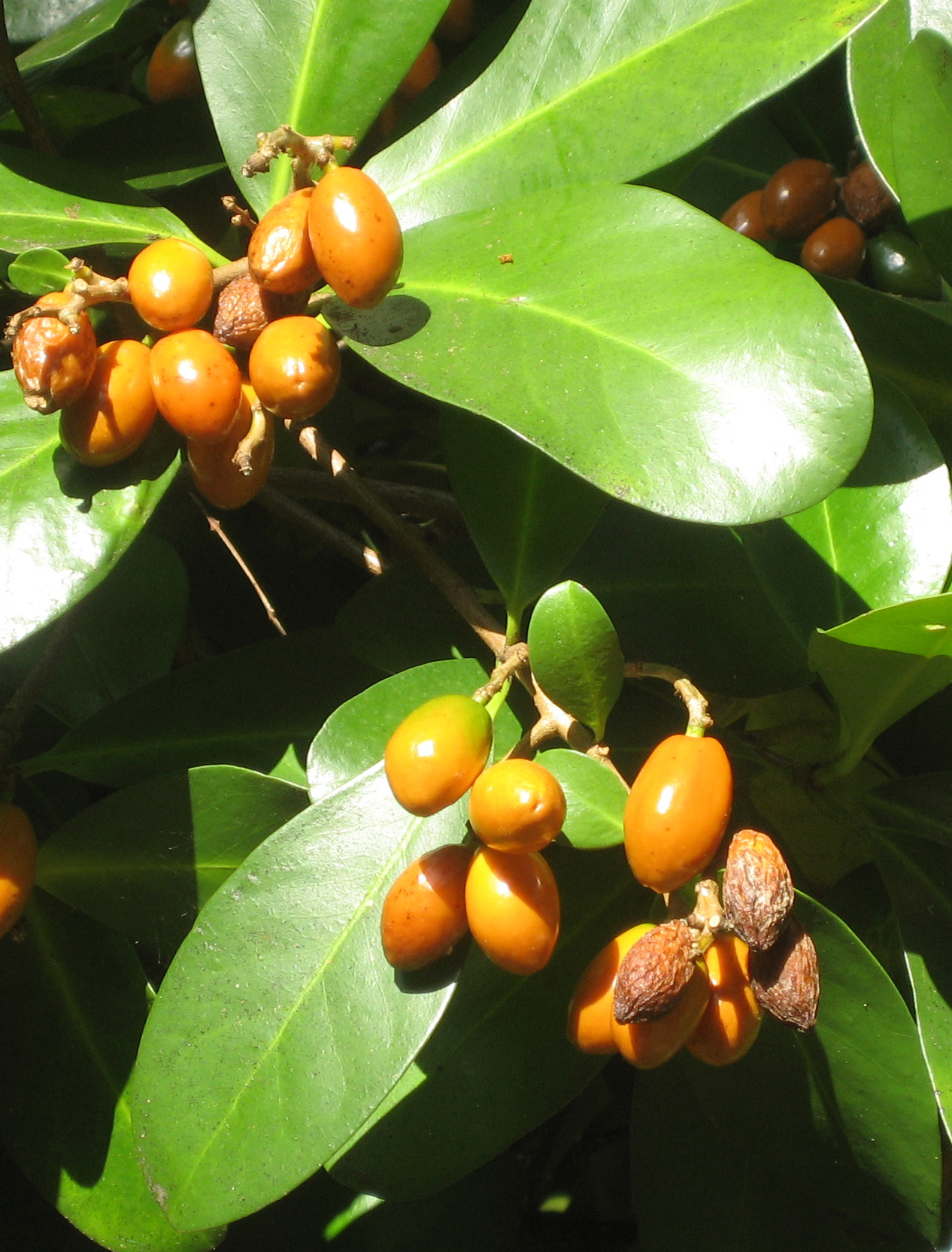
Karaka berries.

Tamamutu's cousin, Nga-pare-taua, married a man from the Ngāti Kurumokihi hapū of Ngāti Kahungunu and moved to Tangoio in Hawke's Bay, where she was killed in a raid by Te Kahu-o-te-Rangi, a chief of Ngāti Pāhauwera who was based at Mohaka. When the news of her death reached Taupō, Nga-pare-taua’s brother Te Hiko-o-te-rangi was distraught, so he and Tamamutu formed a war party and went to Tangoio, where they were joined by some survivors of the raid and set off to get revenge on Te Kahu-o-te-rangi. They proceeded to the mouth of the Waikare River, where Te Kahu had a fortress called Whare-kiri, but since Te Kahu-o-te-rangi was not there they decided to continue on to Mohaka, Te Kahu-o-te-rangi's main base.

Tamamutu sent two men from Tangoio down to the cliffs by the sea in order to investigate whether it would be possible for the war party to pass along the beach to Mohaka. At low tide, this is possible, but the two men did not want Tamamutu to continue and utterly destroy Te Kahu-o-te-rangi, who was related to them, so they lied, saying that the sea made the route impassable. To make the lie believable, they dunked their clothes in salt water, so that it would seem that the sea had blocked their passage. Therefore, Tamamutu sacked Whare-kiri and returned home.

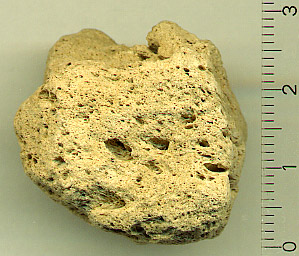
A lump of pumice.

Tamamutu brought some karaka berries back with him from Whare-kiri and planted them at Pākā Bay. The glade that grew from these berries was named Whare-kiri and they were still there as of 1842.

On the way back to Taupō, Tamamutu came to the fortress of Werewere at Motu-o-rūrū and found that he had already died. He attacked the fortress anyway, captured Werewere's son Te Teko, and brought him back to Taupō. He also searched for Werewere's corpse, but could not find it. Therefore, when he returned to Taupō, he carved a head out of pumice, called it 'the Head of Werewere' and made it the marker of his rubbish heap.

=== Campaign against Ngāti Pikiao and death ===
Haukeka of Ngāti Pikiao led a war party to attack the people of Ngāti Tūwharetoa in western Taupo, killed the chief Pataua, and returned to their base at Motutawa. Tamamutu responded by leading a war party to Lake Rotorua, allying with the Tuhourangi people, and attacking Ngati Pikiao. He captured, killed, and ate two important chiefs, Te Roi and Tutaki, while they were farming at Wairau or setting fihing nets at Te Kumikumi, near Motutawa. Ngati Pikiao chased Tamamutu's forces along the Whakapoungakau Range and killed him at the Battle of Taherekakareao. Tamamutu's grandson Meremere attempted to get revenge for the killling, but was defeated and killed by Haukeka.

== Family ==
Tamamutu married Hiko, a descendant of Tia, with whom he had a son, Kapawa, who succeeded him as paramount chief of Tūwharetoa. Kapawa led a peaceful life and was succeeded by his own son, Meremere, who was succeeded in turn by his son, Te Rangituamatotoru.

He also married Raukato and Urututu.

A further son, Te Māri, was the ancestor of Te Uamairangi.

== Bibliography ==
- Te Hata, Hoeta; Fletcher, H. J. (1917). "Ngati-Tuhare-toa occupation of Taupo-nui-a-tia". Journal of the Polynesian Society. 26: 19–30, 66–69, 91–99, 180–187.
- Grace, John Te Herekiekie (1959). Tuwharetoa: The history of the Maori people of the Taupo District. Auckland [N.Z.]: A.H. & A.W. Reed.
- Stafford, D.M. (1967). Te Arawa: A History of the Arawa People. Rotorua, New Zealand: A.H. & A.W. Reed.
- Jones, Pei Te Hurinui; Biggs, Bruce (2004). Ngā iwi o Tainui : nga koorero tuku iho a nga tuupuna = The traditional history of the Tainui people. Auckland [N.Z.]: Auckland University Press. ISBN 1869403312.
