= Tūwharetoa (disambiguation) =

Tūwharetoa may refer to:

- Ngāti Tūwharetoa, a Māori iwi
- Tūwharetoa i te Aupōuri, eponymous ancestor of the iwi
- Tūwharetoa a Turiroa, a seventeenth century Māori rangatira
- Tuwharetoa FM, the radio station of the iwi
- Tūwharetoa (whare), a marae at Matatā
