= Whiti-patatō =

Whiti-patatō was a rangatira (chieftain) of Ngāti Raukawa, based at Whare-puhunga in the Waikato region of New Zealand, who led an attack on Ngāti Tūwharetoa to avenge the death of the Ngāti Raukawa rangatira, Te Ata-inutai, probably in the mid-seventeenth century.

== Life ==
The surviving sources give no details of Whiti-patatō's descent or origins.

=== Murder of Te Ata-inutai ===
Te Ata-inutai was an elderly rangatira of Ngāti Raukawa, based at Whare-puhunga, who had once led an attack on Ngāti Tūwharetoa, during which he had killed the Tūwharetoa ariki Waikari, but then forged a peace by marrying his daughter Waitapu to the Tūwharetoa rangatira Te Rangi-ita. On the birth of his first grandson from this marriage, Te Ata-inutai travelled to Marae-kōwhai in order to perform the tohi baptismal ritual, but he was murdered by a group of Tūwharetoa led by Kewha on his journey home, as vengeance for his killing of Waikari.

=== Attack on Tūwharetoa ===
Locations in Whiti-patatō's campaign
1 Mount Whare-puhunga
2 Tīhoi
3 Marae-kōwhai (near Mokai)
4 Rangatira Point
5 Wharewaka

The youngest son of Waitapu and Te Rangi-ita, Tū-te-tawhā Whare-oneone, learnt of his maternal grandfather's murder and travelled to Whare-puhunga, where he persuaded the Ngāti Raukawa to form a war party and attack Tūwharetoa in order to avenge Te Ata-inutai's death. Whiti-patatō was chosen to lead the war party.

Te Rangi-ita learnt that the war party was coming from Tū-te-tawhā and called on Whiti-patatō to lead his force to Marae-kōwhai quickly, but he stopped in the area of Kaingaroa, saying "Not yet! I am going to rove (tihoi) about this plain" or "my path must be a hidden one (tihoi), from which the plain received the name Tīhoi.

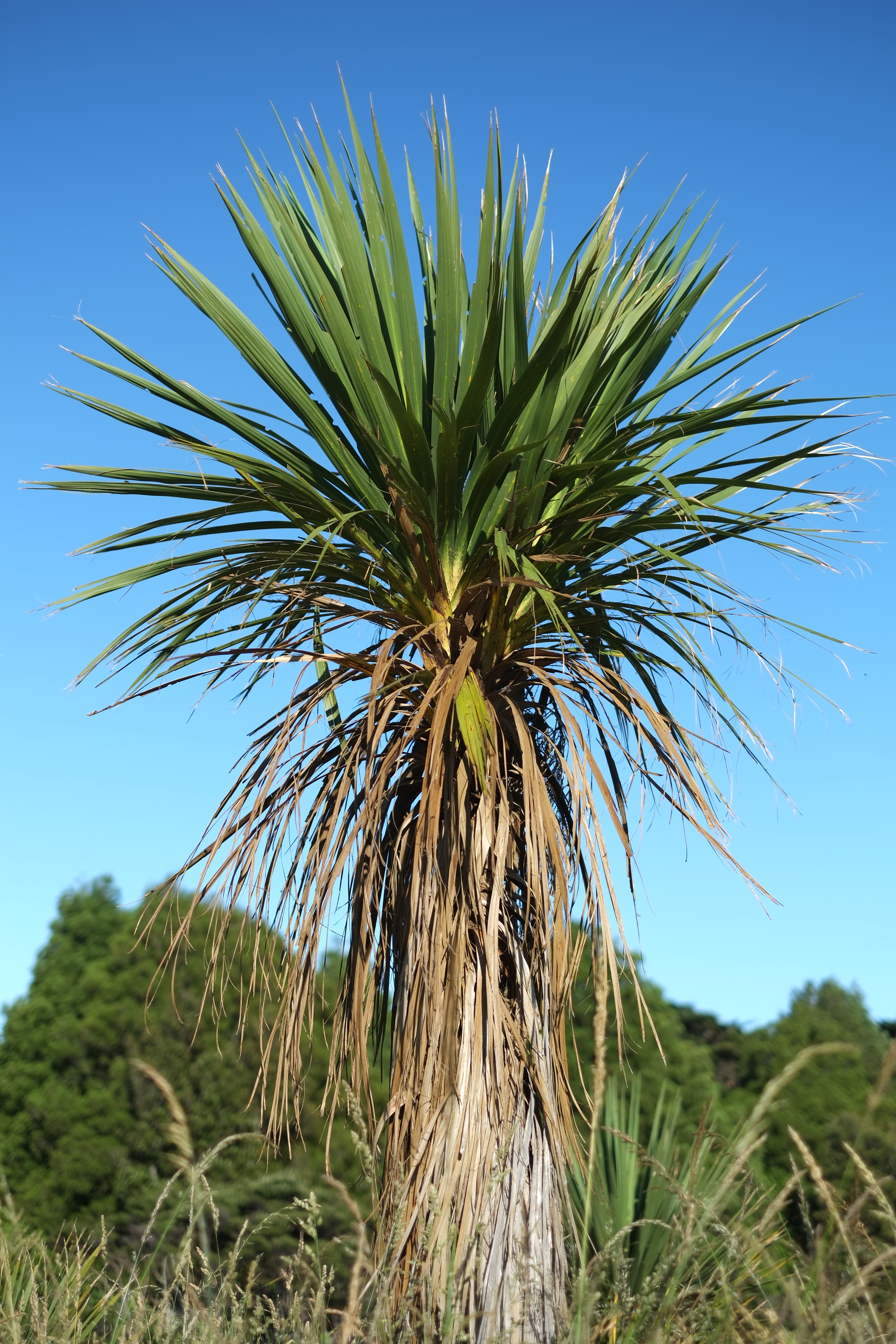
Tī (cabbage-tree).

Eventually, however, Whiti-patatō reached the settlement of Tuhinga-mata / Pōnui located near Rangatira Point at the northeastern end of Lake Taupō. In order to scout out the place, he climbed up on a hill above the village, which was close enough that he could see into the village. As he was standing there, he heard the voices of people in the village. They had spotted him on the hill, but as it was dusk they could not see him clearly and they were arguing about whether he was a warrior or just a tī (cabbage-tree). Whiti-patatō stood completely still for a long time. He was so badly bitten by sandflies, that he had to call out to his comrades, who were lying on the ground nearby, to scratch his legs. Eventually, he planted his taiaha spear in the ground, put his pūreke ('rain cape') over the top of it, so that it would look like a tī, then slowly sunk down on his knees and scarpered down the hill to his camp.

In the night, Tū-te-tawhā entered the village and took a turn on sentry duty, singing out a song that cryptically communicated to Whiti-patatō that the local rangatira, Tūwharetoa a Turiroa was not in the village, but in a cave on the shore of Lake Taupō called Matanuku and Matarangi. Just before dawn the next morning, Whiti-patatō led his forces in an attack on Tuhinga-mata. The village was completely unprepared for an attack and the people broke and ran. Whiti-patatō went searching for Tūwharetoa a Turiroa and found him in the cave. Tūwharetoa had just placed his child on his wife's back and directed her to swim across the lake to safety, which she did, coming to shore at Wharewaka point on the other side of Tapuae-haruru Bay (a distance of about 3 km). Whiti-patatō came up behind him, leaving him with no escape. He turned around and asked Whiti-patatō why he had attacked. When Whiti-patatō told him that they had come to avenge the murder of Te Ata-inutai, Tūwhare-toa-a-turiroa replied, "It is well. The cause is just," and handed his patu (club), Paroparo-houmea to Whiti-patatō, who struck him dead.

== Sources ==
The earliest published account of Whiti-patatō's raid occurs in a 1904 article by Walter Edward Gudgeon, with no indication of the sources on which it is based. A detailed account appears as part of a series of articles on Tūwharetoa history by Hoata Te Hata, published between 1916 and 1918. Much of this account is followed by John Te Herekiekie Grace in his 1959 history of Tūwharetoa. Pei Te Hurinui Jones gives a similar account, which he heard from Tuturu Hōne Tere of Ngāti Tūwharetoa and Ngāti Raukawa descent.

== Bibliography ==
- Locke, Samuel (1882). "Historical Traditions of Taupo and East Coast Tribes". Transactions and Proceedings of the Royal Society of New Zealand. 15: 433–459.
- Gudgeon, W. E. (1904). "The Toa Taua or Warrior". Journal of the Polynesian Society. 13: 238–264.
- Te Hata, Hoeta; Fletcher, H. J. (1916). "Ngati-Tuhare-toa occupation of Taupo-nui-a-tia". Journal of the Polynesian Society. 25: 104–116, 150–162.
- Te Hata, Hoeta; Fletcher, H. J. (1917). "Ngati-Tuhare-toa occupation of Taupo-nui-a-tia". Journal of the Polynesian Society. 26: 19–30, 69–99, 180–187.
- Te Hata, Hoeta; Fletcher, H. J. (1918). "Ngati-Tuhare-toa occupation of Taupo-nui-a-tia". Journal of the Polynesian Society. 27: 38–46.
- Grace, John Te Herekiekie (1959). Tuwharetoa: The history of the Maori people of the Taupo District. Auckland [N.Z.]: A.H. & A.W. Reed.
- Ngata, Apriana; Te Hurinui, Pei (1961). Nga Moteatea: he maramara rere no nga waka maha. He mea kohikohi na A. T. Ngata. Na Pei Te Hurinui I whakapaakehaa, Part II. Wellington [N.Z.]: Polynesian Society.
- Phillips, F. L. (1989). Nga tohu a Tainui / Landmarks of Tainui: A Geographical Record of Tainui Traditional History. Otorohanga: Tohu Publishers.
- Jones, Pei Te Hurinui; Biggs, Bruce (2004). Ngā iwi o Tainui : nga koorero tuku iho a nga tuupuna = The traditional history of the Tainui people. Auckland [N.Z.]: Auckland University Press. ISBN 1869403312.
