= Ian Uttley =

- Born: Ian Neill Uttley; 3 December 1941 Christchurch, New Zealand
- Died: 15 September 2015 (aged 73) near Te Pohue, New Zealand
- Height: 1.73 m (5 ft 8 in)
- Weight: 67 kg (148 lb)
- School: Wellington College
- University: Victoria University of Wellington
- Notable relative: Kenneth Uttley (father)
- Occupation: Oil company executive

Rugby union career
- Position: Centre
Provincial / State sides
Years	Team	Apps	(Points)
1961–65, 68	Wellington		
1966	Auckland		
1967	Hawke's Bay		
International career
Years	Team	Apps	(Points)
1963	New Zealand	2	(0)

Ian Neill Uttley (3 December 1941 – 15 September 2015) was a New Zealand rugby union player. A centre three-quarter, Uttley represented Wellington, Auckland, and Hawke's Bay at a provincial level. He was a member of the New Zealand national side, the All Blacks, in two matches in Auckland in May 1963, both of them Tests against the touring England team. He was known as the "Grey Ghost".

His father, Kenneth Uttley, represented Otago and New Zealand Universities in rugby union, and also played first-class cricket for Otago and Wellington.

Uttley and his wife Christine died on 15 September 2015, when their vehicle went off the side of State Highway 5 near Te Pohue, overcorrected, and crossed into the path of a logging truck. Police suspect a third vehicle may have been involved.
