= Werewere =

Seventeenth-century Māori chieftain

Places in the life of Werewere
1 Huka Falls
2 Rotorua
3 Papohatu on Lake Rotongaio
4 Motu-o-rūrū
5 Rūnanga
6 Te Koropupu
7 Te Karaka
8 Motutaiko Island
9 Wharewaka
10 Te Nguru

Werewere was a seventeenth-century Māori rangatira (chieftain) of Ngāti Kurapoto and Ngāti Tūwharetoa from the region around Lake Taupō, New Zealand. Werewere joined the dominant chieftain of Ngāti Tūwharetoa, Tamamutu, on an expedition against Rotorua, but the two men clashed and Tamamutu expelled him from the Taupō region. Werewere settled at Motu-o-rūrū in Heretaunga (western Hawke's Bay Region), from which Werewere launched a successful raid on Taupō. He died peacefully at Motu-o-rūrū.

== Life ==
Werewere was the son of Tūwharetoa a Turiroa and Hine-te-ao. Through his father, he was a direct descendant of Tuamatua, leader of the Arawa canoe. His mother was killed when he was young during an attack by Ngāti Raukawa forces led by Te Ata-inutai. He had one full sister, Tawhanga-rangi, and a half-brother, Te Urunga.

=== Conflict with Tamamutu ===
Werewere joined Tamamutu and Te Rangi-patoto on an expedition to Rotorua against Te Roro-o-te-rangi. On the way to Rotorua, the party encountered two young men called Tiki and Kaui and killed them. These men were relatives of Tamamutu and he had been warned by Werewere, when the expedition set out that he should not kill them. When Werewere found out, he went to Hipa-patua and cut the expeditions canoes free, sending them over the Huka Falls to destruction.

When Tamamutu and Te Rangi-patoto returned to Hipa-patua and found that their canoes had all been destroyed, they were furious and they went by land to attack Werewere's village, Papohatu, on Lake Rotongaio, but were unable to capture it. When they returned to attack Papohatu once more they found that Werewere had abandoned the village for Motu-o-rūrū, located on the Mangaone River near Te Pōhue in Hawke's Bay.

=== Invasion of Taupō ===
Later, Werewere gathered a war party from Heretaunga (western Hawke's Bay Region), along with his son Te Teko and Te Turuki. They advanced to Rūnanga and split into two parties. One party, led by Werewere and Te Turuki headed south and captured Te Koropupu and then Te Karaka in the Battle of Kari-tuwhenua. They did not capture any chiefs during this battles and they did not encounter Tamamutu, who was on Motutaiko Island. According to Hoeta Te Hata, this meant that he was unaware of Werewere’s attack. According to John Te Herekiekie Grace, he was hiding from Werewere’s forces.

Meanwhile, the other party, led by Te Teko went to northern Taupō and captured Wharewaka in the Battle of Manuka-ka-ruia. In this battle, Te Teko captured two of wives of Tū-te-tawhā Whare-oneone, Raukato and Urututu. As a result, Tū-te-tawhā came in a canoe to Wharewaka, landed and asked Te Teko to return his wives; he returned Raukato, but had already given Urututu to one of his men as a wife. In thanks for the return of Raukato, Tū-te-tawhā left a kahu kurī (dog-skin cloak).

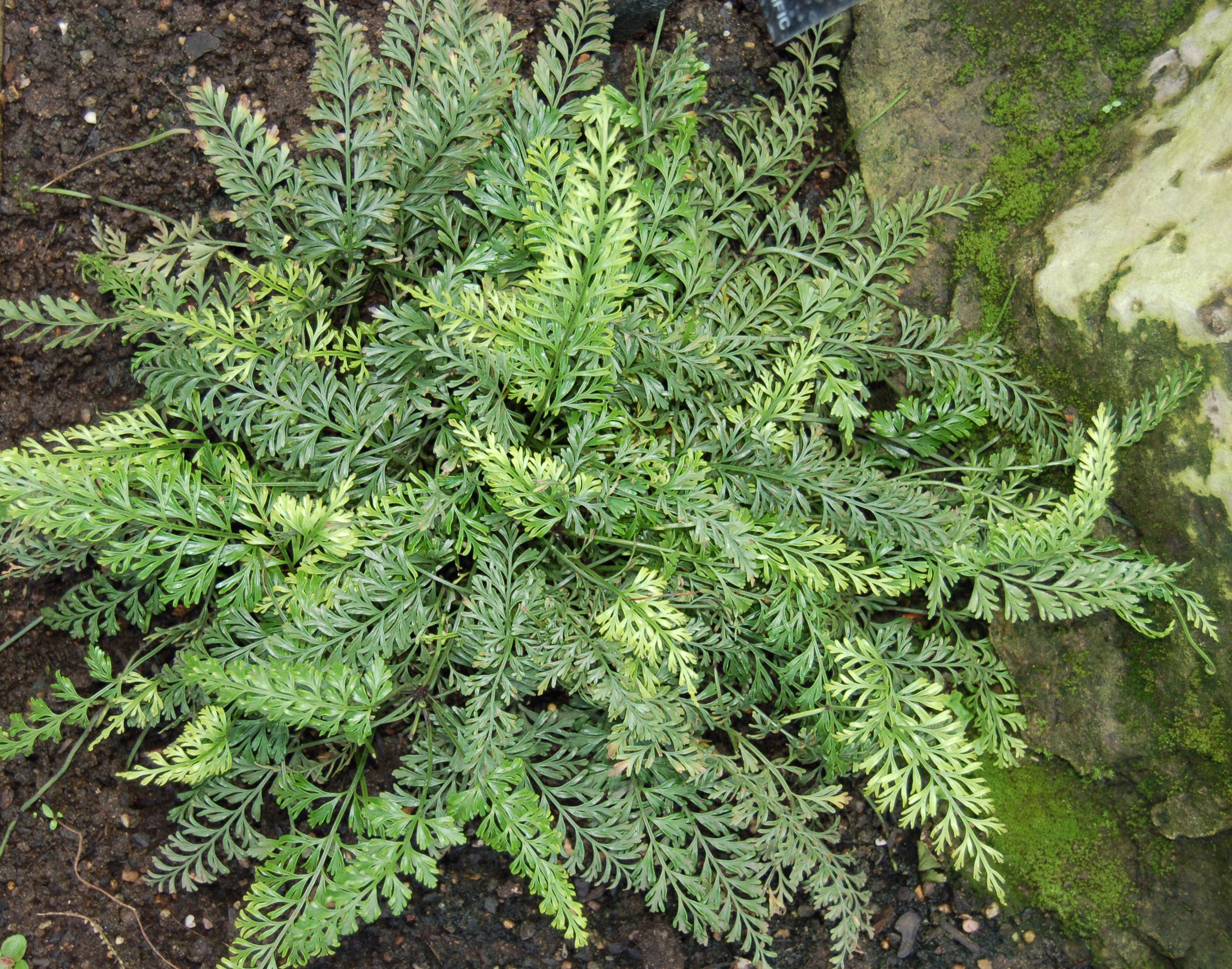
mauku fern.

The whole party returned to the east, crossing the Mohaka River at Te Nguru ford. Overnight, the man who had been given Urututu, told her to gather stones, firewood, and mauku fern. She realised that these supplies were going to be used to cook her. After she was ordered to light the oven, she jumped into the Mohaka River and her body was never found. According to Hoeta Te Hata, she became the chief taniwha of Lake Taupo, Horomatangi, Te Ihi, and Ara-tukutuku.

=== Death ===
Tamamutu subsequently led an expedition to Hawke's Bay to seek revenge, but when he reached Werewere's fortress at Motu-o-rūrū, he found that Werewere died sometime before. Tamamutu attacked the fortress anyway, captured Werewere's son Te Teko, whom he brought back to Taupō. He also searched for Werewere's corpse, but could not find it. Therefore, when he returned to Taupō, he carved a head out of pumice, called it 'the Head of Werewere', and made it the marker of his rubbish heap.

== Family ==
Werewere had two sons, Te Teko and Pareawa.

== Bibliography ==
- Te Hata, Hoeta; Fletcher, H. J. (1917). "Ngati-Tuhare-toa occupation of Taupo-nui-a-tia". Journal of the Polynesian Society. 26: 19–30, 69–99, 180–187.
- Grace, John Te Herekiekie (1959). Tuwharetoa: The history of the Maori people of the Taupo District. Auckland [N.Z.]: A.H. & A.W. Reed.
