= Werewere (disambiguation) =

Werewere may refer to:

- Werewere (chieftain), a seventeenth century Māori chieftain
- Ngāti Werewere, a subtribe (hapū) of the Ngāti Hauā tribe in New Zealand
- Werewere, a meeting house (marae) affiliated with Ngāti Hauā and Ngāti Werewere in Morrinsville, New Zealand
