= Ken Uttley =

New Zealand cricketer and pathologist

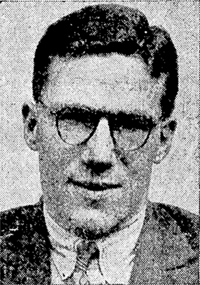
- Uttley in 1937

Personal information
- Full name: Kenneth Frank McNeill Uttley
- Born: 21 August 1913; Oamaru, North Otago, New Zealand
- Died: 15 June 1973 (aged 59); Palmerston North, Manawatū District, New Zealand
- Batting: Right-handed
- Role: Batsman
- Relatives: Ian Uttley (son)

Domestic team information
- Years: Team
- 1928/29: Wairarapa
- 1933/34–1938/39: Otago
- 1940/41–1945/46: Canterbury
- 1951/52: Wellington

Career statistics
Competition	First-class
Matches	37
Runs scored	2,053
Batting average	31.10
100s/50s	3/12
Top score	145
Catches/stumpings	20/–
- Source: CricketArchive, 18 July 2019

Kenneth Frank McNeill Uttley (21 August 1913 – 15 June 1973) was a New Zealand cricketer and pathologist.

== Life and career ==
Uttley was born at Oamaru in North Otago in 1913. He was educated at Wairarapa College and Southland Boys' High School―in both cases his father was the headmaster―before going up to Otago University to study medicine. He played Hawke Cup cricket for Wairarapa whilst at school during the 1928–29 season and the following year, aged 16, played for the side against the touring England Test team, making scores of one and 19 not out. A fine all-round sportsman, after moving to Invercargill he captained the Southland Boys' cricket team and was a centre in the rugby team as well as competing in athletics. He played cricket for Southland in both of the two years he spent at the school.

At university Uttley continued to play both cricket and rugby. He made his debut for the provincial rugby side in 1932 at age 19, playing for three seasons before giving up the game after the 1934 season. He represented the New Zealand University side in three home Test matches against Sydney University during 1934. He played cricket for the University Cricket Club, captaining the side by the start of the 1937–38 season.

Uttley's senior cricket debut came for Otago during the 1933–34 season. He played 19 times for the provincial side, scoring 1,316 runs for the team and scoring all three of his first-class centuries for the province. His highest score was 145 made against Canterbury during the 1936–37 season and by the end of 1937 he was considered one of the best batsmen and fielders in New Zealand. A right-handed batsman, he went on to play for Canterbury and Wellington in a career which lasted until the 1951–52 season. In 37 first-class matches he scored 2,053 runs.

He captained Otago in 1937–38, when he was the highest scorer in the Plunket Shield, with 420 runs at an average of 70.00. In the second match, against Auckland, he scored 132 and 138 and won the Redpath Cup for New Zealand batsman of the season.

Uttley married Jessie Neill in Dunedin in January 1939. Later that year he qualified as a doctor at the University of Otago. From 1940 he trained as a pathologist at Christchurch Hospital, where he established the blood bank. He later worked at hospitals in Timaru and Palmerston North, where he died suddenly in 1973, aged 59. His son Ian Uttley played for the New Zealand national rugby union team in 1963.
