= Waipātiki Beach =

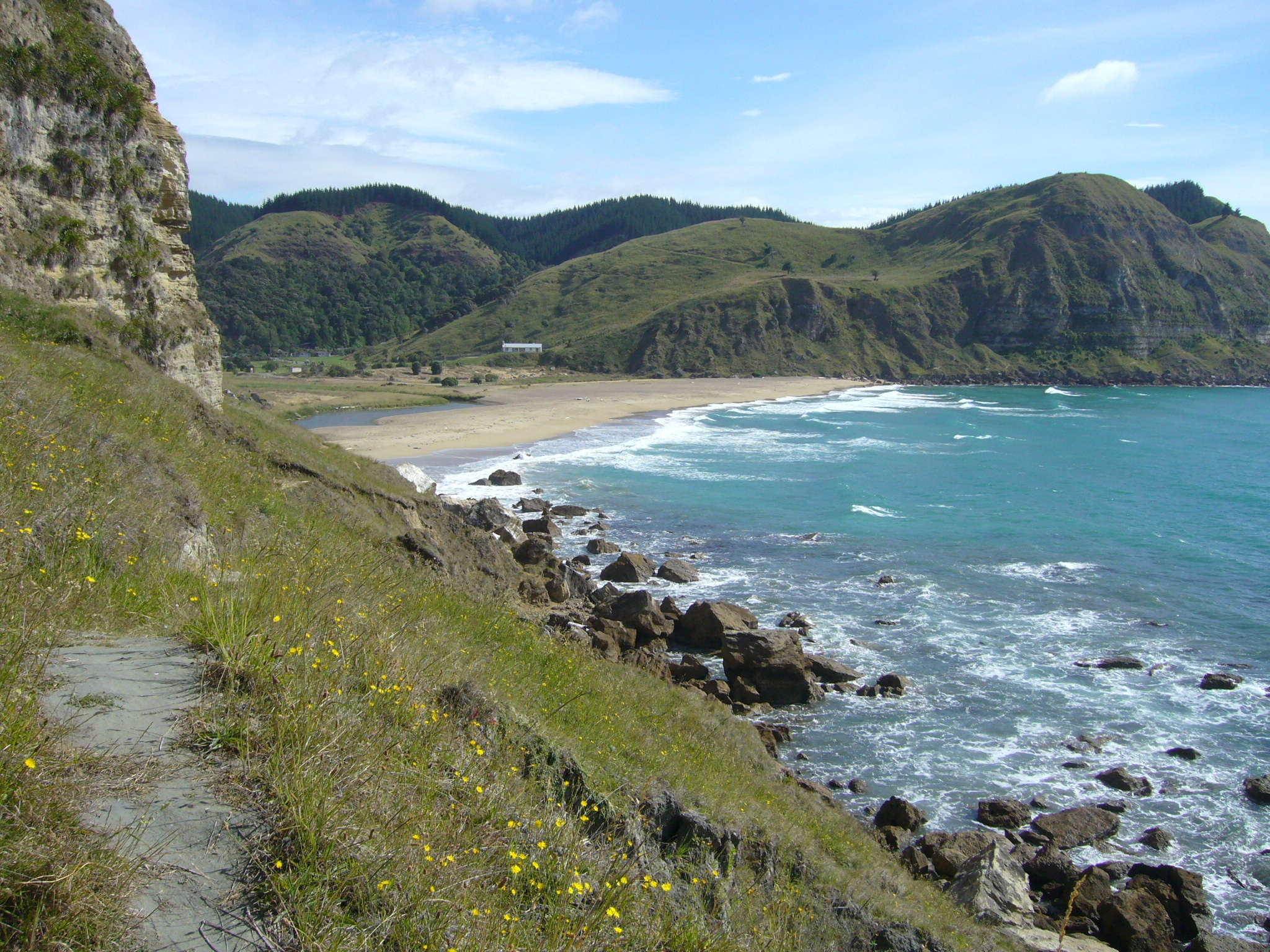
- Waipātiki Beach from the south

- Location within North Island
- Coordinates: 39°18′S 176°58′E
- Country: New Zealand
- Region: Hawke's Bay
- Territorial authority: Hastings District

Population
  - Total: 24

Waipātiki Beach is a small coastal village in the Hastings District and Hawke's Bay Region of New Zealand's North Island. It is situated in a little valley at the end of a road that branches off the main road from Napier to Gisborne (SH 2) and that finally, after 11 km, leads to a small sandy beach; first Tangoio Rd, then Waipātiki Road.

Waipātiki Beach lies nearly exactly north of Napier, some 20 km, as the crow flies, and is a small beach side community with alternative lifestyle residents (43 households in 2005). There are also many holidaymakers over the summer period.

Outside the village lies the commercially exploited Waipātiki forest, but close to the village are some important remnants of protected native bush. There is also a small campsite, the Waipātiki Beach Farm Park.

The village's name comes from the Māori-language word Waipātiki, meaning “water of the flounder”. The area was once an estuarine valley, well populated in pre-European times because the estuary was a rich source of flounder Rhombosolea plebeia. The 1931 Hawke's Bay earthquake lifted the flats and a stream system formed.

== Demographics ==
Waipātiki Beach had a population of 24 in the 2023 census. Detailed demographics are given at Tangoio.

== Waipātiki Domain ==
Waipātiki Domain is situated at the edge of the village on the northern side of the valley off the beach road. This is an area of regenerated native New Zealand bush. The area is fenced (to protect it against goats) and a pest control program is set up to eradicate possums. This kind of coastal bush is hard to find in Hawke's Bay these days. The forest is dominated by kahikatea. Some of these are thought to be around 400 years old. Two very large trees are perhaps 600 years old; the larger tree has a circumference of 7.4 metres. The tracks through the domain lead you through impressive archways formed by the fronds of the nīkau palm. Titoki, karaka and kawakawa are also present. Birds found in the domain include tūī, korimako, pīwakawaka, kererū, rirorio, pīpīwharauroa and ruru. There is a 15-minute walk through the domain. There is a side walk up the hill with a view overlooking the valley. The Domain is managed by Hastings District Council.

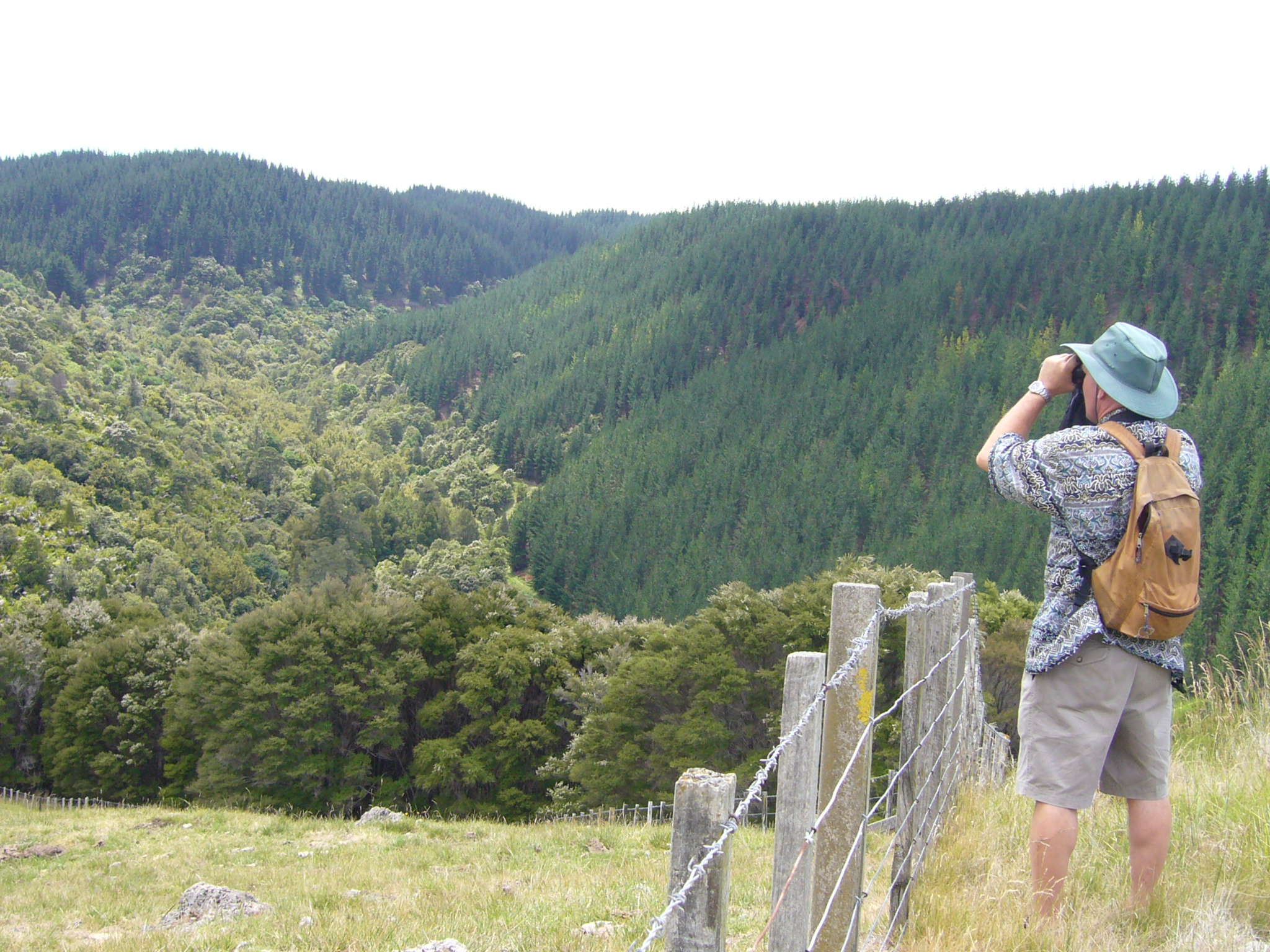
Waipatiki Reserve from the road. On the right, the commercial Pinus radiata forest

== Waipatiki Scenic Reserve ==
Waipatiki Scenic Reserve is managed by the New Zealand Department of Conservation. It lies at the head of the valley and covers 64 ha. Like Waipatiki Domain this reserve contains an important piece of remaining coastal kahikatea forest. In the lower part nikau palms are dominant. At the side of the streams delicate lichens hang in long curtains from the trees. Higher up kānuka is abundant. Titoki, tawa, karaka and rewarewa are also found. In the gullies and streams rimu, mataī, kahikatea, ponga and makomako are present. Through the reserve leads a part of the original Māori track between Napier and Wairoa. In 1860 a bridle track was cut to take the mail from Napier to Gisborne by pack horse. Pack trains used the route for nearly 40 years until 1899 when an inland route via Tutira was constructed. In the past goats and sheep have grazed the area, but since being fenced regeneration of the vegetation has taken place.

There are entrances from Waipātiki Road and Aropaoanui Road.

== Southern coastal walk ==
From the beach a well maintained track leads south along the limestone cliffs. After a 15-minute walk a small bay is reached. The track continues further south. The walk gives excellent views over Hawke's Bay, from Māhia Peninsula to Cape Kidnappers. Birds that can be seen include gannets (from the gannetry at Cape Kidnappers), gulls, terns, oystercatchers and shags.

== Northern coastal walk ==
From Waipātiki Beach a well-maintained track leads north to Aropaoanui beach. The walk takes about an hour each way, and follows the lower part of the limestone cliffs. These cliffs rise up to 100 metres high and form an impressive backdrop for views over Hawke's Bay.

== Redwood reserve ==
In 1974 a small part of the commercial Waipātiki forest was planted with redwoods to create the Stuart McKinley Reserve.
