= Tūwharetoa a Turiroa =

Māori chieftain

Locations in the life of Tūwharetoa a Turiroa
1 Pōnui, Rangatira Point
2 Whakāngiangi
3 Wharewaka

Tūwharetoa a Turiroa was a Māori rangatira (chieftain) of Ngāti Kurapoto and Ngāti Tūwharetoa from the region around Lake Taupō, New Zealand. He was involved in multiple conflicts between Ngāti Tūwharetoa and Ngāti Raukawa, and his death, around the middle of the seventeenth century, marked the end of a cycle of revenge sparked by the Ngāti Tama–Ngāti Tūwharetoa War

== Life ==
Tūwharetoa a Turiroa was the son of Turiroa and Taniwha-pare-tuiri. He had one half-brother, Umu-ariki. Through his father, he was a direct descendant of Tuamatua, the shared ancestor of Te Arawa and Ngāti Tūwharetoa. The final part of his name, 'a Turiroa' ("of Turiroa"), distinguishes him from his distant cousin Tūwharetoa i te Aupōuri, the ancestor of the Ngāti Tūwharetoa iwi, who lived some time earlier.

Tūwharetoa a Turiroa made his base at Pōnui on Rangatira Point, which forms the western arm of Tapuae-haruru Bay (location of modern Taupō township).

=== Attack of Te Ata-inutai ===
At the end of the Ngāti Tama–Ngāti Tūwharetoa War, the Ngāti Tūwharetoa ariki, Waikari had attacked and killed the Ngāti Raukawa rangatira Poutū who had originally sparked the war by giving the leaders of Ngāti Tama a mere (club) called Paroparo-roumeia, with which they killed the Ngāti Tūwharetoa ariki, Rua-wehea. Poutū's cousin, Te Ata-inutai gathered a war party in order to get revenge for this killing. He attacked Pōnui and killed Tūwharetoa's wife Hine-te-ao, but Tūwharetoa himself eluded them and made it to Whakāngiangi, where he warned Ngāti Tūwharetoa of the invasion.

=== Visit to Pahautea ===
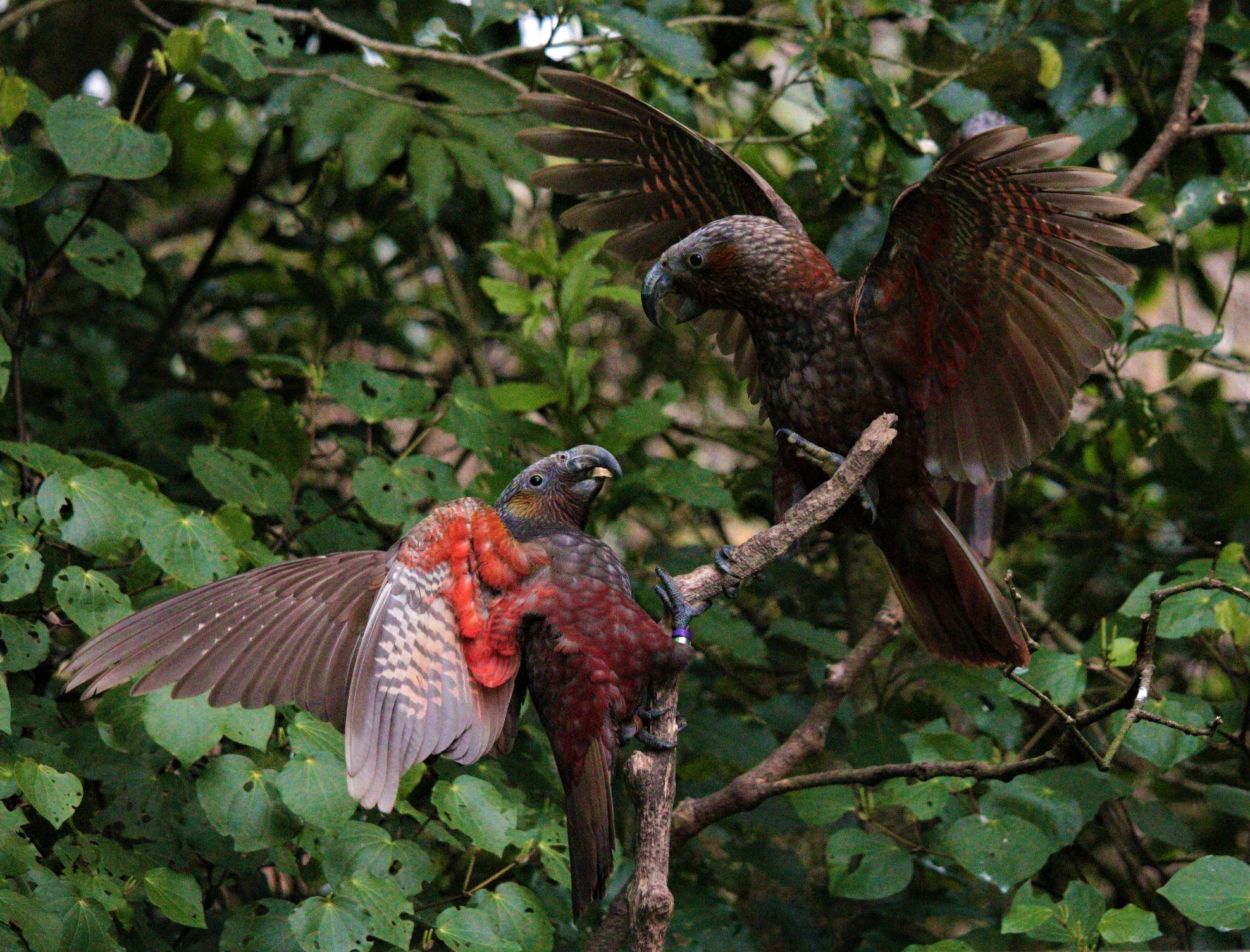
A pair of North Island kākā.

Later, Tūwharetoa a Turiroa went to Pahautea (located on the modern State Highway 5, between Taupo township and the Rangitaiki River), with his daughter Tawhanga-rangi and a slave, in order to prepare and preserve some kākā. One evening, after they had roasted and eaten several kākā, Tawhanga-rangi wanted water and Tūwharetoa told the slave to go and get some from the Rangitaiki River, but the slave ignored him, so Tūwharetoa took a calabash and got it himself. He offered the slave some of the water, but the slave said he was not thirsty. Later, when Tūwharetoa and Tawhanga-rangi had gone to bed, the slave snuck over to the calabash and took a drink, but Tūwharetoa, who had only been pretending to sleep, heard him and killed him for his earlier disobedience.

=== Death ===
A member of Ngāti Tūwharetoa murdered Te Ata-inutai in revenge for his earlier attack. In revenge for that killing, Te Ata-inutai's grandson, Tū-te-tawhā, eventually organised an attack on Ngāti Tūwharetoa. The Ngāti Raukawa rangatira, Whiti-patatō, led his force to Tuhinga-mata, which was completely unprepared for an attack. The people broke and ran.

Tūwharetoa a Turiroa was not in the village, since he had taken to sleeping in a cave called Matanuku and Matarangi in the cliff overlooking Lake Taupō. When he realised that they were being attacked told his wife Rauhato to take their son and swim across Tapuae-haruru Bay to Wharewaka (now a suburb of Taupō township), a distance of about 3 km, to safety. Despite the cold, she successfully made it across the bay, coming to shore at Te Tara-o-te-marama, the home of her mother Hine-kaharoa. The son was thereafter known as Te Urunga ("the pillow"), because he had been tied to Rauhato's shoulders like a pillow.

Whiti-patatō came up behind Tūwharetoa, leaving him with no escape, so he turned around and asked Whiti-patatō why he had attacked. When Whiti-patatō told him that they had come to avenge the murder of Te Ata-inutai, Tūwharetoa a Turiroa replied, "It is well. The cause is just. It is death, and I have acted as if I had forgotten Opurukete". Then he handed his patu (club) to Whiti-patatō, and allowed him to kill him with it. This patu had been acquired at Opurukete during the Ngāti Tama–Ngāti Tūwharetoa War. It was Paroparo-houmea, the same club that had been used to murder Rua-wehea and spark the cycle of revenge that culminated in Tūwharetoa a Turiroa's death. Tūwharetoa's head was taken away and placed in a stream, to function as a mauri tuna (a talisman for attracting eels).

== Family ==
Tūwharetoa a Turiroa married Hine-te-ao, who was killed during the attack of Te Ata-inutai. They had a daughter, Tawhanga-rangi, and a son, Werewere.

Later he married Rauhato and had another son, Te Urunga.

== Bibliography ==
- Te Hata, Hoeta; Fletcher, H. J. (1916). "Ngati-Tuhare-toa occupation of Taupo-nui-a-tia". Journal of the Polynesian Society. 25: 104–116, 150–162.
- Te Hata, Hoeta; Fletcher, H. J. (1917). "Ngati-Tuhare-toa occupation of Taupo-nui-a-tia". Journal of the Polynesian Society. 26: 19–30, 69–99, 180–187.
- Grace, John Te Herekiekie (1959). Tuwharetoa: The History of the Maori People of the Taupo District. Wellington; Auckland; Sydney: A. H. & A. W. Reed.
- Jones, Pei Te Hurinui; Biggs, Bruce (2004). Ngā iwi o Tainui : nga koorero tuku iho a nga tuupuna = The traditional history of the Tainui people. Auckland [N.Z.]: Auckland University Press. ISBN 1869403312.
