= Tangoio =

Farming locality in New Zealand

- Settlement
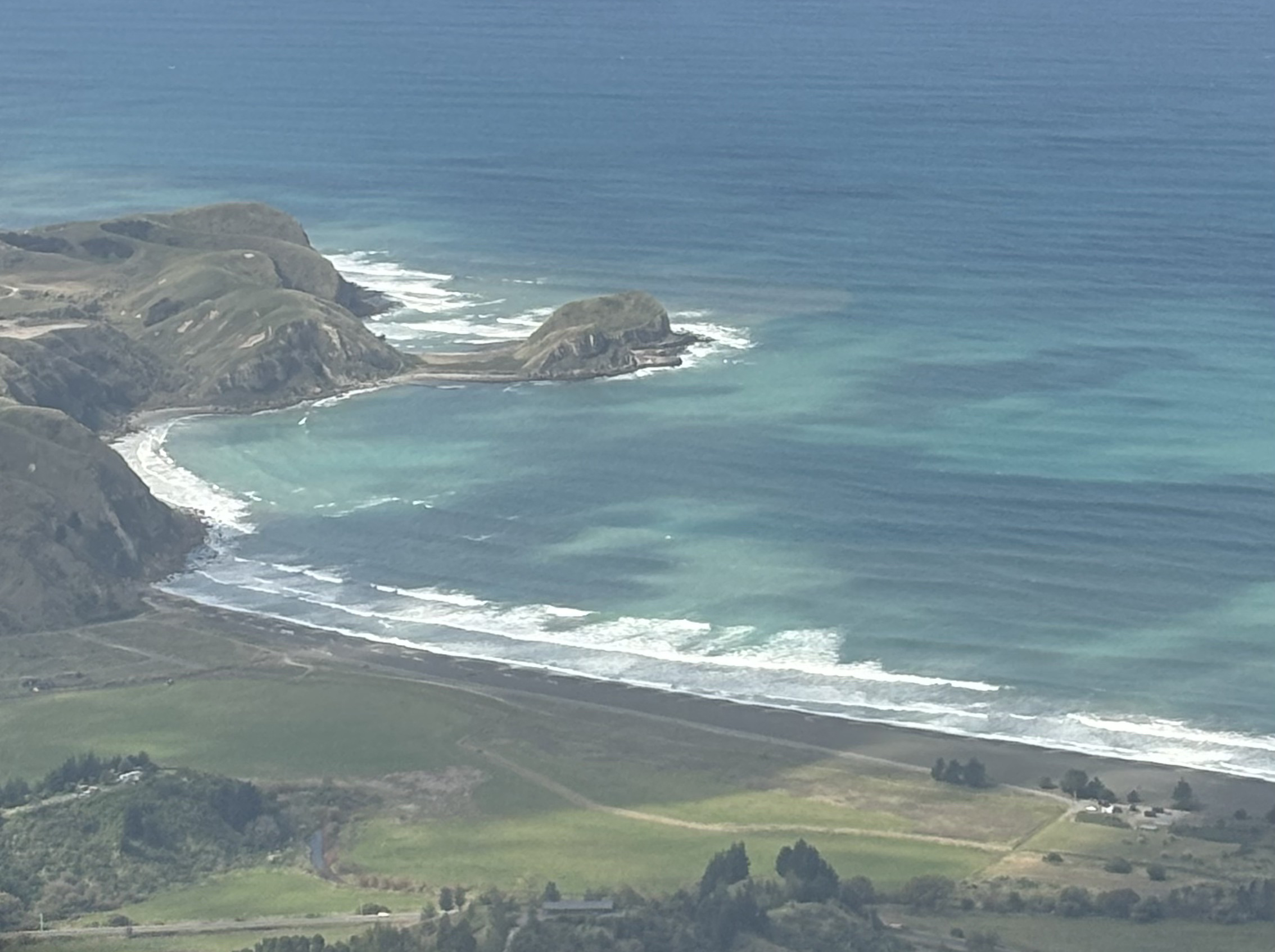
- Aerial view of Tangoio Beach and nearby headland, Whakaari
- Interactive map of Tangoio
- Coordinates: 39.33°S 176.91°E
- Country: New Zealand
- Region: Hawke's Bay Region
- Territorial authority: Hastings District
- Ward: Mohaka General Ward; Takitimu Māori Ward
- Community: Hastings District Rural Community
- Subdivision: Tūtira subdivision
- Electorates: Napier; Ikaroa-Rāwhiti (Māori)

Government
  - Territorial Authority: Hastings District Council
  - Mayor of Hastings: Wendy Schollum
  - Napier MP: Katie Nimon
  - Ikaroa-Rāwhiti MP: Cushla Tangaere-Manuel

Area
  - Total: 49.19 km^{2} (18.99 sq mi)

Population (2023 Census)
  - Total: 159
  - Density: 3.23/km^{2} (8.37/sq mi)
- Postcode(s): 4181

Tangoio is a farming locality and beach 23 kilometres north of Napier, 7 kilometres north of Whirinaki and 7 kilometres south-west of Waipatiki Beach in the Hawke's Bay Region of New Zealand's North Island. The locality is on the flat along Te Ngarue Stream and State Highway 2. It is part of Hastings District. Tangoio has been the official name since it replaced Tongoio in 1930. Near Tangoio Beach is Whakaari Headland, the site of a whaling station in the 1840s and a Māori canoe landing reserve.

== Demographics ==
Tangoio and its surrounds, which include Waipātiki Beach cover 49.19 km^{2} (18.99 sq mi). It is part of the Puketitiri-Tutira statistical area.

Historical population
| Year | Pop. | ±% p.a. |
|---|---|---|
| 2006 | 93 | — |
| 2013 | 102 | +1.33% |
| 2018 | 156 | +8.87% |
| 2023 | 159 | +0.38% |

Tangoio had a population of 159 in the 2023 New Zealand census, an increase of 3 people (1.9%) since the 2018 census, and an increase of 57 people (55.9%) since the 2013 census. There were 84 males, 75 females, and 3 people of other genders in 51 dwellings. 1.9% of people identified as LGBTIQ+. The median age was 47.0 years (compared with 38.1 years nationally). There were 33 people (20.8%) aged under 15 years, 24 (15.1%) aged 15 to 29, 81 (50.9%) aged 30 to 64, and 27 (17.0%) aged 65 or older.

People could identify as more than one ethnicity. The results were 71.7% European (Pākehā), 39.6% Māori, and 1.9% Pasifika. English was spoken by 100.0%, Māori by 11.3%, Samoan by 1.9%, and other languages by 5.7%. No language could be spoken by 1.9% (e.g. too young to talk). The percentage of people born overseas was 9.4, compared with 28.8% nationally.

Religious affiliations were 18.9% Christian, and 22.6% Māori religious beliefs. People who answered that they had no religion were 58.5%, and 1.9% of people did not answer the census question.

Of those at least 15 years old, 18 (14.3%) people had a bachelor's or higher degree, 78 (61.9%) had a post-high school certificate or diploma, and 27 (21.4%) people exclusively held high school qualifications. The median income was $34,000, compared with $41,500 nationally. 18 people (14.3%) earned over $100,000 compared to 12.1% nationally. The employment status of those at least 15 was 63 (50.0%) full-time, 15 (11.9%) part-time, and 6 (4.8%) unemployed.

== Marae ==
Tangoio Marae is a meeting place for Maungaharuru Tangitū, a collective of Māori hapū (subtribes) of the Ngāti Kahungunu iwi, consisting of Marangatūhetaua (also known as Ngāti Tū), Ngāi Tauira, Ngāi Te Ruruku ki Tangoio, Ngāi Tahu, Ngāti Kurumōkihi (formerly known as Ngāi Tatara) and Ngāti Whakaari. Pūnanga Te Wao is the name of the meeting house. In October 2020, the Government committed $6,020,910 from the Provincial Growth Fund to upgrade it and 18 other Hawke's Bay marae, creating 39 jobs.

== Climate ==
Climate data for Tangoio (1951–1980)
| Month | Jan | Feb | Mar | Apr | May | Jun | Jul | Aug | Sep | Oct | Nov | Dec | Year |
|---|---|---|---|---|---|---|---|---|---|---|---|---|---|
| Mean daily maximum °C (°F) | 22.0 (71.6) | 22.1 (71.8) | 20.5 (68.9) | 18.0 (64.4) | 15.1 (59.2) | 12.6 (54.7) | 11.6 (52.9) | 12.5 (54.5) | 14.5 (58.1) | 16.7 (62.1) | 18.9 (66.0) | 20.2 (68.4) | 17.1 (62.7) |
| Daily mean °C (°F) | 17.6 (63.7) | 17.8 (64.0) | 16.5 (61.7) | 14.2 (57.6) | 11.6 (52.9) | 9.3 (48.7) | 8.4 (47.1) | 9.2 (48.6) | 10.7 (51.3) | 12.6 (54.7) | 14.5 (58.1) | 16.0 (60.8) | 13.2 (55.8) |
| Mean daily minimum °C (°F) | 13.1 (55.6) | 13.5 (56.3) | 12.4 (54.3) | 10.3 (50.5) | 8.1 (46.6) | 6.0 (42.8) | 5.2 (41.4) | 5.9 (42.6) | 6.9 (44.4) | 8.5 (47.3) | 10.0 (50.0) | 11.7 (53.1) | 9.3 (48.7) |
| Average rainfall mm (inches) | 97 (3.8) | 119 (4.7) | 146 (5.7) | 132 (5.2) | 115 (4.5) | 175 (6.9) | 135 (5.3) | 158 (6.2) | 112 (4.4) | 106 (4.2) | 74 (2.9) | 138 (5.4) | 1,507 (59.2) |
Source: NIWA
