= Te Pōhue =

- Interactive map of Te Pōhue
- Coordinates: 39°15′S 176°41′E
- Country: New Zealand
- Region: Hawke's Bay
- Territorial authority: Hastings District
- Ward: Mohaka General Ward; Takitimu Māori Ward
- Community: Hastings District Rural Community
- Subdivision: Tūtira subdivision
- Electorates: Napier; Ikaroa-Rāwhiti (Māori)

Government
  - Territorial Authority: Hastings District Council
  - Mayor of Hastings: Wendy Schollum
  - Napier MP: Katie Nimon
  - Ikaroa-Rāwhiti MP: Cushla Tangaere-Manuel

Area
  - Total: 446.46 km^{2} (172.38 sq mi)

Population (2023 Census)
  - Total: 486
  - Density: 1.09/km^{2} (2.82/sq mi)

Te Pōhue is a small settlement in inland Hawke's Bay, in New Zealand's eastern North Island. It lies on State Highway 5, 31 kilometres inland from Whirinaki.

The remote settlement was once on a Māori track cutting across the tribal boundaries of Ngāti Kahungunu and Ngāti Tūwharetoa, two tribes who had made peace after a conflict. The modern settlement began as a hotel for travellers in the 1870s, when the original Napier to Taupo coach road was being cut through what was then a dense forest.

Two wind farms were approved for the area in 2006, despite some opposition from local residents. An application for the expansion of one on Te Waka Range was declined in 2007 and again in 2009. Harapaki Wind Farm opened in 2024.

== Demographics ==
Te Pōhue and its surrounds cover 446.46 km^{2} (172.38 sq mi). It is part of the Puketitiri-Tutira statistical area.

Historical population
Year	Pop.	±% p.a.
2006	339	—
2013	363	+0.98%
2018	408	+2.36%
2023	486	+3.56%
The 2006 population is for a smaller area of 405.79 km^{2}. Source:

Te Pōhue had a population of 486 in the 2023 New Zealand census, an increase of 78 people (19.1%) since the 2018 census, and an increase of 123 people (33.9%) since the 2013 census. There were 264 males and 225 females in 177 dwellings. 1.2% of people identified as LGBTIQ+. There were 114 people (23.5%) aged under 15 years, 84 (17.3%) aged 15 to 29, 231 (47.5%) aged 30 to 64, and 57 (11.7%) aged 65 or older.

People could identify as more than one ethnicity. The results were 80.9% European (Pākehā); 21.0% Māori; 5.6% Pasifika; 4.3% Asian; 0.6% Middle Eastern, Latin American and African New Zealanders (MELAA); and 8.6% other, which includes people giving their ethnicity as "New Zealander". English was spoken by 97.5%, Māori by 2.5%, Samoan by 0.6%, and other languages by 5.6%. No language could be spoken by 1.9% (e.g. too young to talk). New Zealand Sign Language was known by 0.6%. The percentage of people born overseas was 14.8, compared with 28.8% nationally.

Religious affiliations were 38.9% Christian, 0.6% Māori religious beliefs, 1.2% New Age, 0.6% Jewish, and 0.6% other religions. People who answered that they had no religion were 53.7%, and 6.2% of people did not answer the census question.

Of those at least 15 years old, 66 (17.7%) people had a bachelor's or higher degree, 201 (54.0%) had a post-high school certificate or diploma, and 108 (29.0%) people exclusively held high school qualifications. 30 people (8.1%) earned over $100,000 compared to 12.1% nationally. The employment status of those at least 15 was 210 (56.5%) full-time, 51 (13.7%) part-time, and 3 (0.8%) unemployed.

== Education ==
Te Pohue School is co-educational state primary school catering for years 1 to 8, with a roll of 26 as of July 2026. It opened in 1897 and moved to its current location in the early 20th century.

== Climate ==
Climate data for Esk Forest, elevation 427 m (1,401 ft), (1981–2010)
Month	Jan	Feb	Mar	Apr	May	Jun	Jul	Aug	Sep	Oct	Nov	Dec	Year
Mean daily maximum °C (°F)	22.2 (72.0)	21.7 (71.1)	19.9 (67.8)	16.8 (62.2)	14.2 (57.6)	11.8 (53.2)	10.9 (51.6)	11.7 (53.1)	13.9 (57.0)	16.3 (61.3)	18.4 (65.1)	20.4 (68.7)	16.5 (61.7)
Daily mean °C (°F)	17.2 (63.0)	17.0 (62.6)	15.4 (59.7)	12.6 (54.7)	10.4 (50.7)	8.1 (46.6)	7.3 (45.1)	7.9 (46.2)	9.8 (49.6)	11.8 (53.2)	13.6 (56.5)	15.7 (60.3)	12.2 (54.0)
Mean daily minimum °C (°F)	12.2 (54.0)	12.3 (54.1)	10.9 (51.6)	8.5 (47.3)	6.6 (43.9)	4.4 (39.9)	3.8 (38.8)	4.0 (39.2)	5.7 (42.3)	7.2 (45.0)	8.9 (48.0)	11.1 (52.0)	8.0 (46.3)
Average rainfall mm (inches)	102.4 (4.03)	134.0 (5.28)	217.6 (8.57)	164.7 (6.48)	144.1 (5.67)	168.1 (6.62)	150.7 (5.93)	160.3 (6.31)	181.8 (7.16)	123.3 (4.85)	83.6 (3.29)	162.3 (6.39)	1,792.9 (70.58)
Source: NIWA (rain 1971–2000)
