= Wharewaka =

Suburb of Taupō, New Zealand

- Suburb
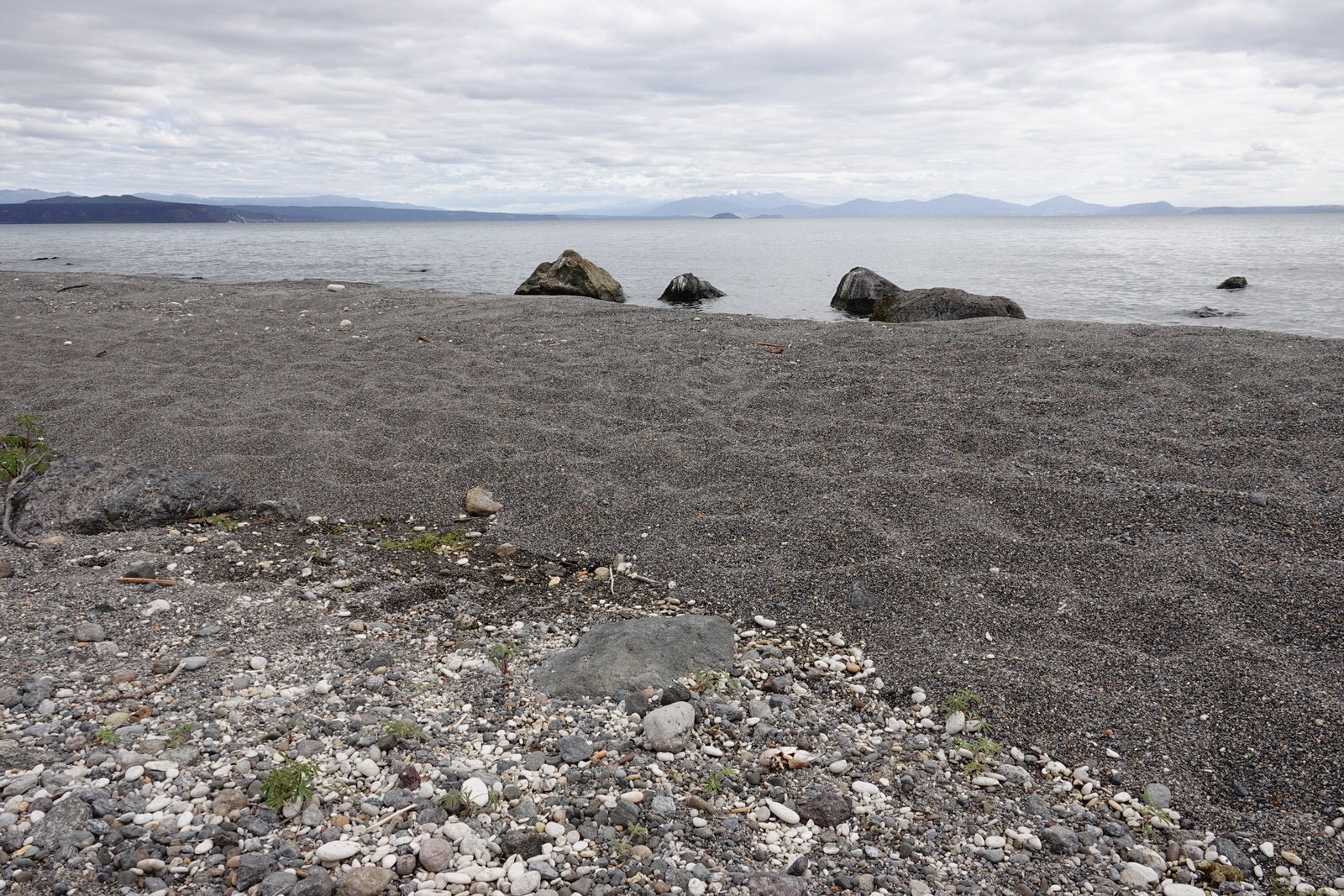
- Northern Koura crayfish on the beach at Wharewaka
- Interactive map of Wharewaka
- Coordinates: 38°43′54″S 176°04′15″E
- Country: New Zealand
- City: Taupō
- Local authority: Taupō District Council
- Electoral ward: Taupō General Ward

Area
  - Land: 570 ha (1,400 acres)

Population (June 2025)
  - Total: 2,250
  - Density: 390/km^{2} (1,000/sq mi)

		Richmond Heights
(Lake Taupō)	Wharewaka	Maunganamu
	Waitahanui

Wharewaka is a suburb of Taupō, New Zealand. It stretches from Rainbow Point to Five Mile Bay on the west side of State Highway 1. Wharewaka lies on a small point of land next to Lake Taupō and 1.6 km northwest of the Taupō Airport.

Wharewaka has a large proportion of holiday homes. Recent developments such as the Wharewaka Point Development and the Lakeside development have seen a rise in population.

Wharewaka Point is a busy swimming beach during the summer. It is popular with tourists and locals alike.

Wharewaka is also the location of the Summerset retirement village.

After an M5.7 earthquake on 30 November 2022, 170 metres of the shoreline at Wharewaka Point collapsed into the lake.

== Demographics ==
Wharewaka covers 5.70 km^{2} (2.20 sq mi) and had an estimated population of 2,250 as of June 2025, with a population density of 395 people per km^{2}.

Historical population
Year	Pop.	±% p.a.
2006	477	—
2013	714	+5.93%
2018	939	+5.63%
2023	1,614	+11.44%

Wharewaka had a population of 1,614 in the 2023 New Zealand census, an increase of 675 people (71.9%) since the 2018 census, and an increase of 900 people (126.1%) since the 2013 census. There were 774 males and 840 females in 663 dwellings. 2.0% of people identified as LGBTIQ+. The median age was 52.2 years (compared with 38.1 years nationally). There were 258 people (16.0%) aged under 15 years, 153 (9.5%) aged 15 to 29, 651 (40.3%) aged 30 to 64, and 549 (34.0%) aged 65 or older.

People could identify as more than one ethnicity. The results were 87.4% European (Pākehā); 10.6% Māori; 2.2% Pasifika; 8.0% Asian; 0.6% Middle Eastern, Latin American and African New Zealanders (MELAA); and 3.0% other, which includes people giving their ethnicity as "New Zealander". English was spoken by 97.6%, Māori by 2.8%, and other languages by 8.4%. No language could be spoken by 1.9% (e.g. too young to talk). New Zealand Sign Language was known by 0.4%. The percentage of people born overseas was 21.2, compared with 28.8% nationally.

Religious affiliations were 34.9% Christian, 2.2% Hindu, 0.2% Islam, 0.4% Māori religious beliefs, 0.2% Buddhist, 0.4% New Age, and 1.7% other religions. People who answered that they had no religion were 51.1%, and 8.9% of people did not answer the census question.

Of those at least 15 years old, 318 (23.5%) people had a bachelor's or higher degree, 744 (54.9%) had a post-high school certificate or diploma, and 288 (21.2%) people exclusively held high school qualifications. The median income was $40,600, compared with $41,500 nationally. 210 people (15.5%) earned over $100,000 compared to 12.1% nationally. The employment status of those at least 15 was 573 (42.3%) full-time, 174 (12.8%) part-time, and 18 (1.3%) unemployed.
