= 2-4-4-2 =

Articulated locomotive wheel arrangement

In Whyte notation, 2-4-4-2 refers to a railroad steam locomotive that has two leading wheels followed by two sets of four coupled driving wheels and two trailing wheels.

UIC classification: 1BB1 (also known as German classification and Italian classification)

- French classification: 120+021
- Turkish classification: 23+23
- Swiss classification: 2/3+2/3

For a Mallet locomotive the UIC classification is refined to (1'B)B1'

== Equivalent classifications ==
Other equivalent classifications are:

- UIC classification: 1BB1 (also known as German classification and Italian classification)
- French classification: 120+021
- Turkish classification: 23+23
- Swiss classification: 2/3+2/3

For a Mallet locomotive the UIC classification is refined to (1'B)B1'

A similar wheel arrangement has been used for Garratt locomotives, but it is referred to as 2-4-0+0-4-2 since both engine units can pivot.

== US examples ==
This articulated wheel arrangement was rare in North America; example was the Mallet locomotive. Most were built as logging locomotives, presumably to better negotiate the uneven (and often temporary) trackwork that characterized such operations. The added mechanical complexity was found to be of limited value, as reflected in their modest production and use.

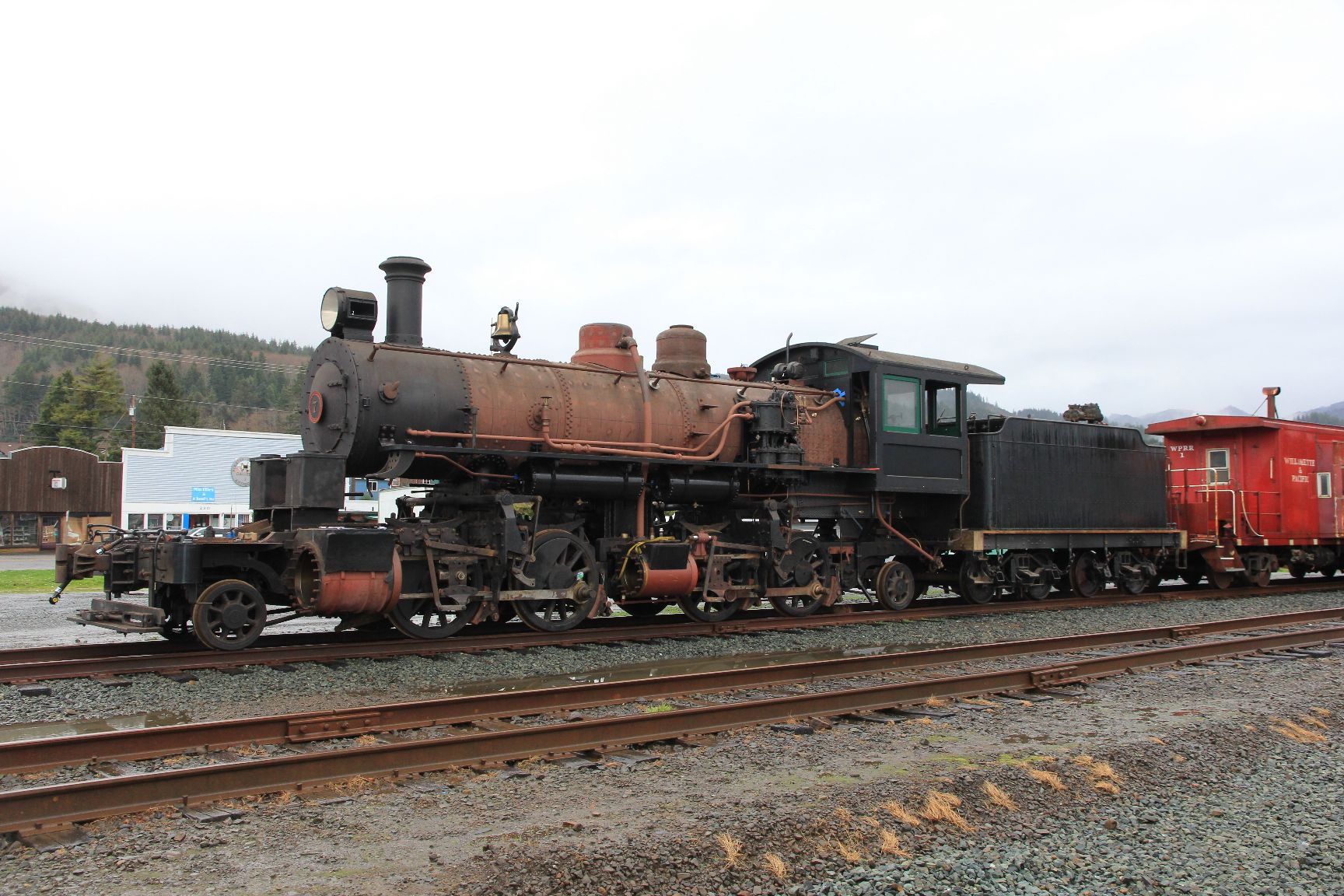
Columbia River Belt Line No. 7 "Skookum" during restoration outside the Garibaldi shops, January 2018.

There is one known surviving example: Columbia River Belt Line No. 7 "Skookum" (former Little River No. 126), built by Baldwin Locomotive Works in June 1909. It was retired and abandoned in place in the forest following a derailment in 1955. As of January 2023, it has been restored to operating condition following a 15 year rebuild at the Oregon Coast Scenic Railroad shop in Garibaldi, Oregon. The engine currently resides at the Niles Canyon Railway in Sunol California.

== New Zealand ==
One 2-4-4-2 steam locomotive was acquired from ALCO by the Taupo Totara Timber company (TTTCo) for use on the Putāruru–Mōkai logging tramway. Built in 1912, it arrived in New Zealand in 1914, and was numbered 7. It served the TTTCo until some time in the 1950s. It is currently owned by the Glenbrook vintage railway, and it is in storage awaiting restoration.

=== TTTCo Number 7 ===
Built by ALCO (shop # 53970), this locomotive is a Mallet Compound type, built for the Taupo Totara Timber Company for use on their 51 miles (82 km) TTT Railway between Putāruru and Mokai in the North Island. It hauled timber trains over the TTT Railway northern section, while Heisler types worked the mountainous southern section. However, Number 7 was regularly serviced at the company's Mokai engineering workshop. To reach Mokai, this locomotive successfully negotiated the southern section with curves as tight as 99 feet (30 m) radius.

ALCO #53970 is now preserved on the Glenbrook Vintage Railway, near Auckland, New Zealand, and is designated GVR Number 4. The locomotive is currently out of service awaiting overhaul, but can still be seen at the railway's Pukeoware workshops.
