= Pare-kāwa =

Māori rangatira (chieftain)

Pare-kāwa was a Māori rangatira (chieftain) of Ngāti Tūwharetoa from the region around Lake Taupō, New Zealand. She is the ancestor of the Ngāti Parekāwa hapū. She probably lived in the mid-seventeenth century.

== Life ==
Pare-kāwa was the first-born child of Te Rangi-ita and Waitapu. Through her father, Te Rangi-ita, she was a descendant of Tūwharetoa i te Aupōuri. Her mother was the daughter of Te Ata-inutai of Ngāti Raukawa, through whom she was a descendant of Hoturoa, captain of the Tainui canoe. Her parents had been married as part of a peace agreement which ended an attack by Te Ata-inutai on Ngāti Tūwharetoa. She had three younger sisters, Uru-kaihina, Piunga-tai, and Tore-iti and four younger brothers, Tama-mutu, Manu-nui, Meremere, and Tū-te-tawhā. They all grew up at Marae-kōwhai, north of Lake Taupō, near Mōkai.

As the eldest child, Pare-kāwa had significant mana and, as a result, Tama-mutu gave her the land west of Lake Taupō, as far as the Ongarue River, including Hauhungaroa, Tuhua, Pureora, Whare-puhanga, Hurakia, and Tuaro-paki.

=== Gift to Tū-te-tawhā ===
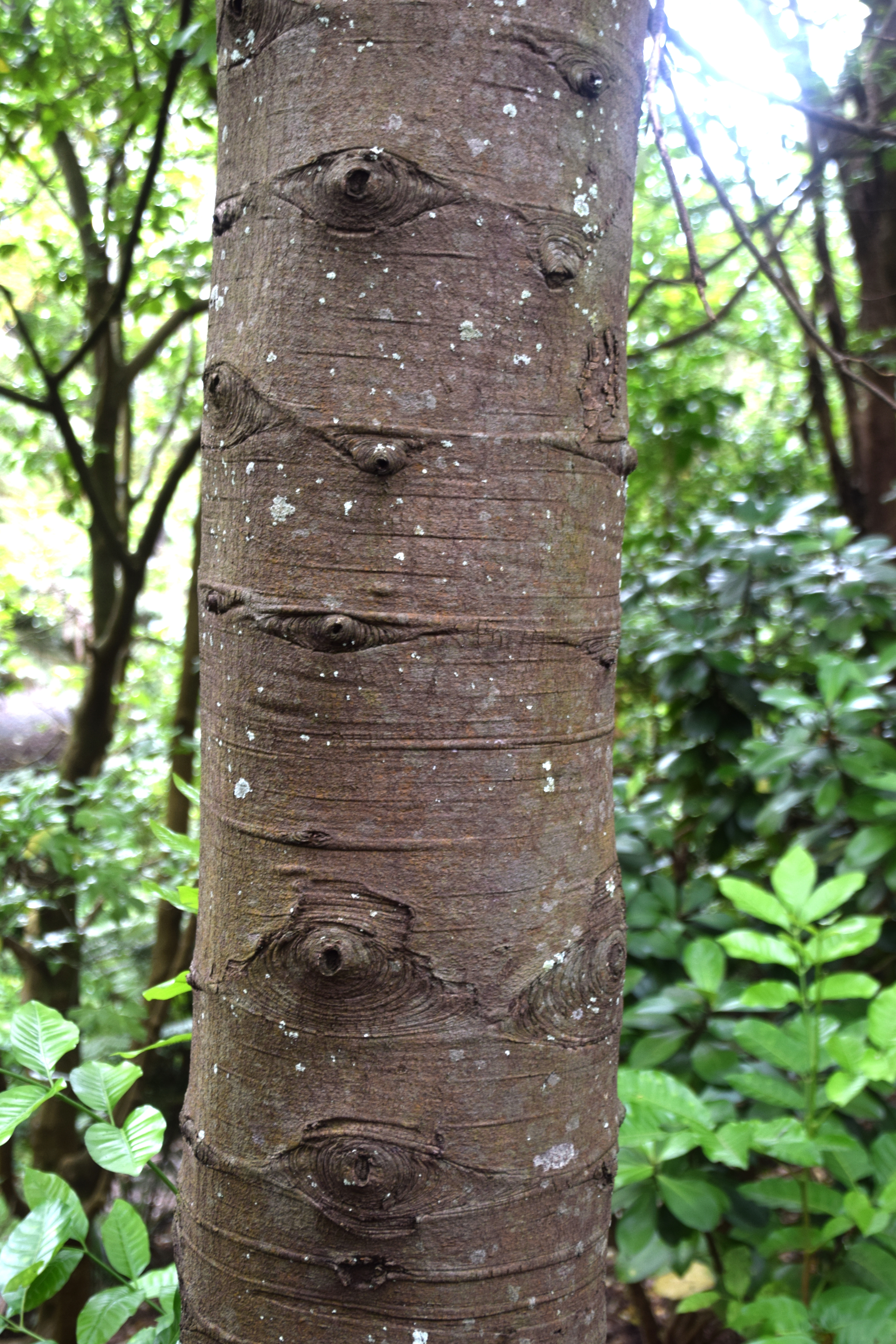
Trunk of a tanekaha tree.

Because her younger brother, Tū-te-tawhā, had avenged their maternal grandfather Te Ata-inutai, Pare-kāwa decided to do him honour with a sumptuous gift. She instructed her people to hunt birds, pluck them, roast them, and preserve them in packages made of Tanekaha bark, called papa or pātua. When they brought the birds to her, she told them that they were to be a gift for Tū-te-tawhā and the people were so excited that they decided to wrap all of the pātua inside another, giant pātua, which they named Waiariki (Aotearoa's first big thing). Waiariki was seven times the size of the largest pātua and it would not fit in a single canoe, so they had to place it on a platform between two canoes.

Because he had received such an impressive gift from Pare-kāwa, while his older brothers had received nothing, Tū-te-tawhā became "vain and boastful" and began undertaking raids down the Waikato River, culminating in his death.

== Ngāti Parekāwa ==
The Ngāti Parekāwa hapū of Ngāti Tūwharetoa is descended from Parekawa. It currently makes use of two marae:

- Mōkai Marae, with the wharenui Pakake Taiari, which is shared with several other hapu of Ngāti Tūwharetoa, Ngāti Raukawa, and Pouākani.
- Poukura Marae, with the wharenui Parekaawa, located northeast of Kuratau.

== Bibliography ==
- Grace, John Te Herekiekie (1959). Tuwharetoa: The history of the Maori people of the Taupo District. Auckland: A.H. & A.W. Reed.
- Te Hata, Hoeta; Fletcher, H. J. (1917). "Ngati-Tuhare-toa occupation of Taupo-nui-a-tia". Journal of the Polynesian Society. 26: 19–30, 66–69, 91–99, 180–187.
- Jones, Pei Te Hurinui; Biggs, Bruce (2004). Ngā iwi o Tainui : nga koorero tuku iho a nga tuupuna = The traditional history of the Tainui people. Auckland [N.Z.]: Auckland University Press. ISBN 1869403312.
