= Taupo Totara Timber Company =

New Zealand timber and building supplies company

Taupo Totara Timber Co Ltd
- Trade name: TTT
- Industry: Wood products, building supplies
- Founded: 19 May 1900; 126 years ago
- Founder: E. Tudor Atkinson (1858?–1928)
- Defunct: 1972
- Fate: Company acquired by New Zealand Forest Products
- Successor: Carter Holt Harvey
- Headquarters: Putāruru, New Zealand
- Area served: New Zealand, Japan

The Taupo Totara Timber Company (TTT) was a New Zealand timber, timber products, and building supplies company that operated between 1900 and 1972. The company was founded in 1900 by a group of business people led by Tudor Atkinson, and began trading in 1905. Until 1946, the TTT also operated one of New Zealand's longest privately-owned railway lines, providing passenger, freight, and mail services between Putāruru and Taupō, in the central North Island. The TTT was taken over by N.Z. Forest Products Limited in 1972.

== History ==
The TTT was formed in 1900 in Wellington, New Zealand, by a group of business people led by Tudor Atkinson. Its objective was to harvest and market timber from forests near the village of Mokai, 14 miles (23 km) northwest of Taupō, in the North Island of New Zealand.

=== 1900 – 1905: Construction ===
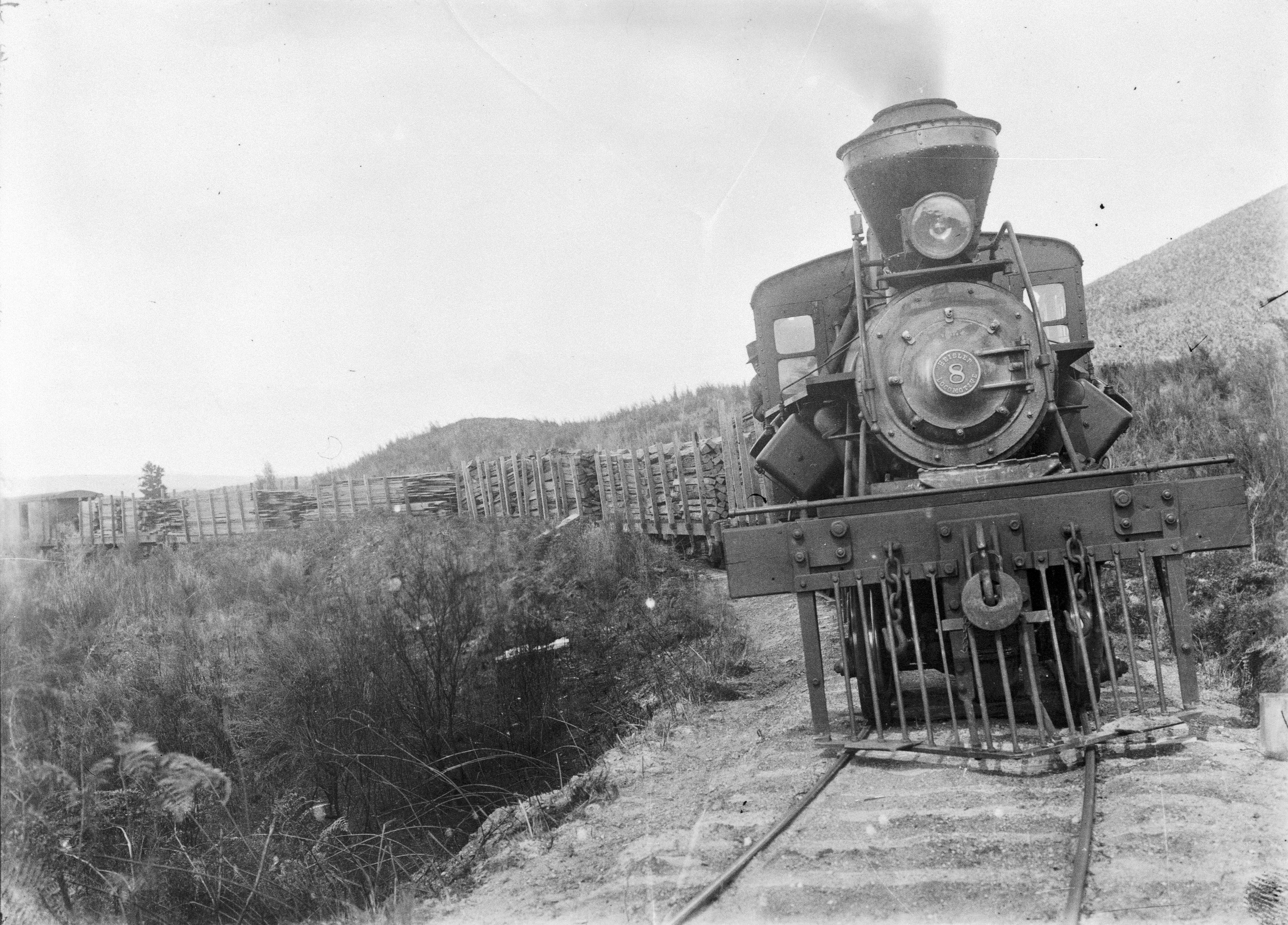
TTT locomotive number 8 with a timber train.

In 1900, transportation in the Mokai area was limited to pack-horses, or where roads had been built, horse-drawn vehicles. Bullock teams provided heavy freight services. The TTT's directors decided to build a railway line between the sawmill and the nearest existing rail-head: The NZ Government Railway at Putāruru.

TTT director and former Wellington and Manawatu Railway engineer James Fulton designed a 51 miles (82 km) contour railway linking Mokai with Putāruru. Contractor John McLean & Sons started construction in 1903, and the TTT formally took possession of the completed railway on 4 November 1905.

During the railway construction project, the TTT operated small temporary sawmills at Kopakorahi and Mokai. These mills supplied timber for the railway, and supported the construction of the production sawmill and workers' accommodation at Mokai.

=== 1905 – 1949: Timber Milling & Sales ===
Following the completion of the TTT railway in November 1905, the company began marketing timber through its Wellington and Onehunga (Auckland) timber-yards.

Difficult trading conditions in the first two years prompted a major re-organisation. Tudor Atkinson resigned as Director and General Manager in September 1907. His replacement as General Manager, Herman B. Coupe, abandoned the Wellington market, moved the company's head office to Putāruru, and opened a TTT timber yard at Newmarket. The TTT's 230-strong workforce was scaled back and 70 people lost their jobs. The Mokai sawmill (which had been operating two shifts per day) was reduced to working a single shift per day. Timber production fell from about 15,000,000 board feet (35,000 m^{3}) per year, to 7,865,000 board feet (18,560 m^{3}) in the year ended March 1909. According to the TTT's company history, profitability was achieved "in a short time".

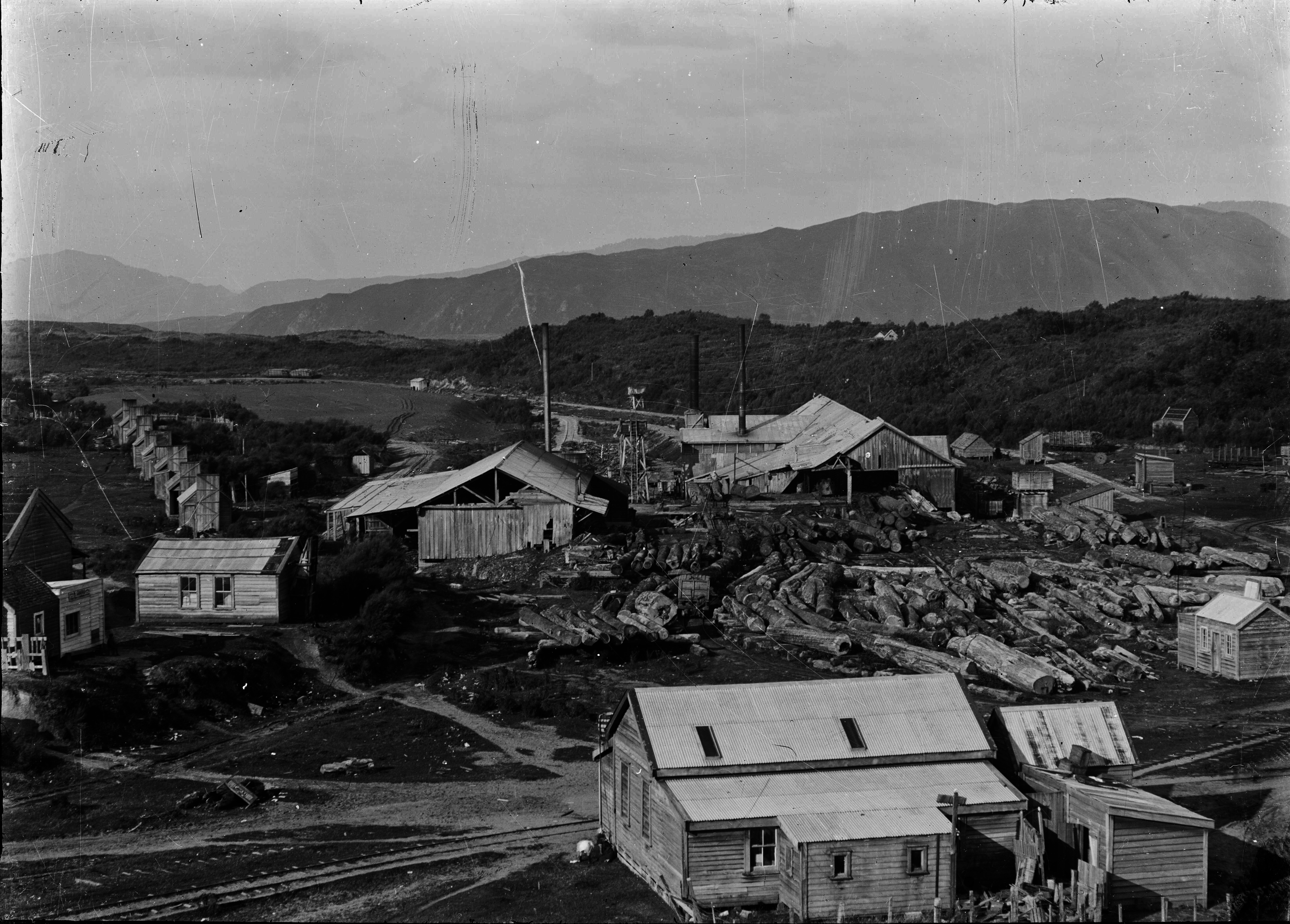
View overlooking the Mokai timber mill owned by the Taupo Totara Timber Company. Photographed by Albert Percy Godber in February 1923. (Godber Collection, Alexander Turnbull Library)

The TTT remained focused on the Auckland market throughout the 1920s and 1930s, with 1920 a "high point" in the company's history.

In 1934 the TTT purchased a controlling interest in the Tauri Tutukau forest, comprising 4,170 acres (1,690 ha) of freehold land, from the estate of its previous owner, Dr. Rayner. Tauri Tutukau consisted mainly of rimu, with about 15% totara and 15% matai.

In late 1944 the TTT switched from rail to road transport of sawn timber. The southern section of the TTT railway ceased operations on 26 October 1944 and was removed. The northern 19 miles (31 km) of the TTT Railway between Putāruru and the "Nineteen-Mile Peg" was sold to the New Zealand Government Railways.

The TTT relocated its main production sawmill (the "Number 1 Mill") during the mid-1940s from Mokai to a 183 acres (74 ha) site at Maroa, near State Highway 1. Purchased from the New Zealand Government Railways, the site included 25 cottages. The TTT built an additional 25 cottages to support the new saw-milling operation. The Maroa sawmill was operational by April 1948, and processed logs harvested from the Tauri Tutukau block.

From the late 1940s, the TTT added non-native timber to its product range, securing supplies of exotic timbers such as radiata pine from other saw-millers. At Putāruru the company installed a tanalith timber treatment plant.

Until the 1940s, the TTT's main outlet for timber was the TTT yard at Newmarket in Auckland. After 1945, sales from its Putāruru yard grew rapidly. By 1951 the company reported that about half of its mill output was being sold from Putāruru, the rest going to Newmarket.

=== 1950 – 1972: Expansion and Diversification ===
During the 1950s the TTT began to expand and diversify. At Putāruru the company built new showrooms and stores for sales of builder's and plumbers' hardware. The original TTT staff houses behind the Putāruru sawmill were replaced, a new office block was built, and a sash and door plant established. The 45 acres (18 ha) Putāruru site was subdivided and some surplus land sold.

In the late 1950s the TTT purchased from Pacific Forests Limited a sawmill in Tokoroa processing radiata pine, together with cutting rights over Pacific's exotic forests for 30 years.

Also during the late 1950s the TTT established branches in Matamata, Cambridge, and Tokoroa. The company relocated timber processing from Newmarket to Putāruru and redeveloped the Newmarket site as a timber yard and hardware outlet with a new 15,000 square foot (1,400 m^{2}) building.

The Maroa sawmill ceased production in 1962. Its replacement was a new bandsaw mill at Putāruru which started cutting in late February 1963, and was formally opened in May that year. The new mill processed native and exotic logs trucked by road from forest areas including the Tauri Tutukau. The TTT Putāruru complex was further expanded with the completion of a bulk hardware store, facilities for direct loading of timber onto railway wagons, and a new staff cafeteria. Single men's huts were relocated from Maroa to a vacant area behind the main office, and renovated inside. The company opened a paint and wallpaper shop, the TTT Colour House, on Princes Street, Putaruru.

In 1964 the company began planting radiata pine on cut over parts of the Tauri Tutukau block and the Mokai forest areas, and shortly afterwards, also began restocking the Pacific forests block.

In 1963 the company began to acquire land for residential subdivisions in Auckland, Hamilton, Rotorua and Matamata, and the TTT was selling sections by 1966.

The Putāruru plant in 1964 began manufacturing bench tops using Laminex and Formica. The following year the TTT installed a finger jointing plant, the first of its kind in New Zealand.

Rotorua company G.A. Harker Limited and its subsidiaries were taken over in 1965. Harker's retail operation was re-organised as the Taupo Totara Timber Company (Rotorua) Limited, and became the TTT's Rotorua branch. G.A. Harker Hardware Limited was re-organised as a forest and land-owning subsidiary.

Cambridge timber and hardware company Speight, Pearce, Nicoll, Davys Limited in 1966 became the Taupo Totara Timber Company (SPND) Limited, a much expanded Cambridge branch.

The TTT acquired more than 80 percent of Pacific Forests Limited in early 1966. With a steady supply of logs from the thinning of Pacific's radiata pine forests, the TTT in 1967 started exporting logs to Japan.

At Tokoroa a new hardware and wallpaper shop supplemented the Tokoroa yard in 1966, The shop moved into new purpose built premises in 1968.

At Putāruru in 1967 the TTT opened a factory for gang-nail truss production.

Also 1967, the TTT acquired the hardware business of J. Jones Ltd. and relocated the business to the Newmarket branch.

K.D.V. Industries Limited became a TTT subsidiary in 1970, adding new outlets at Mornington in Auckland, and at Whangarei. K.D.V.'s rain wear, canvas, and aluminium foil manufacturing activities further diversified the TTT's operations.

In 1971 the TTT acquired Tauranga based Bunn Bros Limited, and Te Puke based Matakana Milling and Export Corp. Ltd., which operated a radiata pine sawmill on Matakana Island, and retail outlets in Tauranga and Te Puke. The same year, the company bought a 6,137 acres (2,484 ha) radiata pine forest from Australian company New Zealand Pinelands Pty, Ltd.

Also in 1971, the TTT moved its Newmarket branch to Wiri, in South Auckland.

By August 1971, the TTT owned mills at Matakana Island, Putāruru, Tauranga, Tokoroa, and Whangarei. TTT timber and hardware retailing branches were located in Auckland, Cambridge, Matamata, Putāruru, Rotorua, Tauranga, Te Puke, Tokoroa, and Whangarei.

TTT subsidiary South Pacific Homes in 1971 exported a shipment of pre-cut homes to Noumea.

=== 1972 – 1987: Acquisition by NZFP ===
N.Z. Forest Products Limited (NZFP) in April 1972 offered to buy all shares in the TTT. The TTT board recommended shareholders accept the offer, and later in 1972 the company became part of NZ Forest Products.

The TTT brand remained in use until a re-organisation of NZFP in April 1987.

== Corporate structure ==
Tudor Atkinson and his colleagues registered two companies:

- The Wellington Industrial Development Company (Limited) (WID), registered 19 May 1900
- The Taupo Totara Timber Company (Limited) (TTT), registered 26 February 1901

The original TTT and WID were governed by a combined board of directors, with three directors from each company. All six directors attended TTT & WID board meetings. The two companies had identical shareholders.

In 1915 a new company, the Taupo Totara Timber Co Ltd, was registered. This new company took over the assets and liabilities of the original TTT and WID, which were wound up. (Note: Following the usual practice in early 20th century NZ newspapers and government papers, the abbreviation "TTT" in this article identifies the combined business, including the WID, unless the context demands otherwise.)

== See also ==
- Forestry in New Zealand
- TTT Railway

== Bibliography ==
- Clark, Jean Hamilton (1951). Taupo Totara Timber Company and its Share in the Development of the Timber Lands 1900–1950 (MA Thesis). Auckland, NZ: Auckland University College.
- Cudby, Kevin (2001). Men of Pluck. Lower Hutt, NZ: Cudby Publications. ISBN 0-473-07505-9.
- Davis, Ida; Forshaw, Ruth (1990). Mokai. Taupō, NZ: I. Davies, R. Forshaw.
- Jones, Stanley W. (1957). "The Taupo Totara Timber Co". New Zealand Engineering. 12/7: 237–239.
- Scherer, Vicki (1992). Putaruru: Home of the Owl. Tokoroa, NZ: South Waikato District Council.
- TTT (1907). The Taupo Totara Timber Company Limited Minutes 1901 – 1907. Wellington, NZ: The Taupo Totara Timber Company Limited. p. 202. (NZ Timber Museum Collection https://www.nztm.org.nz) This minute book records combined meetings of the TTT & WID.
- TTT; Sparrow Industrial Pictures Ltd (1951). Fifty Years of Progress – 1901–1951. Putāruru, NZ: Taupo Totara Timber Co Ltd.
- TTT (1961). 1901–1961 – Sixty years of progress in the Taupo Totara Timber Company Ltd. Putāruru, NZ: Taupo Totara Timber Co Ltd.
