= Taupo Totara Timber Railway =

Railway in New Zealand

Taupo Totara Timber Company Railway
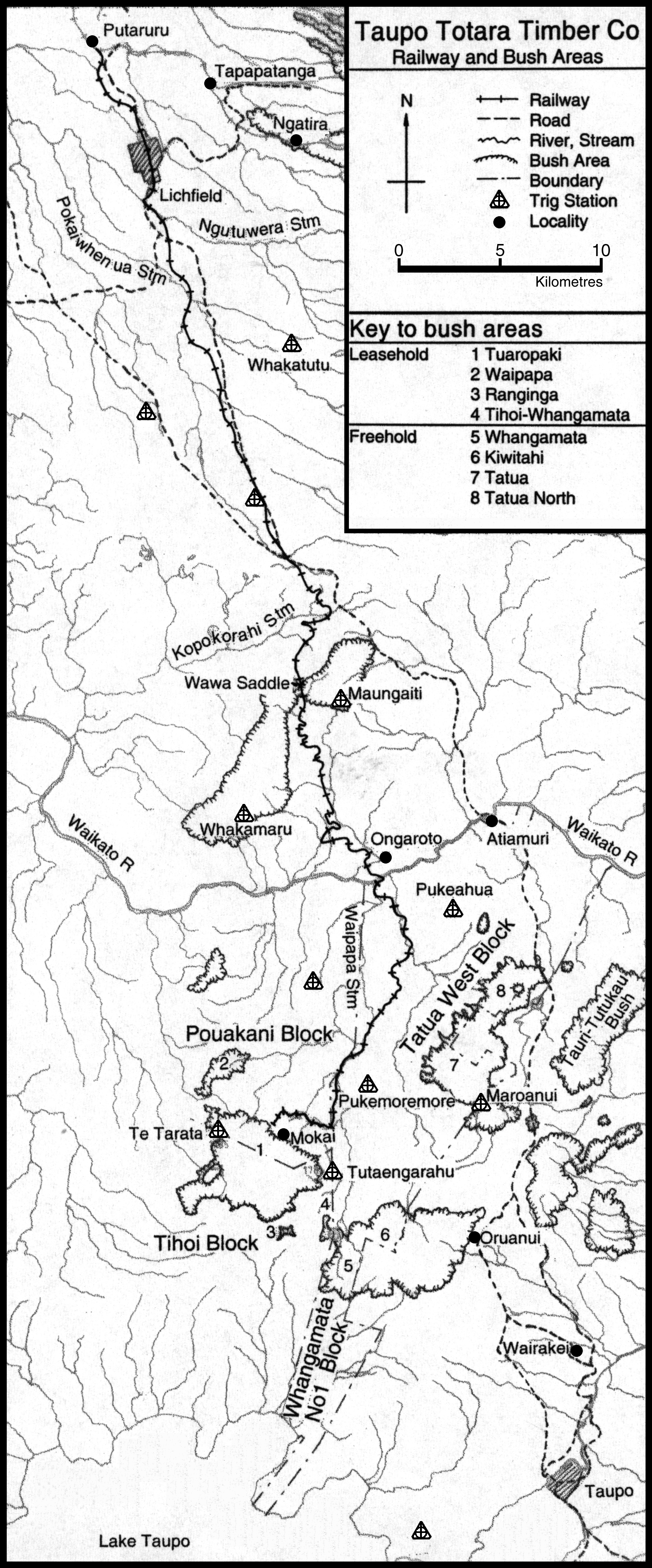
- Taupo Totara Timber Company Railway, 1903 - 1905.

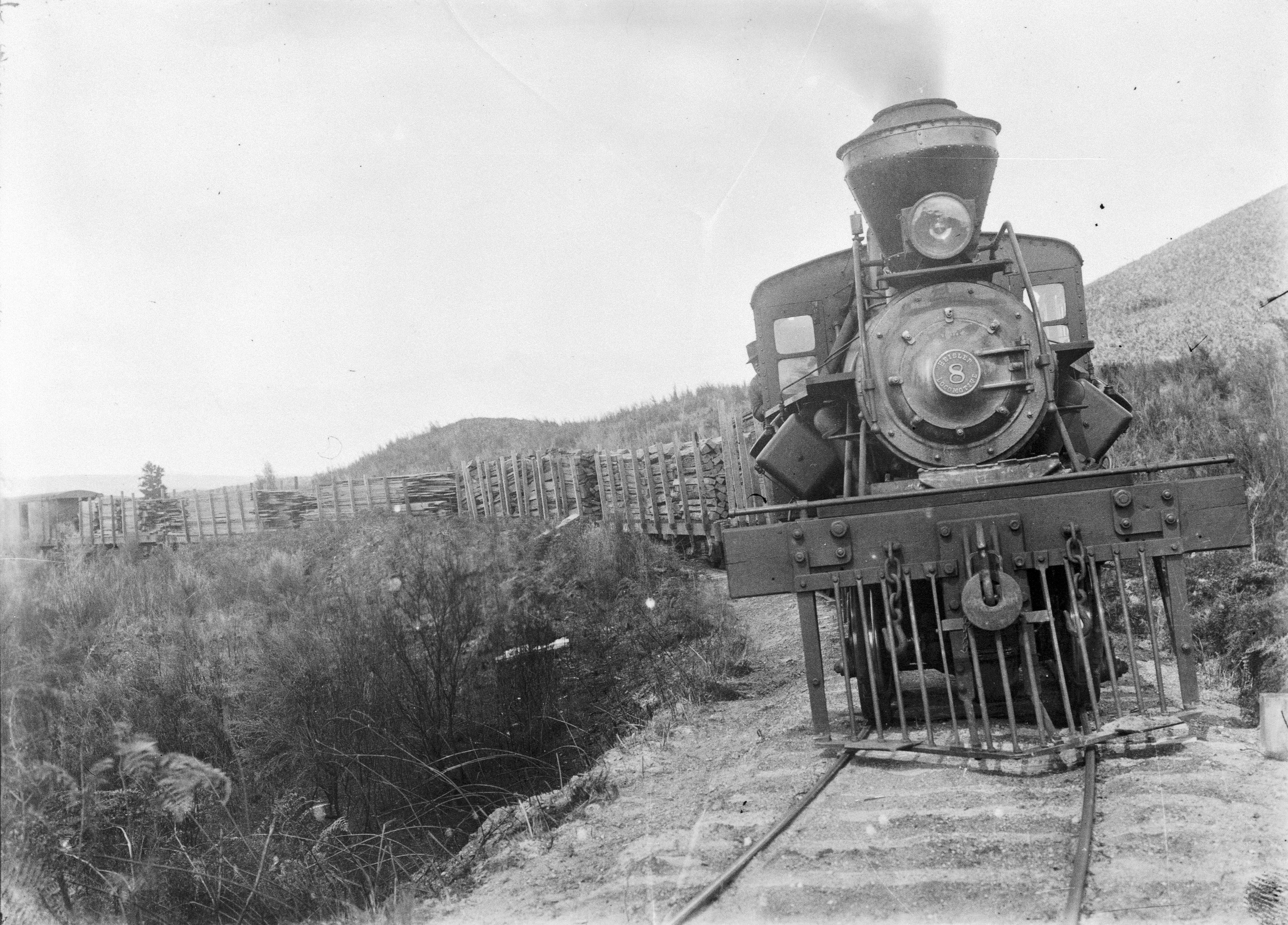
- TTT locomotive number 8 with a timber train.

Overview
- Dates of operation: 1903–1947
- Successor: Kinleith Branch (NZR)

Technical
- Track gauge: 3 ft 6 in (1067 mm)

The Taupo Totara Timber Company Railway ("TTT Railway") was constructed by the Taupo Totara Timber Company (TTT) to link their saw-milling centre at Mokai with the New Zealand Government Railways line (NZR) at Putāruru in the Waikato region on the North Island of New Zealand. The 51 miles (82 km) long railway operated from 1905 to 1947. After the TTT switched to road transport of sawn timber, the NZR purchased the 19 miles (31 km) stretch between Putāruru and the Kinleith Mill south of Tokoroa. The area between Putāruru and Kinleith is now^{(2024)} served by KiwiRail's Kinleith Branch.

== History ==
The 51 miles (82 km) line was built for the TTT between 1903 and 1905 by John McLean & Sons to carry sawn timber from the TTT sawmill at Mokai (14 miles (23 km) northwest of Taupō) to the government railway at Putāruru. It was designed as a contour railway by former Wellington and Manawatu Railway engineer and TTT director James Fulton, who in 1903 temporarily resigned his position on the TTT board to supervise construction of the railway and sawmills. The company took possession of the line during an official opening ceremony on the 4th of November 1905.

The 5 miles (8.0 km) northern section between Putāruru and Lichfield was built on the formation of the former Lichfield Branch line, which was originally built by the New Zealand Thames Valley Land Company (NZTVLC) to be part of the line to Rotorua. The permanent way (rails and sleepers) had been removed in 1897 after the failure of the NZTVLC's Lichfield town development (known as the "Selwyn Estate"), leaving only the earthworks.

The TTT line continued south of Lichfield over easy country through what is now Tokoroa to Kopakorahi, near the present-day^{(2024)} Tokoroa Golf Course and Kinleith paper mill. From Kopakorahi it crossed the Maungaiti Range via the Wawa saddle, descending 1,000 feet (300 m) from Wawa to Ōngāroto, where it crossed the Waikato River. The line continued south and uphill to the sawmill village at Mokai.

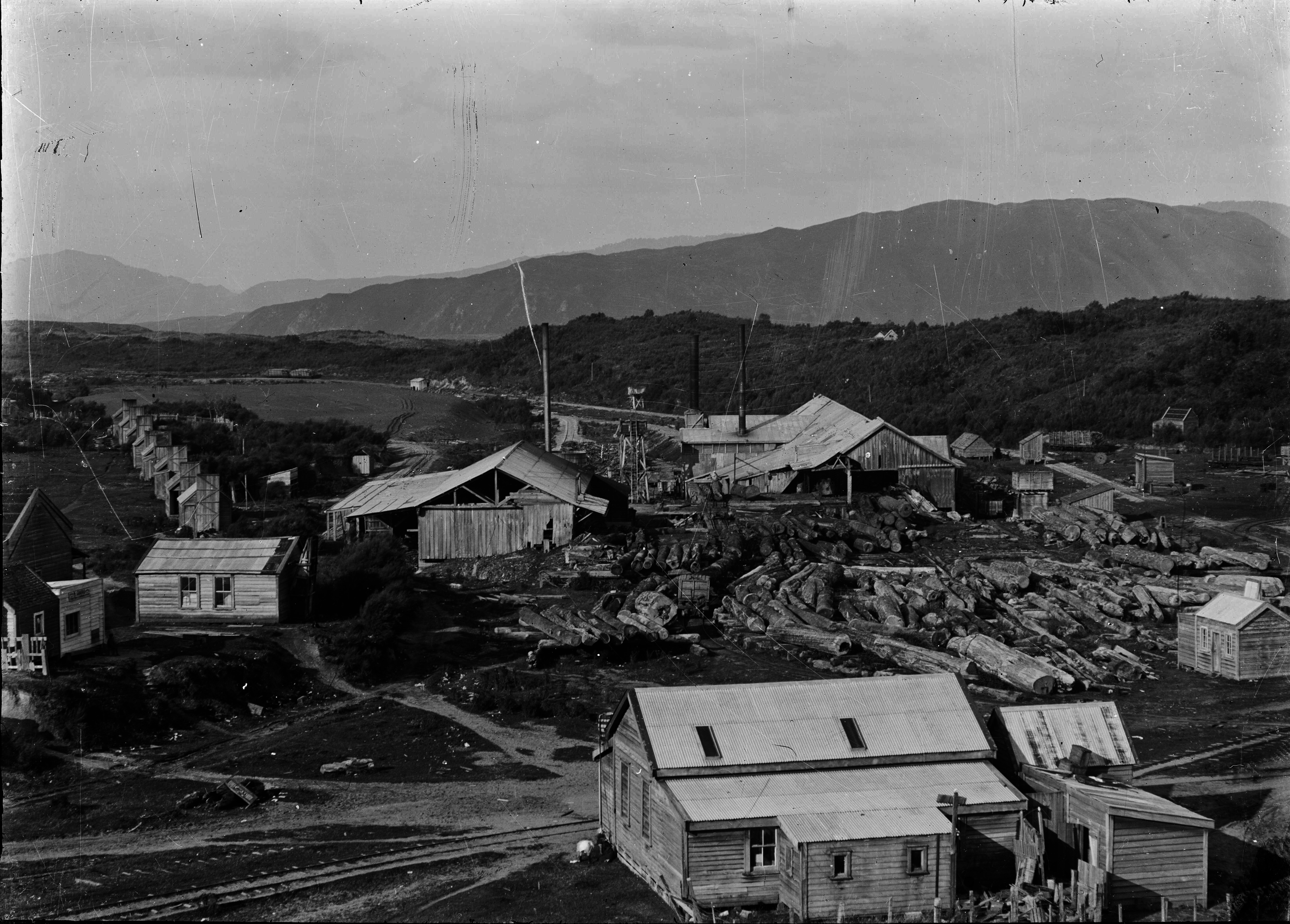
Taupo Totara Timber Company sawmill at Mokai (Godber Collection, Alexander Turnbull Library)

Several bush tramways, some temporary, brought logs from the forests to the Mokai sawmill.

The Putāruru to Mokai line had a ruling grade of 1 in 35. The construction contract specified 100 feet (30 m) radius curves on steep sections and curves of 3 chains (60 m) to 5 chains (100 m) on easier sections. Some of the sharper curves were later rebuilt with wider radii.

== Operations ==
Initially the TTT Railway operated as a private carrier, carrying TTT staff and their families, guests, freight, and mail between Putāruru and Mokai.

From January 29, 1908, the TTT Railway opened its freight and passenger services to the public under the terms of a NZ Government Order in Council. The line provided a direct connection between Putāruru and the settlements of Lichfield, Tokoroa, Ōngāroto, and Mokai. Passengers and freight for destinations such as Wairakei, Taupō, Tokaanu, and northern Hawkes Bay, would be set down or picked up at a siding approximately 3 miles (4.8 km) from Mokai. A Government road facilitated transportation between the siding, Oruanui, Wairakei, and Taupō.

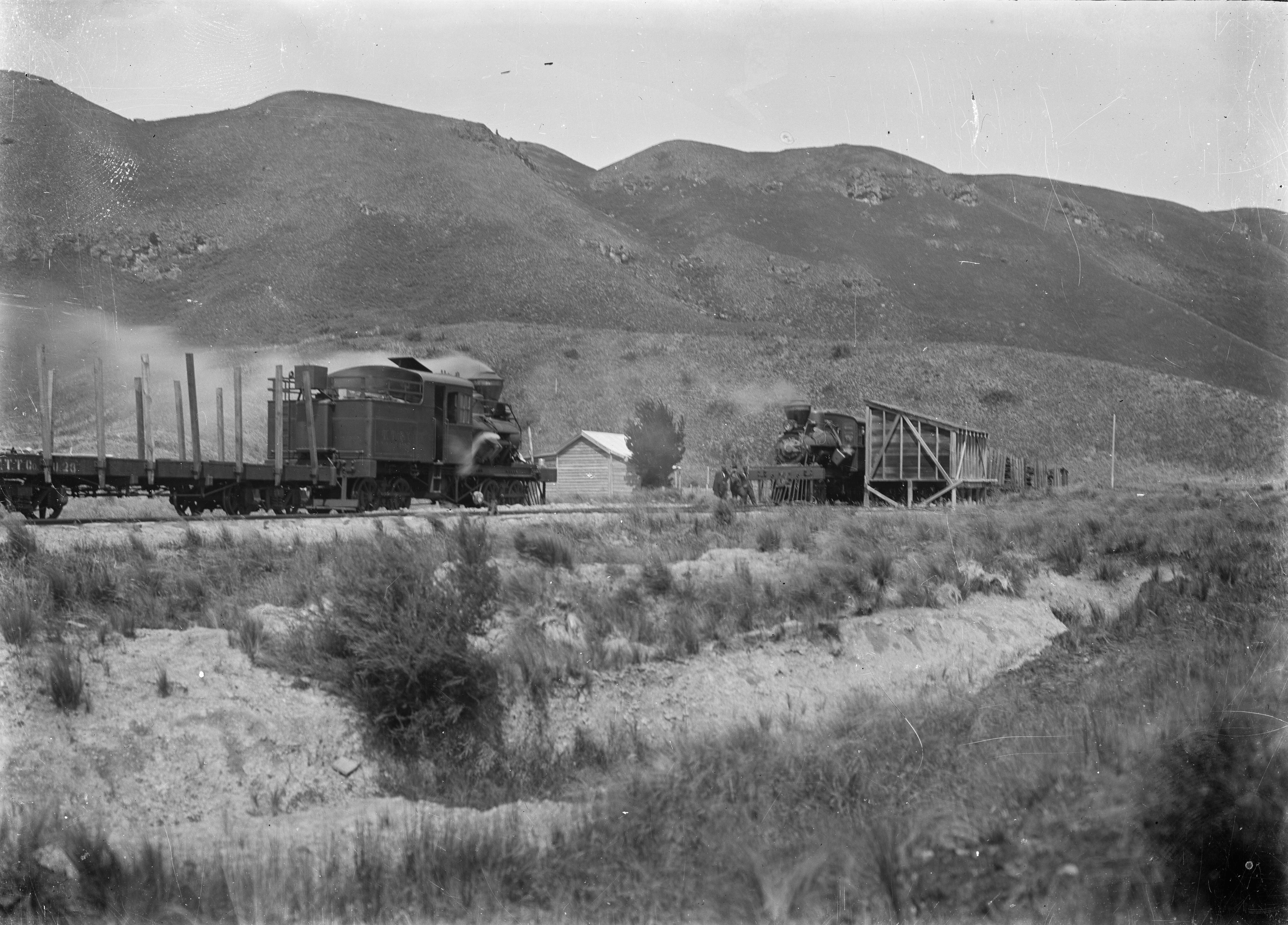
Trains hauled by Heisler steam locomotives crossing at Kopakorahi

A siding at Kopakorahi was used for changing locomotives. Heisler geared locomotives hauled trains over the mountainous section between Kopakorahi and Mokai. From 1914, trains on the easier northern section between Putāruru and Kopakorahi were usually hauled by locomotive number 7, an articulated Mallet Compound locomotive.

A typical TTT train consisted of one locomotive (or occasionally two), multiple flat cars, and a van with passenger accommodation. The TTT used hand-operated train-brakes, controlled by a brake operator who walked along the tops of the cars, manually adjusting the brakes on each vehicle.

== Waikato River bridges ==
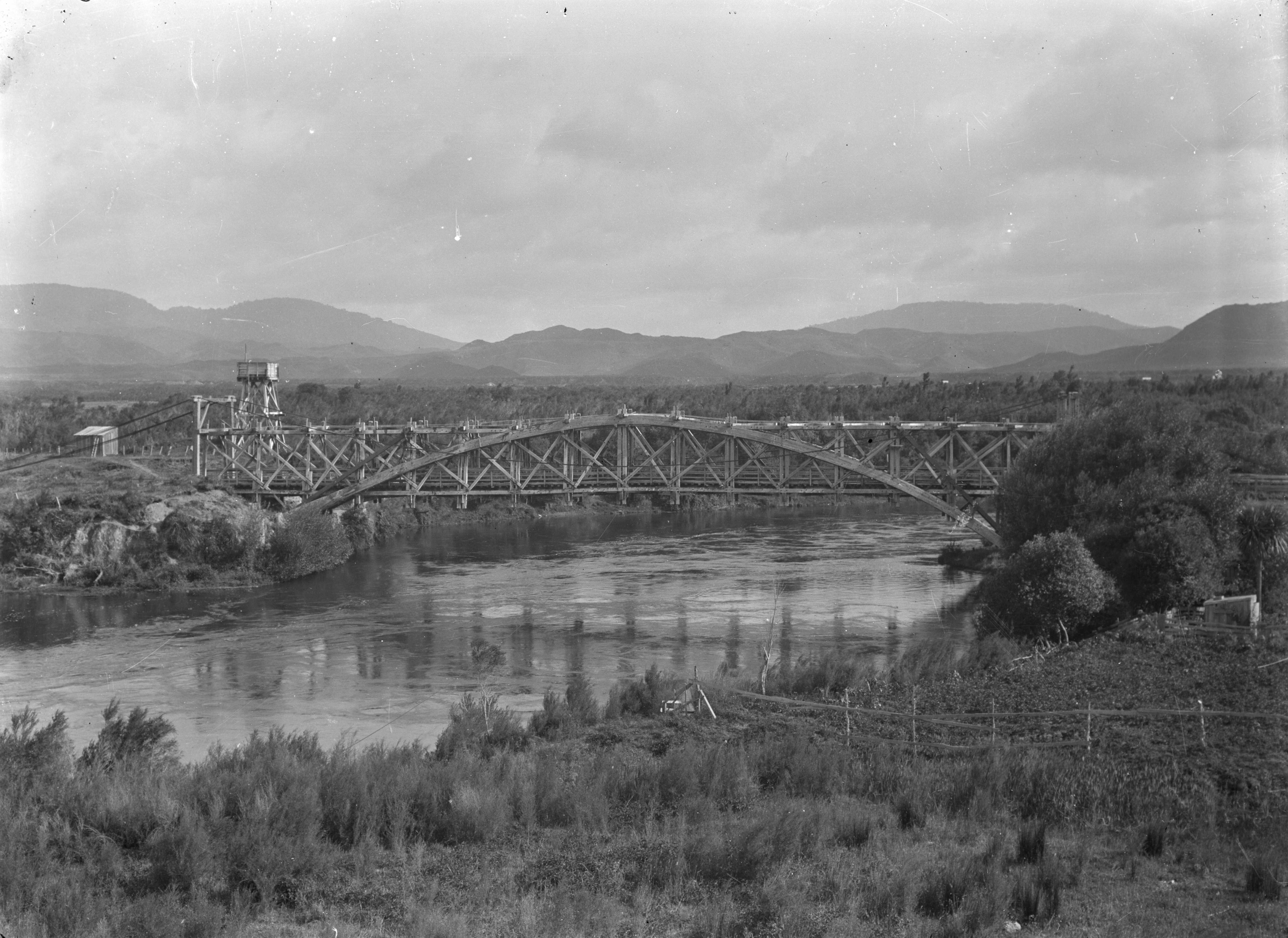
The longest single span wooden bridge in New Zealand over the Waikato River at Ōngāroto

The TTT Railway crossed the Waikato River at Ōngāroto, approximately 3.5 miles (5.6 km) southwest of the present-day^{(2024)} State Highway 1 bridge near Ātiamuri .

The first Ōngāroto rail bridge was built in 1904. Designed by James Fulton, this timber bridge had a single span of 231 feet (70 m) and a total length of 260 feet (79 m). The structure consisted of four bolted laminated timber arches (two each side), stiffened by a timber through-truss. Except for hardware such as bolts, the bridge was built entirely of locally sourced totara.

To provide support and access during construction, the contractors in late 1903 erected a temporary suspension bridge. Prior to construction of the arch bridge, the suspension bridge provided access for Mokai traffic. The suspension bridge cables are visible in early photos of the timber arch bridge.

In the late 1920s the timber arch bridge deteriorated and consulting engineer Stanley Jones recommended replacement. Following Jones's inspection and report, the company banned anyone from riding the train across the bridge. Trains would stop at the bridge and the passengers and fireman would walk across. The driver would gently open the throttle and then jump off. The train would slowly ease across the bridge. When it reached the other side, the fireman would stop the train, and everyone would reboard.

In 1931 a new steel truss bridge was built a short distance downstream of the timber arch bridge. Designed by Edgar Jones, of Jones and Adams consulting engineers, the bridge was erected by Wilcox and Company Ltd, at a cost of £10,000.

The steel bridge was designed with two spans, supported by a central pier. The contractors sank a coffer dam and started building foundations for the central pier. However, a hot water eruption flooded the coffer dam, causing it to float off. It was decided to relocate the mid-river pier. Some of the steelwork had already been fabricated, so one of the spans was redesigned as a cantilever supporting the end of the other girder. This bridge stood successfully until it was removed some years after the closure of the TTT railway.

The timber arch bridge was dismantled in 1933 and the timber sold.

The steel truss bridge's deck was expected to be submerged a "few feet" below the surface of Lake Whakamaru when the Whakamaru dam was flooded. The bridge was removed before the dam was flooded.

A concrete bridge was later erected at the site of the Ōngāroto rail bridges.

== Taupo extension proposal ==
In 1911 the TTT put forward a proposal to extend their line from Mokai to Taupō via Oruanui and Wairakei. Residents in the Taupo district formed the Taupo District Railway League to support the project. However, the proposal triggered controversy.

The NZ Government in 1913 issued an Order in Council authorising the extension, and in 1914 passed legislation describing the process to be followed. (Note: Before 1915, enabling legislation for the TTT Railway typically refers to the Wellington Industrial Development Company Limited (WID). The WID and the Taupo Totara Timber Company were owned by common shareholders and controlled by a common board of directors. In 1915, the two companies were consolidated into a single company, the Taupo Totara Timber Co Ltd.) The company was unable to implement the project and eventually abandoned the Taupo extension proposal.

== Closure and sale ==
In late 1944 the TTT adopted road transport throughout its operations.

The company disposed of its railway in two stages. The southern section from the "19-Mile Peg" to Mokai, together with branch lines from Mokai to various bush areas, was dismantled and salvageable items were sold. The salvage operation began on 26 October 1944 and was completed by 27 October 1945.

The TTT continued providing rail service on the 19 miles (31 km) northern section, from Putāruru to the "19-Mile Peg" (south of Tokoroa). The NZ Government compensated the company for its operating loss on this service, until the line could be taken over. The NZ Government purchased the northern section in October 1946.

Starting on Tuesday, 10 June 1947, the Public Works Department took over the operation of the northern section, using steam locomotives purchased from the TTT.

The northern section of the former TTT Railway ceased operations in 1949. As part of a Government scheme for the development of the Waikato River basin and surrounding areas, a line between Putāruru and Kinleith, built to NZR standards, was completed on 6 October 1952. This line is still^{(2024)} in use as part of the NZR's Kinleith Branch.

== Rolling stock ==
=== Locomotives ===
At various times through its history, the TTT operated at least eleven locomotives.

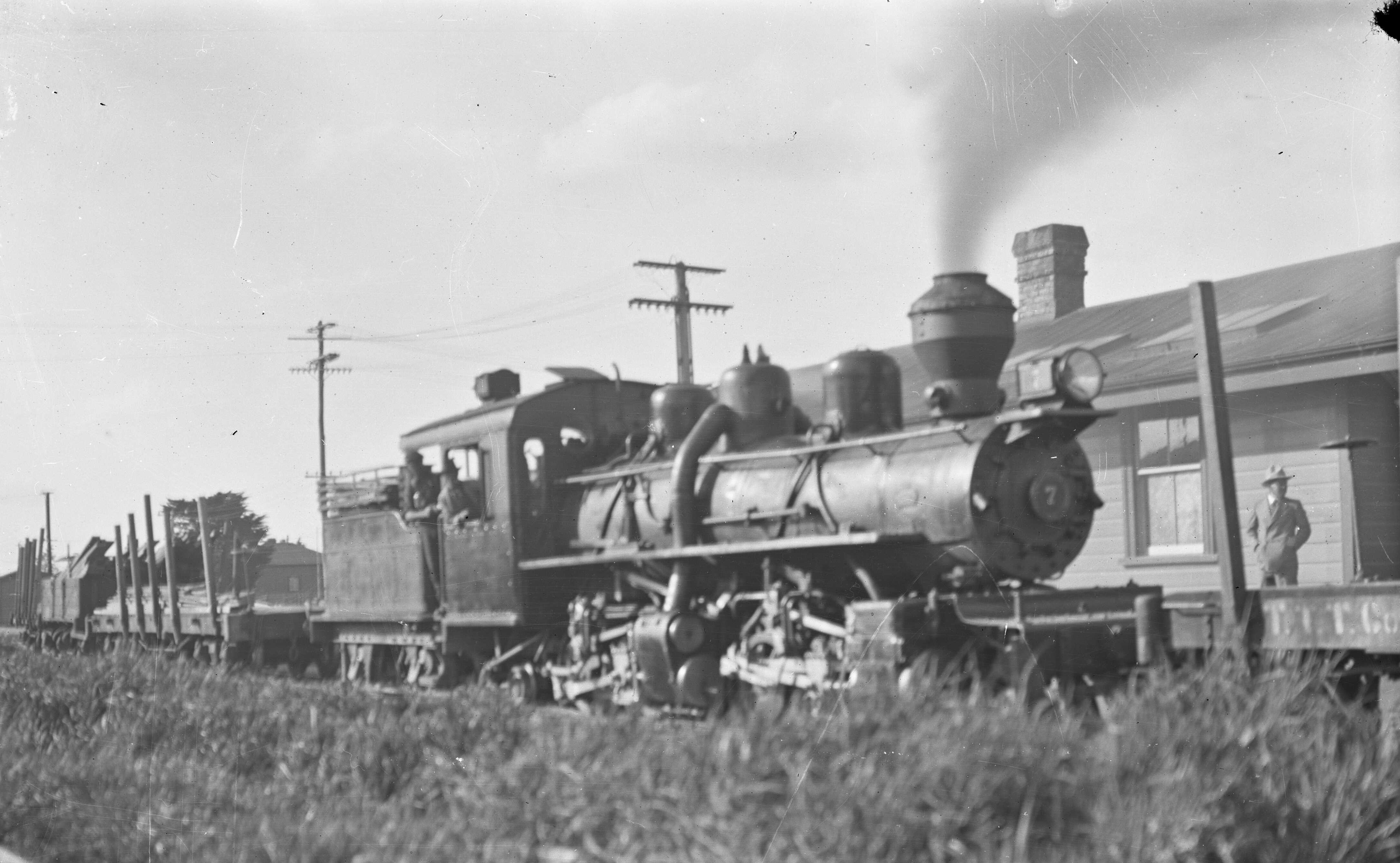
TTT Number 7 ALCO Mallet steam locomotive

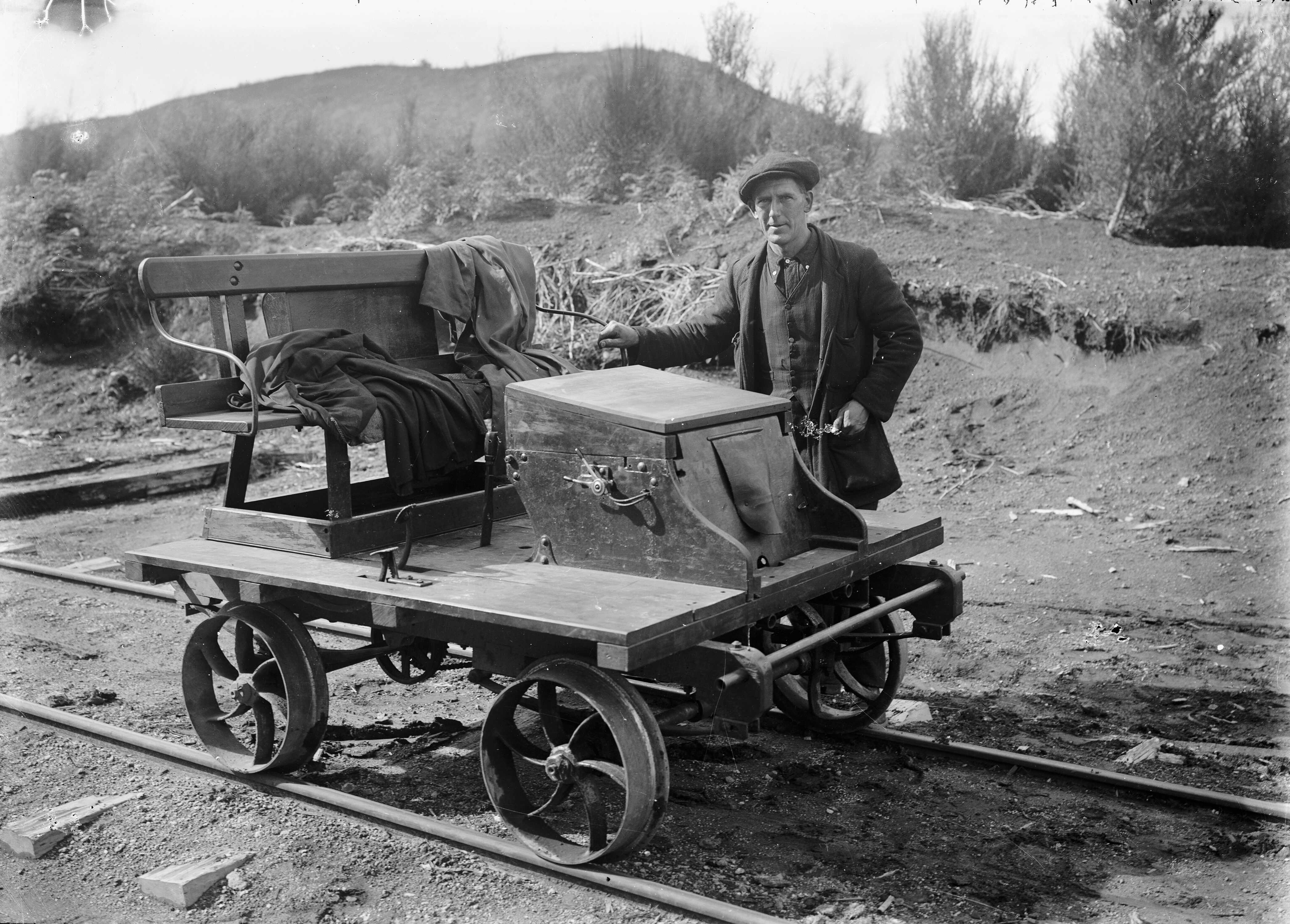
H Taylor with TTT maintenance trolley

TTT Number	Maker	Maker's Number	Year	Type	Comments
1	Stearns Manufacturing Company	1074	1903	Heisler	New. Scrapped early 1950s
2	Stearns Manufacturing Company	1082	1903	Heisler	New. Sold c. 1944
3	Yorkshire Engine Company	255	1875	Conventional	From NZR ("A" class), 1905. Sold c. 1921
4	Dübs & Company	654	1873	Conventional	From Nelson Harbour Board 1907 (ex NZR "A" class). Sold 1914
5	Climax Locomotive Works	Unknown	Unknown	Climax Type A	Purchased used from Lidgerwood Manufacturing Company, 1903. Sold 1914.
6	Barclay	1270	1912	Conventional	New. Sold 1923
7	ALCO	53970	1912	Mallet Compound	New. Sold 1947. Preserved at the Glenbrook Vintage Railway as their No.4
8	Heisler Locomotive Works	1448	1921	Heisler	New. Sold c. 1944.
9	Heisler Locomotive Works	1449	1921	Heisler	New. Sold 1947.
10	A&G Price	?	1937	Price Type E (geared)	New. Sold 1947.
–	Avonside Engine Company	1218	1878	Single Fairlie	Rented from NZR (NZR R class No. 29). Operated by TTT from 12 Apr 1943 until 19 November 1943.

=== Wagons ===
- 2 combination car for passengers and freight
- 1 freight van
- 20 ACF flat cars purchased in 1904
- 10 ACF flat cars purchased in 1907
- 10 flat cars (on order, 1921)

=== Gallery ===
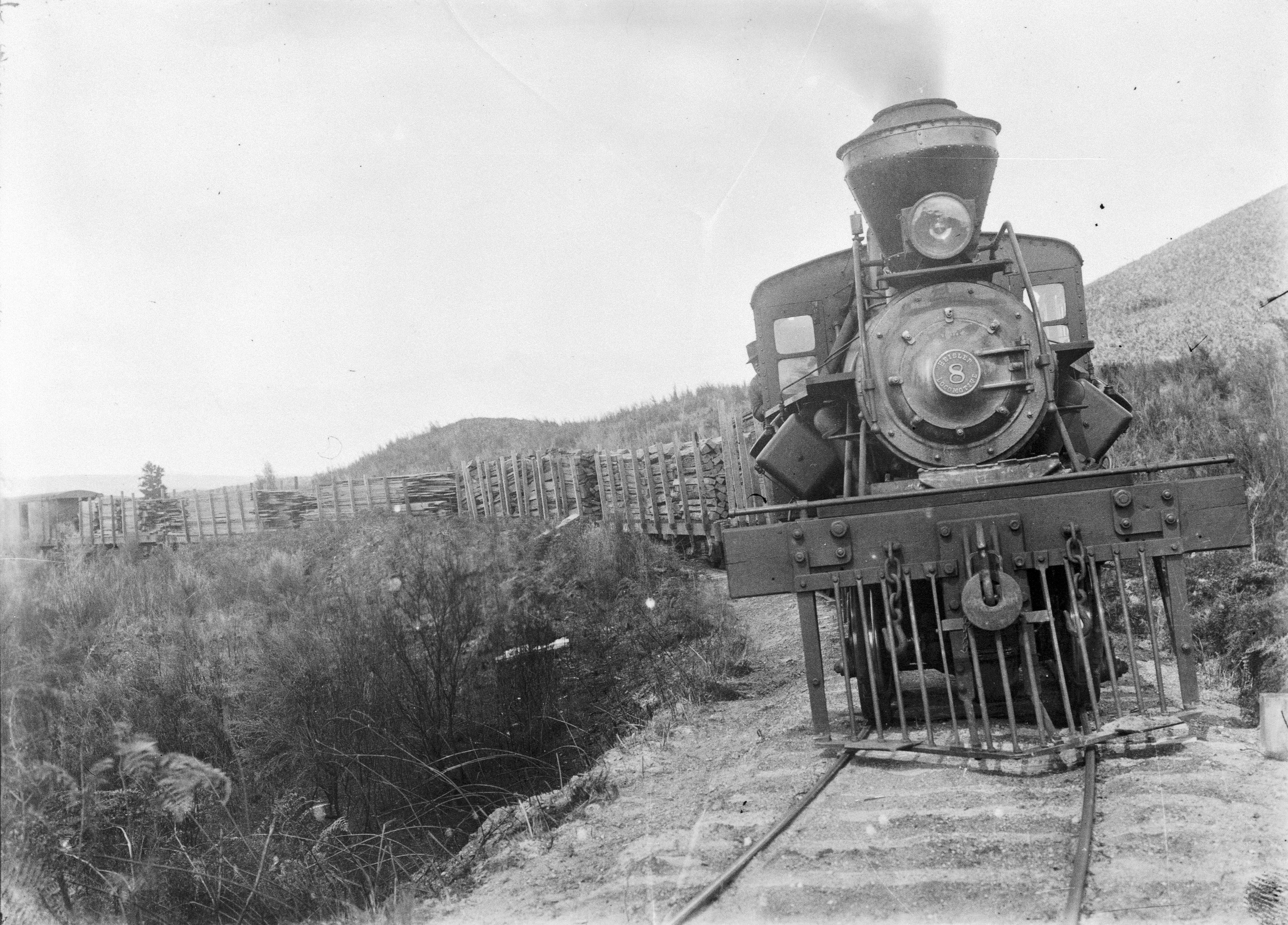
Heisler steam locomotive No 8

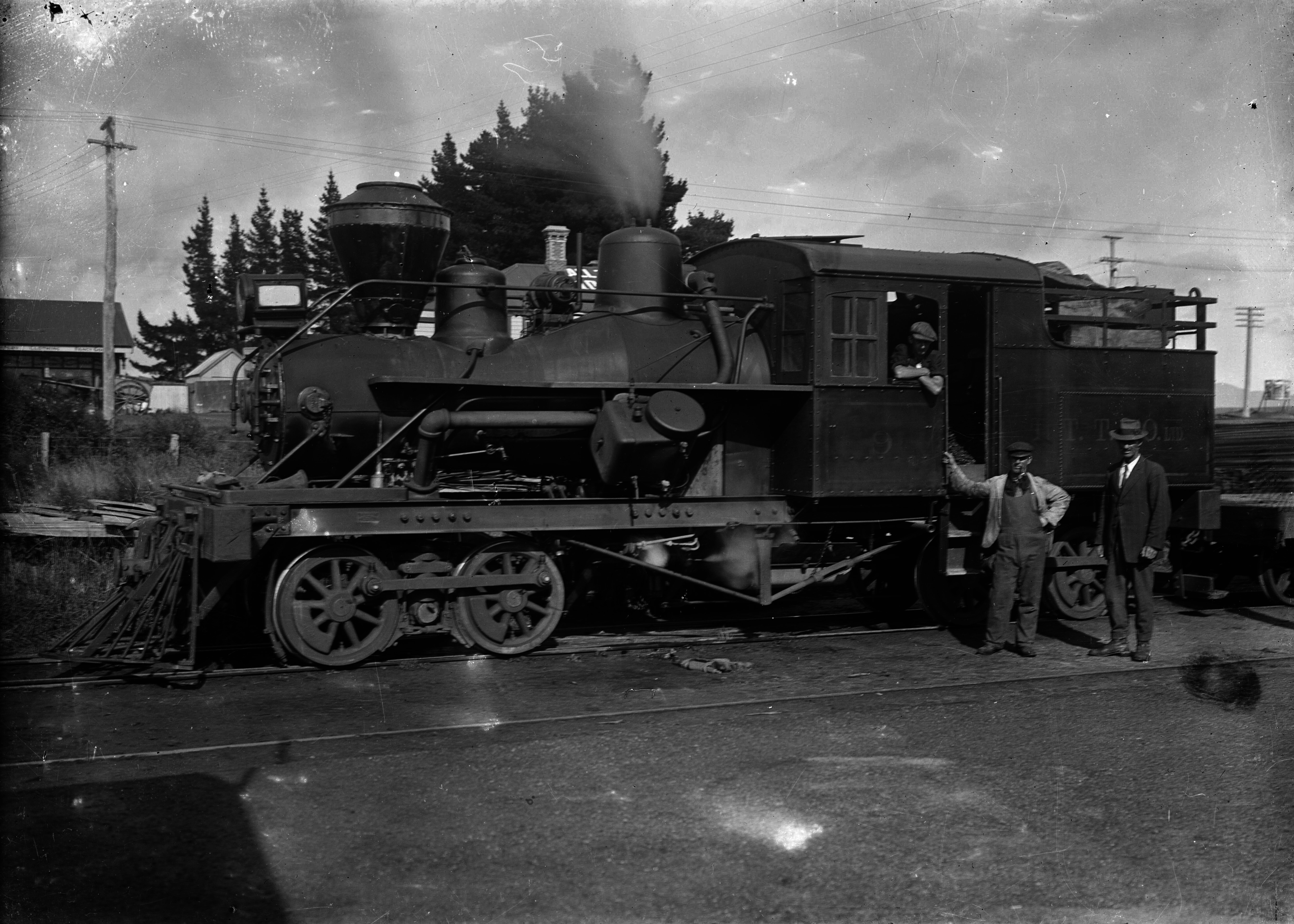
Heisler steam locomotive No 9

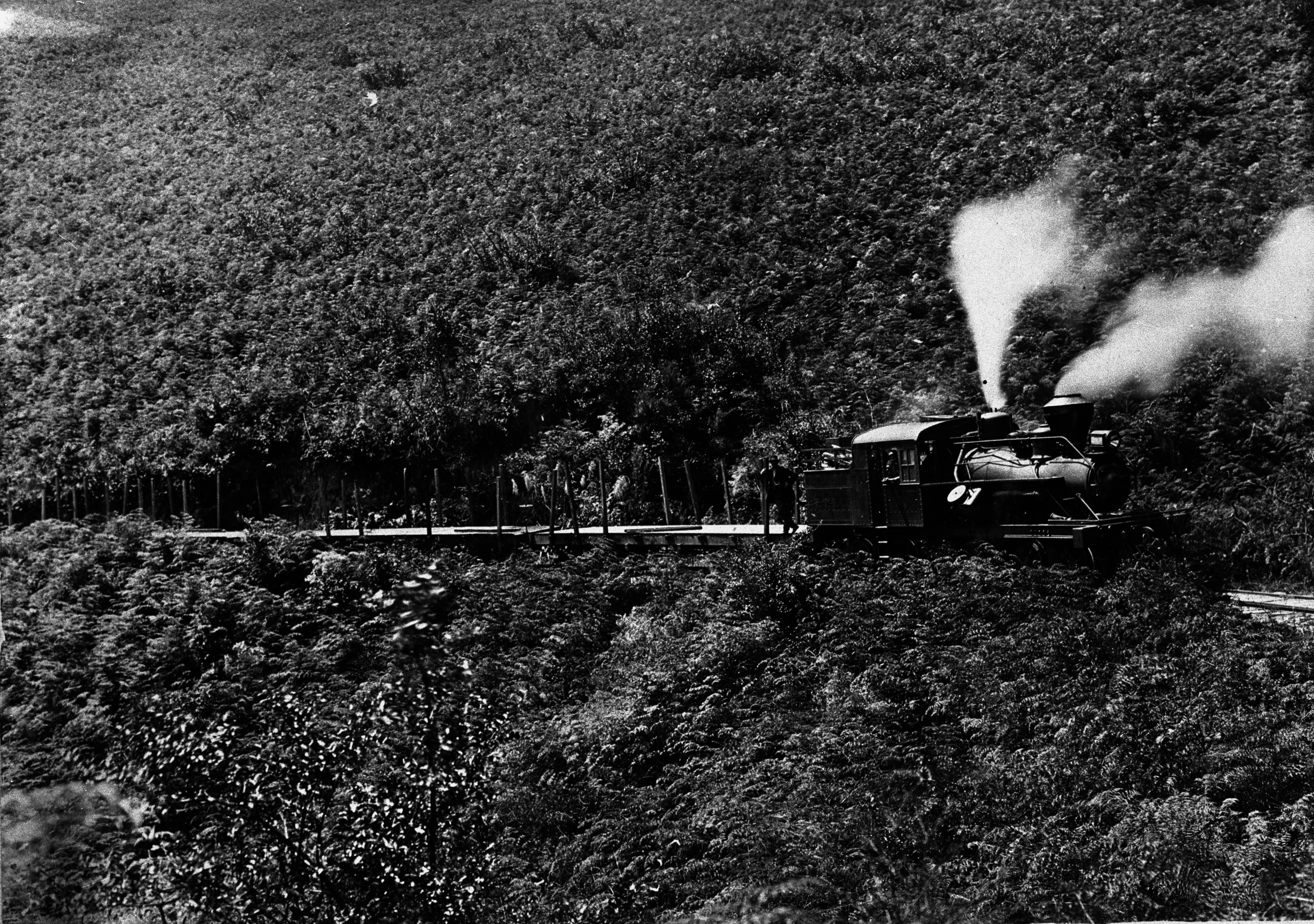
Empty train ton the return trip to Mokai

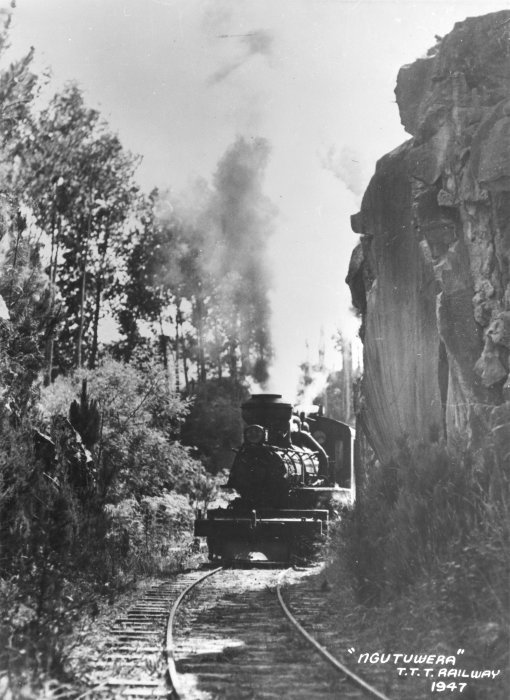
Loco No 7 at Ngutuwera TTT, 1947

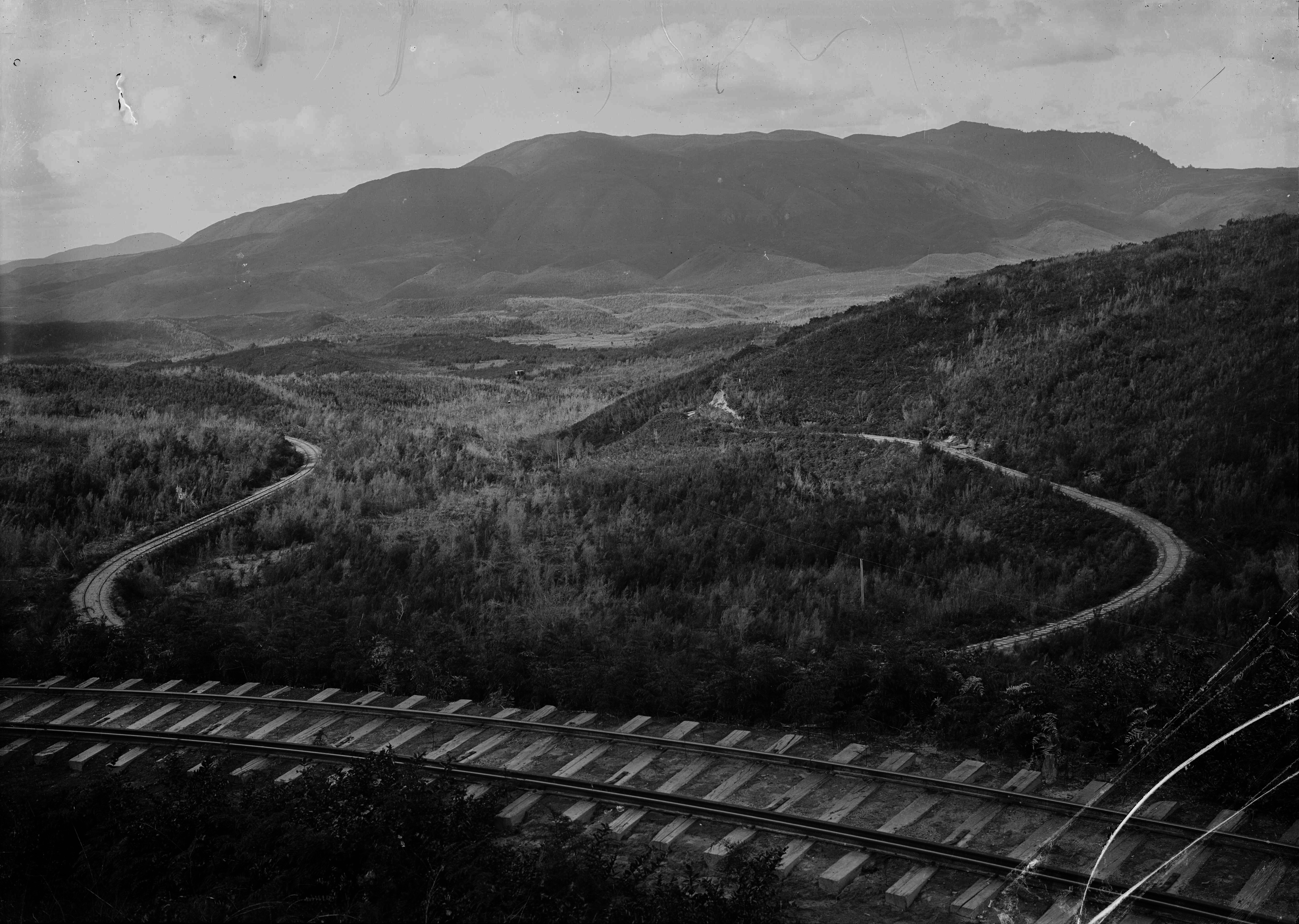
TTT showing "the corkscrew", with five different levels visible at this point (ATLIB 293639)

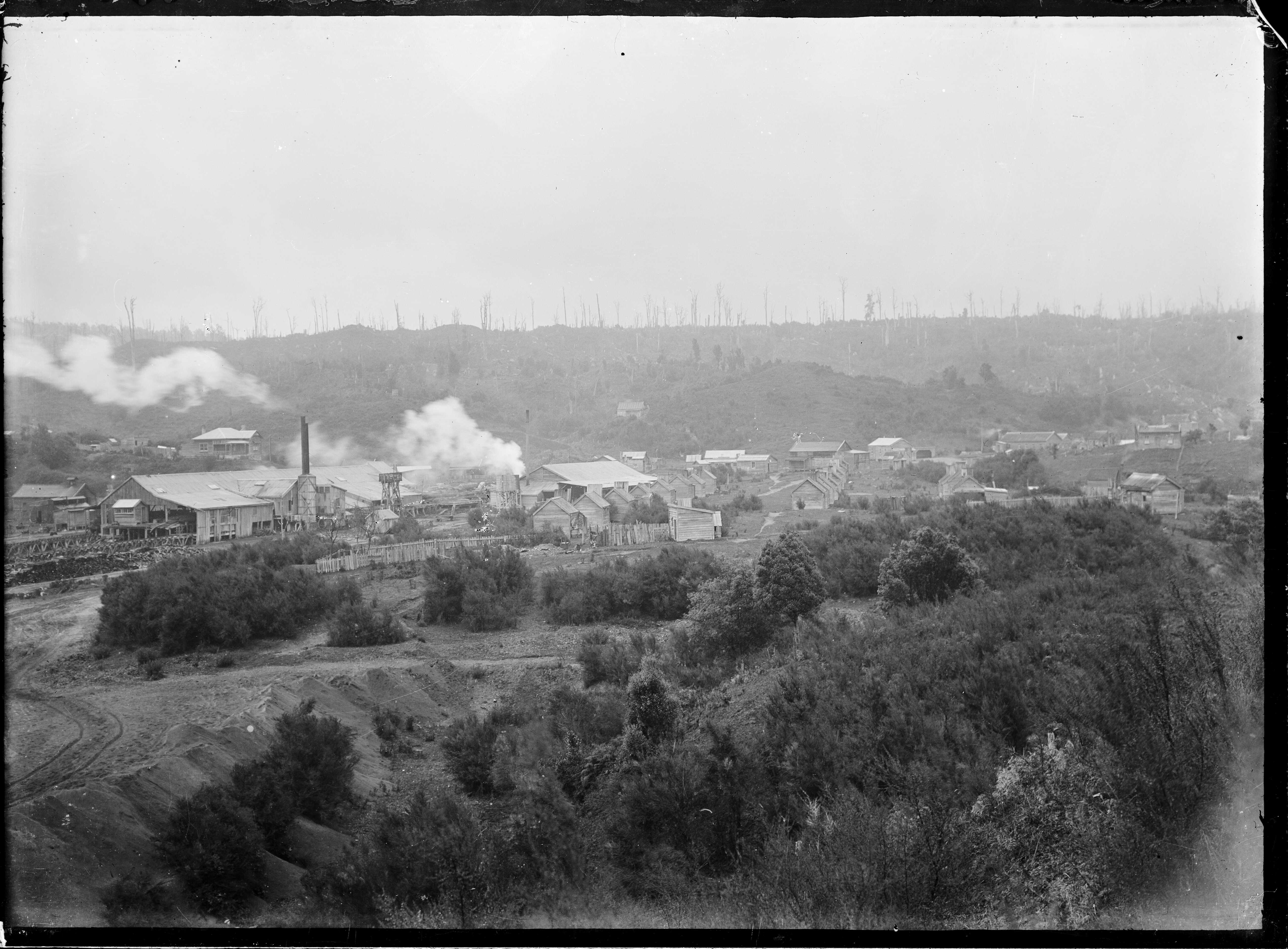
TTT saw-mills at Mokai (ATLIB 293644)

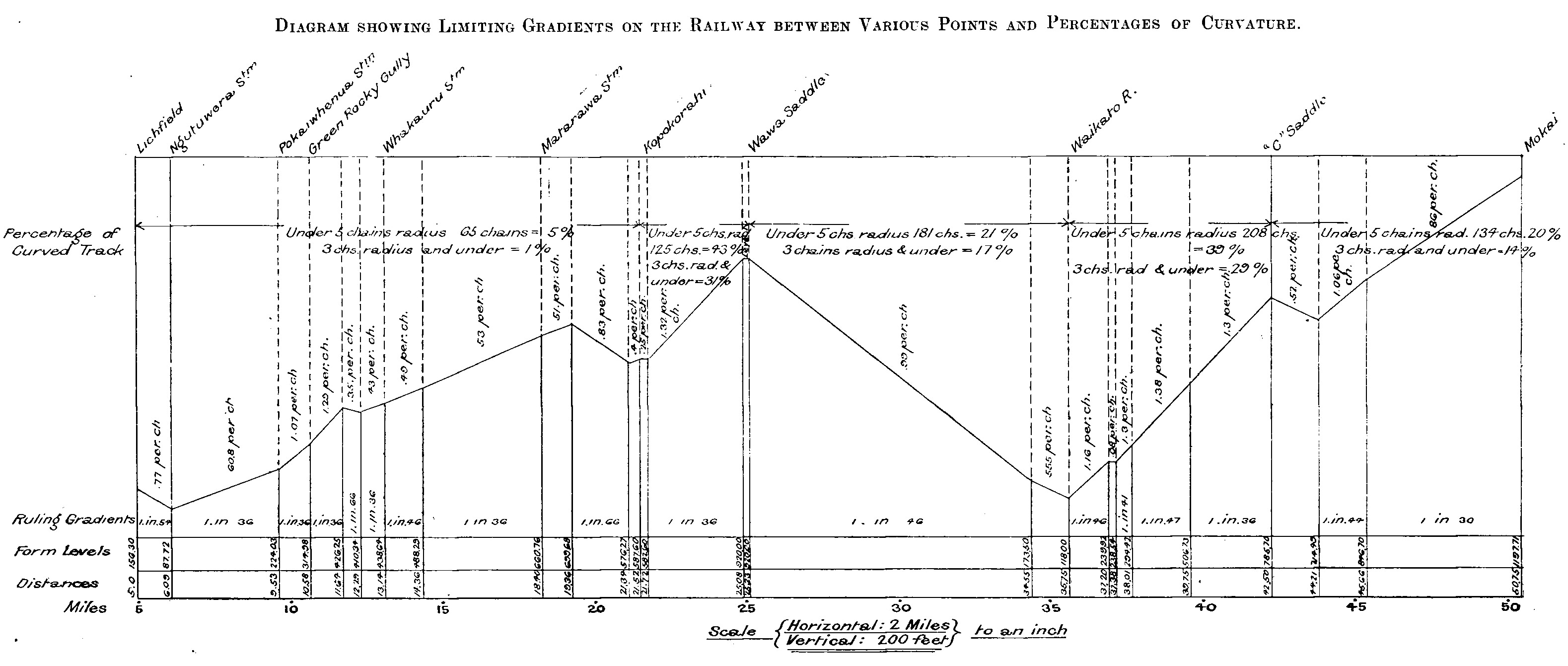
TTT gradients in 1920

== See also ==
- Kinleith Branch
- List of railway lines in New Zealand
- Taupo Totara Timber Company
- Taupo railway proposals

== Bibliography ==
- Churchman, Geoffrey B; Hurst, Tony (2001) [1990, 1991]. The Railways of New Zealand: A Journey through History (Second ed.). Transpress New Zealand. ISBN 0-908876-20-3.
- Clark, Jean Hamilton (1951). Taupo Totara Timber Company and its Share in the Development of the Timber Lands 1900–1950 (MA thesis). Auckland, NZ: Auckland University College.
- Cudby, Kevin (2001). Men of Pluck. Lower Hutt, NZ: Cudby Publications. ISBN 0-473-07505-9.
- Davis, Ida; Forshaw, Ruth (1990). Mokai. Taupō, NZ.
- Jones, Stanley W. (1957). "The Taupo Totara Timber Co". New Zealand Engineering. 12/7: 237–239.
- Mahoney, Paul (2004). The era of the bush tram in New Zealand. Wellington, NZ: Transpress. ISBN 0908876289.
- Scherer, Vicki (1992). Putaruru: Home of the Owl. Tokoroa, NZ: South Waikato District Council.
- TTT (1907). The Taupo Totara Timber Company Limited Minutes 1901 – 1907. Wellington, NZ: The Taupo Totara Timber Company Limited. (NZ Timber Museum Collection https://www.nztm.org.nz) This minute book records combined meetings of the TTT & WID.
- TTT; Sparrow Industrial Pictures Ltd (1951). Fifty Years of Progress – 1901–1951. Putāruru, NZ: Taupo Totara Timber Co Ltd.
