= Pouākani =

Māori iwi (tribe) in Aotearoa (New Zealand)

- Iwi (tribe) in Māoridom

Pouākani is a Māori iwi (tribe) of New Zealand. They have a marae at Mokai, north of Lake Taupō.

== See also ==
- List of Māori iwi
