= Mokai =

Settlement in Waikato, New Zealand

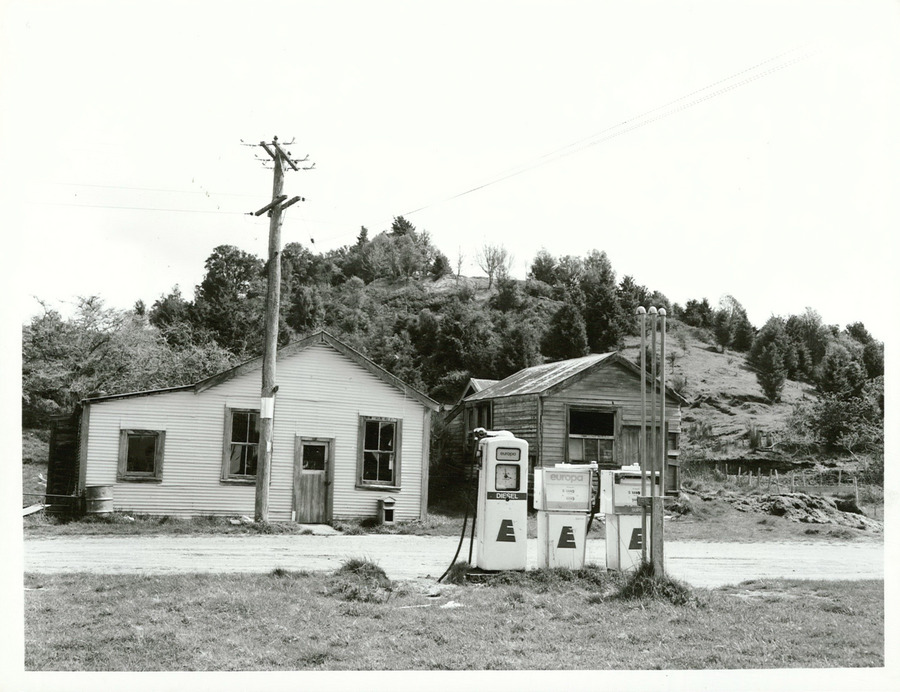
- Mokai in 1979
- Interactive map of Mokai
- Coordinates: 38.526348°S 175.903913°E
- Country: New Zealand
- Region: Waikato region
- District: Taupō District
- Ward: Mangakino-Pouakani General Ward
- Electorates: Taupō; Te Tai Hauāuru (Māori)

Government
  - Territorial Authority: Taupō District Council
  - Regional council: Waikato Regional Council
  - Mayor of Taupō: John Funnell
  - Taupō MP: Louise Upston
  - Hauraki-Waikato MP: Hana-Rawhiti Maipi-Clarke

Area
  - Total: 46.85 km^{2} (18.09 sq mi)

Population (2023 Census)
  - Total: 153
  - Density: 3.27/km^{2} (8.46/sq mi)

Mokai (Māori: Mōkai) is a rural community in the Taupō District and Waikato region of New Zealand's North Island.

The local Mōkai Marae and Pakake Taiari meeting house is a meeting place for: Pouākani, the Ngāti Tūwharetoa hapū of Ngāti Hā, Ngāti Moekino, Ngāti Parekāwa, Ngāti Tarakaiahi, Ngāti Te Kohera, the Ngāti Wairangi and the Ngāti Raukawa hapū of Ngāti Moekino, Ngāti Parekāwa, Ngāti Tarakaiahi, Ngāti Te Kohera, the Ngāti Wairangi hapū of Ngāti Tūwharetoa, Ngāti Whaita and Ngāti Hā.

Mokai Power Station is a geothermal power station owned by the Tuaropaki Power Company and operated by Mercury Energy. It was constructed in 1999 and expanded in 2005 and 2007.

== Demographics ==
Mokai locality covers 46.85 km^{2} (18.09 sq mi). It is part of the larger Marotiri statistical area.

Historical population for Makai locality
Year	Pop.	±% p.a.
2006	180	—
2013	174	−0.48%
2018	174	+0.00%
2023	153	−2.54%

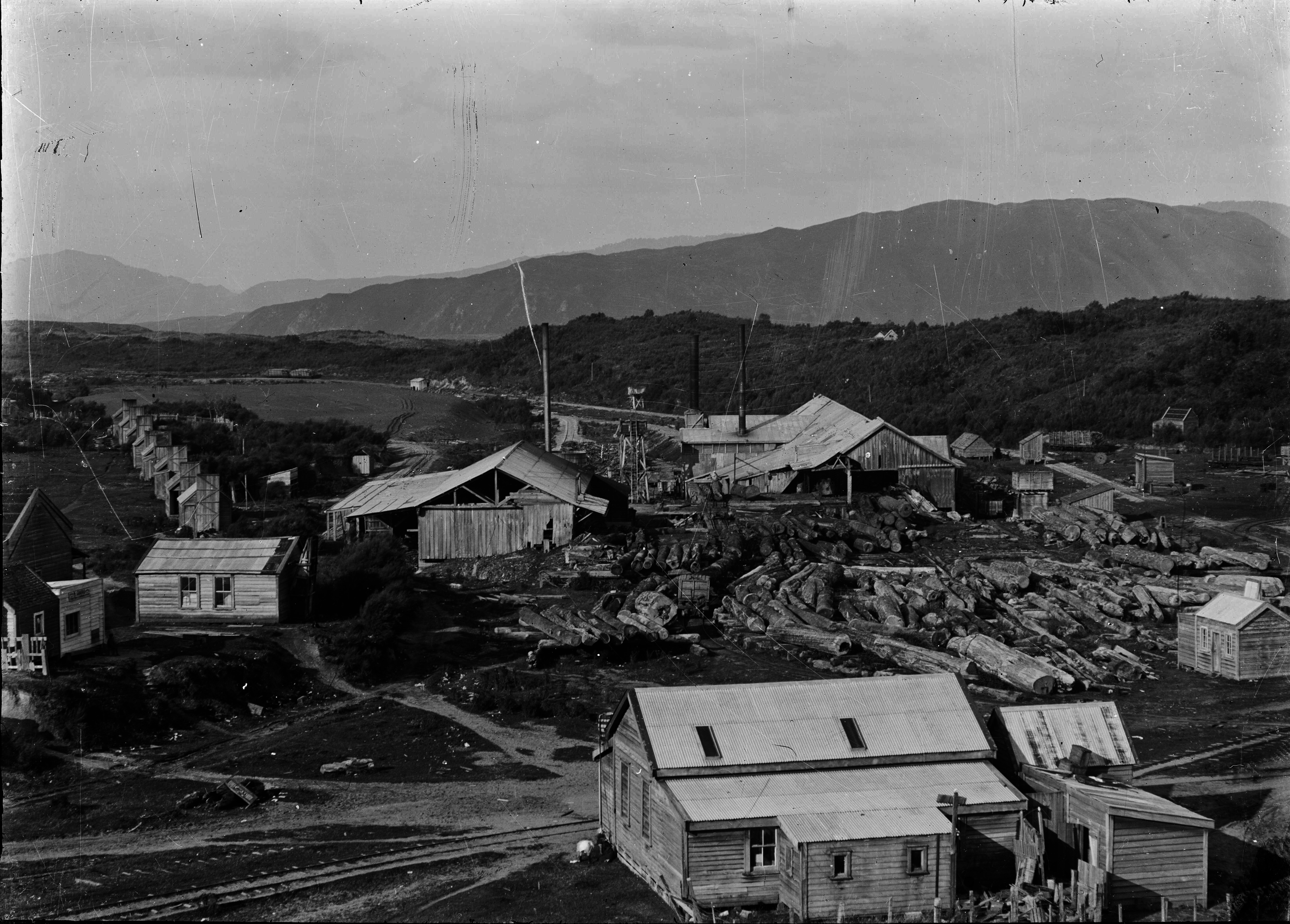
Taupo Totara Timber Company sawmill at Mokai in 1923

Mokai had a population of 153 in the 2023 New Zealand census, a decrease of 21 people (−12.1%) since the 2018 census, and a decrease of 21 people (−12.1%) since the 2013 census. There were 75 males, 78 females, and 3 people of other genders in 51 dwellings. 2.0% of people identified as LGBTIQ+. The median age was 29.1 years (compared with 38.1 years nationally). There were 33 people (21.6%) aged under 15 years, 45 (29.4%) aged 15 to 29, 60 (39.2%) aged 30 to 64, and 15 (9.8%) aged 65 or older.

People could identify as more than one ethnicity. The results were 70.6% European (Pākehā), 49.0% Māori, 3.9% Pasifika, and 3.9% Asian. English was spoken by 98.0%, Māori by 21.6%, and other languages by 2.0%. No language could be spoken by 2.0% (e.g. too young to talk). The percentage of people born overseas was 9.8, compared with 28.8% nationally.

Religious affiliations were 25.5% Christian, 3.9% Māori religious beliefs, and 2.0% other religions. People who answered that they had no religion were 68.6%, and 3.9% of people did not answer the census question.

Of those at least 15 years old, 6 (5.0%) people had a bachelor's or higher degree, 81 (67.5%) had a post-high school certificate or diploma, and 33 (27.5%) people exclusively held high school qualifications. The median income was $51,900, compared with $41,500 nationally. 9 people (7.5%) earned over $100,000 compared to 12.1% nationally. The employment status of those at least 15 was 69 (57.5%) full-time, 12 (10.0%) part-time, and 6 (5.0%) unemployed.

== Education ==
Tirohanga School is a co-educational state primary school, with a roll of 22 as of July 2026. It opened in 1961.

== See also ==
- Taupo Totara Timber Company Railway
